= 2025 AV Alta FC season =

AV Alta
2025 season
- Owner: John Smelzer; J. David Harden; Bob Roback
- President: John Smelzer
- Head coach: Brian Kleiban
- Stadium: Lancaster Municipal Stadium
- USL League One: 9th
- U.S. Open Cup: Round of 32
- USL Cup: Group stage
- USL Playoffs: Did Not Qualify
- Top goalscorer: League: Eduardo Blancas (9 goals); All: Eduardo Blancas (10 goals)
- Highest home attendance: 5,433 vs Westchester SC April 5
- Lowest home attendance: 3,403 vs One Knoxville SC June 7, U.S. Open Cup 2,453 vs Ventura County Fusion March 18
- Average home league attendance: 4,193, 4,191 With USL Cup, 3,986 with U.S. Open Cup and USL Cup
- Biggest win: Westchester SC 2–5 AV Alta FC June 15
- Biggest defeat: South Georgia Tormenta FC 2–0 AV Alta FC March 15, Richmond Kickers 3–1 AV Alta FC March 22, FC Dallas 3–1 AV Alta FC May 7

The 2025 AV Alta FC season was the inaugural season in the club's existence as well as their first in USL League One, the third-tier of American soccer.

== Current roster ==
As of March 12, 2025

Note: Flags indicate national team as defined under FIFA eligibility rules; some limited exceptions apply. Players may hold more than one non-FIFA nationality.

No.	Pos.	Nation	Player
2	DF	USA	Christian Ortiz
3	DF	USA	Elijah Martin
4	DF	ITA	Luca Mastrantonio
5	MF	BEN	Maboumou Alassane
6	MF	PAN	Osvaldo Lay
7	MF	USA	Jerry Desdunes
8	FW	NGR	Emmanuel Alaribe
9	FW	USA	Joaquin Acuna
10	MF	USA	Miguel Ibarra
11	FW	ESA	Alexis Cerritos
14	DF	HAI	Ashkanov Apollon
16	DF	USA	Erick Gonzalez
17	MF	PHI	Javier Mariona
18	MF	USA	Adam Aoumaich

No.	Pos.	Nation	Player
19	MF	USA	Sebastian Cruz
21	MF	USA	Jimmie Villalobos
22	GK	TTO	Denzil Smith
23	GK	MEX	Carlos Avilez
26	DF	COL	Miguel Pajaro
27	GK	USA	Djibril Doumbia
30	MF	USA	Eduardo Blancas
31	MF	USA	Adrian Villafranco
34	MF	USA	Aaron Huerta
35	MF	USA	Harrison Robledo
41	MF	USA	Erik Hernandez Jr
42	DF	USA	Juaquin Garcia Jr.
44	DF	BUL	Kaloyan Pehlivanov
45	DF	USA	Steven Ramos
80	DF	ESA	Walmer Martinez

1. USL Academy Contract

== Transfers ==
=== In ===
Date	Position	Number	Name	from	Type	Fee	Ref.
December 9, 2024	MF	10	(United States) Miguel Ibarra	(United States) Charlotte Independence	Signing	Free	
December 20, 2024	MF	21	(United States) Jimmie Villalobos	(United States) Forward Madison FC	Signing	NA	
December 20, 2024	DF	3	(United States) Elijah Martin	(United States) El Paso Locomotive FC	Signing	NA	
December 30, 2024	MF	11	(El Salvador) Alexis Cerritos	(United States) Lexington SC	Signing	NA	
January 1, 2025	DF	4	(Italy) Luca Mastrantonio	(United States) Union Omaha	Signing	NA	
January 6, 2025	DF	14	(Haiti) Ashkanov Apollon	(United States) Central Valley Fuego FC	Signing	NA	
January 7, 2025	DF	44	(Bulgaria) Kaloyan Pehlivanov	(Bulgaria) FC Hebar Pazardzhik	Signing	NA	
January 9, 2025	DF	26	(Colombia) Miguel Pajaro	(Colombia) Tigres FC	Signing	NA	
January 10, 2025	GK	22	(Trinidad and Tobago) Denzil Smith	(Trinidad and Tobago) AC Port of Spain	Signing	NA	
January 17, 2025	GK	23	(Mexico) Carlos Avilez	(United States) Central Valley Fuego	Signing	NA	
January 22, 2025	FW/MF	30	(United States) Eduardo Blancas	(United States) The Town FC	Signing	NA	
January 25, 2025	MF	35	(United States) Harrison Robledo	(United States) FC Cincinnati 2	Signing	NA	
January 29, 2025	MF	17	(Philippines) Javier Mariona	(United States) Central Valley Fuego	Signing	NA	
January 31, 2025	MF	6	(Panama) Osvaldo Lay	(Panama) Sporting San Miguelito	Signing	NA	
February 4, 2025	MF	7	(Haiti) Jerry Desdunes	(United States) Ventura County Fusion	Signing	NA	
February 7, 2025	DF	80	(El Salvador) Walmer Martinez	(United States) Monterey Bay FC	Signing	NA	
February 8, 2025	FW	8	(Nigeria) Emmanuel Alaribe	(Moldova) Zimbru Chisinau	Signing	NA	
February 12, 2025	FW	9	(United States) Joaquin Acuna	(United States) North Florida Ospreys	Signing	NA	
February 21, 2025	MF	5	(Benin) Maboumou Alassane	(Benin) Coton Sport FC	Signing	NA	
February 26, 2025	MF	19	(United States) Sebastian Cruz	(United States) Sporting Kansas City II	Signing	NA	
March 5, 2025	DF	16	(United States) Erick Gonzalez	(United States) Lexington SC	Signing	NA	
March 12, 2025	DF	2	(United States) Christian Ortiz	(United States) Arizona Monsoon	Signing	NA	
April 19, 2025	MF	18	(United States) Adam Aoumaich	(United States) Union Omaha	Signing	NA	
April 19, 2025	MF	31	(United States) Adrian Villafranco	(United States) AV Alta FC Academy	Academy Callup	NA	
April 19, 2025	MF	34	(United States) Aaron Huerta	(United States) AV Alta FC Academy	Academy Callup	NA	
May 13, 2025	GK	27	(United States) Djibril Doumbia	(United States) San Diego State Aztecs	signing	NA	
May 14, 2025	MF	41	(United States) Erik Hernandez Jr	(United States) AV Alta FC Academy	Academy Callup	NA	
July 10, 2025	DF	45	(United States) Steven Ramos	(United States) AV Alta FC Academy	Academy Callup	NA	

=== Out ===
Date	Position	Number	Name	To	Type	Fee	Ref.
May 15	GK	NA	(United States) Djibril Moussa	(United States) New Mexico United	Loan	NA	

== Non-competitive fixtures ==
=== Friendlies ===
February 15 1	Orange County SC	1–0	AV Alta FC	Irvine, California
				Stadium: Championship Soccer Stadium

=== Mid-season friendlies ===
September 10	AV Alta FC	3–2	(El Salvador) Alianza FC	Lancaster, California
7:00 PM PDT				Stadium: Lancaster Municipal Stadium

== Competitive fixtures ==
=== Regular season ===
March 15 1	South Georgia Tormenta FC	2–0	AV Alta FC	Statesboro, Georgia
	Bazini 7', 16'; Prepeliță (yellow card) 24'; Jiménez (yellow card) 45+1'; Alves (yellow card) 65'; Bwana (yellow card) 77'; Pack (yellow card) 86'	Report	Alassane (yellow card) 54'; Desdunes (yellow card) 71'	Stadium: Tormenta Stadium; Attendance: 539; Referee: Alex Beehler

March 22 2	Richmond Kickers	3–1	AV Alta FC	Richmond, Virginia
5:00 PM EDT	Fitch (yellow card) 41'; O'Dwyer 45+1' (yellow card) 78'; Terzaghi 51', 73'	Report	Cerritos 8' (yellow card) 38'; Pehlivanov (yellow card) 18'; Pajaro (yellow card) 30'; Alassane (red card) 74'; Kleiban (red card) 75'	Stadium: City Stadium; Attendance: 5,542; Referee: DeShun Beard

April 5 3	AV Alta FC	2–0	Westchester SC	Lancaster, California
7:30 PM PDT	Alaribe 9'; Blancas (yellow card) 15'; Villalobos 27'; Lay (yellow card) 43'; Cruz (yellow card) 44'; Pajaro (yellow card) 73'; Acuña (yellow card) 83'	Report	Blommestijn (yellow card) 76'; Obregón (yellow card) 82'	Stadium: Lancaster Municipal Stadium; Attendance: 5,433; Referee: Trevor Wiseman

April 12 4	AV Alta FC	3–2	Chattanooga Red Wolves SC	Lancaster, California
7:30 PM PDT	Avilez (yellow card) 3'; Villalobos 12', 37'; Alassane (yellow card) 15'; Alaribe (yellow card) 39'; Acuña 86' (pen.)	Report	Bentley 4' (pen.), 78'; Knapp (yellow card) 42'; Ayimbila (yellow card) 45+6'; Green (yellow card) 90+9'	Stadium: Lancaster Municipal Stadium; Attendance: 3,982; Referee: Robert Vincze

April 19 5	AV Alta FC	1–2	Spokane Velocity	Lancaster, California
7:30 PM PDT	Lay (yellow card) 18'; Blancas 62'	Report	Denton 37'; Gil 43' (yellow card) 86'; John-Brown (yellow card) 45'; Merancio (yellow card) 60'; Opara (yellow card) 64'	Stadium: Lancaster Municipal Stadium; Attendance: 4,154; Referee: Juma Abdu-Razzaq

May 10 7	AV Alta FC	0–0	Texoma FC	Lancaster, California
7:30 PM PDT	Pajaro (yellow card) 75'; Kleiban (yellow card) 89'; Alaribe (red card) 90+7'	Report	Bortniczuk (yellow card) 32'; Valentine (yellow card) 38'; Mason (yellow card) 68'	Stadium: Lancaster Municipal Stadium; Attendance: 3,607; Referee: Steven Cardozo

May 17 8	Greenville Triumph SC	2–2	AV Alta FC	Greenville, South Carolina
4:00 PM PDT	Polak (yellow card) 45+3'; Castro 71', 76'; Biggar (yellow card) 80'	Report	Cerritos 21'; Pajaro (yellow card) 45+2'; Blancas (yellow card) 48'; Cruz (yellow card) 70'; Alassane (yellow card) 81'; Mariona 86'; Mastrantonio (yellow card) 90+2'	Stadium: Paladin Stadium; Attendance: 1,758; Referee: Cristian Campo

May 24 9	AV Alta FC	2–1	Charlotte Independence	Lancaster, California
7:30 PM PDT	Alassane (yellow card) 6'; Pajaro (yellow card) 19'; Cerritos 45+2'; Blancas 82' (yellow card) 90'; Lay (yellow card) 90+2'	Report	Marou 23'; Jauregui (yellow card) 31'; Chaney (yellow card) 33'	Stadium: Lancaster Municipal Stadium; Attendance: 4,024; Referee: Felix Granados

June 7 10	AV Alta FC	0–0	Spokane Velocity	Lancaster, California
8:00 PM PDT	Cruz (yellow card) 13'; Alassane (yellow card) 90+5'	Report	García (yellow card) 22'; Fernandez (yellow card) 89'	Stadium: Lancaster Municipal Stadium; Attendance: 3,507; Referee: Corbyn May

June 15 11	Westchester SC	2–5	AV Alta FC	Mount Vernon, New York
4:00 PM PDT	McGlynn 24'; Bolanos 25'; Guezen (yellow card) 42'; Pierre (yellow card) 83'; Obregón (yellow card) 86'	Report	Desdunes 38'; Cerritos (yellow card) 45+2'; Lay 52'; Alaribe 70'; Blancas 84' (pen.); Cruz 90+6'; Aoumaich (yellow card) 90+7'	Stadium: The Stadium at Memorial Field; Attendance: 2,492; Referee: Muhammad Kaleia

June 21 12	AV Alta FC	1–1	Portland Hearts of Pine	Lancaster, California
8:00 PM PDT	Pehlivanov (yellow card) 27'; Villalobos (yellow card) 32'; Alaribe 39' (yellow card) 88'; Pajaro (yellow card) 58'	Report	Vinberg (yellow card) 21'; Wright (yellow card) 45+3'; Wada (yellow card) 75'; Liadi 77' (yellow card) 89'	Stadium: Lancaster Municipal Stadium; Attendance: 4,020; Referee: Matthew Thompson

June 28 6	AV Alta FC	4–1	FC Naples	Lancaster, California
8:00 PM PDT	Desdunes 26'; Blancas 59', 73', 86'; Alassane (yellow card) 61'; Pajaro (yellow card) 69'; Aoumaich (yellow card) 78'	Report	Torrellas 47'	Stadium: Lancaster Municipal Stadium; Attendance: 4,420; Referee: Jay Schlesinger

July 2 13	Portland Hearts of Pine	0–2	AV Alta FC	Portland, Maine
6:30 PM EDT	Washington (yellow card) 15'; Wada (yellow card) 35'		Desdunes 39'; Blancas (yellow card) 59'; Alassane (yellow card) 68'; Martinez 77'; Avilez (yellow card) 78'	Stadium: Fitzpatrick Stadium; Attendance: 5,735; Referee: Luis Arroyo

July 5 14	AV Alta FC	2–1	Union Omaha	Lancaster, California
8:00 PM PDT	Alassane (yellow card) 16'; Martinez 45+2'; Mastrantonio 50'	Report	Gallardo (yellow card) 14'; Becher (yellow card) 19' (goal) 27'; Schneider (yellow card) 76'	Stadium: Lancaster Municipal Stadium; Attendance: 4,062; Referee: Joe Surgan

July 16 15	One Knoxville SC	3–1	AV Alta FC	Knoxville, Tennessee
7:00 PM EDT	Brown 22'; Skelton (yellow card) 62'; Johnson 81'; Rosamilia 90+2'	Report	Blancas (yellow card) 35'; Pajaro (yellow card) 42'; Martinez 68' (yellow card) 90+5'	Stadium: Covenant Health Park; Attendance: 2,205; Referee: Stephen Foster

July 19 16	AV Alta FC	1–1	FC Naples	Lancaster, California
8:00 PM PDT	Alassane (yellow card) 20'; Robledo (yellow card) 28'; Villalobos 32'; Pehlivanov (yellow card) 35'; Avilez (yellow card) 73'	Report	Dengler (yellow card) 24'; Henderlong (yellow card) 50'; Evans (yellow card) 61'; Glasser (yellow card) 86'; Cisneros 90+1'	Stadium: Lancaster Municipal Stadium; Attendance: 4,557; Referee: Dion Coxe-Trieger

August 2 17	Forward Madison FC	0–0	AV Alta FC	Madison, Wisconsin
3:00 PM PDT	Brown (yellow card) 63'; Glaeser (yellow card) 81'	Report	Aoumaich (yellow card) 36'; Pehlivanov (yellow card) 44'; Ortiz (yellow card) 47'; Mariona (yellow card) 61'; Blancas (yellow card) 79'	Stadium: Breese Stevens Field; Attendance: 4,650; Referee: Carlos Rodriguez

August 9 18	Spokane Velocity	2–0	AV Alta FC	Spokane, Washington
7:00 PM PDT	Vinyals 14'; Garcia 51'; Opara (yellow card) 90+1'	Report	Blancas (yellow card) 45+1'; Alaribe (yellow card) 70'; Pehlivanov (yellow card) 86'	Stadium: ONE Spokane Stadium; Attendance: 2,848; Referee: Drew Klemp

August 16 19	AV Alta FC	1–1	Greenville Triumph SC	Lancaster, California
8:00 PM PDT	Desdunes 24' (yellow card) 32'; Martinez (yellow card) 65'; Cruz (yellow card) 69'	Report	Evans (yellow card) 65'; Mensah 84'	Stadium: Lancaster Municipal Stadium; Attendance: 4,474; Referee: Jaclyn Metz

August 20 20	Texoma FC	3–3	AV Alta FC	Sherman, Texas
5:00 PM PDT	Jawneh 24'; Spengler 27'; Calfo (yellow card) 38' (yellow-red card) 54'; McCormick 46'; Chavez (yellow card) 61'; Garcia (yellow card) 90+5'	Report	Ávilez (yellow card) 34'; Alaribe (yellow card) 54'; Blancas 58'; Martinez 60'; Ramos (yellow card) 63' (goal) 89'	Stadium: Sherman Bearcat Stadium; Attendance: 765; Referee: Gloria Martinez

August 23 21	Union Omaha	2–0	AV Alta FC	Papillion, Nebraska
5:00 PM PDT	Kasim 27'; Pehlivanov 78' (o.g.)	Report	Pajaro (yellow card) 52'; Blancas (yellow card) 84'	Stadium: Werner Park; Attendance: 3,704; Referee: Rodrigo Albuquerque

August 30 22	Chattanooga Red Wolves SC	0–0	AV Alta FC	East Ridge, Tennessee
3:00 PM PDT	Hernandez (yellow card) 22'; Gómez (yellow card) 51'; Jerez (yellow card) 90+8'	Report	Desdunes (yellow card) 45+2'; Cruz (yellow card) 57'; Alassane (yellow card) 75'; Ramos (yellow card) 90+1'; Alaribe (yellow card) 90+6'	Stadium: CHI Memorial Stadium; Attendance: 2,000; Referee: Mario Maric

September 6 23	AV Alta FC	3–3	Forward Madison FC	Lancaster, California
7:30 PM PDT	Blancas 2', 60' (pen.); Pajaro 39'; Martinez (yellow card) 63'	Report	Garcia (yellow card) 1'; Gebhard 32' (pen.); Angking 45', 55'; Murphy (yellow card) 66'; Boyce (yellow card) 88'	Stadium: Lancaster Municipal Stadium; Attendance: 3,740; Referee: Trevor Wiseman

September 13 24	AV Alta FC	1–2	One Knoxville SC	Lancaster, California
7:30 PM PDT	Mariona 13'; Ramos (yellow card) 52'; Gonzalez (yellow card) 86'	Report	Gøling 16'; Fernández (yellow card) 62'; Kelly (yellow card) 65'; Johnson (yellow card) 89'; Haugli (yellow card) 89'; Doyle (yellow card) 89'; Tekiela 90+2'	Stadium: Lancaster Municipal Stadium; Attendance: 3,403; Referee: Cristian Campo

September 20 25	AV Alta FC	0–3	South Georgia Tormenta FC	Lancaster, California
7:30 PM PDT	Alassane (yellow card) 18'; Cerritos (yellow card) 80'; Lay (yellow card) 83'	Report	Malou (yellow card) 33'; Stretch (yellow card) 44'; Alves (yellow card) 52'; Bazini 54', 74'; Bwana 83' (pen.); Pack (yellow card) 90+8'	Stadium: Lancaster Municipal Stadium; Attendance: 4,254; Referee: Ivan de Cristofaro

September 27 26	FC Naples	4–0	AV Alta FC	Naples, Florida
4:00 PM PDT	Onen 28' (yellow card) 45+5'; O'Connor 45+2'; Cisneros 58'; Fernandes (yellow card) 76'; Cerro 76'	Report	Pehlivanov (yellow card) 10'	Stadium: Paradise Coast Sports Complex; Attendance: 3,091; Referee: Aleksandar Zhelyazkov

October 4 27	Texoma FC	1–1	AV Alta FC	Sherman, Texas
5:00 PM PDT	McManus (yellow card) 34'; Spengler (yellow card) 41' (goal) 74' (pen.); Jordan (yellow card) 68'; Perkins (yellow card) 88'; Ramos (yellow card) 89'; Baker (yellow card) 90+6'	Report	Cruz (yellow card) 34'; Cerritos 90+2'	Stadium: Sherman Bearcat Stadium; Attendance: 1,182; Referee: Jay Schlesinger

October 10 28	Charlotte Independence	3–2	AV Alta FC	Charlotte, North Carolina
4:00 PM EDT	Bakero 25'; Chaney 35'; Ndiaye (yellow card) 40'; Marou 90+3'	Report	Lay (yellow card) 10'; Alassane (yellow card) 29'; Cerritos 42'; Ortiz 58'	Stadium: American Legion Memorial Stadium; Attendance: 584; Referee: John Matto

October 17 29	AV Alta FC	2–0	Richmond Kickers	Lancaster, California
7:30 PM PDT	Ortiz (yellow card) 35'; Cerritos 40'; Villalobos 61'; Lay (yellow card) 70'; Ibarra (yellow card) 72'	Report	Fitch (yellow card) 19'; Lage (yellow card) 74'; Vaughan (yellow card) 89'	Stadium: Lancaster Municipal Stadium; Attendance: 5,251; Referee: Matthew Thompson

October 25 30	Portland Hearts of Pine	2–2	AV Alta FC	Portland, Maine
2:00 PM PDT	James (yellow card) 20'; Poon-Angeron (yellow card) 32'; Wada 35' (yellow card) 68' (yellow-red card) 72'; Messer 63'	Report	Blancas 8', 70'; Pehlivanov (yellow card) 23'; Aoumaich (yellow card) 45'	Stadium: Fitzpatrick Stadium; Attendance: 6,089; Referee: Alexandra Billeter

=== Lamar Hunt US Open Cup ===
March 18 First Round	AV Alta FC	3–1	Ventura County Fusion	Lancaster, California
10:30 PM EDT	Desdunes 28', 45+3'; Cruz 52'		Fofanah 42'	Stadium: Lancaster Municipal Stadium; Attendance: 2,453; Referee: Felix Granados

April 1 Second Round	AV Alta FC	2–1 (a.e.t.)	Los Angeles FC 2	Lancaster, California
10:30 PM ET	Alaribe (yellow card) 70' (goal) 80'; Alassane (yellow card) 81'; Villalobos (yellow card) 108' (yellow-red card) 120' (goal) 120'		Guerra (yellow card) 29' (goal) 64'; Díaz (yellow card) 105'	Stadium: Lancaster Municipal Stadium; Attendance: 2,735; Referee: Servando Berna Rico

April 15 Third Round	AV Alta FC	2–2 (a.e.t.) (4–2 p)	Orange County SC	Lancaster, California
10:00 PM ET	Mastrantonio (yellow card) 40' (goal) 67'; Alaribe 75'; Pajaro (yellow card) 82'; Robledo (yellow card) 120'		Sylla 15'; Scott (yellow card) 81'; War 83'; Dunbar (yellow card) 90+5'	Stadium: Lancaster Municipal Stadium; Attendance: 3,287; Referee: Brandon Stevis
	Penalties
	Cerritos (penalty scored); Blancos (penalty scored); Cruz (penalty scored); Pajaro (penalty scored)		(penalty scored) Dunbar; (penalty scored) MacKinnon; (penalty missed) Scott; (penalty missed) Benalcazar

May 7 Fourth Round	FC Dallas	3–1	AV Alta FC	Frisco, Texas
7:00 pm CT	Acosta 3' (yellow card) 62'; Ntsabeleng (yellow card) 7'; Kaick 43'; Kamungo 71'; Ramiro (yellow card) 90+4'		Lay 16'; Alassane (yellow card) 39'; Blancas (yellow card) 45'; Alaribe (yellow card) 53'; Villalobos (yellow card) 76'; Aoumaich (yellow card) 90+4'	Stadium: Toyota Stadium; Attendance: 4,892

=== USL Cup ===
April 26 Group Stage	Sacramento Republic FC	1–0	AV Alta FC	Sacramento, California
7:00 PM PDT	Herrera 45+1'; Parano (yellow card) 59'; Benítez (yellow card) 75'	Report	Lay (yellow card) 59'; Aoumaich (yellow card) 79'	Stadium: Heart Health Park; Attendance: 8,898; Referee: Servando Berna Rico

April 30 Group Stage	Las Vegas Lights FC	2–1	AV Alta FC	Las Vegas, Nevada
7:30 PM PDT	Pearson 4'; Singer (yellow card) 55'; Azcona (yellow card) 63'; Pickering 73'; Rodriguez (yellow card) 77'	Report	Cruz (yellow card) 13'; Blancas 47' (yellow card) 85'; Aoumaich (yellow card) 53'	Stadium: Cashman Field; Attendance: 1,795; Referee: Ekaterina Koroleva

May 31 Group Stage	AV Alta FC	2–2 (4–2 p)	Oakland Roots SC	Lancaster, California
7:30 PM PDT	Lay (yellow card) 39'; Cruz 57'; Alassane 90+5'	Report	Byaruhanga (yellow card) 31'; Doner 62'; Wilson 63'; Margvelashvili (yellow card) 70'	Stadium: Lancaster Municipal Stadium; Attendance: 3,951; Referee: Mark Verso
	Penalties
	Blancas (penalty scored); Cerritos (penalty scored); Cruz (penalty scored); Pehlivanov (penalty scored)		(penalty missed) Njie; (penalty scored) Greene; (penalty scored) Hackshaw; (penalty missed) Wilson

July 26 Group Stage	AV Alta FC	2–1	Monterey Bay FC	Lancaster, California
8:00 PM PDT	Lay 9'; Alaribe (yellow card) 21'; Pehlivanov (yellow card) 25'; Aoumaich 73'; Villalobos (yellow card) 90+6'	Report	Gnaulati 8'; Robinson (yellow card) 50'; Rebollar (yellow card) 60'; Muir (yellow card) 66'; Fonguck (yellow card) 90+2'	Stadium: Lancaster Municipal Stadium; Attendance: 4,408; Referee: Muhammad Kaleia

=== Appearances and goals ===
No.	Pos	Nat	Player	Total		USL League One		Lamar Hunt US Open Cup		USL Cup		USL League One Playoffs	
No.	Pos	Nat	Player	Apps	Goals	Apps	Goals	Apps	Goals	Apps	Goals	Apps	Goals
2	DF	(United States) USA	Christian Ortiz	23	1	15+5	1	1+0	0	1+1	0	0+0	0
3	DF	(United States) USA	Elijah Martin	2	0	0+1	0	0+0	0	0+1	0	0+0	0
4	DF	(Italy) ITA	Luca Mastrantonio	20	2	9+5	1	4+0	1	2+0	0	0+0	0
5	MF	(Benin) BEN	Maboumou Alassane	31	1	20+4	0	4+0	0	1+2	1	0+0	0
6	MF	(Panama) PAN	Osvaldo Lay	35	3	18+10	1	2+2	1	3+0	1	0+0	0
7	MF	(Haiti) HAI	Jerry Desdunes	33	6	21+5	4	3+1	2	2+1	0	0+0	0
8	FW	(Nigeria) NGR	Emmanuel Alaribe	31	5	12+12	3	3+1	2	3+0	0	0+0	0
9	FW	(United States) USA	Joaquin Acuna	6	1	0+4	1	1+1	0	0+0	0	0+0	0
10	MF	(United States) USA	Miguel Ibarra	10	0	0+6	0	0+1	0	2+1	0	0+0	0
11	FW	(El Salvador) ESA	Alexis Cerritos	26	6	13+6	6	1+3	0	1+2	0	0+0	0
14	DF	(Haiti) HAI	Ashkanov Apollon	8	0	0+6	0	0+1	0	1+0	0	0+0	0
16	DF	(United States) USA	Erick Gonzalez	18	0	5+8	0	1+2	0	2+0	0	0+0	0
17	MF	(Philippines) PHI	Javier Mariona	24	2	11+9	2	0+1	0	1+2	0	0+0	0
18	MF	(United States) USA	Adam Aoumaich	22	1	7+10	0	0+1	0	1+3	1	0+0	0
19	MF	(United States) USA	Sebastian Cruz	35	3	28+0	1	4+0	1	3+0	1	0+0	0
21	MF	(United States) USA	Jimmie Villalobos	34	6	20+9	5	0+3	1	1+1	0	0+0	0
22	GK	(Trinidad and Tobago) TTO	Denzil Smith	15	0	12+0	0	1+1	0	1+0	0	0+0	0
23	GK	(Mexico) MEX	Carlos Avilez	25	0	18+1	0	3+0	0	3+0	0	0+0	0
26	DF	(Colombia) COL	Miguel Pajaro	33	1	28+0	1	4+0	0	1+0	0	0+0	0
27	GK	(United States) USA	Djibril Doumbia	0	0	0+0	0	0+0	0	0+0	0	0+0	0
30	MF	(United States) USA	Eduardo Blancas	36	12	23+6	11	4+0	0	3+0	1	0+0	0
31	MF	(United States) USA	Adrian Villafranco	1	0	0+0	0	0+0	0	0+1	0	0+0	0
34	MF	(United States) USA	Aaron Huerta	3	0	0+2	0	0+0	0	1+0	0	0+0	0
35	MF	(United States) USA	Harrison Robledo	30	0	15+7	0	2+2	0	2+2	0	0+0	0
41	MF	(United States) USA	Erik Hernandez	0	0	0+0	0	0+0	0	0+0	0	0+0	0
42	DF	(United States) USA	Juaquin Garcia Jr.	0	0	0+0	0	0+0	0	0+0	0	0+0	0
44	DF	(Bulgaria) BUL	Kaloyan Pehlivanov	33	0	23+3	0	3+0	0	4+0	0	0+0	0
45	DF	(United States) USA	Steven Ramos	21	1	15+4	1	0+0	0	2+0	0	0+0	0
80	DF	(El Salvador) ESA	Walmer Martinez	29	3	17+8	3	2+0	0	2+0	0	0+0	0

=== Top goalscorers ===
Rank	Position	Number	Name	USL1 Season	U.S. Open Cup	USL Cup	USL League One Playoffs	Total
1	MF	30	(United States) Eduardo Blancas	11	0	1	0	12
2	FW	11	(El Salvador) Alexis Cerritos	6	0	0	0	6
2	MF	21	(United States) Jimmie Villalobos	5	1	0	0	6
2	MF	7	(Haiti) Jerry Desdunes	4	2	0	0	6
5	FW	8	(Nigeria) Emmanuel Alaribe	3	2	0	0	5
6	DF	80	(El Salvador) Walmer Martinez	4	0	0	0	4
7	MF	6	(Panama) Osvaldo Lay	1	1	1	0	3
7	MF	19	(United States) Sebastian Cruz	1	1	1	0	3
9	MF	17	(Philippines) Javier Mariona	2	0	0	0	2
9	DF	4	(Italy) Luca Mastrantonio	1	1	0	0	2
11	DF	2	(United States) Christian Ortiz	1	0	0	0	1
11	FW	9	(United States) Joaquín Acuña	1	0	0	0	1
11	DF	26	(Colombia) Miguel Pajaro	1	0	0	0	1
11	DF	45	(United States) Steven Ramos	1	0	0	0	1
11	MF	18	(Benin) Maboumou Alassane	0	0	1	0	1
11	MF	5	(United States) Adam Aoumaich	0	0	1	0	1
Total				42	8	5	0	55

=== Assist scorers ===
Rank	Position	Number	Name	USL1 Season	U.S. Open Cup	USL Cup	USL League One Playoffs	Total
1	MF	30	(United States) Eduardo Blancas	5	1	1	0	7
2	MF	19	(United States) Sebastian Cruz	6	0	0	0	6
2	MF	7	(Haiti) Jerry Desdunes	5	1	0	0	6
4	DF	80	(El Salvador) Walmer Martinez	3	0	0	0	3
4	MF	35	(United States) Harrison Robledo	2	1	0	0	3
4	MF	18	(United States) Adam Aoumaich	2	0	1	0	3
7	MF	17	(Philippines) Javier Mariona	2	0	0	0	2
7	MF	21	(United States) Jimmie Villalobos	2	0	0	0	2
7	MF	6	(Panama) Osvaldo Lay	1	1	0	0	2
10	DF	44	(Bulgaria) Kaloyan Pehlivanov	1	0	0	0	1
10	FW	9	(United States) Joaquin Acuna	0	1	0	0	1
10	DF	2	(United States) Christian Ortiz	0	0	1	0	1
Total				29	5	3	0	37

=== Clean sheets ===
Rank	Name	USL1 Season	U.S. Open Cup	USL Cup	Total
1	(Mexico) Carlos Avilez	2	0	0	2
2	(Trinidad and Tobago) Denzil Smith	1	0	0	1
Total		3	0	0	3

=== Disciplinary record ===
No.	Pos.	Player	USL League One Regular Season			Lamar Hunt US Open Cup			USL Cup			USL League One Playoffs			Total		
No.	Pos.	Player	Yellow card	(yellow card) (yellow-red card)	Red card	Yellow card	(yellow card) (yellow-red card)	Red card	Yellow card	(yellow card) (yellow-red card)	Red card	Yellow card	(yellow card) (yellow-red card)	Red card	Yellow card	(yellow card) (yellow-red card)	Red card
2	DF	(United States) Christian Ortiz	2	0	0	0	0	0	0	0	0	0	0	0	2	0	0
3	DF	(United States) Elijah Martin	0	0	0	0	0	0	0	0	0	0	0	0	0	0	0
4	DF	(Italy) Luca Mastrantonio	1	0	0	1	0	0	0	0	0	0	0	0	2	0	0
5	MF	(Benin) Maboumou Alassane	12	0	1	2	0	0	0	0	0	0	0	0	14	0	1
6	MF	(Panama) Osvaldo Lay	5	0	0	0	0	0	2	0	0	0	0	0	7	0	0
7	MF	(Haiti) Jerry Desdunes	3	0	0	0	0	0	0	0	0	0	0	0	3	0	0
8	FW	(Nigeria) Emmanuel Alaribe	5	0	1	2	0	0	1	0	0	0	0	0	8	0	1
9	FW	(United States) Joaquin Acuna	1	0	0	0	0	0	0	0	0	0	0	0	1	0	0
10	MF	(United States) Miguel Ibarra	1	0	0	0	0	0	0	0	0	0	0	0	1	0	0
11	FW	(El Salvador) Alexis Cerritos	3	0	0	0	0	0	0	0	0	0	0	0	3	0	0
14	DF	(Haiti) Ashkanov Apollon	0	0	0	0	0	0	0	0	0	0	0	0	0	0	0
16	DF	(United States) Erick Gonzalez	1	0	0	0	0	0	0	0	0	0	0	0	1	0	0
17	MF	(Philippines) Javier Mariona	1	0	0	0	0	0	0	0	0	0	0	0	1	0	0
18	MF	(United States) Adam Aoumaich	4	0	0	1	0	0	2	0	0	0	0	0	7	0	0
19	MF	(United States) Sebastian Cruz	6	0	0	0	0	0	1	0	0	0	0	0	7	0	0
21	MF	(United States) Jimmie Villalobos	1	0	0	3	1	0	1	0	0	0	0	0	5	1	0
22	GK	(Trinidad and Tobago) Denzil Smith	0	0	0	0	0	0	0	0	0	0	0	0	0	0	0
23	GK	(Mexico) Carlos Avilez	4	0	0	0	0	0	0	0	0	0	0	0	4	0	0
26	DF	(Colombia) Miguel Pajaro	9	0	0	1	0	0	0	0	0	0	0	0	10	0	0
27	GK	(United States) Djibril Doumbia	0	0	0	0	0	0	0	0	0	0	0	0	0	0	0
30	MF	(United States) Eduardo Blancos	8	0	0	1	0	0	1	0	0	0	0	0	10	0	0
31	MF	(United States) Adrian Villafranco	0	0	0	0	0	0	0	0	0	0	0	0	0	0	0
34	MF	(United States) Aaron Huerta	0	0	0	0	0	0	0	0	0	0	0	0	0	0	0
35	MF	(United States) Harrison Robledo	1	0	0	1	0	0	0	0	0	0	0	0	2	0	0
41	MF	(United States) Erk Hernandez	0	0	0	0	0	0	0	0	0	0	0	0	0	0	0
42	DF	(United States) Juaquin Garcia Jr.	0	0	0	0	0	0	0	0	0	0	0	0	0	0	0
44	DF	(Bulgaria) Kaloyan Pehlivanov	7	0	0	0	0	0	1	0	0	0	0	0	8	0	0
45	DF	(United States) Steven Ramos	3	0	0	0	0	0	0	0	0	0	0	0	3	0	0
80	DF	(El Salvador) Walmer Martinez	3	0	0	0	0	0	0	0	0	0	0	0	2	0	0
	Coach	(United States) Brian Kleiban	1	0	1	0	0	0	0	0	0	0	0	0	1	0	1
Total			82	0	3	12	1	0	9	0	0	0	0	0	103	1	4

== Awards and honors ==
=== USL League One Annual Awards ===
==== All-League honorees ====
Team	Position	Player	Ref.
Second	FW	(United States) Eduardo Blancas	

=== USL League One Player of the Month ===
Month	Player	Position	Ref
June	(United States) Eduardo Blancas	FW	

=== USL League One Player of the Week ===
Week	Player	Opponent	Position	Ref
6	(United States) Jimmie Villalobos	Chattanooga Red Wolves SC	MF	
17/18	(Haiti) Jerry Desdunes	FC Naples, Portland Hearts of Pine, and Union Omaha	MF	
27	(United States) Eduardo Blancas	Forward Madison FC	MF	

=== USL League One Team of the Week ===
Week	Player	Opponent	Position	Ref
3	(El Salvador) Alexis Cerritos	Richmond Kickers	FW	
5	(Mexico) Carlos Avilez	Westchester SC	GK	
5	(United States) Jimmie Villalobos	Westchester SC	MF	
5	(Nigeria) Emmanuel Alaribe	Westchester SC	FW	
5	(Bulgaria) Kaloyan Pehlivanov	Westchester SC	Bench	
5	(Jamaica) Vanie Clarke	Westchester SC	Coach	
6	(United States) Jimmie Villalobos	Chattanooga Red Wolves SC	MF	
6	(United States) Brian Kleiban	Chattanooga Red Wolves SC	Coach	
7	(United States) Eduardo Blancas	Spokane Velocity	MF	
10	(United States) Sebastian Cruz	Texoma FC	DF	
10	(Panama) Osvaldo Lay	Texoma FC	Bench	
11	(El Salvador) Alexis Cerritos	Greenville Triumph SC	FW	
11	(Philippines) Javier Mariona	Greenville Triumph SC	Bench	
12	(Philippines) Javier Mariona	Charlotte Independence	MF	
12	(United States) Sebastian Cruz	Charlotte Independence	Bench	
12	(United States) Eduardo Blancas	Charlotte Independence	Bench	
12	(El Salvador) Alexis Cerritos	Charlotte Independence	Bench	
14	(El Salvador) Walmer Martinez	Spokane Velocity	DF	
15	(United States) Sebastian Cruz	Westchester SC	DF	
15	(Panama) Osvaldo Lay	Westchester SC	MF	
15	(Haiti) Jerry Desdunes	Westchester SC	Bench	
16	(Mexico) Carlos Avilez	Portland Hearts of Pine	GK	
16	(United States) Sebastian Cruz	Portland Hearts of Pine	DF	
17/18	(Mexico) Carlos Avilez	FC Naples, Portland Hearts of Pine, and Union Omaha	GK	
17/18	(United States) Sebastian Cruz	FC Naples, Portland Hearts of Pine, and Union Omaha	DF	
17/18	(Italy) Luca Mastrantonio	FC Naples, Portland Hearts of Pine, and Union Omaha	DF	
17/18	(Haiti) Jerry Desdunes	FC Naples, Portland Hearts of Pine, and Union Omaha	MF	
17/18	(El Salvador) Walmer Martinez	FC Naples, Portland Hearts of Pine, and Union Omaha	MF	
17/18	(United States) Eduardo Blancas	FC Naples, Portland Hearts of Pine, and Union Omaha	FW	
17/18	(United States) Brian Kleiban	FC Naples, Portland Hearts of Pine, and Union Omaha	Coach	
17/18	(United States) Harrison Robledo	FC Naples, Portland Hearts of Pine, and Union Omaha	Bench	
21/22	(Trinidad and Tobago) Denzil Smith	Forward Madison FC	Bench	
24	(Haiti) Jerry Desdunes	Greenville Triumph SC	Bench	
25	(United States) Steven Ramos	Texoma FC	DF	
26	(Mexico) Carlos Avilez	Chattanooga Red Wolves SC	Bench	
26	(United States) Steven Ramos	Chattanooga Red Wolves SC	Bench	
27	(Colombia) Miguel Pajaro	Forward Madison FC	MF	
27	(United States) Eduardo Blancas	Forward Madison FC	MF	
28	(Haiti) Jerry Desdunes	One Knoxville SC	FW	
28	(Philippines) Javier Mariona	One Knoxville SC	Bench	
33	(United States) Sebastian Cruz	Richmond Kickers	Bench	
33	(United States) Eduardo Blancas	Richmond Kickers	Bench	
33	(United States) Jimmie Villalobos	Richmond Kickers	Bench	
34	(United States) Eduardo Blancas	Portland Hearts of Pine	MF	

=== USL Jägermeister Cup Team of the Round ===
Round	Player	Opponent	Position	Ref
4	(United States) Christian Ortiz	Monterey Bay FC	DF	

=== USL Jägermeister Cup Goal of the Round ===
Round	Player	Opponent	Position	Ref
4	(United States) Adam Aoumaich	Monterey Bay FC	MF	

=== USL League One Goal of the Week ===
Week	Player	Opponent	Position	Ref
5	(United States) Jimmie Villalobos	Westchester SC	MF	
6	(United States) Jimmie Villalobos	Chattanooga Red Wolves SC	MF	
17/18	(United States) Eduardo Blancas	FC Naples	FW	

=== USL League One Coach of the Month ===
Month	Coach	Ref
June	(United States) Brian Kleiban	

=== USL League One Annual Awards ===
==== USL League One All-League Team honorees ====
Player	Team	Position	Ref
(United States) Eduardo Blancas	Second	MF	
