= 2025 USL League One season =

USL League One
- Season: 2025
- Dates: March 7 – October 25 (regular season); November 1 – November 14-16 (playoffs)
- Champions: One Knoxville SC (1st title)
- Players' Shield: One Knoxville SC (1st title)
- Matches: 209
- Goals: 597 (2.86 per match)
- Top goalscorer: (Honduras) Juan Carlos Obregón; Westchester SC (17 goals)
- Biggest home win: 5 goals: OMA 5–0 TEX (September 6); POR 6–1 SPK (October 21)
- Biggest away win: 4 goals: GRE 0–4 SPO (March 29)
- Highest scoring: 9 goals: CHT 4–5 GRE (August 9)
- Longest winning run: 6 matches: South Georgia Tormenta FC (August 30 - October 3)
- Longest unbeaten run: 13 matches: Chattanooga Red Wolves SC (July 5 – September 27)
- Longest winless run: 14 matches: AV Alta FC (July 16 – October 10)
- Longest losing run: 4 matches: Texoma FC (March 22 - April 13); South Georgia Tormenta FC (April 20 – June 7); Forward Madison FC (June 7 – July 5); Charlotte Independence (August 20 – September 13); Greenville Triumph SC (August 23 – September 13); Richmond Kickers (September 13 – September 27)
- Highest attendance: 6,440; POR 6–1 SPK (October 21)
- Lowest attendance: 216; TEX 0–1 POR (July 12)
- Total attendance: 582,001
- Average attendance: 2,785
- All statistics correct as of November 22, 2025.

The 2025 USL League One season was the seventh season of USL League One, a professional men's soccer league in the third tier of the United States league system.

Fourteen teams participated in the 2025 season, playing 30 league games each. Five teams, AV Alta FC, FC Naples, Portland Hearts of Pine, Texoma FC, and Westchester SC, joined as expansion franchises. Lexington SC left to join USL Championship, Central Valley Fuego FC voluntarily left the league. The franchise agreement for the Northern Colorado Hailstorm FC was terminated when its owners filed for Chapter 11 bankruptcy. NoCo and Fuego's U23 team ended up in The League for Clubs.

The regular season was originally scheduled to start on March 8, though it actually started a day earlier on March 7. The 2025 season also includes a new format of the in-season tournament, the USL Cup (known as the USL Jägermeister Cup for sponsorship reasons). It features a group stage and knockout round between all 38 teams in the two professional USL leagues, the USL Championship and the USL League One. The tournament will be played between April and September.

Union Omaha were the defending league champions and Player's Shield winners.

One Knoxville defeated Spokane Velocity in the final 2–0 to win their first title, completing the USL League One 'double' after having won the Player's Shield only weeks earlier.

== Teams ==
Locations of teams for the 2025 USL League One season

Team	City	Stadium	Capacity	Head coach	Jersey manufacturer	Jersey sponsor
AV Alta FC	Lancaster, California	Lancaster Municipal Stadium (Note: Soccer specific stadium)	5,300	(United States) Brian Kleiban	Hummel	Parris Law Firm
Charlotte Independence	Charlotte, North Carolina	American Legion Memorial Stadium	10,500	(United States) Mike Jeffries	Capelli Sport	Novant Health
Chattanooga Red Wolves SC	East Ridge, Tennessee	CHI Memorial Stadium	2,500	(England) Scott Mackenzie	Adidas	Transcard
Forward Madison FC	Madison, Wisconsin	Breese Stevens Field	5,000	(United States) Matt Glaeser	Hummel	Dairyland Insurance
Greenville Triumph SC	Greenville, South Carolina	Paladin Stadium (Note: Shared facility)	16,000	(Bermuda) Rick Wright	Hummel	Scansource
FC Naples	Naples, Florida	Paradise Coast Sports Complex Stadium	5,000	(United States) Matt Poland	Hummel	Physicians Regional Healthcare System
One Knoxville SC	Knoxville, Tennessee	Covenant Health Park (Note: Baseball Park)	6,500	(United States) Ian Fuller	Hummel	KUB Fiber
Portland Hearts of Pine	Portland, Maine	Fitzpatrick Stadium	5,500	(United States) Bobby Murphy	Hummel	Visit Maine
Richmond Kickers	Richmond, Virginia	City Stadium	6,000	(United States) Darren Sawatzky	Hummel	Ukrop's
South Georgia Tormenta FC	Statesboro, Georgia	Tormenta Stadium	3,500	(Republic of Ireland) Mark McKeever	Puma	SubAir Sport
Spokane Velocity FC	Spokane, Washington	ONE Spokane Stadium	5,100	(England) Leigh Veidman	Capelli Sport	Local community sponsors
Texoma FC	Sherman, Texas	Historic Bearcat Stadium	6,500	(England) Adrian Forbes	Hummel	Sherman Medical Center
Union Omaha	Papillion, Nebraska	Werner Park	9,023	(Colombia) Vincenzo Candela (interim)	Hummel	Centris Federal Credit Union
Westchester SC	Mount Vernon, New York	The Stadium at Memorial Field	3,900	(Republic of Ireland) Dave Carton	Hummel	Northwell Health

=== Managerial changes ===
Team	Outgoing manager	Manner of departure	Date of vacancy	Incoming manager	Date of appointment
One Knoxville SC	(Serbia) Ilija Ilić (interim)	End of interim period	December 4, 2024	(United States) Ian Fuller	December 4, 2024
Union Omaha	(England) Dominic Casciato	Left club	July 8, 2025	(Colombia) Vincenzo Candela (interim)	July 9, 2025
South Georgia Tormenta FC	(Scotland) Ian Cameron	Left club	August 8, 2025	(Republic of Ireland) Mark McKeever (Note: McKeever was initially named the interim manager, but was appointed permanent manager on September 24.)	August 8, 2025

== Regular season ==
=== Format ===
Each team plays the others twice, home and away, plus four additional matches. The top eight teams at the end of the season will qualify for the playoffs.

=== League table ===
Pos	Team	Pld	W	L	T	GF	GA	GD	Pts	Qualification
1	One Knoxville SC (S, C)	30	16	5	9	43	26	+17	57	Playoffs
2	Chattanooga Red Wolves SC	30	15	5	10	42	30	+12	55	Playoffs
3	Spokane Velocity FC	30	14	7	9	41	35	+6	51	Playoffs
4	FC Naples	30	13	9	8	40	32	+8	47	Playoffs
5	Union Omaha	30	13	10	7	51	39	+12	46	Playoffs
6	South Georgia Tormenta FC	30	13	11	6	55	47	+8	45 (Note: South Georgia is ahead of Portland on total wins, South Georgia 13, Portland 11)	Playoffs
7	Portland Hearts of Pine	30	11	7	12	48	38	+10	45	Playoffs
8	Charlotte Independence	30	10	13	7	45	50	−5	37	Playoffs
9	AV Alta FC	30	8	10	12	42	47	−5	36	
10	Forward Madison FC	30	8	11	11	31	43	−12	35	
11	Greenville Triumph SC	30	8	14	8	38	43	−5	32	
12	Texoma FC	30	7	14	9	35	55	−20	30	
13	Richmond Kickers	30	8	17	5	43	53	−10	29	
14	Westchester SC	30	5	16	9	43	59	−16	24	

Source: USL League One
Rules for classification: 1) points; 2) total wins; 3) total goal differential; 4) total goals scored; 5) points earned against top four finishers; 6) disciplinary points; 7) drawing of lots.
(C) Champions; (S) Players' Shield winner

=== Results table ===
Color Key: Home • Away • Win • Loss • Draw
Club	Match																													
Club	1	2	3	4	5	6	7	8	9	10	11	12	13	14	15	16	17	18	19	20	21	22	23	24	25	26	27	28	29	30
AV Alta FC (AVA)	TRM	RIC	WES	CHA	SPK	TXO	GVL	CLT	SPK	WES	POR	NAP	POR	OMA	KNX	NAP	MAD	SPK	GVL	TXO	OMA	CHA	MAD	KNX	TRM	NAP	TXO	CLT	RIC	POR
AV Alta FC (AVA)	0–2	1–3	2–0	3–2	1–2	0–0	2–2	2–1	0–0	5–2	1–1	4–1	2–0	2–1	1-3	1-1	0-0	0–2	1-1	3-3	0–2	0-0	3-3	1–2	0-3	0–4	1–1	2–3	2–0	2-2
Charlotte Independence (CLT)	RIC	CHA	GVL	MAD	TRM	TXO	WES	KNX	AVA	TRM	SPK	GVL	TXO	OMA	MAD	POR	KNX	TXO	GVL	WES	OMA	POR	CHA	NAP	RIC	KNX	SPK	AVA	CHA	NAP
Charlotte Independence (CLT)	1–0	0–0	0–1	1–1	3–2	4–3	3–2	3–1	1–2	2–0	1–1	1–0	2–3	1–2	1–1	1–1	2-2	3–3	4-5	1–0	1-4	2-4	0–1	0–1	3–2	0–1	0–1	3–2	1–2	0–2
Chattanooga Red Wolves SC (CHA)	NAP	CLT	TRM	AVA	GVL	RIC	NAP	TRM	POR	NAP	GVL	KNX	RIC	TXO	SPK	WES	MAD	OMA	TXO	TRM	AVA	CLT	POR	SPK	OMA	KNX	GVL	MAD	CLT	WES
Chattanooga Red Wolves SC (CHA)	1–1	0–0	2–2	2–3	1–0	0–0	3–1	2–1	2–1	2–2	1–3	1–0	2–0	1–1	3-0	3-1	2–1	2–2	1–0	2–0	0-0	1–0	1–1	2–1	0–3	0–2	0-0	1–2	2–1	2–1
Forward Madison FC (MAD)	NAP	RIC	CLT	TXO	OMA	KNX	WES	POR	OMA	SPK	WES	TXO	GVL	CLT	TRM	AVA	CHA	KNX	NAP	SPK	TXO	TRM	AVA	RIC	GVL	WES	POR	CHA	OMA	RIC
Forward Madison FC (MAD)	0–2	2–1	1–1	1–1	0–0	1–1	1–1	1–1	0–1	1–2	1–2	0–2	3–1	1–1	1-0	0–0	1–2	2–2	0–0	0–1	3–0	0–4	3-3	1–0	0–3	1–0	3–1	2–1	0–4	1-5
Greenville Triumph SC (GVL)	WES	OMA	SPK	CLT	KNX	CHA	RIC	AVA	TXO	NAP	OMA	CLT	CHA	WES	MAD	POR	RIC	TRM	CLT	AVA	TXO	POR	NAP	TRM	MAD	SPK	CHA	OMA	TRM	KNX
Greenville Triumph SC (GVL)	1–1	3–0	0–4	1–0	0–1	0–1	3–3	2–2	0–1	1–1	0–1	0–1	3–1	3–0	1–3	1–3	2–0	2–2	5-4	1–1	0–1	3–2	1–2	1–2	3–0	1–0	0-0	0-0	1–4	0–1
FC Naples (NAP)	CHA	MAD	SPK	POR	TXO	RIC	KNX	CHA	POR	OMA	GVL	CHA	TRM	AVA	WES	AVA	RIC	TRM	TXO	MAD	KNX	WES	GVL	CLT	POR	AVA	OMA	WES	SPK	CLT
FC Naples (NAP)	1–1	2–0	1–0	0–0	3–0	2–1	0–1	1–3	1–2	3–1	1–1	2–2	1–2	1–4	2–1	1–1	2–1	2–1	2–1	0–0	0–0	2-2	2–1	1–0	0–1	4–0	1–2	0–2	0–1	2-0
One Knoxville SC (KNX)	SPK	TXO	GVL	NAP	POR	MAD	CLT	WES	TRM	CHA	TRM	AVA	WES	CLT	POR	MAD	OMA	RIC	RIC	NAP	SPK	TRM	AVA	OMA	CLT	CHA	RIC	POR	TXO	GVL
One Knoxville SC (KNX)	2–2	2–0	1–0	1–0	1–1	1–1	1–3	1–1	3–0	0–1	2–1	3-1	1–1	2–2	1–0	2–2	1–0	2–0	0–1	0–0	1–0	1–2	2–1	2–2	1–0	2–0	1–2	3–1	2–1	1-0
Portland Hearts of Pine (POR)	NAP	SPK	TRM	KNX	OMA	NAP	MAD	CHA	OMA	AVA	AVA	TRM	TXO	GVL	CLT	KNX	RIC	WES	CLT	GVL	CHA	RIC	NAP	TXO	OMA	MAD	KNX	WES	SPK	AVA
Portland Hearts of Pine (POR)	0–0	0–0	1–2	1–1	2–2	2–1	1–1	1–2	3–1	1–1	0–2	1–1	1–0	3-1	1–1	0–1	0–0	3-2	4-2	3-2	1–1	5-2	1–0	1–0	0–1	1–3	1–3	2–2	6–1	2-2
Richmond Kickers (RIC)	TRM	CLT	AVA	MAD	OMA	NAP	WES	GVL	CHA	SPK	WES	TXO	SPK	OMA	CHA	GVL	NAP	POR	TRM	KNX	KNX	WES	MAD	POR	CLT	TRM	KNX	TXO	AVA	MAD
Richmond Kickers (RIC)	4–2	0–1	3–1	1–2	1–0	1–2	4–4	3–3	0–0	0–1	2–2	1–2	0–1	4–3	0–2	0–2	1–2	0–0	2-3	0–2	1–0	2–0	0–1	2–5	2–3	2–4	2-1	0–1	0–2	5-1
Tormenta FC (TRM)	RIC	AVA	OMA	CHA	POR	CLT	SPK	CHA	CLT	TXO	KNX	NAP	POR	KNX	OMA	MAD	GVL	NAP	WES	RIC	CHA	MAD	KNX	GVL	AVA	RIC	WES	SPK	GVL	TXO
Tormenta FC (TRM)	2–4	2–0	1–3	2–2	2–1	2–3	0–1	1–2	0–2	2–2	0–3	2–1	1–1	1–2	2–1	0–1	2–2	1–2	3-3	3-2	0–2	4-0	2–1	2-1	3-0	4–2	3–1	1–1	4-1	3-0
Spokane Velocity FC (SPK)	KNX	NAP	GVL	POR	TXO	AVA	WES	TRM	RIC	AVA	CLT	MAD	RIC	TXO	WES	CHA	OMA	AVA	MAD	KNX	WES	TXO	OMA	CHA	GVL	CLT	TRM	NAP	POR	OMA
Spokane Velocity FC (SPK)	2–2	0-1	4–0	0–0	4–1	2–1	3–1	1–0	1–0	0–0	1–1	2–1	1–0	1–1	0-3	0-3	2–1	2–0	1–0	0-1	2-1	3–3	2–2	1–2	0–1	1–0	1–1	1–0	1–6	2–2
Texoma FC (TXO)	KNX	WES	NAP	SPK	MAD	CLT	AVA	OMA	GVL	RIC	TRM	CLT	SPK	MAD	POR	CHA	CLT	NAP	CHA	AVA	GVL	MAD	OMA	SPK	WES	POR	AVA	RIC	KNX	TRM
Texoma FC (TXO)	0–2	1–3	0–3	1–4	1–1	3–4	0–0	2–1	1–0	2–1	2–2	3–2	1–1	2–0	0–1	1–1	3-3	1-2	0–1	3-3	1–0	0–3	0–5	3–3	1–2	0–1	1–1	1–0	1–2	0–3
Union Omaha (OMA)	GVL	TRM	RIC	MAD	POR	TXO	NAP	MAD	GVL	POR	RIC	AVA	CLT	TRM	SPK	WES	CHA	KNX	CLT	AVA	TXO	WES	SPK	KNX	CHA	POR	NAP	GVL	MAD	SPK
Union Omaha (OMA)	0–3	3-1	0–1	0–0	2–2	1–2	1–3	1-0	1–0	1–3	3–4	1–2	2–1	1–2	1–2	2–1	2–2	0–1	4–1	2–0	5–0	2–1	2–2	2–2	3–0	1–0	2–1	0-0	4–0	2–2
Westchester SC (WES)	GVL	TXO	AVA	RIC	SPK	CLT	MAD	RIC	KNX	AVA	MAD	GVL	NAP	SPK	KNX	CHA	OMA	TRM	CLT	POR	NAP	RIC	SPK	OMA	TXO	MAD	TRM	NAP	POR	CHA
Westchester SC (WES)	1–1	3–1	0–2	4–4	1–3	2–3	1–1	2–2	1–1	2–5	2–1	0–3	1–2	3–0	1–1	1–3	1–2	3-3	0–1	2-3	2-2	0–2	1–2	1–2	2–1	0–1	1–3	2–0	2–2	1–2

== Playoffs ==
The 2025 USL League One Playoffs (branded as the 2025 USL League One Playoffs presented by TERMINIX for sponsorship reasons) is the post-season championship of the USL League One season.

=== Bracket ===
Quarterfinals
1	(Tennessee) One Knoxville SC	2
8	(North Carolina) Charlotte Independence	1
4	(Florida) FC Naples	0 (4)
5	(Nebraska) Union Omaha	0 (3)
2	(Tennessee) Chattanooga Red Wolves SC	0
7	(Maine) Portland Hearts of Pine	1
3	(Washington (state)) Spokane Velocity	1 (4)
6	(Georgia (U.S. state)) South Georgia Tormenta FC	1 (3)

Semifinals
1	(Tennessee) One Knoxville SC	1
4	(Florida) FC Naples	0
7	(Maine) Portland Hearts of Pine	2 (5)
3	(Washington (state)) Spokane Velocity	2 (6)

Final
1	(Tennessee) One Knoxville SC	2
3	(Washington (state)) Spokane Velocity	0

=== Schedule ===
==== Quarterfinals ====
1 November 2025	Chattanooga Red Wolves SC	0–1	Portland Hearts of Pine	East Ridge, Tennessee
7 PM ET		Report	Green (yellow card) 26'; Keegan (yellow card) 53'; Wright 55'; James (yellow card) 67'	Stadium: CHI Memorial Stadium; Attendance: 2,203; Referee: Muhammad Hassan

1 November 2025	FC Naples	0–0 (a.e.t.) (4–3 p)	Union Omaha	Naples, Florida
7:30 pm ET	Henderlong (yellow card) 45+1'; Ferrín (yellow card) 49'; O'Connor (yellow card) 76'; Cisneros (yellow card) 107'	Report	Acoff (yellow card) 90+4'; Kasim (yellow card) 99'	Stadium: Paradise Coast Sports Complex Stadium; Attendance: 3,636; Referee: Cristian Campo
	Penalties
	Prpa (penalty scored); Pasnik (penalty missed); Dengler (penalty scored); O'Connor (penalty missed); Onen (penalty scored); Garrett (penalty scored)		(penalty scored) Ors; (penalty missed) Jiba; (penalty scored) Faz; (penalty missed) Ostrem; (penalty scored) Martinez; (penalty missed) Bronnik

2 November 2025	One Knoxville SC	2–1	Charlotte Independence	Knoxville, Tennessee
4 PM ET	Haugli 17'; Zarokostas 64'; Kelly (yellow card) 74'	Report	Chaney 78'	Stadium: Covenant Health Park; Attendance: 4,635; Referee: Atahan Yaya

2 November 2025	Spokane Velocity	1–1 (a.e.t.) (4–3 p)	South Georgia Tormenta FC	Spokane, Washington
8 PM ET	Lewis (yellow card) 17'; Veidman (yellow card) 74'; Garcia (yellow card) 92'; Reedy (yellow card) 99'; Peláez 115' (pen.)	Report	Cabral (yellow card) 90'; Tunbridge 95' (pen.) (yellow card) 107'; Pack (yellow card) 114'	Stadium: ONE Spokane Stadium; Attendance: 2,842; Referee: Gerald Flores
	Penalties
	Vinyals (penalty scored); Hernández (penalty scored); Peláez (penalty scored); Garcia (penalty scored)		(penalty scored) Walker; (penalty scored) Alves; (penalty scored) Reid-Stephen; (penalty missed) Tunbridge; (penalty missed) Cabral

==== Semifinals ====
8 November 2025	One Knoxville SC	1–0	FC Naples	Knoxville, Tennessee
7:00 PM EDT	Zarokostas (yellow card) 40'; Fuller (yellow card) 62'; Tekiela 66'; Skelton (yellow card) 70'	Report	Cisneros (yellow card) 42'	Stadium: Covenant Health Park; Attendance: 4,285; Referee: John Griggs

9 November 2025	Spokane Velocity	2–2 (a.e.t.) (6–5 p)	Portland Hearts of Pine	Spokane, Washington
6:00 PM PDT	Gil 45'; Miller (yellow card) 90+1'; Lewis (yellow card) 90+1'; Vinyals 120+1'; Hernandez (yellow card) 120+4'	Report	Wright 53' (yellow card) 70'; Green (yellow card) 60'; Kamara (yellow card) 90+6' (goal) 92'	Stadium: ONE Spokane Stadium; Attendance: 2,680; Referee: Elvis Osmanovic
	Penalties
	Vinyals (penalty scored); Peláez (penalty scored); Lewis (penalty missed); Hernandez (penalty scored); García (penalty scored); Miller (penalty scored); Crisler (penalty scored)		(penalty scored) Keegan; (penalty scored) Coulibaly; (penalty scored) Liadi; (penalty scored) Wada; (penalty missed) Kamara; (penalty scored) Messer; (penalty missed) Poon-Angeron

==== USL League One Final ====
16 November 2025	One Knoxville SC	2–0	Spokane Velocity	Knoxville, Tennessee
5 PM ET	Rosamilia 4'; Tekiela 54' (pen.); Caputo (yellow card) 66'; Diene (yellow card) 72'	Report		Stadium: Covenant Health Park; Attendance: 7,500; Referee: Brandon Stevis

Championship Game MVP: (United States) Nico Rosamilia (KNX)

== Attendance ==
=== Average home attendances ===
Ranked from highest to lowest average attendance.

Team	GP	Total	High	Low	Average
Portland Hearts of Pine	15	87,439	6,440	5,680	5,829
Richmond Kickers	15	66,240	5,542	2,827	4,416
AV Alta FC	15	62,888	5,433	3,403	4,193
Forward Madison FC	15	59,859	5,010	3,368	3,991
FC Naples	15	52,314	4,618	2,267	3,488
Union Omaha	15	45,640	4,429	1,499	3,043
One Knoxville SC	14‡	42,415	5,420	1,547	3,030
Spokane Velocity FC	15	35,204	2,848	1,680	2,347
Greenville Triumph SC	15	31,303	3,883	1,080	2,087
Chattanooga Red Wolves SC	15	30,811	2,204	1,986	2,054
Westchester SC	15†	23,774	2,958	1,078	1,698
Texoma FC	15	19,086	3,209	216	1,272
Charlotte Independence	15	10,709	1,057	565	714
Tormenta FC	15	10,196	1,079	377	680
Total	209*	582,001	6,440	216	2,785

- † 1 match forfeited
- * 1 match missing
- ‡ 1 match was moved to City Stadium in Richmond

== Player statistics ==
As of October 25, 2025

=== Goals ===
Rank	Player	Club	Goals
1	(Honduras) Juan Carlos Obregón	Westchester SC	17
2	(United States) Karsen Henderlong	FC Naples	14
3	(Barbados) Niall Reid-Stephen	South Georgia Tormenta FC	13
4	(United States) Christian Chaney	Charlotte Independence	12
5	(United States) Derek Gebhard	Forward Madison FC	11
5	(United States) Eduardo Blancas	AV Alta FC	11
5	(Israel) Yaniv Bazini	South Georgia Tormenta FC	11
8	(Spain) Sergio Ors	Union Omaha	10
8	(United States) Pedro Hernández	Chattanooga Red Wolves SC	10
8	(Senegal) Babacar Diene	One Knoxville SC	10

=== Hat-tricks ===
Player	Team	Against	Score	Date
(Cameroon) Souaibou Marou	Charlotte Independence	Westchester SC	2–3 (A)	May 10
(England) Ollie Wright	Portland Hearts of Pine	Union Omaha	3–1 (H)	June 14
(United States) Eduardo Blancas	AV Alta FC	FC Naples	4–1 (H)	June 28
(Jamaica) Chevone Marsh	Greenville Triumph SC	Charlotte Independence	4–5 (A)	August 9
(Japan) Masashi Wada	Portland Hearts of Pine	Richmond Kickers	2–5 (A)	September 17
(Ghana) Ropapa Mensah	Greenville Triumph SC	Forward Madison FC	3–0 (H)	September 20

Notes

(H) – Home team
(A) – Away team

Scored four goals.

=== Assists ===
Rank	Player	Club	Assists
1	(United States) Charlie Ostrem	Union Omaha	10
2	(Spain) Jon Bakero	Charlotte Independence	9
3	(England) Ollie Wright	Portland Hearts of Pine	8
4	(Barbados) Niall Reid-Stephen	South Georgia Tormenta FC	7
4	(England) Mason Tunbridge	South Georgia Tormenta FC	7
6	(United States) Sebastian Cruz	AV Alta FC	6
6	(Greece) Stavros Zarokostas	One Knoxville SC	6
6	(United States) Connor Evans	Greenville Triumph SC	6
9	(United States) Isidro Martinez	Union Omaha	5
9	(Spain) Rodrigo Robles	Greenville Triumph SC	5
9	(Haiti) Jerry Desdunes	AV Alta FC	5
9	(Republic of Ireland) Kevin O'Connor	FC Naples	5
9	(United States) Eduardo Blancas	AV Alta FC	5
9	(United States) Simon Fitch	Richmond Kickers	5

=== Clean sheets ===
Rank	Player	Club	Clean Sheets
1	(United States) Jason Smith	Chattanooga Red Wolves SC	11
2	(United States) Sean Lewis	One Knoxville SC	10
2	(Mexico) Carlos Merancio	Spokane Velocity FC	10
4	(United States) Gunther Rankenburg	Greenville Triumph SC	8
4	(United States) Edward Delgado	FC Naples	8
6	(Ghana) Rashid Nuhu	Union Omaha	7
7	(Philippines) Bernd Schipmann	Forward Madison FC	6
7	(United States) Hunter Morse	Portland Hearts of Pine	6
9	(United States) Javier Garcia	Texoma FC	5
9	(United States) Matt Levy	Charlotte Independence	5

=== Saves ===
Rank	Player	Club	Saves
1	(United States) Hunter Morse	Portland Hearts of Pine	83
2	(Mexico) Carlos Merancio	Spokane Velocity FC	77
3	(United States) Austin Pack	South Georgia Tormenta FC	76
4	(United States) James Sneddon	Richmond Kickers	74
5	(United States) Javier Garcia	Texoma FC	70
6	(United States) Gunther Rankenburg	Greenville Triumph SC	66
7	(United States) Matt Levy	Charlotte Independence	64
8	(United States) Edward Delgado	FC Naples	61
9	(United States) Sean Lewis	One Knoxville SC	59
10	(Mexico) Carlos Avilez	AV Alta FC	58

== League awards ==
=== Individual awards ===
Award	Winner	Team	Reason	Ref.
Player of the Year	(Honduras) Juan Carlos Obregón Jr.	Westchester SC	17 goals	
Golden Boot	(Honduras) Juan Carlos Obregón Jr.	Westchester SC	17 goals	
Golden Glove	(United States) Jason Smith	Chattanooga Red Wolves SC	11 shutouts; 0.875 goals against average; 43 saves	
Golden Playmaker	(United States) Charlie Ostrem	Union Omaha	10 assists	
Defender of the Year	(England) Jordan Skelton	One Knoxville SC	34 blocked shots	
Young Player of the Year	(United States) Mark Bronnik	Union Omaha	6 goals at 19 years old	
Goalkeeper of the Year	(United States) Sean Lewis	One Knoxville SC	73.4 save percentage on 59 saves	
Coach of the Year	(Scotland) Scott Mackenzie	Chattanooga Red Wolves SC	Best campaign in club history, 1.011 ppg improvement over 2024 season	
Most Valuable Performer	(Colombia) Anuar Peláez	Spokane Velocity FC	+6.59 goals added mark, 1.4 goals per game	
Comeback Player of the Year	(United States) Mikey Lopez	Portland Hearts of Pine	55 tackles at a 72.2% success rate, two assists, 43 interceptions and 124 recoveries after an Achilles tear the previous season	
Goal of the Year	(Trinidad and Tobago) Nathaniel James	Portland Hearts of Pine	Goal on October 21 against Spokane Velocity FC	
Save of the Year	(United States) Hunter Morse	Portland Hearts of Pine	Save on August 9 against Richmond Kickers	

=== All-league teams ===
First Team
Goalkeeper	Defenders	Midfielders	Forwards
(United States) Sean Lewis (KNX) (Goalkeeper of the Year)	(Spain) David García (SPK) (England) Nathan Messer (POR) (England) Jordan Skelton (KNX) (Defender of the Year) (Republic of Ireland) Declan Watters (CHA)	(United States) Luis Gil (SPK) (Germany) Max Schneider (OMA) (Japan) Masashi Wada (POR)	(United States) Karsen Henderlong (NAP) (Honduras) Juan Carlos Obregón Jr. (WES) (MVP and Golden Boot) (Barbados) Niall Reid-Stephen (TOR)

Second Team
Goalkeeper	Defenders	Midfielders	Forwards
(Mexico) Carlos Merancio (SPK)	(Jamaica) Jaheim Brown (KNX) (United States) Jake Dengler (NAP) (United States) Brecc Evans (NAP) (United States) Charlie Ostrem (OMA) (Golden Playmaker)	(United States) Eduardo Blancas (AVA) (Senegal) Bachir Ndiaye (CLT) (United States) Ajmeer Spengler (TXO)	(Senegal) Babacar Diene (KNX) (United States) Derek Gebhard (MAD) (England) Ollie Wright (POR)

=== Midseason awards ===
Goalkeeper of the Year				Defender of the Year		Coach of the Year		Young Player of the Year		Player of the Year		References
(United States) Matt Levy	Charlotte Independence	(United States) Javier Garcia	Texoma FC	(United States Virgin Islands) Joshua Ramos	Chattanooga Red Wolves SC	(England) Leigh Veidman	Spokane Velocity	(United States) Rafael Jauregui	Charlotte Independence	(Colombia) Anuar Peláez	Spokane Velocity	

=== Monthly awards ===
Month	Player of the Month			Coach of the Month		References
Month	Player	Club	Position	Coach	Club	References
March	(United States) Karsen Henderlong	FC Naples	Forward	(United States) Matt Poland	FC Naples	
April	(Colombia) Anuar Peláez	Spokane Velocity FC	Forward	(United States) Ian Fuller	One Knoxville SC	
May	(United States) Javier Garcia	Texoma FC	Goalkeeper	(United States) Bobby Murphy	Portland Hearts of Pine	
June	(United States) Eduardo Blancas	AV Alta FC	Forward	(United States) Brian Kleiban	AV Alta FC	
July	(Spain) Rodrigo Robles	Greenville Triumph SC	Midfielder	(Scotland) Scott Mackenzie	Chattanooga Red Wolves SC	
August	(England) Ollie Wright	Portland Hearts of Pine	Midfielder	(Scotland) Scott Mackenzie	Chattanooga Red Wolves SC	
September	(Spain) Sergio Ors Navarro	Union Omaha	Midfielder	(Scotland) Mark McKeever	South Georgia Tormenta FC	
October	(Senegal) Babacar Diene	One Knoxville SC	Forward	(United States) Ian Fuller	One Knoxville SC	

=== Weekly awards ===
Player of the Week
Week	Player	Club	Position	Reason	Ref.
1	(England) Mason Tunbridge	South Georgia Tormenta FC	Forward	2 goals in loss vs Richmond, first brace of the season	
2	(Colombia) Leonardo Castro	Greenville Triumph SC	Forward	2 goals; 1 assist vs Omaha	
3	(Argentina) Emiliano Terzaghi	Richmond Kickers	Forward	record 11th brace vs AV Alta	
4	(Nigeria) Lucky Opara	Spokane Velocity	Defender	2 assists vs Texoma	
5	(Colombia) Leonardo Castro	Greenville Triumph SC	Forward	GWG vs Charlotte	
6	(United States) Jimmie Villalobos	AV Alta FC	Midfielder	2 goals vs Chattanooga	
7	(Trinidad and Tobago) Noah Powder	Westchester SC	Midfielder	1 goal; 2 assists vs Richmond	
9	(United States) Pierre Reedy	Spokane Velocity	Forward	1 goal; 2 assists vs Westchester	
10	(Cameroon) Souaibou Marou	Charlotte Independence	Forward	Hat trick in comeback victory vs Westchester	
11	(Colombia) Leonardo Castro	Greenville Triumph SC	Forward	2 goals in 6 minutes vs AV Alta	
12	(United States Virgin Islands) Josh Ramos	Chattanooga Red Wolves	Defender	Presence in win vs South Georgia	
14	(Ghana) Rashid Nuhu	Union Omaha	Goalkeeper	6 save shutout vs Madison	
15	(Honduras) Ollie Wright	Portland Hearts of Pine	Midfielder	Hat trick vs Omaha	
16	(United States) Ajmeer Spengler	Texoma FC	Midfielder	1 goal; 1 assist vs Charlotte	
17/18	(Haiti) Jerry Desdunes	AV Alta FC	Midfielder	2 goals; 3 assists in 3 games	
19	(Spain) Dani Fernández	One Knoxville SC	Defender	GWG vs South Georgia in Knoxville's 100th match	
20	(United States) Omar Hernandez	Chattanooga Red Wolves SC	Midfielder	2 goals in 2 games	
21/22	(Spain) Jon Bakero	Charlotte Independence	Midfielder	4 assists in 2 games	
23	(Jamaica) Chevone Marsh	Greenville Triumph SC	Midfielder	Hattrick vs Charlotte	
24	(United States) Jason Smith	Chattanooga Red Wolves SC	Goalkeeper	5 save shutout vs Texoma	
25	(United States) Ryan Becher	Union Omaha	Midfielder	2 goals; 1 assist	
26	(Honduras) Ollie Wright	Portland Hearts of Pine	Midfielder	1 goal; 2 assists vs Charlotte	
27	(United States) Eduardo Blancas	AV Alta FC	Midfielder	2 goals; 1 assist vs Madison	
28	(Jamaica) Neco Brett	Spokane Velocity	Forward	1 goal; 1 assist vs Texoma	
29	(Spain) Sergio Ors	Union Omaha	Midfielder	4 goals in 2 games	
30	(Barbados) Niall Reid-Stephen	South Georgia Tormenta FC	Forward	2 goals; 1 assist vs Richmond	
31	(Mexico) Carlos Merancio	Spokane Velocity	Goalkeeper	9 saves shutout vs Charlotte	
32	(United States) Christian Chaney	Charlotte Independence	Forward	1 goal; match winning assist vs AV Alta	
33	(Honduras) Juan Carlos Obregón	Westchester SC	Forward	2 goals vs Portland	
34	(United States) Simon Fitch	Richmond Kickers	Goalkeeper	3 assists vs Madison	

Goal of the Week
Week	Player	Club	Opponent	Ref.
1	(United States) Dakota Barnathan	Richmond Kickers	Tormenta FC	
2	(Honduras) Angelo Kelly-Rosales	One Knoxville SC	Spokane Velocity FC	
3	(Republic of Ireland) Mark Doyle	One Knoxville SC	Texoma FC	
4	(United States) Dion Acoff	Union Omaha	Tormenta FC	
5	(United States) Jimmie Villalobos	AV Alta FC	Westchester SC	
6	(United States) Jimmie Villalobos	AV Alta FC	Chattanooga Red Wolves SC	
7	(United States) Zahir Vazquez	Chattanooga Red Wolves SC	Greenville Triumph SC	
8	No League One matches due to Jägermeister Cup			
9	(United States) Joshua Kirkland	Richmond Kickers	Texoma FC	
10	(Ghana) Samuel Owusu	Union Omaha	Portland Hearts of Pine	
11	(Honduras) Juan Carlos Obregón Jr.	Westchester SC	Forward Madison FC	
12	(Uganda) Jayden Onen	FC Naples	Union Omaha	
13	No League One matches due to Jägermeister Cup			
14	(United States) Karsen Henderlong	FC Naples	Greenville Triumph SC	
15	(England) Ollie Wright	Portland Hearts of Pine	Union Omaha	
16	(United States) Azaad Liadi	Portland Hearts of Pine	AV Alta FC	
17	(United States) Eduardo Blancas	AV Alta FC	FC Naples	
18	(United States) Eduardo Blancas	AV Alta FC	FC Naples	
19	(United States) Karsen Henderlong	FC Naples	Westchester SC	
20	(United States) Omar Hernandez	Chattanooga Red Wolves SC	Texoma FC	
21	(Denmark) Mikkel Gøling	One Knoxville SC	Portland Hearts of Pine	
22	(Denmark) Mikkel Gøling	One Knoxville SC	Portland Hearts of Pine	
23	(Jamaica) Chevone Marsh	Greenville Triumph SC	Charlotte Independence	
24	(Senegal) Babacar Diene	One Knoxville SC	Union Omaha	
25	(England) Luke McCormick	Texoma FC	AV Alta FC	
26	(United States) Sean Vinberg	Portland Hearts of Pine	Charlotte Independence	
27	(Honduras) Juan Carlos Obregón Jr.	Westchester SC	Spokane Velocity FC	
28	(Democratic Republic of the Congo) Ferrety Sousa	Forward Madison FC	Richmond Kickers	
29	(United States) Matthew Acosta	Chattanooga Red Wolves SC	Spokane Velocity	
30	(England) Nathan Messer	Portland Hearts of Pine	Texoma FC	
31	(United States) Derek Gebhard	Forward Madison FC	Portland Hearts of Pine	
32	(Germany) Kempes Tekiela	One Knoxville SC	Portland Hearts of Pine	
33	(Honduras) Juan Carlos Obregón Jr.	Westchester SC	Portland Hearts of Pine	
34	(England) Nathan Messer	Portland Hearts of Pine	Spokane Velocity FC	

Save of the Week
Week	Player	Club	Opponent	Ref.
1	(United States) Jason Smith	Chattanooga Red Wolves SC	FC Naples	
2	(United States) Matt Levy	Charlotte Independence	Richmond Kickers	
3	(United States) Johan Garibay	One Knoxville SC	Texoma FC	
4	(United States) Gunther Rankenburg	Greenville Triumph SC	Spokane Velocity FC	
5	(United States) Matt Levy	Charlotte Independence	Greenville Triumph SC	
6	(United States) Gunther Rankenburg	Greenville Triumph SC	One Knoxville SC	
7	(United States) Sean Lewis	One Knoxville SC	FC Naples	
8	No League One matches due to Jägermeister Cup			
9	(United States) Hunter Morse	Portland Hearts of Pine	One Knoxville SC	
10	(United States) Andrew Hammersley	Westchester SC	Charlotte Independence	
11	(United States) Javier Garcia	Texoma FC	Union Omaha	
12	(United States) Javier Garcia	Texoma FC	Greenville Triumph	
13	No League One matches due to Jägermeister Cup			
14	(United States) Matt Levy	Charlotte Independence	Tormenta FC	
15	(United States) Gunther Rankenburg	Greenville Triumph SC	Charlotte Independence	
16	(Guatemala) Ricardo Jérez	Chattanooga Red Wolves SC	Greenville Triumph SC	
17	(United States) Javier Garcia	Texoma FC	Forward Madison FC	
18	(United States) Javier Garcia	Texoma FC	Forward Madison FC	
19	(United States) Gunther Rankenburg	Greenville Triumph SC	Forward Madison FC	
20	(United States) Jason Smith	Chattanooga Red Wolves SC	Spokane Velocity FC	
21	(United States) Javier Garcia	Texoma FC	Charlotte Independence	
22	(United States) Javier Garcia	Texoma FC	Charlotte Independence	
23	(United States) Hunter Morse	Portland Hearts of Pine	Richmond Kickers	
24	(United States) Javier Garcia	Texoma FC	Chattanooga Red Wolves SC	
25	(United States) Javier Garcia	Texoma FC	AV Alta FC	
26	(United States) Sean Lewis	One Knoxville SC	Spokane Velocity FC	
27	(United States) Javier Garcia	Texoma FC	One Knoxville SC	
28	(United States) Javier Garcia	Texoma FC	Spokane Velocity FC	
29	(United States) Hunter Morse	Portland Hearts of Pine	FC Naples	
30	(United States) Lalo Delgado	FC Naples	AV Alta FC	
31	(United States) Lalo Delgado	FC Naples	Union Omaha	
32	(Ghana) Rashid Nuhu	Union Omaha	Greenville Triumph SC	
33	(United States) Gunther Rankenburg	Greenville Triumph SC	Tormenta FC	
34	(United States) Javier Garcia	Texoma FC	Tormenta FC	

Team of the Week
Week	Goalkeeper	Defenders	Midfielders	Forwards	Bench	Coach	Ref.
**1**	(United States) J. Smith (CHA)	(United States) Adewole (WES) (United States) Dengler (NAP) (United States) Polak (GVL) (Chile) Schenfeld (RIC)	(Honduras) Espinal (RIC) (England) O'Dwyer (RIC) (Germany) Seufert (RIC) (Colombia) Velásquez (GVL)	(England) **Tunbridge** (TRM) (Honduras) Obregón Jr. (WES)	(United States) Rankenburg (GVL) (United States) Fitch (RIC) (United States) Anderson (RIC) (United States) Barnathan (RIC) (Colombia) Ferrín (NAP) (United States) O. Hernandez (CHA) (Barbados) Reid-Stephen (TRM)	(United States) Darren Sawatzky (RIC)	
**2**	(United States) Levy (CLT)	(United States) Miller (SPK) (Chile) Schenfeld (RIC) (United States) Waldeck (SPK)	(Honduras) Álvarez (CLT) (Honduras) Kelly-Rosales (KNX) (Uganda) Onen (NAP) (United States) Zakowski (GVL)	(Israel) Bazini (TRM) (Colombia) **Castro** (GVL) (United States) Henderlong (NAP)	(United States) Sneddon (RIC) (Jamaica) J. Brown (KNX) (Cameroon) Ngah (CLT) (Haiti) Sorenson (CLT) (United States) Cerro (NAP) (United States) C. Evans (GVL) (United States) Nyandjo (TRM)	(Bermuda) Rick Wright (GVL)	
**3**	(United States) Garibay (KNX)	(Jamaica) J. Brown (KNX) (United States) B. Evans (NAP) (Chile) Schenfeld (RIC) (United States) Waldeck (SPK)	(El Salvador) Cerritos (AVA) (Republic of Ireland) M. Doyle (KNX) (England) O'Dwyer (RIC)	(United States) Henderlong (NAP) (Germany) Tekiela (KNX) (Argentina) **Terzaghi** (RIC)	(United States) Delgado (NAP) (United States) Chavez (TEX) (United States) Miller (SPK) (England) Skelton (KNX) (Denmark) Gøling (KNX) (Germany) Seufert (RIC) (Spain) Torrellas (NAP)	(United States) Matt Poland (NAP)	
**4**	(Mexico) Merancio (SPK)	(United States) Acoff (OMA) (United States) Adewole (WES) (Nigeria) **Opara** (SPK) (United States) Ostrem (OMA)	(United States) Bolanos (WES) (United States) Gebhard (MAD) (United States) Gil (SPK) (Spain) Navarro (OMA) (Germany) Schneider (OMA)	(Colombia) Peláez (SPK)	(United States) Smith (CHA) (Honduras) Espinal (RIC) (Grenada) John-Brown (SPK) (United States) McGlynn (WES) (Trinidad and Tobago) N. Powder (WES) (United States) McManus (TEX) (Honduras) Obregón Jr. (WES)	(England) Leigh Veidman (SPK)	
**5**	(Mexico) Avilez (AVA)	(United States) Dengler (NAP) (United States) B. Evans (NAP) (Spain) D. García (SPK)	(United States) C. Evans (GVL) (United States) Heckenberg (NAP) (England) Tunbridge (TRM) (United States) Villalobos (AVA)	(Nigeria) Alaribe (AVA) (Colombia) **Castro** (GVL) (United States) Henderlong (NAP)	(United States) Levy (CLT) (United States) Bubb (GVL) (Bulgaria) Pehlivanov (AVA) (Peru) Fernandez (SPK) (United States) O. Hernandez (CHA) (United States) Herrera (GVL) (Grenada) John-Brown (SPK)	(United States) Vanie Clarke (AVA)	
**6**	(United States) Pack (TRM)	(United States) Bubb (GVL) (United States) Mehl (MAD) (Chile) Schenfeld (RIC) (United States) Waldeck (SPK)	(Honduras) Álvarez (CLT) (Colombia) Ferrín (NAP) (Grenada) John-Brown (SPK) (Honduras) Espinal (RIC) (United States) **Villalobos** (AVA)	(England) Bentley (CHA)	(United States) Garibay (KNX) (Nigeria) Opara (SPK) (Republic of Ireland) M. Doyle (KNX) (United States) Langlois (POR) (Jamaica) Lewis (SPK) (United States) Henderlong (NAP) (Colombia) Peláez (SPK)	(United States) Brian Kleiban (AVA)	
**7**	(Mexico) Merancio (SPK)	(Austria) Crull (MAD) (United States) B. Evans (NAP) (Trinidad and Tobago) S. Powder (WES)	(United States) Blancas (AVA) (United States) Gil (SPK) (England) O'Dwyer (RIC) (Trinidad and Tobago) **N. Powder** (WES)	(Honduras) Espinal (RIC) (United States) Kirkland (RIC) (Honduras) Obregón Jr. (WES)	(United States) McCready (TEX) (United States) Jimenez (TRM) (Spain) Bakero (CLT) (England) Denton (SPK) (United States) Gebhard (MAD) (Germany) Tekiela (KNX) (United States) Vazquez (CHA)	(United States) Ian Fuller (KNX)	
**8**	No League One matches due to Jägermeister Cup						
**9**	(Mexico) Merancio (SPK)	(United States) C. Evans (GVL) (United States) Mehl (MAD) (England) Messer (POR) (United States) Ritchie (KNX)	(Honduras) Álvarez (CLT) (United States) Kirkland (RIC) (United States) **Reedy** (SPK) (United States) Spengler (TEX)	(United States) Chaney (CLT) (Honduras) Midence (CLT)	(United States) Lewis (KNX) (England) Agyaakwah (GVL) (United States) Dimick (CLT) (Italy) Milanese (OMA) (Germany) Seufert (RIC) (Japan) Masashi (POR) (United States) Liadi (POR)	(England) Leigh Veidman (SPK)	
**10**	(United States) J. Garcia (TEX)	(Austria) Crull (MAD) (United States) Cruz (AVA) (Ghana) Owusu (OMA)	(Honduras) Álvarez (CLT) (United States) McGlynn (WES) (Honduras) Midence (CLT) (Greece) Zarokostas (CLT)	(United States) Gallardo (OMA) (Cameroon) **Marou** (CLT) (Honduras) Obregón Jr. (WES)	(United States) Sneddon (RIC) (United States) Waldeck (SPK) (Brazil) Cabral (TRM) (Panama) Lay (AVA) (United States) Rosamilia (KNX) (United States) Liadi (POR) (Colombia) Peláez (SPK)	(United States) Mike Jeffries (CLT)	
**11**	(United States) Hammersley (WES)	(United States) C. Evans (GVL) (Spain) D. García (SPK) (United States Virgin Islands) J. Ramos (CHA) (England) Skelton (KNX)	(United States) Gebhard (MAD) (United States) Spengler (TEX) (Cape Verde) Varela (POR)	(Colombia) **Castro** (GVL) (El Salvador) Cerritos (AVA) (United States) Chaney (CLT)	(United States) J. Garcia (TEX) (Senegal) Ciss (CLT) (Germany) Schneider (OMA) (Ghana) Asante (TEX) (Honduras) Álvarez (CLT) (United States) P. Hernández (CHA) (Philippines) Mariona (AVA)	(United States) Mike Jeffries (CLT)	
**12**	(United States) Lapsley (MAD)	(United States Virgin Islands) **J. Ramos** (CHA) (England) Messer (POR) (Nicaragua) Glasser (NAP)	(Philippines) Mariona (AVA) (Honduras) Espinal (RIC) (United States) Vazquez (CHA) (Uganda) Onen (NAP)	(United States) P. Hernández (CHA) (Honduras) Obregón Jr. (WES) (Colombia) Ferrín (NAP)	(United States) J. Garcia (TEX) (United States) Cruz (AVA) (England) Wright (POR) (United States) Blancas (AVA) (United States) Bolduc (RIC) (El Salvador) Cerritos (AVA) (Honduras) Álvarez (CLT)	(United States) Matt Poland (NAP)	
**13**	No League One matches due to Jägermeister Cup						
**14**	(Ghana) **Nuhu** (OMA)	(United States) Dengler (NAP) (United States) Drack (WES) (El Salvador) W. Martinez (AVA) (Republic of Ireland) Watters (CHA)	(England) Baker (TEX) (United States) I. Martinez (Omaha) (Liberia) Saydee (WES)	(Ghana) Asante (TEX) (United States) Chaney (CLT) (United States) Henderlong (NAP)	(United States) Levy (CLT) (Colombia) Ferrín (NAP) (Spain) Robles (GVL) (England) Bentley (CHA) (Colombia) Castro (GVL) (United States) Spengler (TEX) (Germany) Tekiela (KNX)	(England) Adrian Forbes (TEX)	
**15**	(United States) Morse (POR)	(Brazil) Alves (TRM) (United States) Cruz (AVA) (United States) Fricke (GVL) (Cameroon) Ngah (CLT)	(Netherlands) Guezen (WES) (United States) O. Hernandez (CHA) (Panama) Lay (AVA) (England) **Wright** (POR)	(United States) Chaney (CLT) (United States) Weiss (NAP)	(United States) Levy (CLT) (United States) Jaime (CLT) (Haiti) Desdunes (AVA) (United States) Gil (SPK) (Grenada) John-Brown (SPK) (Trinidad and Tobago) Poon-Angeron (POR) (Spain) Navarro (OMA)	(United States) Mike Jeffries (CLT)	
**16**	(Mexico) Avilez (AVA)	(United States) Cruz (AVA) (Norway) Haugli (KNX) (Cameroon) Ngah (CLT) (England) Sims (GVL)	(Liberia) Saydee (WES) (United States) **Spengler** (TEX) (England) Wright (POR)	(Colombia) Castro (GVL) (United States) Liadi (POR) (Honduras) Obregón Jr. (WES)	(United States) Lewis (KNX) (Nigeria) Opara (SPK) (Ghana) Asante (TEX) (Senegal) Diene (KNX) (Denmark) Gøling (KNX) (Senegal) Ndiaye (CLT) (Jamaica) Brett (SPK)	(Republic of Ireland) Dave Carton (WES)	
**17**	(Mexico) Avilez (AVA)	(United States) Calfo (TEX) (United States) Cruz (AVA) (Italy) Mastrantonio (AVA)	(Haiti) **Desdunes** (AVA) (El Salvador) W. Martinez (AVA) (Barbados) Reid-Stephen (TRM) (Spain) Robles (GVL) (Spain) Vinyals (SPK)	(United States) Blancas (AVA) (United States) Kirkland (RIC)	(United States) J. Garcia (TEX) (United States) Becher (OMA) (Poland) Bortniczuk (TEX) (Sierra Leone) Kamara (POR) (United States) Robledo (AVA) (Spain) Torrellas (NAP) (Colombia) Castro (GVL)	(United States) Brian Kleiban (AVA)	
**18**	(Mexico) Avilez (AVA)	(United States) Calfo (TEX) (United States) Cruz (AVA) (Italy) Mastrantonio (AVA)	(Haiti) **Desdunes** (AVA) (El Salvador) W. Martinez (AVA) (Barbados) Reid-Stephen (TRM) (Spain) Robles (GVL) (Spain) Vinyals (SPK)	(United States) Blancas (AVA) (United States) Kirkland (RIC)	(United States) J. Garcia (TEX) (United States) Becher (OMA) (Poland) Bortniczuk (TEX) (Sierra Leone) Kamara (POR) (United States) Robledo (AVA) (Spain) Torrellas (NAP) (Colombia) Castro (GVL)	(United States) Brian Kleiban (AVA)	
**19**	(United States) Morse (POR)	(Jamaica) N. Brown (MAD) (Spain) **Fernández** (KNX) (Italy) Milanese (OMA)	(United States) Becher (OMA) (England) Bentley (CHA) (Republic of Ireland) M. Doyle (KNX) (United States) Gebhard (MAD) (Spain) Torrellas (NAP)	(Brazil) Dourado (MAD) (United States) Henderlong (NAP)	(United States) J. Garcia (TEX) (Austria) Crull (MAD) (United States) Ostrem (OMA) (Germany) Schneider (OMA) (Japan) Masashi (POR) (England) Wright (POR) (Honduras) Obregón Jr. (WES)	(United States) Matt Poland (NAP)	
**20**	(United States) J. Smith (CHA)	(Jamaica) J. Brown (KNX) (United States) Cisneros (NAP) (Cameroon) Ngah (CLT) (England) Sims (GVL)	(United States) **O. Hernandez** (CHA) (United States) Herrera (GVL) (Senegal) Ndiaye (CLT) (United States) Rosamilia (KNX)	(Israel) Bazini (TRM) (United States) Washington (POR)	(United States) Morse (POR) (United States) Chavez (TEX) (Spain) Bakero (CLT) (United States) Becher (OMA) (United States) C. Evans (GVL) (United States) C. Garcia (GVL) (Honduras) Kelly-Rosales (KNX)	(Scotland) Scott Mackenzie (CHA)	
**21**	(Philippines) Schipmann (CHA)	(Cameroon) Ngah (CLT) (United States) Rasheed (TRM) (England) Skelton (KNX)	(England) Baker (TEX) (Spain) **Bakero** (CLT) (Denmark) Gøling (KNX) (United States) Prpa (NAP) (Spain) Vinyals (SPK)	(Colombia) Moreno (CLT ) (Spain) Robles (GVL)	(Trinidad and Tobago) D. Smith (AVA) (Spain) **Fernández** (KNX) (Senegal) Ndiaye (CLT) (Spain) Torrellas (NAP) (Brazil) Ualefi (CHA) (Honduras) Obregón Jr. (WES) (Colombia) Peláez (SPK)	(United States) Matt Glaeser (MAD)	
**22**	(Philippines) Schipmann (CHA)	(Cameroon) Ngah (CLT) (United States) Rasheed (TRM) (England) Skelton (KNX)	(England) Baker (TEX) (Spain) **Bakero** (CLT) (Denmark) Gøling (KNX) (United States) Prpa (NAP) (Spain) Vinyals (SPK)	(Colombia) Moreno (CLT ) (Spain) Robles (GVL)	(Trinidad and Tobago) D. Smith (AVA) (Spain) **Fernández** (KNX) (Senegal) Ndiaye (CLT) (Spain) Torrellas (NAP) (Brazil) Ualefi (CHA) (Honduras) Obregón Jr. (WES) (Colombia) Peláez (SPK)	(United States) Matt Glaeser (MAD)	
**23**	(United States) Morse (POR)	(Spain) D. García (SPK) (Israel) Chilaka (MAD) (United States) Jauregui (CLT)	(Jamaica) **Marsh** (GVL) (Spain) Vinyals (SPK) (Germany) Schneider (OMA) (United States) O. Hernandez (CHA)	(England) Tunbridge (TRM) (United States) Chaney (CLT) (United States) Gebhard (MAD)	(Mexico) Merancio (SPK) (United States) Dengler (NAP) (Puerto Rico) Quiñones (POR) (England) McCormick (TEX) (Spain) Bakero (CLT) (Honduras) Obregón Jr. (WES) (Israel) Bazini (TRM)	(United States) Matt Poland (NAP)	
**24**	(United States) **J. Smith** (CHA)	(Ghana) Ayimbila (CHA) (United States) C. Garcia (GVL) (Republic of Ireland) Watters (CHA)	(Brazil) Cabral (TRM) (Honduras) Espinal (RIC) (Germany) Seufert (RIC) (England) Tunbridge (TRM)	(United States) Chaney (CLT) (Senegal) Diene (KNX) (Ghana) Mensah (GVL)	(United States) Delgado (NAP) (Canada) Çela (RIC) (Austria) Crull (MAD) (Senegal) Ciss (CLT) (Haiti) Desdunes (AVA) (United States) Ostrem (OMA) (Barbados) Reid-Stephen (TRM)	(United States) Ian Fuller (KNX)	
**25**	(United States) Sneddon (RIC)	(United States) Bubb (GVL) (United States) Ostrem (OMA) (United States) S. Ramos (AVA) (England) Skelton (KNX)	(United States) **Becher** (OMA) (Denmark) Gøling (KNX) (United States) Spengler (TEX)	(United States) Bronnik (OMA) (Cape Verde) Varela (POR) (England) Wright (POR)	(United States) J. Garcia (TEX) (United States) Lage (RIC) (England) Messer (POR) (United States) I. Martinez (OMA) (Ghana) Kasim (OMA) (England) Smith (KNX) (United States) Washington (POR)	(Colombia) Vincenzo Candela (OMA)	
**26**	(United States) Pack (TRM)	(Spain) Fernández (KNX) (United States) Vinberg (POR) (United States) Rasheed (TRM) (Spain) Viader (MAD)	(England) **Wright** (POR) (Republic of Ireland) O'Connor (NAP) (Trinidad and Tobago) Poon-Angeron (POR)	(United States) Henderlong (NAP) (Brazil) Dourado (MAD) (Barbados) Reid-Stephen (TRM)	(Mexico) Avilez (AVA) (Tanzania) Kasanzu (TRM) (United States) S. Ramos (AVA) (Japan) Masashi (POR) (United States) Calixtro (KNX) (Sierra Leone) Kamara (POR) (Honduras) Obregón Jr. (WES)	(United States) Ian Fuller (KNX)	
**27**	(United States) Sneddon (RIC)	(United States) Lopez (POR) (Nigeria) Opara (SPK) (Colombia) Pajaro (AVA) (United States) Pierre (WES)	(Puerto Rico) Angking (MAD) (United States) **Blancas** (AVA) (Sierra Leone) Kamara (POR) (United States) I. Martinez (Omaha) (Germany) Schneider (OMA)	(Ghana) Mensah (GVL)	(Ghana) Nuhu (OMA) (Spain) Fernández (KNX) (United States) C. Evans (GVL) (United States) Gebhard (MAD) (Spain) Robles (GVL) (United States) Henderlong (NAP) (Argentina) Vivas (TRM)	(Colombia) Vincenzo Candela (OMA)	
**28**	(Philippines) Schipmann (CHA)	(United States) Jalen Crisler (SPK) (United States) C. Evans (GVL) (England) Messer (POR) (United States) Rasheed (TRM)	(Denmark) Gøling (KNX) (United States) Spengler (TEX)	(Jamaica) **Brett** (SPK) (Haiti) Desdunes (AVA) (United States) Gil (SPK) (United States) McManus (TEX)	(United States) J. Garcia (TEX) (Jamaica) Green (POR) (United States) Ritchie (KNX) (Jamaica) Lewis (SPK) (Senegal) Ndiaye (CLT) (Philippines) Mariona (AVA) (Honduras) Obregón Jr. (WES)	(United States) Matt Poland (NAP)	
**29**	(Jamaica) Knight (CLT)	(Spain) Lelin (CHA) (Ghana) Tetteh (WES) (United States) Dimick (CLT)	(Japan) Masashi (POR) (Barbados) Reid-Stephen (TRM) (Spain) **Navarro** (OMA) (Spain) Bakero (CLT)	(Ghana) Mensah (GVL) (United States) Chaney (CLT) (Israel) Bazini (TRM)	(United States) Rankenburg (GVL) (United States) Ostrem (OMA) (Dominica) Jnohope (CLT) (United States) Herrera (GVL) (Senegal) Ndiaye (CLT) (Senegal) Diene (KNX) (England) Wright (POR)	(Scotland) Mark McKeever (TRM)	
**30**	(United States) Jensen (OMA)	(Jamaica) J. Brown (KNX) (United States) Cisneros (NAP) (United States) Miller (SPK)	(Venezuela) Caputo (KNX) (Honduras) Espinal (RIC) (United States) Herrera (GVL) (Republic of Ireland) O'Connor (NAP) (England) Wright (POR)	(United States) Gebhard (MAD) (Barbados) **Reid-Stephen** (TRM)	(United States) Delgado (NAP) (Norway) Haugli (KNX) (England) Messer (POR) (United States) C. Doyle (TRM) (Uganda) Onen (NAP) (Israel) Bazini (TRM) (Spain) Navarro (OMA)	(Colombia) Vincenzo Candela (OMA)	
**31**	(Mexico) **Merancio** (SPK)	(Jamaica) J. Brown (KNX) (Norway) Haugli (KNX) (United States) Ostrem (OMA) (Chile) Schenfeld (RIC)	(United States) C. Doyle (TRM) (United States) I. Martinez (OMA) (Barbados) Reid-Stephen (TRM)	(Senegal) Diene (KNX) (United States) Gebhard (MAD) (Brazil) Pinho (OMA)	(Ghana) Nuhu (OMA) (Germany) Billhardt (RIC) (Republic of Ireland) M. Doyle (KNX) (Netherlands) Guezen (WES) (Grenada) John-Brown (SPK) (United States) Reedy (SPK) (United States) Spengler (TEX)	(Colombia) Vincenzo Candela (OMA)	
**32**	(Ghana) Nuhu (OMA)	(Austria) Crull (MAD) (United States) Fricke (GVL) (United States) Ostrem (OMA)	(England) Baker (TEX) (Spain) Bakero (CLT) (Liberia) Johnson (WES) (Germany) Tekiela (KNX)	(United States) **Chaney** (CLT) (Senegal) Diene (KNX) (United States) Gil (SPK)	(United States) J. Garcia (TEX) (United States) Jordan(TEX) (Ghana) Owusu (OMA) (Venezuela) Caputo (KNX) (Trinidad and Tobago) Poon-Angeron (POR) (United States) Gebhard (MAD) (Honduras) Obregón Jr. (WES)	(United States) Matt Glaeser (MAD)	
**33**	(United States) Lewis (KNX)	(United States) Ostrem (OMA) (United States) Pierre (WES) (United States) Rasheed (TRM)	(Israel) Bazini (TRM) (Germany) Schneider (OMA) (Germany) Tekiela (KNX) (England) Wright (POR)	(Honduras) **Obregón Jr.** (WES) (Spain) Navarro (OMA) (Argentina) Vivas (TRM)	(Guatemala) Jérez (CHA) (United States) Cruz (AVA) (England) Baker (TEX) (United States) Blancas (AVA) (United States) Villalobos (AVA) (United States) Gil (SPK) (Argentina) Lombardi (CHA)	(Colombia) Vincenzo Candela (OMA)	
**34**	(United States) Pack (TRM)	(England) Messer (POR) (United States) Lage (RIC) (United States) **Fitch** (RIC)	(United States) Blancas (AVA) (England) Wright (POR) (Germany) Seufert (RIC) (Spain) Torrellas (NAP)	(Germany) Billhardt (RIC) (United States) Henderlong (NAP) (Sierra Leone) Kamara (POR)	(Chile) Jara (RIC) (Tanzania) Kasanzu (TRM) (Nicaragua) Glasser (NAP) (United States) Rosamilia (KNX) (Trinidad and Tobago) James (POR) (Israel) Bazini (TRM) (Argentina) Terzaghi (RIC)	(United States) Darren Sawatzky (RIC)	
**Bold** denotes Player of the Week

== See also ==
- USL League One
