= Ashkanov Apollon =

Haitian footballer (born 1991)

Personal information
- Full name: Ashkanov Apollon
- Date of birth: 3 April 1991 (age 35)
- Place of birth: Boston, Massachusetts, United States
- Height: 1.82 m (6 ft 0 in)
- Positions: Full back; winger

College career
Years	Team	Apps	(Gls)
2013	Peninsula Pirates		

Senior career*
Years	Team	Apps	(Gls)
2014	Looktabfah	13	(9)
2015	Kitsap Pumas	7	(4)
2016	Seattle Sounders FC U-23	3	(1)
2016	Samut Sakhon	9	(6)
2017	Long An	11	(3)
2018	Voltigeurs de Châteaubriant	14	(5)
2018–2019	FC Mulhouse	8	(0)
2019	SR Colmar		
2020	Sacramento Republic	12	(0)
2021	San Diego 1904	6	(1)
2021–2023	Hartford Athletic	41	(1)
2024	Central Valley Fuego	21	(0)
2025	AV Alta	6	(0)

International career^{‡}
2021–	Haiti	7	(1)
- * Club domestic league appearances and goals as of 12:59, 1 November 2025 (UTC) ‡ National team caps and goals as of 18:13, 26 March 2023 (UTC)

Ashkanov "Ash" Apollon (born 3 April 1991) is a professional footballer who plays as a winger or fullback. He is currently a free agent after playing for AV Alta in USL League One. Born in the United States, he plays for the Haiti national team.

== Club career ==
Ashkanov started playing soccer near the age of 17. Shortly after moving back to the United States, Apollon was recruited by Peninsula College, where he played one year under coach Andrew Chapman. That season, he scored 16 goals while leading the NWAACC in assists with 15, helping his team with a championship run in 2013.

In 2014, Apollon signed for Thailand AIS D2 side Looktabfah F.C. during the second half of their season, where he began his professional career. In 2015, he decided to return to the United States where he signed for PDL side Kitsap Pumas. In 2016, the forward joined the Seattle Sounder U-23 side for the short PDL season. After a year, he decided to move back to Thailand in July where he ended up signing for AIS D2 side Samut Sakhon FC. He helped them to the AIS Champions League and a place in the new Championship division in Thailand's 2017 league system. On 19 December 2016 Ashkanov Apollon signed a 1-year deal with Vietnam's V-League.1 side Long An.

In May 2021, Apollon joined National Independent Soccer Association side San Diego 1904 FC.

On 25 September 2021, Apollon joined USL Championship side Hartford Athletic.

Apollon signed with USL League One side Central Valley Fuego on 27 February 2024. Central Valley Fuego left the USL following the 2024 USL League One season.

Apollo remained in League One by joining expansion side AV Alta in January 2025.

== International career ==
Born in the United States, Apollon is of Haitian descent through his parents. He debuted internationally with the Haitian national team in a 2–0 2022 FIFA World Cup qualification win over Belize on 25 March 2021.
