= Alexis Cerritos =

Salvadoran footballer (born 2000)

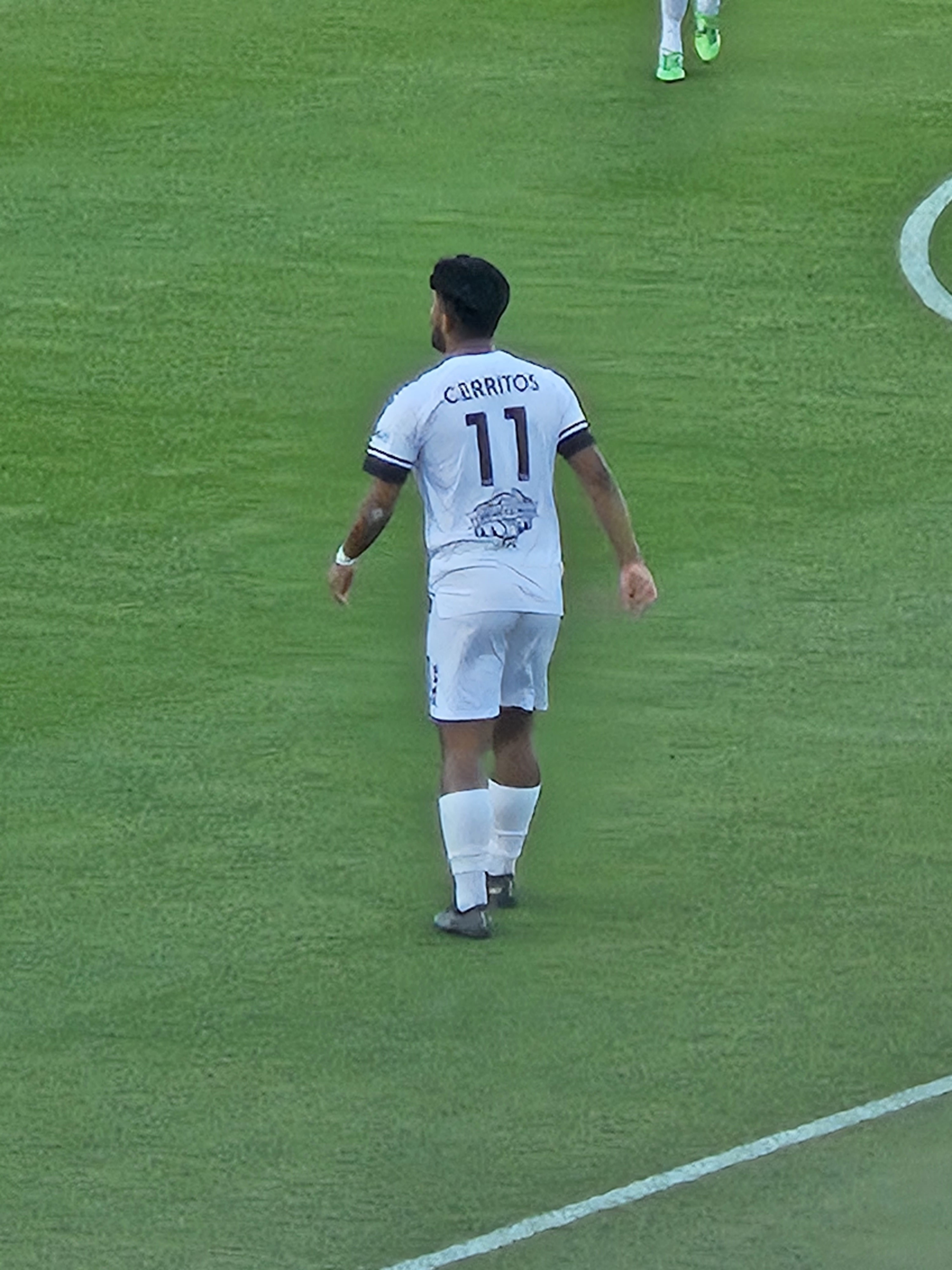
- Cerritos in action with Central Valley Fuego

Personal information
- Full name: Ronald Alexis Cerritos Castañeda
- Date of birth: 2 October 2000 (age 26)
- Place of birth: Santa Clarita, California, U.S.
- Height: 5 ft 11 in (1.80 m)
- Position: Winger

Team information
- Current team: Corpus Christi
- Number: 11

Youth career
- 2015–2018: D.C. United
- 2019: Pachuca

Senior career*
Years	Team	Apps	(Gls)
2019	Loudoun United	1	(0)
2020	AD Oliveirense	2	(0)
2020	Orange County SC	3	(0)
2021	Rio Grande Valley FC	22	(1)
2022–2023	Central Valley Fuego	50	(10)
2024	Huntsville City	4	(0)
2024	Lexington SC	16	(3)
2025	AV Alta	19	(6)
2026–	Corpus Christi	20	(1)

International career^{‡}
2016–2017	El Salvador U17	7	(3)
2018	El Salvador U20	6	(0)
2017–	El Salvador	2	(0)
- * Club domestic league appearances and goals as of 31 October 2026 ‡ National team caps and goals as of 19 January 2020

Ronald Alexis Cerritos Castañeda (born 2 October 2000), better known as Alexis Cerritos, is a professional footballer who plays as a winger for Corpus Christi in USL League One. Born in the United States, he plays for the El Salvador national team.

== Professional ==
Loudoun United acquired Cerritos for the remainder of Loudoun's 2019 season.

After a short stint in Portugal with AD Oliveirense, Cerritos returned to the United States, joining USL Championship side Orange County SC on September 12, 2020.

Following his release from Orange County at the end of the 2020 season, Cerritos moved to USL Championship side Rio Grande Valley FC on April 7, 2021.

Cerritos signed with MLS Next Pro club Huntsville City FC on 29 January 2024.

In January 2026, Cerritos joined USL League One club Corpus Christi ahead of the club's first professional season.

== International ==
Cerritos was called up to the El Salvador national under-17 football team for the 2017 CONCACAF U-17 Championship. He played in all the matches El Salvador played in the tournament, and scored their only goal in the tournament.

Cerritos debuted for the El Salvador national football team in a friendly 1–0 win over Canada. At 17 years old and 6 days, Cerritos became the second youngest player to debut for El Salvador, and the first player born in the 21st century.

== Personal life ==
Cerritos was born in Santa Clarita, California, and was raised in Bowie, Maryland, United States.

Cerritos' father, Ronald Cerritos, was also a professional footballer who played for the El Salvador national football team.
