= Sebastian Cruz =

American soccer player (born 2000)

Personal information
- Full name: Sebastian Cruz
- Date of birth: July 31, 2000 (age 26)
- Place of birth: Fresno, California, United States
- Height: 1.68 m (5 ft 6 in)
- Position: Midfielder

Team information
- Current team: Tampa Bay Rowdies
- Number: 30

Youth career
- 2013–2016: De Anza Force
- 2016–2018: Sporting Kansas City

College career
Years	Team	Apps	(Gls)
2019–2022	Cal State Fullerton Titans	56	(17)

Senior career*
Years	Team	Apps	(Gls)
2018	Sporting Kansas City II	7	(0)
2023–2024	Sporting Kansas City II	41	(9)
2023	Sporting Kansas City	0	(0)
2025	AV Alta FC	28	(1)
2026–	Tampa Bay Rowdies	24	(4)
- * Club domestic league appearances and goals as of 17:59, 8 November 2026 (UTC)

Sebastian Cruz (born July 31, 2000) is an American professional soccer player who currently plays for USL Championship club Tampa Bay Rowdies.

== Career ==
Cruz played with United Soccer League side Swope Park Rangers during their 2018 season from Sporting Kansas City's academy. He made his first professional appearance on March 24, 2018, as an injury-time substitute during a 4–2 win over Seattle Sounders FC 2.

After playing seven regular season games and two playoff games with Swope Park in 2018, Cruz attended Cal State Fullerton, having maintained amateur status. At Fullerton, he played on the men's soccer team for three seasons. Cruz then signed a professional contract with his old club (since rebranded as Sporting Kansas City II and playing in MLS Next Pro for the 2023 season.

On February 26, 2025, Cruz signed with USL League One side AV Alta FC ahead of their inaugural season.

On 12 December 2025, Cruz signed for Tampa Bay Rowdies in the USL Championship.
