= Harrison Robledo =

American soccer player

Personal information
- Date of birth: February 2, 2002 (age 24)
- Place of birth: Queens, New York, United States
- Height: 5 ft 7 in (1.70 m)
- Position: Midfielder

Youth career
- 2016–2020: New York City
- 2020–2022: FC Cincinnati

Senior career*
Years	Team	Apps	(Gls)
2022–2023	FC Cincinnati	2	(0)
2022	FC Cincinnati 2	17	(1)
2023	→ Indy Eleven (loan)	30	(1)
2025	AV Alta	23	(2)
- * Club domestic league appearances and goals as of October 31, 2025

Harrison Robledo (born February 2, 2002) is an American professional soccer player who plays as a midfielder.

== Youth career ==
Robledo spent four years in the New York City FC academy, helping the team win the 2016 Generation Adidas cup with the club's U-16 team and played with the U-18/19 Development National Championship team. He moved to the FC Cincinnati academy in 2020 and traveled with the FC Cincinnati squad during their 2022 preseason camp.

== Professional career ==
On February 25, 2022, FC Cincinnati sent New York City FC $50,000 of General Allocation Money to acquire Robledo's MLS rights, and signed him to a homegrown player contract with the club the day before the start of the 2022 season. He made his professional debut on February 26, 2022, appearing as a 61st-minute substitute during a 5–0 loss against Austin FC. In January 2023, Robledo joined Indy Eleven for a one-year loan. He made his debut on March 11, 2023, against Tampa Bay Rowdies after being subbed in the 84th minute. Robledo scored his first goal for Indy Eleven on April 5, 2023, against Michigan Stars FC in the 2023 U.S. Open Cup. Robledo was released by Cincinnati following their 2023 season.

On January 24, 2025, Robledo signed with USL League One side AV Alta ahead of their inaugural season.

== Personal life ==
Born in the United States, Robledo is of Colombian descent and holds dual citizenship.
