= Miguel Ibarra =

American soccer player (born 1990)

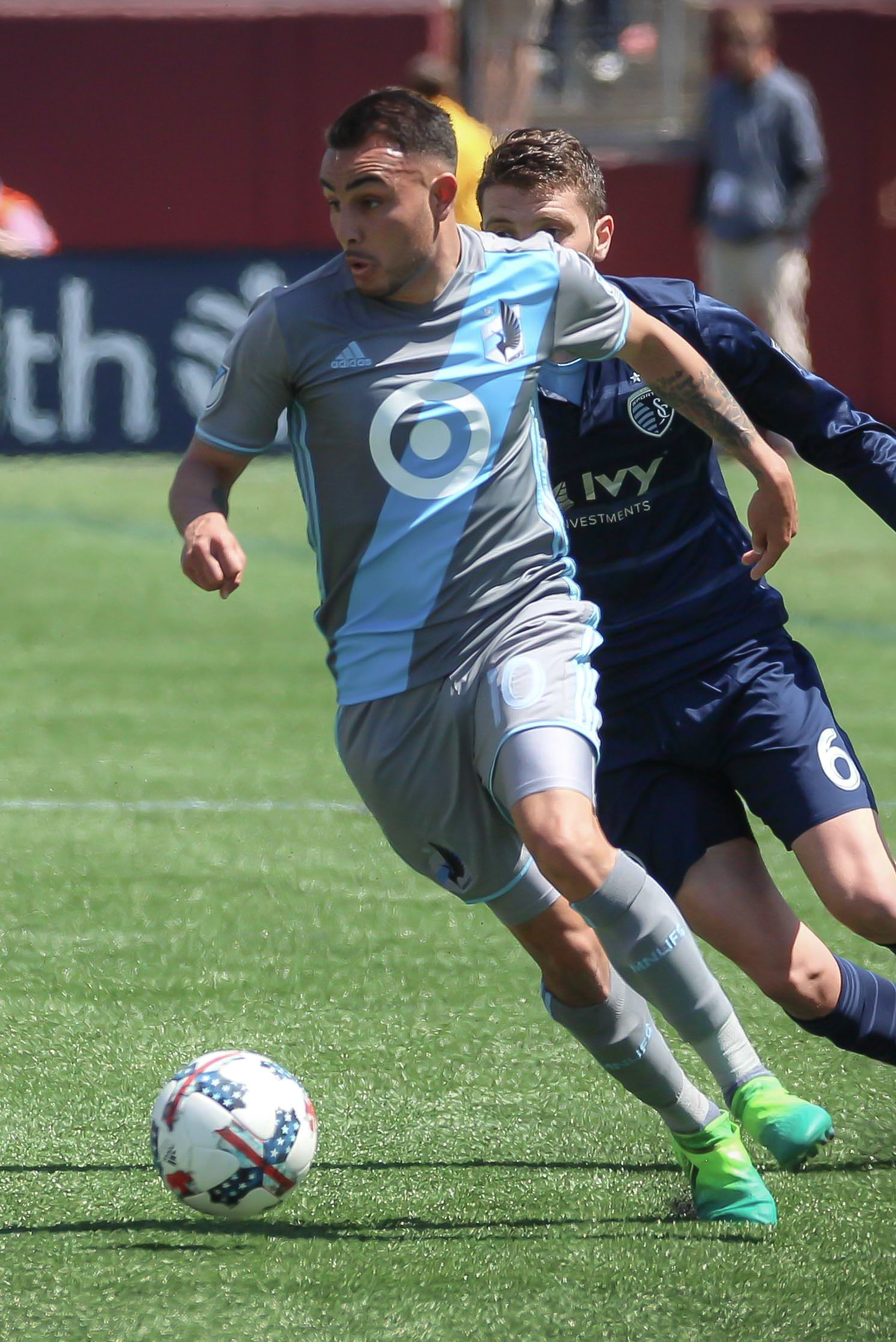
- Ibarra with Minnesota United FC in 2017

Personal information
- Full name: Miguel Ángel Ibarra Andrade
- Date of birth: March 15, 1990 (age 36)
- Place of birth: Lancaster, California, United States
- Height: 5 ft 7 in (1.70 m)
- Positions: Attacking midfielder; winger

Team information
- Current team: AV Alta
- Number: 10

Youth career
- 2004–2007: Ambush Soccer Club

College career
Years	Team	Apps	(Gls)
2008–2009	Taft Cougars		
2010–2011	UC Irvine Anteaters		

Senior career*
Years	Team	Apps	(Gls)
2008–2010	Lancaster Rattlers	43	(12)
2011	Orange County Blue Star	4	(0)
2012–2015	Minnesota United	90	(17)
2015–2016	León	8	(1)
2017–2019	Minnesota United	84	(11)
2020	Seattle Sounders	12	(0)
2021	San Diego Loyal	28	(2)
2022–2024	Charlotte Independence	65	(5)
2025–	AV Alta	31	(1)

International career^{‡}
2014–2015	United States	3	(0)
- * Club domestic league appearances and goals as of October 28, 2026 ‡ National team caps and goals as of October 16, 2022

Miguel Ángel Ibarra Andrade (born March 15, 1990) is an American professional soccer player who plays for AV Alta FC in USL League One.

== College and amateur ==
Ibarra played college soccer at Taft College from 2008 to 2009, and then at UC Irvine from 2010 to 2011. During his time at Taft, Ibarra was named as Central Valley Conference MVP and at Irvine was named as Named Big West Co-Offensive Player of the Year and All-Big West First Team in 2011.

During his time at college, Ibarra played with USL Premier Development League club Lancaster Rattlers between 2008 and 2010, and later with Orange County Blue Star in 2011.

== Professional career ==
Ibarra was selected in the second round of the 2012 MLS Supplemental Draft (27th overall) by Portland Timbers, but was not signed by the club.

=== Minnesota United FC ===
Ibarra signed with NASL club Minnesota United FC on March 13, 2012. He made his professional debut on April 8, 2012, in a 0–0 draw against Carolina RailHawks. He was named to the NASL Best XI in 2013 and 2014. He was named NASL Player of the Month for September 2014 and was awarded the 2014 Golden Ball as the league's best player at the conclusion of the season.

=== Club León ===
Ibarra signed with Club León on June 10, 2015, for a fee reported to be near $1 million.

=== Return to Minnesota ===
Ibarra returned to Minnesota in January 2017 for their inaugural season in MLS. The Portland Timbers previously owned his MLS rights but sent them to Minnesota United as part of a trade for goalkeeper Jeff Attinella. His option was declined at the end of the 2019 season, releasing him from the club.

=== Seattle Sounders FC ===
On February 20, 2020, Ibarra signed with Seattle Sounders FC.

=== San Diego Loyal ===
On May 28, 2021, Ibarra joined USL Championship club San Diego Loyal SC for the 2021 season. Ibarra scored his first goal for San Diego on June 29, 2021, the winner in a 1–0 victory over Oakland Roots SC.

=== Charlotte Independence ===
On March 30, 2022, Ibarra signed with USL League One club Charlotte Independence. Ibarra scored his first goal for Charlotte on April 16, 2022, in a 2–1 win over Northern Colorado Hailstorm FC.

=== AV Alta FC ===
On December 9, 2024, Ibarra became the first player for USL League One expansion team AV Alta FC in Lancaster, California. He signed a two-year contract to play for the team in his hometown.

== International career ==
Ibarra was called up to United States national team for an October 2014 friendly against Ecuador, becoming the first American second division player called up to the national team since 2005. He earned his first cap against Honduras on October 14, 2014.

Ibarra received a second call up to the national team for the final two games of the 2014 campaign but did not see playing time in either game. His first start came on February 8, 2015, in a USMNT friendly against Panama.

== Personal life ==
Ibarra was born in the United States to Mexican parents.

Ibarra was teammates with former Minnesota Stars player Amani Walker while at UC Irvine. While at Minnesota they were roommates and carpooled to practice together.

During the 2014 season, Ibarra was joined in Minnesota by former Orange County Blue Star teammate Christian Ramirez. The two became roommates and formed a fruitful partnership on the field. Ibarra was nicknamed "Batman" and Ramirez "Superman" by the fans.

== Career statistics ==
As of October 10, 2017

Appearances and goals by club, season and competition
Club	Season	League			National cup		League cup		Other		Total	
Club	Season	Division	Apps	Goals	Apps	Goals	Apps	Goals	Apps	Goals	Apps	Goals
Lancaster Rattlers	2008	USL PDL	11	2	0	0	—		—		11	2
Lancaster Rattlers	2009	USL PDL	16	4	0	0	—		—		16	4
Lancaster Rattlers	2010	USL PDL	16	6	0	0	—		—		16	6
Lancaster Rattlers	Total		43	12	0	0	0	0	0	0	43	12
Orange County Blue Star	2011	USL PDL	4	0	0	0	—		—		4	0
Minnesota United FC	2012	NASL	23	3	2	1	5	1	—		30	5
Minnesota United FC	2013	NASL	26	1	0	0	—		—		26	1
Minnesota United FC	2014	NASL	26	8	0	0	1	1	—		27	9
Minnesota United FC	2015	NASL	8	2	1	1	0	0	—		9	3
Minnesota United FC	Total		83	14	3	2	6	2	0	0	92	18
León	2015–16	Liga MX	8	1	11	3	0	0	0	0	19	4
León	2016–17	Liga MX	0	0	1	0	0	0	0	0	1	0
León	Total		8	1	12	3	0	0	0	0	20	4
Minnesota United FC	2017	MLS	28	3	0	0	0	0	0	0	28	3
Career total			166	30	15	5	6	2	0	0	187	37

== Honors ==
Individual

- NASL Golden Ball: 2014
- NASL Best XI: 2014
- NASL Player of the Month – September 2014
- NASL Best XI: 2013
