= Carlos Avilez =

Mexican footballer (born 1999)

Personal information
- Full name: Carlos Daniel Avilez Mojica
- Date of birth: January 9, 1999 (age 27)
- Place of birth: Dallas, Texas, United States
- Height: 1.83 m (6 ft 0 in)
- Position: Goalkeeper

Youth career
- 2012–2018: FC Dallas

Senior career*
Years	Team	Apps	(Gls)
2017	→ OKC Energy FC (loan)	0	(0)
2019–2020	North Texas SC	32	(0)
2020	FC Dallas	0	(0)
2021	South Georgia Tormenta	2	(0)
2022–2023	Chattanooga Red Wolves	52	(0)
2024	Central Valley Fuego	16	(0)
2025	AV Alta FC	20	(0)

International career
2014	United States U15	2	(0)
2015	United States U16	2	(0)
2017	Mexico U18	1	(0)
- * Club domestic league appearances and goals as of October 31, 2025

Carlos Daniel Avilez Mojica (born January 9, 1999) is a professional footballer who most recently played as a goalkeeper for AV Alta FC in USL League One. Born in the United States, he represented the Mexico national under-18 team.

== Club career ==
On February 26, 2021, Avilez joined USL League One side South Georgia Tormenta FC.

Avilez signed with Chattanooga Red Wolves SC on January 17, 2022.

On February 22, 2024, Avilez moved to USL League One side Central Valley Fuego.

== Honors ==
North Texas SC

- USL League One Regular Season Title: 2019
- USL League One Championship: 2019
