= The Hangar (Lancaster, California) =

Stadium in Lancaster, California

Lancaster Municipal Stadium
- The Hangar

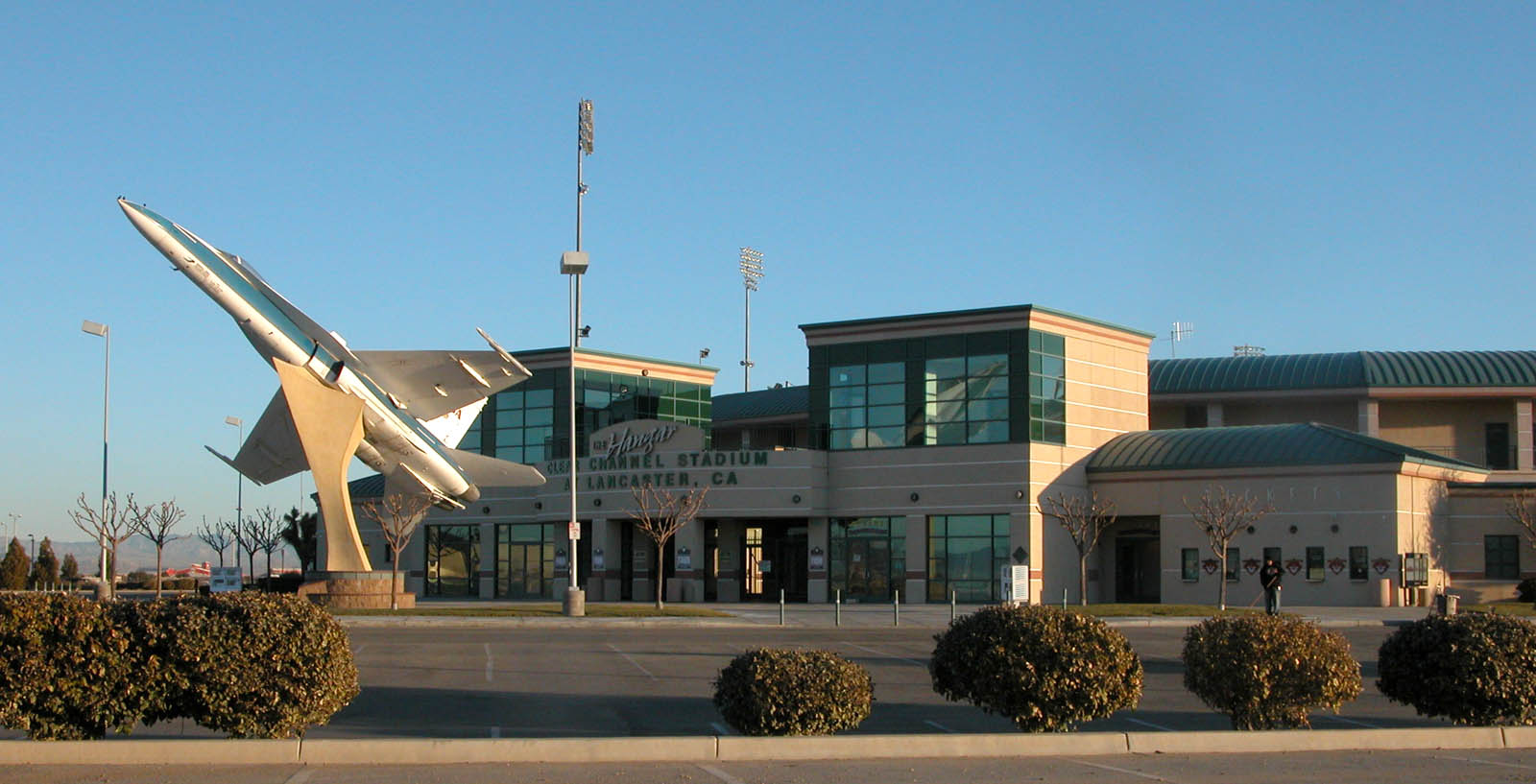

- Location within California Location within the United States
- Interactive map of Lancaster Municipal Stadium
- Former names: Lancaster Municipal Stadium (1996–2004); Clear Channel Stadium (2005–2012)
- Address: 45116 Valley Central Way; Lancaster, CA 93536
- Coordinates: 34°42′10″N 118°10′23″W
- Owner: City of Lancaster
- Capacity: 5,300

Construction
- Groundbreaking: September 6, 1995
- Opened: April 16, 1996
- Renovated: 2024–2025
- Cost: $14.5 million ($29.8 million in 2025 dollars)
- Architect: Populous
- General contractor: Pinner Construction Company

Tenants
- Lancaster JetHawks (CL) 1996–2020; Lancaster Sound Breakers (PL) 2023; AV Alta FC (USL1) 2025–present

The Hangar, officially known as Lancaster Municipal Stadium and formerly known as Clear Channel Stadium, is a stadium in Lancaster, California, United States. Previously a ballpark, the Hanger has been reconfigured into a soccer-specific stadium and has been the home of third-division USL League One club AV Alta FC since their first season in 2025. The Hangar is located near State Route 14 west of downtown Lancaster.

From its opening in 1996 to 2020, the stadium was the home field of the Lancaster JetHawks, a now-defunct minor league baseball team of the Advanced A California League. In 2005, Clear Channel Communications entered into a 10-year, $770,000 naming rights deal with the JetHawks and the City of Lancaster, who divided the revenue between them. The deal was planned to run through the 2014 season, but Clear Channel Stadium signage was removed in 2012. The stadium was then renamed The Hangar, its nickname since the stadium opened in 1996, as well as Lancaster Municipal Stadium. Following the disbandment of the Jethawks, the Lancaster Sound Breakers of the Pecos League played their 2023 season at the Hangar, before folding after their inaugural season.

== Features ==
Because of the area's aerospace legacy, the stadium has a NASA F/A-18 Hornet mounted on display at the front entrance. The $14.5 million facility offers luxury skyboxes, a video message board, and an old-fashioned manual scoreboard. The stadium's seating capacity is listed at 6,860, but can accommodate over 7,000 fans and features slightly over 4,500 permanent full chair stadium seats. Two grass berm general admission areas are available when all seats are sold out.

The stadium has also been used to accommodate special events such as local high school graduations, charity softball games, concerts, and the Field of Drafts (an annual brew festival by the City of Lancaster since 2013). Before the Lancaster JetHawks started each new season in April, they played an exhibition game against the local Antelope Valley College Marauders baseball team. However, for the last three JetHawks seasons, they played their exhibition games against the local University of Antelope Valley Pioneers baseball team.

=== Conversion to a soccer-specific stadium ===
In 2024, the Lancaster City Council approved expenditure of over $17 million to convert the Lancaster Municipal Stadium into a 5,300-seat soccer-specific stadium.

The renovations include the addition of a 1,000-seat modular grandstand on the east side, and a 500-seat safe-standing supporters' section with a canopy, which is occupied by supporters groups such as "The 661" (a reference to the phone area code of the Lancaster area). Other major renovations have been done to the field dimensions, existing seating, and stadium infrastructure such as LED lighting and a 16-foot wind wall. The west and south grandstands from the existing baseball configuration have been rebuilt to align with the soccer field and improve sight lines for the rest of the existing seating.
