= Jimmie Villalobos =

American soccer player (born 1995)

Personal information
- Date of birth: July 21, 1995 (age 31)
- Place of birth: Bakersfield, California, United States
- Height: 1.76 m (5 ft 9 in)
- Position: Attacking midfielder

Team information
- Current team: AV Alta FC
- Number: 21

College career
Years	Team	Apps	(Gls)
2014	College of the Desert Roadrunners	19	(16)
2017–2019	Cal Poly Pomona Broncos	67	(35)

Senior career*
Years	Team	Apps	(Gls)
2017–2019	FC Golden State Force	12	(4)
2020	Los Angeles Force	8	(1)
2021–2022	Chattanooga Red Wolves	54	(6)
2023–2024	One Knoxville	32	(3)
2024	→ Forward Madison (loan)	21	(1)
2025–	AV Alta	57	(6)
- * Club domestic league appearances and goals as of October 28, 2026

Jimmie Villalobos (born July 21, 1995) is an American professional soccer player who currently plays for AV Alta FC in USL League One.

== Career ==
=== College and amateur ===
Villalbos originally planned to attend California Baptist University on a scholarship, but didn't achieve the required grades. Villalobos instead attended College of the Desert in 2014 to obtain his associate degree, playing a single season of college soccer with the Roadrunners, scoring 16 goals and tallying 6 assists in 19 appearances. Villalobos returned to college soccer in 2017, transferring to California State Polytechnic University, Pomona, going on to make 67 appearances, scoring 35 goals and tallying 11 assists. During his time with the Broncos, Villalobos earned numerous accolades, including United Soccer Coaches All-America First Team, D2CCA All-America First Team, D2CCA West Region Player of the Year, United Soccer Coaches All-West Region First Team, D2CCA All-West Region First Team, CCAA Offensive Player of the Year, All-CCAA First Team on three consecutive occasions, CCAA All-Tournament Team in 2018 and 2019, and D2CCA All-West Region Second Team in both 2017 and 2018.

Whilst at college, Villalobos played in the USL League Two with FC Golden State Force between 2017 and 2019.

=== Professional ===
In 2020, Villalobos signed with NISA side Los Angeles Force, making 6 regular season appearances and appearing in 1 post-season game during a season affected by the COVID-19 pandemic.

On December 4, 2020, Villalobos joined USL League One side Chattanooga Red Wolves ahead of their 2021 season. He made his debut on May 8, 2021, starting and scoring the game-winning goal in a 1–0 win over North Texas SC.

Villalobos was a core member of Red Wolves SC's 2022 squad which qualified for the playoffs and lost in the final to South Georgia Tormenta FC. He finished the year with 32 games played, four goals and two assists.

On January 3, 2023, Villalobos signed with One Knoxville SC. On January 24, 2024, Forward Madison FC announced that Villalobos would join the club on a season-long loan from Knoxville.
