= Sivert Haugli =

Norwegian footballer (born 1999)

Personal information
- Full name: Sivert August Felde Haugli
- Date of birth: 5 May 1999 (age 27)
- Place of birth: Oslo, Norway
- Height: 1.96 m (6 ft 5 in)
- Position: Defender

Youth career
- –2014: Snarøya SK
- 2014–2016: Stabæk
- 2016–2017: Bærum

College career
Years	Team	Apps	(Gls)
2018–2021	Virginia Tech Hokies	72	(4)

Senior career*
Years	Team	Apps	(Gls)
2017–2018	Bærum	17	(1)
2021	Des Moines Menace	7	(2)
2022	Portland Timbers 2	6	(0)
2022	→ Phoenix Rising (loan)	9	(0)
2023	Moss	19	(1)
2024–2025	One Knoxville	50	(2)
- * Club domestic league appearances and goals as of October 31, 2025

Sivert August Felde Haugli (born 5 May 1999) is a Norwegian professional footballer who plays as a defender.

== Career ==
=== Youth and college ===
Haugli played as part of the youth academy at Snarøya SK, before a spell at Stabæk. In 2016, Haugli joined Bærum and went on to appear for the club's first team in both 2017 and 2018.

In 2018, Haugli moved to the United States to play college soccer at Virginia Tech. In four seasons with the Hokies, Haugli went on to make 71 appearances, scoring four goals and adding three assists. In 2020 he was named to the Academic Honor-Roll.

During his 2021 season at college, Haugli also appeared for USL League Two side Des Moines Menace, scoring two goals in seven regular season games, as well as adding a further goal in two playoff appearances on the way to helping the Menace to the league title.

=== Professional ===
On 11 January 2022, Haugli was selected 83rd overall in the 2022 MLS SuperDraft by Portland Timbers. He joined Portland on their preseason tour, but went unsigned by the club.

On 26 April 2022, it was announced Haugli would sign with Portland's MLS Next Pro side Portland Timbers 2, but would spend the remainder of the season with USL Championship club Phoenix Rising. After making nine appearances for Phoenix, he was recalled by Portland on 9 August 2022. He went on to play in six games for Timbers 2 in the MLS Next Pro that season.

After a season in Norway with Moss, Haugli returned to the United States on 28 December 2023 to join USL League One side One Knoxville ahead of their 2024 season.

== Personal ==
Sivert's father, Frode Haugli, played as a defender for Norwegian side HamKam. His younger brother, Oskar, currently plays at Virginia Tech.

== Honours ==
=== Club ===
Des Moines Menace

- USL League Two: 2021
