= Javier Mariona =

Filipino footballer (born 2004)

Personal information
- Full name: Javier Alessandro Jacutin Mariona
- Date of birth: 17 October 2004 (age 22)
- Place of birth: Los Altos, California, U.S.
- Height: 1.68 m (5 ft 6 in)
- Positions: Attacking midfielder; forward

Team information
- Current team: Corpus Christi FC (on loan from AV Alta)
- Number: 30

Youth career
- MVLA Soccer Club
- Red Star Soccer Academy
- San Jose Earthquakes
- 2017–2018: De Anza Force
- 2018–2021: Silicon Valley Soccer Academy
- 2021–2023: De Anza Force

Senior career*
Years	Team	Apps	(Gls)
2021–2023	De Anza Force	0	(0)
2021–2022	→ Oakland Roots (loan)	2	(0)
2021–2022	→ Project 51O (loan)	16	(8)
2023–2024	Laredo Heat	0	(0)
2024	Des Moines Menace	0	(0)
2024	Central Valley Fuego	14	(3)
2025–	AV Alta	25	(2)
2026–	→ Corpus Christi FC (loan)	2	(0)

International career^{‡}
2022	El Salvador U20	8	(5)
2025–	Philippines U22	4	(0)
2025–	Philippines U23	8	(3)
2024–	Philippines	8	(0)
- * Club domestic league appearances and goals as of 28 October 2026 ‡ National team caps and goals as of 28 July 2026

Javier Alessandro Jacutin Mariona (born 17 October 2004) is a professional footballer who currently plays as an attacking midfielder or a forward for USL League One club Corpus Christi FC, on loan from club AV Alta FC. Born in the United States, he plays for the Philippines national team. Mariona he represents El Salvador at youth levels, before switching to play for the Philippines.

== Early and personal life ==
Mariona was born in Los Altos, California to a Salvadoran father, Rodrigo Mariona (son of Salvadoran football legend Salvador Mariona), and a Filipino mother, former tennis player Marisue Jacutin (daughter of Dicky and Suzette Jacutin). He has one sister, 5-star tennis recruit Bella Jacutin-Mariona.

As a child, he enjoyed food, watching extreme sports (he is a fan of Travis Pastrana), and playing football, tennis, taekwondo, skateboarding and golf. At age six, he played for a 7 to 8-year-old football team because of his "superior talent".

According to his mother, "Javier loves sinigang, nilagang baka, adobo, pancit and he’s a big rice fan! Javier completely understands Spanish and some Visayan, but answers back in English since it is the language commonly spoken at home." When asked what he would do if not a footballer, she said "Javier the Monster Truck Driver". At just twelve years old, he was already receiving offers from European clubs.

== Club career ==
Mariona was signed as a USL Academy player by Oakland Roots on 24 July 2021. He made his debut as a late substitute in a 3–1 win against Tacoma Defiance on 29 August.

He made his UPSL debut for Project 51O the next day, wearing the number 10 shirt and scoring the only goal for his side in a 1–1 draw against MCSC Jaguars. Mariona signed his first professional contract in January 2025, joining USL League One expansion side AV Alta FC.

== International career ==
Mariona is eligible to represent the United States through birth, El Salvador through his father. He holds Salvadoran citizenship.

He competed in the 2022 CONCACAF U-20 Championship with the El Salvador U20, helping them reach the round of 16. He also scored two goals in the team’s 4-1 group stage victory over Aruba.

On December 2024, Javier Mariona officially obtained Filipino citizenship.

In December 2024, he was named to the Philippines senior national team roster for the 2024 ASEAN Championship. He made his debut in the very first group stage match, a 1-1 draw against Myanmar, coming on as a substitute for Jarvey Gayoso in the 62nd minute. He also saw playing time in every subsequent tournament match with his team. Together with his teammates, he managed to advance all the way to the semifinals, where their run came to an end after a loss to Thailand in the second leg.

== Career statistics ==
=== International ===
As of match played 28 July 2026

Appearances and goals by national team and year
National team	Year	Apps	Goals
Philippines	2024	6	0
Philippines	2025	0	0
Philippines	2026	2	0
Total		8	0
