= Bachir Ndiaye =

Senegalese footballer (born 1999)

Personal information
- Full name: Mouhamadou Bachir Ndiaye
- Date of birth: 27 January 1999 (age 27)
- Place of birth: Dakar, Senegal
- Height: 1.91 m (6 ft 3 in)
- Position: Midfielder

Team information
- Current team: Miami FC
- Number: 12

Youth career
- Onslow Classic

College career
Years	Team	Apps	(Gls)
2019	Louisburg Hurricanes	17	(6)
2020–2022	UNC Wilmington Seahawks	36	(0)

Senior career*
Years	Team	Apps	(Gls)
2022	Asheville City	6	(1)
2023–2025	Charlotte Independence	61	(5)
2026–	Miami FC	29	(1)
- * Club domestic league appearances and goals as of November 7, 2026

Mouhamadou Bachir Ndiaye (born 27 January 1999) is a Senegalese professional footballer who plays as a midfielder for Miami FC in the USL Championship.

== Career ==
=== Youth, College & Amateur ===
Ndiaye was born in Dakar, Senegal. He moved with his family to Jacksonville, North Carolina in 2016, and he played high school soccer at Northside High School in Jacksonville, North Carolina, where he earned a 3A All-State distinction.

In 2019, Ndiaye attended Louisburg College to play college soccer. In his lone season with the Hurricanes, Ndiaye made 17 appearances, scoring six goals and tallying three assists, as well as earning a First-Team All-Conference selection. In 2020, Ndiaye transferred to the University of North Carolina Wilmington. He remained with the Seahawks for three seasons, and made 36 appearances. He was an All-Colonial Athletic Association First-Team selection and earned United Soccer Coaches All-Atlantic First Team notice.

While at UNC Wilmington, Ndiaye also appeared in the USL League Two with Asheville City during their 2022 season, where he made six appearances.

On 21 December 2022, Ndiaye was selected 47th overall in the 2023 MLS SuperDraft by Inter Miami CF.

=== Professional ===
On 10 March 2023, Ndiaye signed his first professional deal with USL League One side Charlotte Independence. He made his professional debut on 18 March 2023, appearing as a 74th-minute substitute during a 0–0 draw with Richmond Kickers.
