= AV Alta FC =

American professional soccer team

AV Alta
- Full name: AV Alta Football Club
- Founded: October 4, 2023; 3 years ago
- Stadium: Lancaster Municipal Stadium
- Capacity: 6,000
- Owner(s): J David Harden; John Smelzer; Bob Roback
- President: John Smelzer
- Head coach: Brian Kleiban
- League: USL League One
- 2025: USL League One, 9th of 14
- Website: avaltafc.com
Home colors	Away colors

AV Alta Football Club, commonly referred to as AV Alta FC, AV Alta, or Alta is an American professional soccer team based in Lancaster, California. First announced in 2023, the team plays in the USL League One since 2025. Their home field is Lancaster Municipal Stadium, also known as "The Hangar".

== History ==
On October 4, 2023, the United Soccer League announced that the city of Lancaster, California, had been awarded a USL League One expansion team which would start play in the 2025 season. John Smelzer, an entrepreneur who worked with the United States Soccer Federation for the 1994 FIFA World Cup, was announced as founder and president.

On May 16, 2024, Brian Kleiban was announced as the team's inaugural head coach. Kleiban had held coaching roles with FC Barcelona, Los Angeles FC and Chivas USA.

The club's name — AV Alta FC — and logo were unveiled on May 17, 2024. Former U.S. international and Major League Soccer player Miguel Ibarra, who hails from the area, was announced as the club's first player on December 9, 2024.

In their first match in club history, the club lost to the South Georgia Tormenta FC 2–0 away. However, in their inaugural match in both the U.S. Open Cup and at the Lancaster Municipal Stadium, AV Alta won 3–1 over the Ventura County Fusion, with Jerry Desdunes scoring the first goal in club history.

== Club identity, crest and colors ==
The club's official name, crest and colors were unveiled in front of thousands of fans in Lancaster on May 17, 2024. "AV" is a common local nickname for the Antelope Valley, while "Alta" is meant to allude to the region's location in the high desert, its ties to the aerospace industry, and to Alta California, the region's name prior to California statehood.

The club's official colors are referred to as Joshua Green and Desert Sand, the former in reference to the abundant Joshua trees in the area. The shape of the crest is meant to resemble a California poppy, while the angled font of the "AV" at the center of the crest was inspired by angular shape of the B2 stealth bomber.

=== Kit history ===
Home and away kits.

- Home

2025	2026–

- Away

2025–

- Third

2025

== Stadium ==
The team play at Lancaster Municipal Stadium, also known as "The Hangar", a former minor league ballpark that was home to the Lancaster JetHawks until 2020. The stadium was reconfigured for soccer use by adding seating in the former outfield at a cost of $17 million, and has a total of 5,300 seats, including a safe standing supporters' terrace on the north side.

== Players ==
=== Current roster ===
As of March 16, 2026

Note: Flags indicate national team as defined under FIFA eligibility rules; some limited exceptions apply. Players may hold more than one non-FIFA nationality.

No.	Pos.	Nation	Player
2	DF	USA	Christian Ortiz
3	DF	USA	Alfredo Ortiz
4	DF	COL	Miguel Parajo
5	MF	BEN	Maboumou Alassane
6	MF	PAN	Osvaldo Lay
7	FW	HAI	Jerry Desdunes
9	FW	USA	Joaquin Acuna
10	MF	USA	Miguel Ibarra
11	FW	FRA	Ilias Aoumaich
12	DF	USA	Nicholas Relerford
14	DF	NOR	Mathias Winum
16	DF	USA	Erick Ceja
17	FW	PHI	Javier Mariona
18	FW	FRA	Adam Aoumaich

No.	Pos.	Nation	Player
19	FW	JAM	Collin Anderson
20	FW	GHA	Godwin Antwi
21	MF	USA	Jimmie Villalobos
22	GK	TTO	Denzil Smith
23	MF	USA	Renden Thomas
27	GK	USA	Djibril Doumbia
32	MF	USA	Elliott Jahng
34	GK	USA	Desi Nelson
41	MF	USA	Erik Hernandez
42	MF	USA	Juaquin Garcia
44	DF	BUL	Kaloyan Pehlivanov
47	FW	USA	Jose Lopez
52	DF	USA	Steven Ramos
99	MF	USA	Cesar Bahena Jr

=== Club captains ===
Years	Name	Nation
2015–present	Miguel Pajaro	Colombia

== Record ==
=== Year-by-year ===
Season	USL League One								Playoffs	U.S. Open Cup	Top Scorer ^{1}	G
Season	P	W	D	L	GF	GA	Pts	Pos	Playoffs	U.S. Open Cup	Top Scorer ^{1}	G
2025	30	8	10	12	42	47	36	9th	Did not qualify	Round of 32	(United States) Eduardo Blancas	11

1. Top Scorer includes all goals scored in regular season, league playoffs, U.S. Open Cup, and other competitive continental matches.

== Honors ==
=== Player honors ===
Year	Player	Country	Position	Honor
2025	Eduardo Blancas	United States	Midfield	All-League Second Team
