= 2024 Spokane Velocity season =

Spokane Velocity
2024 season
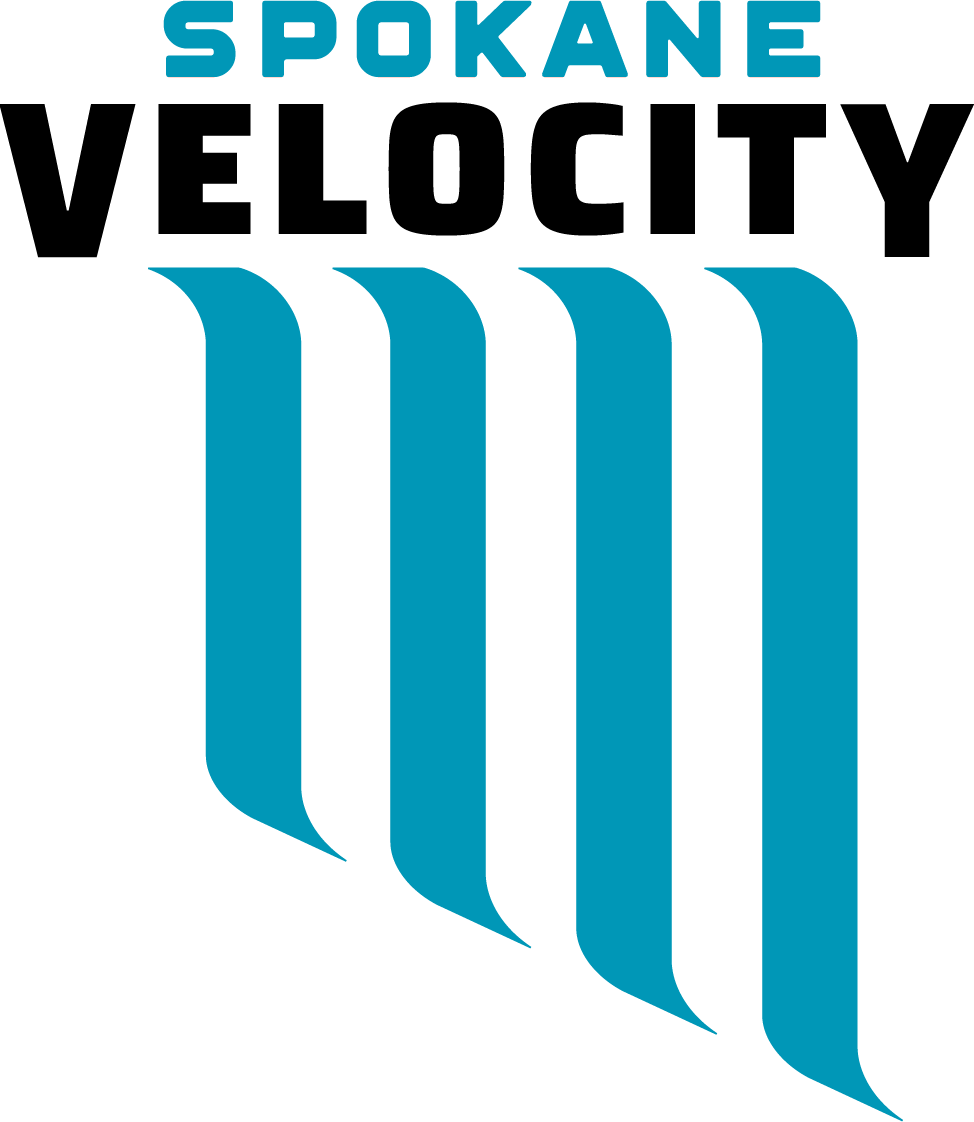
- Owner: Aequus Sports, LLC (Ryan and Katie Harnetiaux)
- Head coach: Leigh Veidman
- Stadium: One Spokane Stadium
- USL League One: 7th
- U.S. Open Cup: Third Round
- USL Cup: Group Stage
- USL Playoffs: Runners Up
- Top goalscorer: League: Josh Dolling, Luis Gil, (5 goals); All: Luis Gil, (11 goals)
- Highest home attendance: 5,086 March 16 vs Richmond Kickers
- Lowest home attendance: 3,108 September 7 vs Central Valley Fuego FC (2,423, April 3 US Open Cup vs Los Angeles Force)
- Average home league attendance: 3,913
- Biggest win: 2–0 April 20 vs Richmond Kickers
- Biggest defeat: 0–3 May 19 vs Forward Madison
- All statistics correct as of May 19, 2024.

The 2024 Spokane Velocity season is the inaugural season in the club's existence as well as their first in USL League One, the third-tier of American soccer.

== Players and staff ==
=== Current roster ===
As of August 9, 2024

Note: Flags indicate national team as defined under FIFA eligibility rules; some limited exceptions apply. Players may hold more than one non-FIFA nationality.

No.	Pos.	Nation	Player
1	GK	MEX	Carlos Merancio
2	DF	ESP	Javier Martín Gil
3	DF	USA	Elijah Amadin
5	DF	USA	Marcelo Lage
6	MF	PER	Collin Fernandez
7	MF	USA	Michael Rojas
8	MF	USA	Morgan Hackworth
9	FW	ENG	Josh Dolling
10	MF	USA	Luis Gil
11	MF	USA	Pierre Reedy
12	DF	USA	Camron Miller
14	MF	COD	Ariel Mbumba
15	DF	GAM	Ismaila Jome

No.	Pos.	Nation	Player
16	FW	COL	Anuar Peláez
17	MF	ENG	Kimarni Smith
18	DF	USA	Derek Waldeck
19	MF	ENG	Jack Denton
21	DF	USA	Ahmed Longmire
22	DF	MAD	Romain Métanire
23	MF	USA	Grayson Dupont
24	MF	USA	Azriel González
30	MF	USA	Masango Akale
31	GK	USA	Brooks Thompson (on loan from Hartford Athletic)
61	MF	USA	Joe Schmidt (on loan from Hartford Athletic)
77	MF	JAM	Andre Lewis
93	DF	USA	Luke Merrill

=== Staff ===
As of February 7, 2024

Front Office Staff
President, USL Spokane	Katie Harnetiaux
Vice President, Spokane Velocity FC	Phil Harrison
Director of Operations and Player Administration	Emma Hayes
Technical Staff
Head coach	Leigh Veidman
Assistant coach	Renato Bustamante
Goalkeeping coach	Vito Higgins
Director of Performance	Josh McAllister
VP of Soccer Operations	Dustin Clever
Sporting Department Consultant	Gareth Smith

== Transfers ==
=== In ===
Date	Position	Number	Name	from	Type	Fee	Ref.
December 20, 2023	MF	8	(United States) Morgan Hackworth	(United States) San Diego Loyal	Signing	NA	
December 20, 2023	DF	18	(United States) Derek Waldeck	(United States) One Knoxville SC	Signing	NA	
January 2024	DF	3	(Comoros) Alexis Souahy	(United States) Union Omaha	Signing	NA	
January 5, 2024	FW	9	(England) Josh Dolling	(United States) Las Vegas Lights	Signing	NA	
January 5, 2024	GK	1	(Mexico) Carlos Merancio	(United States) Rio Grande Valley FC Toros	Signing	NA	
January 5, 2024	MF	23	(United States) Grayson Dupont	(United States) Birmingham Legion FC	Signing	NA	
January 5, 2024	MF	19	(England) Jack Denton	(United States) Missouri State Bears	Signing	NA	
January 5, 2024	DF	2	(Spain) Javier Martin Gil	(United States) Missouri State Bears	Signing	NA	
January 12, 2024	DF	5	(United States) Marcelo Lage	(United States) Las Vegas Lights	Signing	NA	
January 12, 2024	MF	6	(Peru) Collin Fernandez	(United States) FC Tulsa	Signing	NA	
January 22, 2024	MF	10	(United States) Luis Gil	(United States) Union Omaha	Signing	NA	
January 23, 2024	DF	22	(Madagascar) Romain Métanire	(Belgium) Seraing	Signing	NA	
January 26, 2024	MF	11	(United States) Pierre Reedy	(United States) Charleston Battery	Signing	NA	
January 31, 2024	DF	21	(United States) Ahmed Longmire	(United States) Huntsville City FC	Signing	NA	
February 12, 2024	MF	77	(Jamaica) Andre Lewis	(United States) Hartford Athletic	Signing	NA	
February 12, 2024	GK	13	(United States) Peter Swinkels	(United States) One Knoxville SC	Signing	NA	
February 16, 2024	MF	17	(England) Kimarni Smith	(United States) Crown Legacy FC	Signing	NA	
March 1, 2024	DF	12	(United States) Camron Miller	NA	Signing	NA	
March 1, 2024	MF	7	(United States) Michael Rojas	(United States) UMass Minutemen	Signing	NA	
March 15, 2024	DF	3	(United States) Elijah Amadin	(United States) LA Galaxy II	Signing	NA	
April 2, 2024	MF	14	(Democratic Republic of the Congo) Ariel Mbumba	(United States) Columbus Crew 2	Signing	NA	
May 15, 2024	GK	31	(United States) Brooks Thompson	(United States) Hartford Athletic	On loan from Hartford Athletic	NA	
May 24, 2024	MF	24	(United States) Azriel González	(United States) Las Vegas Lights	Signing	NA	
June 12, 2024	MF	30	(United States) Masango Akale	(United States) Joy Athletic Club	Signing	NA	
June 21, 2024	DF	15	(The Gambia) Ismaila Jome	(United States) San Antonio FC	Signing	NA	
August 2, 2024	DF	93	(United States) Luke Merrill	(United States) Hartford Athletic	On loan from Hartford Athletic	NA	
August 3, 2024	MF	61	(United States) Joe Schmidt	(United States) Hartford Athletic	On loan from Hartford Athletic	NA	
August 9, 2024	FW	16	(Colombia) Anuar Peláez	(Colombia) C.D. Guastatoya	Signing	NA	

=== Out ===
Date	Position	Number	Name	to	Type	Fee	Ref.
February 1, 2024	DF	3	(Comoros) Alexis Souahy	(United States) FC Tulsa	Transfer	undisclosed	
May 14, 2024	GK	13	(United States) Peter Swinkels	NA	Retirement	NA	

== Non-competitive fixtures ==
=== Friendlies ===
March 2 Preseason Friendly	Spokane Velocity	1–3	Tacoma Defiance	Kennewick, Washington
4:00 PM PDT	Gil 38' (pen.)			Stadium: Lampson Stadium; Attendance: 1,000

June 2 Mid-season Friendly	Spokane Velocity	2–1	Chivas De Guadalajara U23s	Spokane, Washington
6:00 PM PDT	Dolling 17'; Smith 70'		Corona (yellow card) 22'; Waldeck 30' (og); Tame (yellow card) 47'; Gallegos (yellow card) 52'; Zavala (yellow card) 56'	Stadium: One Spokane Stadium; Attendance: 4,318

== Competitive fixtures ==
=== Regular season ===
March 9 1	Greenville Triumph SC	3–1	Spokane Velocity	Greenville, South Carolina
4:00 PM PDT	Scarlett 18'; Herrera (yellow card) 27'; Velásquez (yellow card) 45+2'; Lee 48'; Castro 60'	Report	Dolling 14' (pen.); Lage (yellow card) 45'	Stadium: Paladin Stadium; Attendance: 1,595; Referee: Nickrod Fateh

March 16 2	Spokane Velocity	2–1	Richmond Kickers	Spokane, Washington
2:00 PM PDT	Métanire 4'; Longmire 15'; Gil (yellow card) 72'	Report	Billhardt 20'; Morán (yellow card) 79'; Vinyals (yellow card) 90+2'	Stadium: One Spokane Stadium; Attendance: 5,086; Referee: Yannick Rothfuss

March 23 3	Spokane Velocity	1–0	Northern Colorado Hailstorm FC	Spokane, Washington
76:00 PM PDT	Gil 35' (pen.); Dolling (yellow card) 37'; Smith (yellow card) 76'; Merancio (yellow card) 90+1'	Report	García (yellow card) 34'; Delgado (yellow card) 84'	Stadium: One Spokane Stadium; Attendance: 3,376; Referee: Robert Vincze

March 28 4	Charlotte Independence	2–1	Spokane Velocity	Charlotte, North Carolina
4:30 PM PDT	Johnson 46'; Álvarez 90+6'	Report	Longmire (yellow card) 26'; Gil 72'; Reedy (yellow card) 90+8'	Stadium: American Legion Memorial Stadium; Attendance: 686; Referee: Jair Campos

April 14 5	Lexington SC	2–2	Spokane Velocity	Georgetown, Kentucky
1:00 PM PDT	Yankam 26'; Liadi 34'; Caputo (yellow card) 49'	Report	Longmire 19' (yellow card) 67'; Gil 37'; Denton (yellow card) 64'	Stadium: Toyota Stadium; Attendance: 1,209; Referee: Joe Surgan

April 20 6	Richmond Kickers	0–2	Spokane Velocity	Richmond, Virginia
3:00 PM PDT	Schenfeld (yellow card) 30'; Johnson (yellow card) 90+2'	Report	Métanire 32'; Longmire (yellow card) 44'; Fernandez (yellow card) 45+2'; bench (yellow card) 48'; Lewis 72'; Gil (yellow card) 88'	Stadium: City Stadium; Attendance: 5,368; Referee: Stearne Briem

May 19 7	Spokane Velocity	0–3	Forward Madison FC	Spokane, Washington
3:00 PM PDT	Smith (yellow card) 17'	Report	Villalobos 22'; Boyce 44'; Mesias 63'; Crull (yellow card) 72'; Schipmann (yellow card) 90+1'	Stadium: One Spokane Stadium; Attendance: 4,047; Referee: Christopher Calderon

June 23 8	Spokane Velocity	1–1	Lexington SC	Spokane, Washington
6:00 PM PDT	Dolling 48' (yellow card) 79'; Longmire (yellow card) 75'; Fernandez (yellow card) 75'	Report	Brown 27'; Corrales (yellow card) 59' (yellow-red card) 83'; Onen (yellow card) 70'; Chica (yellow card) 90+3'	Stadium: One Spokane Stadium; Attendance: 4,004; Referee: Yannick Rothfuss

July 6 9	Spokane Velocity	2–1	Chattanooga Red Wolves SC	Spokane, Washington
6:00 PM PDT	Akale 18' (yellow card) 67'; Fernandez (yellow card) 27'; Veidman (yellow card) 34'; Gil 38'; Longmire (yellow card) 86'	Report	Mackenzie (yellow card) 19'; Lukic (yellow card) 21'; Bush (yellow card) 22'; Malango 32' (yellow card) 88'; Ruiz (yellow card) 71'; Ualefi (yellow card) 86'	Stadium: One Spokane Stadium; Attendance: 3,825; Referee: Lukasz Jozefecki

July 27 10	Spokane Velocity	2–4	Charlotte Independence	Spokane, Washington
6:00 PM PDT	Dolling 31'; Longmire (yellow card) 42'; Veidman (yellow card) 44'; Akale 60'; Ismaila Jome (yellow card) 85' (yellow-red card) 90+4'	Report	Obregón 18', 43' (pen.); Jeffries (yellow card) 58'; Obertan 63'; Pack (yellow card) 69'; Johnson 72'	Stadium: One Spokane Stadium; Attendance: 4,013; Referee: Christopher Calderon

August 4 11	Tormenta FC	3–3	Spokane Velocity	Statesboro, Georgia
8:00 AM PDT	Walker 13'; Fonseca 19'; Ramos (yellow card) 30'; Dengler 60'; Kilwien (yellow card) 74'	Report	Dolling (yellow card) 21' (goal) 56'; Gil 45+2'; Lewis 87'	Stadium: Tormenta Stadium; Attendance: 1,407; Referee: Igor Bych

August 7 12	Chattanooga Red Wolves	0–1	Spokane Velocity	East Ridge, Tennessee
4:30 PM PDT	Marsh (yellow card) 70'; Malango (yellow card) 80'; Jnohope (yellow card) 90+6'	Report	Lage (yellow card) 45+1'; Lewis 49'; Longmire (yellow card) 83'; Dolling (yellow card) 86'; Denton (yellow card) 87'	Stadium: CHI Memorial Stadium; Attendance: 1,934; Referee: Ryan Farrell

August 23 13	One Knoxville SC	1–1	Spokane Velocity	Knoxville, Tennessee
4:00 PM PDT	Tekiela 28'; Zarokóstas (yellow card) 66'	Report	Denton (yellow card) 33'; Gil (yellow card) 40'; Longmire 59'; Lewis (yellow card) 82'	Stadium: Regal Stadium; Attendance: 1,464; Referee: Olvin Oliva

September 4 14	Spokane Velocity	2–1	Union Omaha	Spokane, Washington
6:00 PM PDT	Miller (yellow card) 39' (goal) 74'; Gil 47'	Report	Lewis (yellow card) 49'; Mastrontonio (yellow card) 73'; Dolabella 90+5'	Stadium: One Spokane Stadium; Attendance: 3,456; Referee: Rafael Bonilla

September 7 15	Spokane Velocity	3–2	Central Valley Fuego FC	Spokane, Washington
6:00 PM PDT	Waldeck (yellow card) 6'; Lewis 20'; González 27'; Jome (yellow card) 31' (goal) 43'; Miller (yellow card) 65'	Report	Lemus (yellow card) 15'; Vazquez 25' (yellow card) 55'; Nembhard (yellow card) 41'; Garcia 82'	Stadium: One Spokane Stadium; Attendance: 3,108; Referee: Jair Campos

September 14 16	Spokane Velocity	0–0	Tormenta FC	Spokane, Washington
6:00 PM PDT	Lage (yellow card) 54'; Longmire (red card) 54'; Fernandez (yellow card) 81'	Report	Spengler (yellow card) 18'; Dengler (yellow card) 54'	Stadium: One Spokane Stadium; Attendance: 3,564; Referee: Lukasz Jozefecki

September 21 17	Forward Madison FC	2–0	Spokane Velocity	Madison, Wisconsin
3:00 PM PDT	Murphy 16'; Mehl (yellow card) 45+2'; Prentice (yellow card) 53'; Gebhard 66'; Cichero (yellow card) 90'	Report	Dolling (yellow card) 42'; Akale (yellow card) 59' (yellow-red card) 59'; Gil (yellow card) 61'; Lage (yellow card) 75'	Stadium: Breese Stevens Field; Attendance: 4,856; Referee: Fevzi Demirhan

October 2 18	Union Omaha	4–0	Spokane Velocity	Papillion, Nebraska
10:00 AM PDT	Mastrantonio (yellow card) 17'; Lewis (yellow card) 36'; Gómez 43' 48' (yellow card) 83'; Ostrem 55'; Jérôme 59'; Kunga (yellow card) 75'	Report	Veidman (yellow card) 35'	Stadium: Werner Park; Attendance: 4,509; Referee: DeShun Beard

October 9 19	Central Valley Fuego FC	1–0	Spokane Velocity	Fresno, California
7:00 PM PDT	Vinberg 5'; Torr (yellow card) 40'	Report	Dolling (yellow card) 28'; Miller (yellow card) 43'; Fernandez (yellow card) 58'; Longmire (yellow card) 90+3'	Stadium: Fresno State Soccer Stadium; Attendance: 960; Referee: José Lara

October 12 20	Spokane Velocity	2–3	Greenville Triumph SC	Spokane, Washington
6:00 PM PDT	Denton (yellow card) 32'; Peláez (yellow card) 54' (goal) 90+2'; Dolling (yellow card) 69' (goal) 73' (pen.); Schmidt (yellow card) 83'	Report	MacKinnon 17' (pen.), 23'; Castro 67'; Herrera (yellow card) 90+7'; Garner (yellow card) 90+7'	Stadium: One Spokane Stadium; Attendance: 3,638; Referee: Igor Bych

October 19 21	Northern Colorado Hailstorm FC	1–0	Spokane Velocity	Windsor, Colorado
6:00 PM PDT	Keegan 32'; Dietrich (yellow card) 50'	Report		Stadium: 4Rivers Equipment Stadium; Attendance: 1,119; Referee: Jair Campos

October 26 22	Spokane Velocity	0–0	One Knoxville SC	Spokane, Washington
7:00 PM PDT	Lage (yellow card) 24'; Miller (yellow card) 81'	Report	Crisler (yellow card) 24'; Haugli (yellow card) 27'; Zarokóstas (yellow card) 34'	Stadium: One Spokane Stadium; Attendance: 3,701; Referee: Joshua Madison

=== Playoffs ===
November 2 Quarterfinals	Northern Colorado Hailstorm FC	0–3	Spokane Velocity	Windsor, Colorado
7:00 PM MDT	Powder (yellow card) 23'; Kwakwa (yellow card) 77'	Report	Gil 53'; Peláez 64'; Denton 68'	Stadium: 4Rivers Equipment Stadium; Attendance: 1,601; Referee: Gerald Flores

November 9 Semifinals	Forward Madison	0–0 (a.e.t.) (4–5 p)	Spokane Velocity	Madison, Wisconsin
6:00 PM CDT	Chaney (yellow card) 115'	Report	Dolling (yellow card) 71'; Lage (yellow card) 88'; Jome (yellow card) 90+2'	Stadium: Breese Stevens Field; Attendance: 4,495; Referee: Thomas Snyder
	Penalties
	Boyce (penalty scored); McLaughlin (penalty scored); Dieye (penalty missed); Villalobos (penalty scored); Chaney (penalty scored)		(penalty scored) Dolling; (penalty scored) Peláez; (penalty scored) González; (penalty scored) Lewis; (penalty scored) Fernandez

November 17 USL League One Final	Union Omaha	3–0	Spokane Velocity	Papillion, Nebraska
12:00 PM PDT	Schneider 3'; Dolabella 19'; Kunga 71'	Report	Akale (yellow card) 7'; Miller (yellow card) 45'; Peláez (yellow card) 88'	Stadium: Werner Park; Attendance: 5,849

=== Lamar Hunt US Open Cup ===
March 20 First Round	Ballard FC	0–1	Spokane Velocity	Seattle, Washington
7:30 PM PDT	Rink (yellow card) 90+3'		Dolling (yellow card) 56'; Amadin (yellow card) 61'; Lewis (yellow card) 72' (goal) 90+7'; Longmire (yellow card) 73'; Fernandez (yellow card) 75'	Stadium: Memorial Stadium; Attendance: 2,452

April 3 Second Round	Spokane Velocity	1–0	Los Angeles Force	Spokane, Washington
7:30 PM PDT	Hackworth (yellow card) 42'; Métanire (yellow card) 75'; Reedy (yellow card) 83'; Gil 85'; Swinkels (yellow card) 90'	Report	Jovel (yellow card) 26'	Stadium: One Spokane Stadium; Attendance: 2,423; Referee: Elorm Atisu

April 16 Third Round	Las Vegas Lights FC	2–1 (a.e.t.)	Spokane Velocity	Las Vegas, Nevada
7:30 PM PDT	Garcia (yellow card) 12'; Noël (yellow card) 16' (goal) 51'; Nigro (yellow card) 64'; Alba 112'	Report	Miller (yellow card) 43'; Waldeck (yellow card) 73' (yellow-red card) 90+3'; Lewis 90+6'	Stadium: Cashman Field; Attendance: 1,197; Referee: Alexis Da Silva

=== USL Cup ===
April 27 Group Stage	Spokane Velocity	1–1 (2–4 SO)	Central Valley Fuego FC	Spokane, Washington
3:00 PM PDT	Fernandez (yellow card) 14'; Reedy 20'; Lage (yellow card) 44'; Dolling (yellow card) 50'; Lewis (yellow card) 63'; Denton (yellow card) 76'; Veidman (yellow card) 90+4'	Report	Torr (yellow card) 11'; Heckenberg (yellow card) 16'; Yaya (yellow card) 63'; John-Brown (yellow card) 81'; Coronado 90+4' (pen.)	Stadium: One Spokane Stadium; Attendance: 4,181; Referee: Michael Zapata
	Shootout
	Gil (penalty scored); Métanire (penalty missed); Lewis (penalty scored); Waldeck (penalty missed)		(penalty scored) Mendiola; (penalty scored) Coronado; (penalty missed) Carrera-García; (penalty scored) John-Brown; (penalty scored) Vazquez

May 11 Group Stage	Spokane Velocity	3–2	Union Omaha	Spokane, Washington
6:00 PM PDT	Lewis 16'; Gil 56'; Gil 90+3' (yellow card) 90+4'	Report	Mastrantonio (yellow card) 4'; Rodríguez 11'; Dolabella 51' (pen.); Milanese (yellow card) 65'; Gómez (yellow card) 90+1'	Stadium: One Spokane Stadium; Attendance: 4,523; Referee: Rafael Bonilla

May 25 Group Stage	Spokane Velocity	0–0 (4–5 SO)	Greenville Triumph SC	Spokane, Washington
6:00 PM PDT	Gil (yellow card) 72'; Denton (yellow card) 84'	Report	Lee (yellow card) 51'	Stadium: One Spokane Stadium; Attendance: 4,503; Referee: Mark Verso
	Shootout
	Dolling (penalty scored); González (penalty missed); Mbumba (penalty scored); Smith (penalty scored); Fernandez (penalty scored); Waldeck (penalty missed)		(penalty missed) Polak; (penalty scored) MacKinnon; (penalty scored) Herrera; (penalty scored) Smith; (penalty scored) Lee; (penalty scored) Velásquez

June 13 Group Stage	Union Omaha	4–1	Spokane Velocity	Papillion, Nebraska
5:00 PM PDT	Rodríguez 16'; Malone (yellow card) 32'; Dolabella 63' (yellow card) 81'; Gallardo (yellow card) 77'; Kunga 82' (yellow card) 83'; dos Santos 90+5' (pen.); Bronnik (yellow card) 90+7'	Report	Gil 33' (pen.); Veidman (yellow card) 45'; Lage (yellow card) 60'; Miller (yellow card) 90+4'	Stadium: Werner Park; Attendance: 3,188; Referee: José Lara

June 29 Group Stage	Northern Colorado Hailstorm FC	3–1	Spokane Velocity	Windsor, Colorado
6:00 PM PDT	Hoard 7'; Rendón 21'; Yamazaki (yellow card) 45+2'; Zayed (yellow card) 45+3' (yellow-red card) 45+4'; King (yellow card) 52'; Longmire 74' (o.g.)	Report	Veidman (yellow card) 19'; Longmire (yellow card) 41'; Gil 62'	Stadium: 4Rivers Equipment Stadium; Attendance: 1,459; Referee: Turan Ozdemir

July 19 Group Stage	Central Valley Fuego FC	1–0	Spokane Velocity	Fresno, California
7:30 PM PDT	Yaya (yellow card) 26'; John-Brown 53'	Report		Stadium: Fresno State Soccer Stadium; Attendance: 482; Referee: Rafael Bonilla

August 13 Group Stage	Spokane Velocity	1–3	Northern Colorado Hailstorm FC	Spokane, Washington
6:00 PM PDT	Gil 49'; Schmidt (yellow card) 69'	Report	Rendón 46'; Hernández (yellow card) 64'; Opara (yellow card) 67'; Powder 77' (yellow card) 90+4'; Hoard 87' (pen.)	Stadium: One Spokane Stadium; Attendance: 3,665; Referee: Servando Berna Rico

August 29 Group Stage	Richmond Kickers	3–2	Spokane Velocity	Richmond, Virginia
4:00 PM PDT	O'Dwyer 6', 34'; Vaughan (yellow card) 26'; Sukow 88'; Aune (yellow card) 90+5'	Report	González 46'; Miller 67'	Stadium: City Stadium; Attendance: 3,579; Referee: Rafael Santos

== Statistics ==
Updated as of October 3, 2024.

=== Appearances and goals ===
No.	Pos	Nat	Player	Total		USL League One		Lamar Hunt US Open Cup		USL Cup		USL League One Playoffs	
No.	Pos	Nat	Player	Apps	Goals	Apps	Goals	Apps	Goals	Apps	Goals	Apps	Goals
1	GK	(Mexico) MEX	Carlos Merancio	14	0	7+0	0	0+0	0	7+0	0	0+0	0
2	DF	(Spain) ESP	Javier Martín Gil	34	2	13+9	1	2+0	0	5+2	1	3+0	0
3	DF	(United States) USA	Elijah Amadin	4	0	0+1	0	3+0	0	0+0	0	0+0	0
5	DF	(United States) USA	Marcelo Lage	34	0	20+1	0	1+1	0	7+1	0	3+0	0
6	MF	(Peru) PER	Collin Fernandez	30	0	14+3	0	0+3	0	6+1	0	0+3	0
7	MF	(United States) USA	Michael Rojas	4	0	0+2	0	2+0	0	0+0	0	0+0	0
8	DF	(United States) USA	Morgan Hackworth	6	0	0+2	0	3+0	0	0+1	0	0+0	0
9	FW	(England) ENG	Josh Dolling	36	5	18+4	5	1+2	0	6+2	0	0+3	0
10	MF	(United States) USA	Luis Gil	33	11	20+0	5	1+1	1	7+1	4	3+0	1
11	MF	(United States) USA	Pierre Reedy	13	1	7+0	0	3+0	0	3+0	1	0+0	0
12	DF	(United States) USA	Camron Miller	29	2	13+4	1	3+0	0	3+3	1	3+0	0
13	GK	(United States) USA	Peter Swinkels	3	0	0+0	0	3+0	0	0+0	0	0+0	0
14	MF	(Democratic Republic of the Congo) COD	Ariel Mbumba	19	0	1+10	0	1+0	0	3+4	0	0+0	0
15	DF	(The Gambia) GAM	Ismaila Jome	21	1	10+4	1	0+0	0	2+2	0	0+3	0
16	FW	(Colombia) COL	Anuar Peláez	9	2	3+3	1	0+0	0	0+0	0	3+0	1
17	MF	(England) ENG	Kimarni Smith	32	0	12+7	0	2+1	0	5+2	0	3+0	0
18	DF	(United States) USA	Derek Waldeck	36	0	20+2	0	0+3	0	6+2	0	3+0	0
19	MF	(England) ENG	Jack Denton	33	1	12+9	0	3+0	0	2+4	0	3+0	1
21	DF	(United States) USA	Ahmed Longmire	29	3	17+1	3	1+1	0	7+1	0	0+1	0
22	DF	(Madagascar) MAD	Romain Métanire	11	2	5+1	2	1+2	0	2+0	0	0+0	0
23	MF	(United States) USA	Grayson Dupont	1	0	0+1	0	0+0	0	0+0	0	0+0	0
24	MF	(United States) USA	Azriel González	20	2	5+8	1	0+0	0	2+3	1	0+2	0
30	MF	(United States) USA	Masango Akale	20	2	10+2	2	0+0	0	4+1	0	3+0	0
31	GK	(United States) USA	Brooks Thompson	19	0	15+0	0	0+0	0	1+0	0	3+0	0
61	MF	(United States) USA	Joe Schmidt	8	0	0+5	0	0+0	0	2+0	0	0+1	0
77	MF	(Jamaica) JAM	Andre Lewis	34	7	18+3	4	2+1	2	6+1	1	3+0	0
93	DF	(United States) USA	Luke Merrill	9	0	1+6	0	0+0	0	2+0	0	0+0	0

=== Top goalscorers ===
Rank	Position	Name	USL1 Season	U.S. Open Cup	USL Cup	USL League One Playoffs	Total
1	MF	(United States) Luis Gil	5	1	4	1	11
2	MF	(Jamaica) Andre Lewis	4	2	1	0	7
3	FW	(England) Josh Dolling	5	0	0	0	5
4	DF	(United States) Ahmed Longmire	3	0	0	0	3
5	DF	(Madagascar) Romain Métanire	2	0	0	0	2
5	MF	(United States) Masango Akale	2	0	0	0	2
5	DF	(Spain) Javier Martín Gil	1	0	1	0	2
5	DF	(United States) Camron Miller	1	0	1	0	2
5	MF	(United States) Azriel González	1	0	1	0	2
5	FW	(Colombia) Anuar Peláez	1	0	0	1	2
11	DF	(The Gambia) Ismaila Jome	1	0	0	0	1
11	MF	(United States) Pierre Reedy	0	0	1	0	1
11	MF	(England) Jack Denton	0	0	0	1	1
Total			26	3	9	3	41

=== Assist scorers ===
Rank	Position	Name	USL1 Season	U.S. Open Cup	USL Cup	USL League One Playoffs	Total
1	MF	(United States) Luis Gil	5	0	0	0	5
1	FW	(England) Josh Dolling	3	1	1	0	5
3	MF	(United States) Masango Akale	2	0	1	1	4
4	MF	(Jamaica) Andre Lewis	3	0	0	0	3
4	DF	(United States) Derek Waldeck	2	0	1	0	3
6	MF	(England) Jack Denton	2	0	0	0	2
6	MF	(United States) Pierre Reedy	2	0	0	0	2
8	MF	(Peru) Collin Fernandez	1	0	0	0	1
8	DF	(Madagascar) Romain Métanire	0	0	1	0	1
8	DF	(Spain) Javier Martín Gil	0	0	0	1	1
Total			21	1	4	2	28

=== Clean sheets ===
Rank	Name	USL1 Season	U.S. Open Cup	USL Cup	Total
1	(Mexico) Carlos Merancio	2	0	1	3
2	(United States) Peter Swinkels	0	2	0	2
3	(United States) Brooks Thompson	1	0	0	1
Total		3	2	1	6

=== Disciplinary record ===
No.	Pos.	Player	USL League One Regular Season			Lamar Hunt US Open Cup			USL Cup			USL League One Playoffs			Total		
No.	Pos.	Player	Booked	(yellow card) (yellow-red card)	Sent off (straight red)	Booked	(yellow card) (yellow-red card)	Sent off (straight red)	Booked	(yellow card) (yellow-red card)	Sent off (straight red)	Booked	(yellow card) (yellow-red card)	Sent off (straight red)	Booked	(yellow card) (yellow-red card)	Sent off (straight red)
1	GK	(Mexico) Carlos Merancio	1	0	0	0	0	0	0	0	0	0	0	0	1	0	0
2	DF	(Spain) Javier Martín Gil	1	0	0	0	0	0	2	0	0	0	0	0	3	0	0
3	DF	(United States) Elijah Amadin	0	0	0	1	0	0	0	0	0	0	0	0	1	0	0
5	DF	(United States) Marcelo Lage	5	0	0	0	0	0	2	0	0	1	0	0	7	0	0
6	MF	(Peru) Collin Fernandez	6	0	0	1	0	0	1	0	0	0	0	0	8	0	0
7	MF	(United States) Michael Rojas	0	0	0	0	0	0	0	0	0	0	0	0	0	0	0
8	MF	(United States) Morgan Hackworth	0	0	0	1	0	0	0	0	0	0	0	0	1	0	0
9	FW	(England) Josh Dolling	6	0	0	1	0	0	0	0	0	1	0	0	8	0	0
10	MF	(United States) Luis Gil	3	0	0	0	0	0	0	0	0	0	0	0	3	0	0
11	MF	(United States) Pierre Reedy	1	0	0	1	0	0	0	0	0	0	0	0	2	0	0
12	DF	(United States) Camron Miller	4	0	0	1	0	0	1	0	0	1	0	0	6	0	0
13	GK	(United States) Peter Swinkels	0	0	0	1	0	0	0	0	0	0	0	0	1	0	0
14	MF	(Democratic Republic of the Congo) Ariel Mbumba	0	0	0	0	0	0	0	0	0	0	0	0	0	0	0
15	DF	(The Gambia) Ismaila Jome	3	1	0	0	0	0	0	0	0	1	0	0	3	1	0
16	MF	(Colombia) Anuar Peláez	1	0	0	0	0	0	0	0	0	1	0	0	0	1	0
17	MF	(England) Kimarni Smith	2	0	0	0	0	0	0	0	0	0	0	0	2	0	0
18	DF	(United States) Derek Waldeck	1	0	0	1	1	0	0	0	0	0	0	0	2	1	0
19	MF	(England) Jack Denton	4	0	0	0	0	0	2	0	0	0	0	0	6	0	0
21	DF	(United States) Ahmed Longmire	8	0	1	1	0	0	1	0	0	0	0	0	10	0	1
22	DF	(Madagascar) Romain Métanire	0	0	0	1	0	0	0	0	0	0	0	0	1	0	0
23	MF	(United States) Grayson Dupont	0	0	0	0	0	0	0	0	0	0	0	0	0	0	0
24	MF	(United States) Azriel González	0	0	0	0	0	0	0	0	0	0	0	0	0	0	0
30	MF	(United States) Masango Akale	3	1	0	0	0	0	0	0	0	1	0	0	2	1	0
31	GK	(United States) Brooks Thompson	0	0	0	0	0	0	0	0	0	0	0	0	0	0	0
61	MF	(United States) Joe Schmidt	1	0	0	0	0	0	1	0	0	0	0	0	0	2	0
77	MF	(Jamaica) Andre Lewis	1	0	0	1	0	0	2	0	0	0	0	0	4	0	0
93	DF	(United States) Luke Merrill	0	0	0	0	0	0	0	0	0	0	0	0	0	0	0
		Bench	4	0	0	0	0	0	2	0	0	0	0	0	6	0	0
Total			55	2	1	13	1	0	13	0	0	6	0	0	87	3	1

== Awards and honors ==
=== USL League One All Team ===
Team	Player	Position	Ref
First Team	(United States) Luis Gil	MF	

=== USL League One Team of the Matchday ===
Matchday	Player	Opponent	Position	Ref
1	(England) Josh Dolling	Greenville Triumph SC	FW	
1	(England) Jack Denton	Greenville Triumph SC	Bench	
1	(United States) Pierre Reedy	Greenville Triumph SC	Bench	
2	(England) Leigh Veidman	Richmond Kickers	Coach	
2	(United States) Ahmed Longmire	Richmond Kickers	DF	
2	(Madagascar) Romain Métanire	Richmond Kickers	DF	
2	(England) Jack Denton	Richmond Kickers	Bench	
2	(United States) Luis Gil	Richmond Kickers	Bench	
3	(United States) Marcelo Lage	Northern Colorado Hailstorm	DF	
3	(Madagascar) Romain Métanire	Northern Colorado Hailstorm	DF	
3	(United States) Luis Gil	Northern Colorado Hailstorm	MF	
3	(United States) Ahmed Longmire	Northern Colorado Hailstorm	Bench	
4	(United States) Pierre Reedy	Charlotte Independence	Bench	
6	(England) Jack Denton	Lexington SC	MF	
6	(United States) Luis Gil	Lexington SC	MF	
7	(England) Leigh Veidman	Richmond Kickers	Coach	
7	(Madagascar) Romain Métanire	Richmond Kickers	DF	
7	(Peru) Collin Fernandez	Richmond Kickers	MF	
7	(Jamaica) Andre Lewis	Richmond Kickers	MF	
7	(United States) Pierre Reedy	Richmond Kickers	MF	
12	(United States) Ahmed Longmire	Lexington SC	DF	
12	(United States) Masango Akale	Lexington SC	Bench	
12	(Peru) Collin Fernandez	Lexington SC	Bench	
12	(United States) Luis Gil	Lexington SC	Bench	
12	(United States) Derek Waldeck	Lexington SC	Bench	
13	(United States) Brooks Thompson	Chattanooga Red Wolves SC	GK	
13	(United States) Ahmed Longmire	Chattanooga Red Wolves SC	DF	
13	(United States) Masango Akale	Chattanooga Red Wolves SC	MF	
13	(United States) Luis Gil	Chattanooga Red Wolves SC	MF	
13	(Jamaica) Andre Lewis	Chattanooga Red Wolves SC	Bench	
15	(United States) Masango Akale	Charlotte Independence	MF	
16	(United States) Camron Miller	South Georgia Tormenta FC and Chattanooga Red Wolves SC	DF	
16	(United States) Derek Waldeck	South Georgia Tormenta FC and Chattanooga Red Wolves SC	DF	
16	(United States) Luis Gil	South Georgia Tormenta FC and Chattanooga Red Wolves SC	MF	
16	(Jamaica) Andre Lewis	South Georgia Tormenta FC and Chattanooga Red Wolves SC	MF	
16	(England) Josh Dolling	South Georgia Tormenta FC and Chattanooga Red Wolves SC	FW	
16	(United States) Brooks Thompson	South Georgia Tormenta FC and Chattanooga Red Wolves SC	Bench	
18	(United States) Ahmed Longmire	One Knoxville SC	DF	
18	(United States) Derek Waldeck	One Knoxville SC	Bench	
19	(England) Leigh Veidman	Union Omaha And Central Valley Fuego FC	Coach	
19	(United States) Marcelo Lage	Union Omaha And Central Valley Fuego FC	DF	
19	(United States) Camron Miller	Union Omaha And Central Valley Fuego FC	DF	
19	(Jamaica) Andre Lewis	Union Omaha And Central Valley Fuego FC	MF	
19	(United States) Luis Gil	Union Omaha And Central Valley Fuego FC	MF	
19	(United States) Derek Waldeck	Union Omaha And Central Valley Fuego FC	Bench	
20	(Peru) Collin Fernandez	South Georgia Tormenta FC	Coach	
20	(United States) Brooks Thompson	South Georgia Tormenta FC	Bench	
23	(England) Josh Dolling	Greenville Triumph SC	FW	
23	(United States) Derek Waldeck	Greenville Triumph SC	Bench	

=== USL League One Player of the Week ===
Matchday	Player	Opponent	Position	Reason	Ref
3	(United States) Luis Gil	Northern Colorado Hailstorm FC	MF	Game Winning PK	
16	(Jamaica) Andre Lewis	South Georgia Tormenta FC and Chattanooga Red Wolves SC	MF	2 Goals 1 Assist in 2 games	
19	(United States) Luis Gil	Union Omaha And Central Valley Fuego FC	MF	1 Goal 1 Assist in 2 games	

=== USL League One Goal of the Week ===
Week	Player	Opponent	Position	Ref
19	(United States) Azriel Gonzalez	Central Valley Fuego FC	MF	

=== USL League One Save of the Week ===
Week	Player	Opponent	Ref
19	(United States) Brooks Thompson	Central Valley Fuego FC	

=== USL Cup Team of the Round ===
Round	Player	Opponent	Position	Ref
1	(United States) Ahmed Longmire	Central Valley Fuego FC	Bench	
2	(Madagascar) Romain Métanire	Union Omaha	DF	
2	(Jamaica) Andre Lewis	Union Omaha	MF	
3	(Mexico) Carlos Merancio	Greenville Triumph SC	GK	
3	(United States) Ahmed Longmire	Greenville Triumph SC	DF	
3	(Peru) Collin Fernandez	Greenville Triumph SC	Bench	
5	(United States) Luis Gil	Northern Colorado Hailstorm	Bench	
7	(United States) Luis Gil	Northern Colorado Hailstorm	Bench	
8	(United States) Camron Miller	Richmond Kickers	DF	
8	(United States) Derek Waldeck	Richmond Kickers	Bench	

=== USL Cup Goal of the Round ===
Week	Player	Opponent	Position	Ref
1	(United States) Pierre Reedy	Central Valley Fuego FC	MF	

=== USL Cup Save of the Round ===
Week	Player	Opponent	Ref
3	(Mexico) Carlos Merancio	Greenville Triumph SC	
