= 2025 Spokane Velocity season =

Spokane Velocity
2025 season
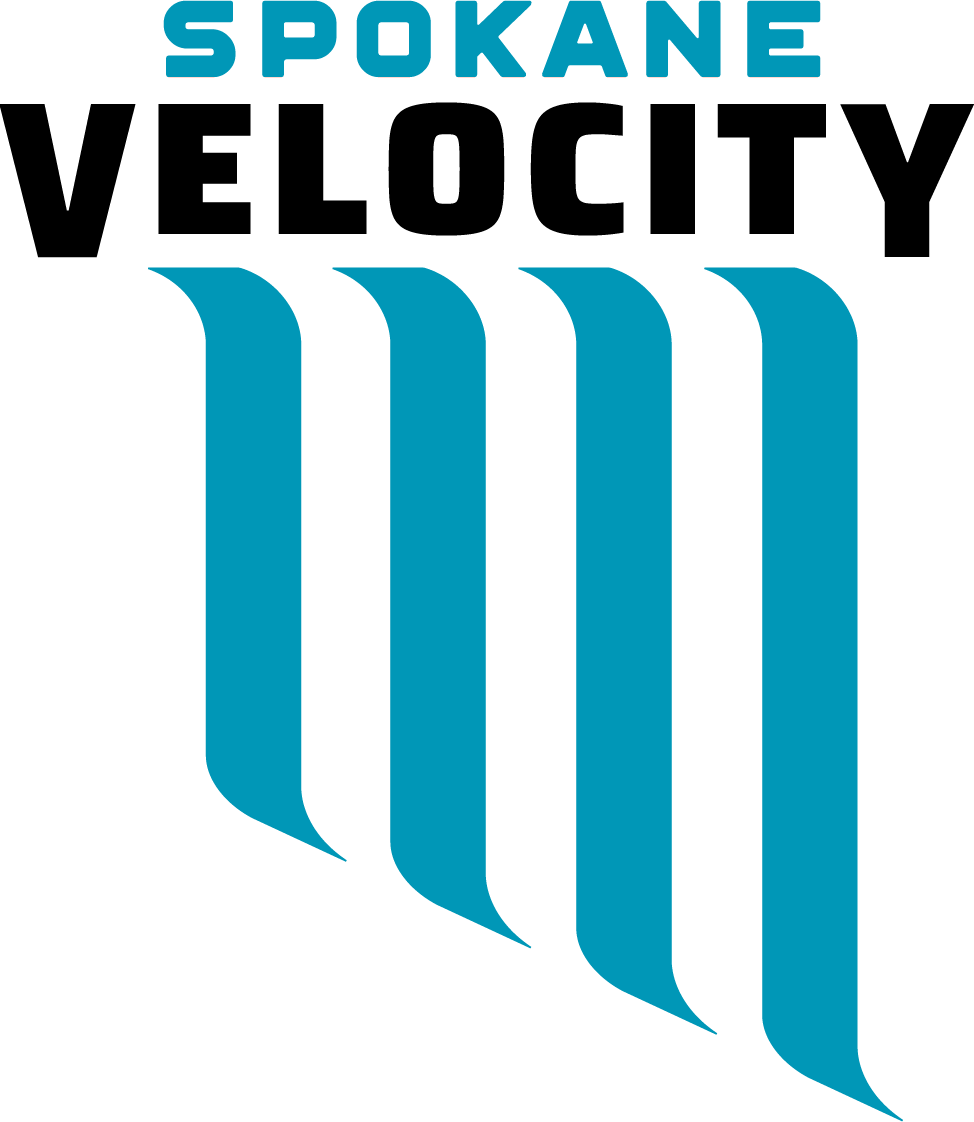
- Owner: Aequus Sports, LLC (Ryan and Katie Harnetiaux)
- Head coach: Leigh Veidman
- Stadium: One Spokane Stadium
- USL League One: 3rd
- U.S. Open Cup: Second Round
- USL Cup: Group Stage
- USL Playoffs: Runners Up
- Top goalscorer: League: Anuar Peláez (9 goals); All: Anuar Peláez (12 goals)
- Highest home attendance: USL Cup 3,068 vs Sacramento Republic FC July 26, League 2,848 vs AV Alta FC August 9
- Lowest home attendance: 1,680 vs Union Omaha August 2
- Average home league attendance: 2,347, Including USL Cup 2,381, Including USL Cup and Playoffs 2,407
- Biggest win: Greenville Triumph SC 0–4 Spokane Velocity FC, March 29
- Biggest defeat: Portland Hearts of Pine 6-1 Spokane Velocity FC, October 21
- All statistics correct as of December 19, 2024.

The 2025 Spokane Velocity season was the second season in the club's existence as well as their second in USL League One, the third-tier of American soccer.

== Players and staff ==
=== Current roster ===
As of July 8, 2025

Note: Flags indicate national team as defined under FIFA eligibility rules; some limited exceptions apply. Players may hold more than one non-FIFA nationality.

No.	Pos.	Nation	Player
1	GK	USA	Ryan Bilichuk
2	DF	ESP	Javier Martín Gil
3	DF	USA	Jalen Crisler
4	DF	ESP	David García
6	MF	PER	Collin Fernandez
7	MF	USA	Masango Akale
8	MF	ESP	Nil Vinyals
9	FW	JAM	Neco Brett
10	MF	USA	Luis Gil
11	MF	USA	Pierre Reedy
12	DF	USA	Camron Miller

No.	Pos.	Nation	Player
13	DF	NGR	Lucky Opara
14	FW	USA	Mark Hernández
15	DF	GAM	Ismaila Jome
16	FW	COL	Anuar Peláez
17	FW	GRN	Shavon John-Brown
18	DF	USA	Derek Waldeck
19	MF	ENG	Jack Denton
22	FW	USA	Rocky Wells
23	GK	MEX	Carlos Merancio
42	MF	USA	Bryce Meredith
77	MF	JAM	Andre Lewis

USL Academy Contract

== Staff ==
As of October 18, 2024

Technical Staff
Head coach	Leigh Veidman
Assistant coach	Renato Bustamante
Goalkeeping coach	Vito Higgins
Front Office Staff
President, USL Spokane	Katie Harnetiaux

== Transfers ==
=== In ===
Date	Position	Number	Name	from	Type	Fee	Ref.
February 14, 2025	MF	14	(United States) Mark Hernández	(United States) Northern Colorado Hailstorm FC	Signing	NA	
February 21, 2025	DF	13	(Nigeria) Lucky Opara	(United States) Northern Colorado Hailstorm FC	Signing	NA	
February 21, 2025	MF	8	(Spain) Nil Vinyals	(United States) Richmond Kickers	Signing	NA	
February 25, 2025	FW	9	(Jamaica) Neco Brett	(United States) Memphis 901 FC	Signing	NA	
February 26, 2025	DF	4	(Spain) Davíd Garcia	(United States) Northern Colorado Hailstorm FC	Signing	NA	
March 4, 2025	FW	17	(Grenada) Shavon John-Brown	(United States) Central Valley Fuego FC	Signing	NA	
March 6, 2025	GK	1	(United States) Ryan Bilichuk	(United States) Portland Timbers 2	Signing	NA	
March 13, 2025	DF	3	(United States) Jalen Crisler	(United States) One Knoxville SC	Signing	NA	
March 13, 2025	DF	22	(United States) Rocky Wells	(United States) Spokane Velocity Academy	USL Academy Contract	NA	
April 11, 2025	MF	42	(United States) Bryce Meredith	(United States) Michigan Stars FC	Signing	NA	
May 9, 2025	GK	37	(United States) Jackson Buck	(United States) Everett Jets FC	25 day contract	NA	

=== Out ===
Date	Position	Number	Name	to	Type	Fee	Ref.
November 27, 2024	DF	3	(United States) Elijah Amadin		Roster Decisions	NA	
November 27, 2024	MF	7	(United States) Michael Rojas		Roster Decisions	NA	
November 27, 2024	MF	8	(United States) Morgan Hackworth	Retired	Roster Decisions	NA	
November 27, 2024	FW	9	(England) Josh Dolling	(England) AFC Totton	Roster Decisions	NA	
November 27, 2024	MF	14	(Democratic Republic of the Congo) Ariel Mbumba	(United States) The Town FC	Roster Decisions	NA	
November 27, 2024	MF	17	(England) Kimarni Smith	(United States) One Knoxville SC	Roster Decisions	NA	
November 27, 2024	DF	21	(United States) Ahmed Longmire		Roster Decisions	NA	
November 27, 2024	DF	22	(Madagascar) Romain Métanire		Roster Decisions	NA	
November 27, 2024	MF	23	(United States) Grayson Dupont		Roster Decisions	NA	
November 27, 2024	MF	24	(United States) Azriel González		Roster Decisions	NA	
November 27, 2024	GK	31	(United States) Brooks Thompson	(United States) Hartford Athletic	Loan Expired	NA	
November 27, 2024	MF	61	(United States) Joe Schmidt	(United States) Hartford Athletic	Loan Expired	NA	
November 27, 2024	DF	93	(United States) Luke Merrill	(Armenia) Gandzasar Kapan FC	Roster Decisions	NA	
July 8, 2025	DF	5	(United States) Marcelo Lage	(United States) Richmond Kickers	Contract mutually terminated	NA	

== Competitive fixtures ==
=== Regular season ===
March 16 1	Spokane Velocity	2–2	One Knoxville SC	Spokane, Washington
4:00 PM PDT	Miller 40'; Gøling 47' (o.g.); Fernandez (yellow card) 90+5'	Report	Gøling 60'; Kelly (yellow card) 84' (goal) 90+1'; Caputo (yellow card) 90+3'	Stadium: ONE Spokane Stadium; Attendance: 2,444; Referee: Servando Berna Rico

March 22 2	Spokane Velocity	0–1	FC Naples	Spokane, Washington
4:00 PM PDT	Peláez (yellow card) 57'	Report	Henderlong 55'; Delgado (yellow card) 90+1'	Stadium: ONE Spokane Stadium; Attendance: 1,903; Referee: Robert Vincze

March 29 3	Greenville Triumph SC	0–4	Spokane Velocity	Greenville, South Carolina
4:00 PM PDT	Evans (yellow card) 36'; Castro (yellow card) 56'	Report	Gil 11', 27'; Miller (yellow card) 35'; Lewis (yellow card) 45+5'; Veidman (yellow card) 48'; Peláez 73', 83'	Stadium: Paladin Stadium; Attendance: 3,450; Referee: Amin Hadzic

April 5 4	Spokane Velocity	0–0	Portland Hearts of Pine	Spokane, Washington
6:00 PM PDT	Peláez (yellow card) 45+1'	Report	Lopez (yellow card) 39'; Poon-Angeron (yellow card) 58'; Wright (yellow card) 90'	Stadium: ONE Spokane Stadium; Attendance: 2,081; Referee: Alex Beehler

April 13 5	Spokane Velocity	4–1	Texoma FC	Spokane, Washington
3:00 PM PDT	Waldeck 13'; John-Brown 55'; Peláez 62'; Jome 75'; Denton (yellow card) 86'	Report	Spengler (yellow card) 44' (goal) 60'; Padilla (yellow card) 64'; Perkins (yellow card) 67'	Stadium: ONE Spokane Stadium; Attendance: 1,755; Referee: Patricia McCracken

April 19 6	AV Alta FC	1–2	Spokane Velocity	Lancaster, California
7:30 PM PDT	Lay (yellow card) 18'; Blancas 62'	Report	Denton 37'; Gil 43' (yellow card) 86'; John-Brown (yellow card) 45'; Merancio (yellow card) 60'; Opara (yellow card) 64'	Stadium: Lancaster Municipal Stadium; Attendance: 4,154; Referee: Juma Abdu-Razzaq

May 4 7	Spokane Velocity	3–1	Westchester SC	Spokane, Washington
4:00 PM PDT	Reedy 44'; Peláez (yellow card) 45+1' (goal) 49'; Jome 63'	Report	Powder 9' (yellow card) 77'; McGlynn (yellow card) 23'; Powder (yellow card) 42'; Jacomen (yellow card) 49'; Pierre (yellow card) 57'	Stadium: ONE Spokane Stadium; Attendance: 2,146; Referee: Mark Verso

May 10 8	South Georgia Tormenta FC	0–1	Spokane Velocity	Statesboro, Georgia
4:30 PM PDT		Report	Peláez 22' (pen.); Waldeck (yellow card) 56'; Veidman (yellow card) 77'; Gil (yellow card) 90+6'	Stadium: Tormenta Stadium; Attendance: 378; Referee: Alejo Calume

May 18 9	Spokane Velocity	1–0	Richmond Kickers	Spokane, Washington
4:00 PM PDT	Miller (red card) 13'; Peláez 44'; Merancio (yellow card) 89'	Report	Terzaghi (yellow card) 15'; Kanagwa (yellow card) 54'	Stadium: ONE Spokane Stadium; Attendance: 2,644; Referee: Calin Radosav

June 7 10	AV Alta FC	0–0	Spokane Velocity	Lancaster, California
8:00 PM PDT	Cruz (yellow card) 13'; Alassane (yellow card) 90+5'	Report	García (yellow card) 22'; Fernandez (yellow card) 89'	Stadium: Lancaster Municipal Stadium; Attendance: 3,507; Referee: Corbyn May

June 11 11	Spokane Velocity	1–1	Charlotte Independence	Spokane, Washington
7:00 PM PDT	Gil 53'	Report	Chaney 20'	Stadium: ONE Spokane Stadium; Attendance: 2,482; Referee: Rodrigo Albuquerque

June 14 12	Spokane Velocity	2–1	Forward Madison FC	Spokane, Washington
7:00 PM PDT	Reedy (yellow card) 13' (goal) 57'; John-Brown 22'; Veidman (yellow card) 90+3'; García (yellow card) 90+6'	Report	Garcia (yellow card) 67'; Mehl (yellow card) 72'	Stadium: ONE Spokane Stadium; Attendance: 2,572; Referee: Rodrigo Albuquerque

June 21 13	Richmond Kickers	0–1	Spokane Velocity	Richmond, Virginia
4:00 PM PDT	Terzaghi (yellow card) 32'; Billhardt (yellow card) 84'	Report	Brett (yellow card) 45' (goal) 46'; Reedy (yellow card) 53'; Miller (yellow card) 74'; Denton (yellow card) 76'	Stadium: City Stadium; Attendance: 3,879

July 2 14	Spokane Velocity	1–1	Texoma FC	Spokane, Washington
7:00 PM PDT	Vinyals 45+2'; Lewis (yellow card) 90+4'; Waldeck (yellow card) 90+6'	Report	Bortniczuk (yellow card) 28'; Ramos (yellow card) 44'; Bortniczuk 64'; Garcia (yellow card) 68'; Pepi (yellow card) 90+1'; Clarvis (yellow card) 90+4'; Spengler (yellow card) 90+6'	Stadium: ONE Spokane Stadium; Attendance: 2,436; Referee: Ryan Farrell

July 16 15	Westchester SC	3–0	Spokane Velocity	Mount Vernon, New York
4:00 PM PDT	Mackic 22'; Payne (yellow card) 64'; Obregón 66'; Tetteh (yellow card) 85'; Palma (yellow card) 90+2'	Report	Peláez 14' (pen.), 70' (pen.); Jacomen 48' (o.g.)	Stadium: The Stadium at Memorial Field; Referee: Joe Surgan
Note: Match was a 3-0 forfeit because Spokane used an inelligble player.

July 19 16	Chattanooga Red Wolves SC	3–0	Spokane Velocity	East Ridge, Tennessee
4:00 PM PDT	Lelin 4'; Knapp (yellow card) 18'; Tapia (yellow card) 32'; Hernandez 38'; Vazquez 48' (yellow card) 60'	Report	John-Brown (yellow card) 54'	Stadium: CHI Memorial Stadium; Attendance: 2,038; Referee: John Matto

August 2 17	Spokane Velocity	2–1	Union Omaha	Spokane, Washington
7:00 PM PDT	Vinyals 6'; John-Brown (yellow card) 29'; Veidman (yellow card) 43'; Peláez 45+3'; García (yellow card) 52'	Report	Kallman (yellow card) 5'; Schneider (yellow card) 42'; Ostrem (yellow card) 58'; Ors (yellow card) 62'; Gallardo 86' (pen.)	Stadium: ONE Spokane Stadium; Attendance: 1,680; Referee: Ivan de Cristofaro

August 9 18	Spokane Velocity	2–0	AV Alta FC	Spokane, Washington
7:00 PM PDT	Vinyals 14'; Garcia 51'; Opara (yellow card) 90+1'	Report	Blancas (yellow card) 45+1'; Alaribe (yellow card) 70'; Pehlivanov (yellow card) 86'	Stadium: ONE Spokane Stadium; Attendance: 2,848; Referee: Drew Klemp

August 21 19	Forward Madison FC	0–1	Spokane Velocity	Madison, Wisconsin
5:00 PM PDT	Chilaka (yellow card) 15'; Boyce (yellow card) 84'	Report	Peláez 37'; Gil (yellow card) 85'	Stadium: Breese Stevens Field; Attendance: 3,689; Referee: Kyle Armstrong

August 30 20	One Knoxville SC	1–0	Spokane Velocity	Knoxville, Tennessee
5:00 PM EST	Calixtro 24'; Fuller (yellow card) 42'; Johnson (yellow card) 44'; Lewis (yellow card) 90+1'	Report	Peláez (yellow card) 54'	Stadium: Covenant Health Park; Attendance: 3,050; Referee: Alejo Calume

September 7 21	Spokane Velocity	2–1	Westchester SC	Spokane, Washington
4:00 PM PDT	Lewis 40'; Crisler 59'; Waldeck (yellow card) 66'	Report	Pierre (yellow card) 4'; Obregón 36'; Palma (yellow card) 45+3'; Okiyoshi (yellow card) 64'; Bouman (yellow card) 90+4'	Stadium: ONE Spokane Stadium; Attendance: 2,295; Referee: Corbyn May

September 13 22	Texoma FC	3–3	Spokane Velocity	Sherman, Texas
5:00 PM PDT	McManus 15', 50'; Spengler (yellow card) 30' (goal) 35'; Calfo (yellow card) 37'; Forbes (yellow card) 83'	Report	Brett 26'; Waldeck (yellow card) 41'; Gil 45'; Fernandez (yellow card) 57'; Crisler 65'; Veidman (yellow card) 90+4'	Stadium: Historic Bearcat Stadium; Attendance: 1,276; Referee: Melvin Rivas

September 17 23	Union Omaha	2–2	Spokane Velocity	Papillion, Nebraska
5:00 PM PDT	Schneider (yellow card) 40'; Ors 88', 90+1'	Report	Brett 2'; Jome (yellow card) 32'; Opara (yellow card) 57'; Meredith (yellow card) 62'; Veidman (yellow card) 63'; John-Brown 76'	Stadium: Werner Park; Attendance: 1,499; Referee: Joe Surga

September 21 24	Spokane Velocity	1–2	Chattanooga Red Wolves SC	Spokane, Washington
4:00 PM PDT	Fernandez (yellow card) 53'; Brett 62'; Opara (yellow card) 86'	Report	Ualefi (yellow card) 18'; Acosta 67' (yellow card) 90+3'; Jnohope 88'	Stadium: ONE Spokane Stadium; Attendance: 2,580; Referee: Jaclyn Metz

September 27 25	Spokane Velocity	0–1	Greenville Triumph SC	Spokane, Washington
6:00 PM PDT	Fernandez (yellow card) 65'	Report	Herrera 38' (pen.); Marsh (yellow card) 61'; Fricke (yellow card) 84'	Stadium: ONE Spokane Stadium; Attendance: 2,644; Referee: Justin St. Pierre

October 3 26	Charlotte Independence	0–1	Spokane Velocity	Charlotte, North Carolina
4:00 PM PDT	Sorenson (yellow card) 45'; Ciss (yellow card) 74'; Moshobane (yellow card) 76'; Spielman (yellow card) 86'; Adewole (yellow card) 90+3'; Chaney (yellow card) 90+5'	Report	Miller (yellow card) 23' (yellow-red card) 34'; Veidman (yellow card) 36'; Reedy 87'	Stadium: American Legion Memorial Stadium; Attendance: 638; Referee: Aleksandar Zhelyazkov

October 11 27	Spokane Velocity	1–1	South Georgia Tormenta FC	Spokane, Washington
6:00 PM PDT	Gil 52' (pen.); Crisler (yellow card) 52'; Fernandez (yellow card) 89'; Veidman (yellow card) 90'	Report	Reid-Stephen 39'; Pack (yellow card) 52'; Cabral (yellow card) 52'; Alves (yellow card) 73'	Stadium: ONE Spokane Stadium; Attendance: 2,694; Referee: Mark Verso

October 18 28	FC Naples	0–1	Spokane Velocity	Naples, Florida
4:00 PM PDT	Ferrín (yellow card) 32'; Heckenberg (yellow card) 90+5'	Report	Gil 87'; Akale (yellow card) 90+6'	Stadium: Paradise Coast Sports Complex; Attendance: 3,572; Referee: Richonne Clark

October 21 29	Portland Hearts of Pine	6–1	Spokane Velocity	Portland, Maine
3:30 PM PDT	James 18', 43'; O. Wright 35' (pen.); Messer 45+3'; Washington 59'; Kamara 67'	Report	Brett 41'; García (yellow card) 63'	Stadium: Fitzpatrick Stadium; Attendance: 6,440; Referee: Calin Radosav

October 25 30	Union Omaha	2–2	Spokane Velocity	Papillion, Nebraska
4:00 PM PDT	Schneider (yellow card) 25' (goal) 41'; Becher 30'; Acoff (yellow card) 36'; Kallman (yellow card) 88'	Report	Hernández 5'; Reedy (yellow card) 32'; Peláez 80'; Gil (yellow card) 90'	Stadium: Werner Park; Attendance: 3,607; Referee: Muhammad Hassan

=== Playoffs ===
November 2 Quarterfinals	Spokane Velocity	1–1 (a.e.t.) (4–3 p)	South Georgia Tormenta FC	Spokane, Washington
5:00 PM PDT	Lewis (yellow card) 17'; Veidman (yellow card) 74'; Garcia (yellow card) 92'; Reedy (yellow card) 99'; Peláez 115' (pen.)	Report	Cabral (yellow card) 90'; Tunbridge 95' (pen.) (yellow card) 107'; Pack (yellow card) 114'	Stadium: ONE Spokane Stadium; Attendance: 2,852; Referee: Gerald Flores
	Penalties
	Vinyals (penalty scored); Hernández (penalty scored); Peláez (penalty scored); Garcia (penalty scored)		(penalty scored) Walker; (penalty scored) Alves; (penalty scored) Reid-Stephen; (penalty missed) Tunbridge; (penalty missed) Cabral

November 8 Semifinals	Spokane Velocity	2–2 (a.e.t.) (6–5 p)	Portland Hearts of Pine	Spokane, Washington
6:00 PM PDT	Gil 45'; Miller (yellow card) 90+1'; Lewis (yellow card) 90+1'; Vinyals 120+1'; Hernandez (yellow card) 120+4'	Report	Wright 53' (yellow card) 70'; Green (yellow card) 60'; Kamara (yellow card) 90+6' (goal) 92'	Stadium: ONE Spokane Stadium; Attendance: 2,680; Referee: Elvis Osmanovic
	Penalties
	Vinyals (penalty scored); Peláez (penalty scored); Lewis (penalty missed); Hernandez (penalty scored); García (penalty scored); Miller (penalty scored); Crisler (penalty scored)		(penalty scored) Keegan; (penalty scored) Coulibaly; (penalty scored) Liadi; (penalty scored) Wada; (penalty missed) Kamara; (penalty scored) Messer; (penalty missed) Poon-Angeron

November 16 Championship	One Knoxville SC	2–0	Spokane Velocity	Knoxville, Tennessee
2:00 PM PDT	Rosamilia 4'; Tekiela 54' (pen.); Caputo (yellow card) 66'; Diene (yellow card) 72'	Report		Stadium: Covenant Health Park; Attendance: 7,500; Referee: Brandon Stevis

=== Lamar Hunt US Open Cup ===
March 19 First Round	Ballard FC	0–1 (a.e.t.)	Spokane Velocity	Seattle, Washington
7:30 PM PDT	Dale (yellow card) 24'; Mungomba (yellow card) 65'; Mejía (yellow card) 114'	Report	Meredith (yellow card) 28'; García (yellow card) 42'; Peláez 120+1'	Stadium: Interbay Stadium; Attendance: 1,508; Referee: Kelsey Harms

April 2 Second Round	Tacoma Defiance	2–1 (a.e.t.)	Spokane Velocity	Tukwila, Washington
7:00 PM PDT	Kang 3'; Hawkins (yellow card) 30'; Lage 99' (o.g.)	Report	Hernández (yellow card) 17'; Meredith (yellow card) 40'; Miller (yellow card) 61'; Gil 78'	Stadium: Starfire Sports Complex; Attendance: 2,300; Referee: Christopher Calderon

=== USL Cup ===
April 27 Group Stage	Spokane Velocity	2–1	Oakland Roots SC	Spokane, Washington
4:00 PM PDT	Gil 25'; Peláez 43' (yellow card) 45'; Merancio (yellow card) 69'	Report	Greene (yellow card) 45+2'; Margvelashvili 52'	Stadium: ONE Spokane Stadium; Attendance: 2,205; Referee: Brad Jensen

May 28 Group Stage	Monterey Bay FC	1–0	Spokane Velocity	Seaside, California
7:00 PM PDT	Gallaway 4'; Søjberg (yellow card) 57'; Robinson (yellow card) 71'; Gomez (yellow card) 90+6'	Report	Denton (yellow card) 7'; Vinyals (yellow card) 22'	Stadium: Cardinale Stadium; Attendance: 2,014; Referee: Brandon Stevis

June 28 Group Stage	Las Vegas Lights FC	2–0	Spokane Velocity	Las Vegas, Nevada
7:30 PM PDT	Stojanovic 35' (pen.); Pickering 51'; Smart (yellow card) 83'	Report	Veidman (yellow card) 45+2'; Denton (yellow card) 85'	Stadium: Cashman Field; Attendance: 2,597; Referee: Servando Berna Rico

July 26 Group Stage	Spokane Velocity	0–1	Sacramento Republic FC	Spokane, Washington
7:00 PM PDT	Miller (yellow card) 49'	Report	Benítez 10'; Kleemann (yellow card) 61'; Willey (yellow card) 82'	Stadium: ONE Spokane Stadium; Attendance: 3,068; Referee: Brad Jensen

== Statistics ==
=== Appearances and goals ===
No.	Pos	Nat	Player	Total		USL League One		Lamar Hunt US Open Cup		USL Cup		USL League One Playoffs	
No.	Pos	Nat	Player	Apps	Goals	Apps	Goals	Apps	Goals	Apps	Goals	Apps	Goals
1	GK	(United States) USA	Ryan Bilichuk	5	0	1+0	0	2+0	0	2+0	0	0+0	0
2	DF	(Spain) ESP	Javier Martín Gil	25	0	6+11	0	1+1	0	2+1	0	0+3	0
3	DF	(United States) USA	Jalen Crisler	16	2	9+4	2	1+0	0	0+0	0	0+2	0
4	DF	(Spain) ESP	Davíd Garcia	36	1	25+2	1	1+1	0	4+0	0	3+0	0
5	DF	(United States) USA	Marcelo Lage	13	0	6+5	0	1+0	0	0+1	0	0+0	0
6	MF	(Peru) PER	Collin Fernandez	30	0	18+7	0	1+1	0	2+1	0	0+0	0
7	MF	(United States) USA	Masango Akale	31	0	6+19	0	1+1	0	1+3	0	0+0	0
8	MF	(Spain) ESP	Nil Vinyals	34	4	11+15	3	2+0	0	1+2	0	1+2	1
9	FW	(Jamaica) JAM	Neco Brett	33	5	12+13	5	1+0	0	2+2	0	3+0	0
10	MF	(United States) USA	Luis Gil	38	10	25+4	7	0+2	1	4+0	1	3+0	1
11	MF	(United States) USA	Pierre Reedy	22	3	14+3	3	1+0	0	2+0	0	2+0	0
12	DF	(United States) USA	Camron Miller	31	1	20+3	1	1+0	0	4+0	0	3+0	0
13	DF	(Nigeria) NGR	Lucky Opara	33	0	23+3	0	1+0	0	2+1	0	3+0	0
14	MF	(United States) USA	Mark Hernández	12	1	1+5	1	2+0	0	0+1	0	0+3	0
15	DF	(The Gambia) GAM	Ismaila Jome	29	2	13+10	2	2+0	0	3+1	0	0+0	0
16	FW	(Colombia) COL	Anuar Peláez	35	12	17+9	9	1+1	1	2+2	1	0+3	1
17	FW	(Grenada) GRN	Shavon John-Brown	30	3	19+3	3	0+2	0	2+1	0	3+0	0
18	DF	(United States) USA	Derek Waldeck	34	1	27+0	1	0+1	0	3+0	0	3+0	0
19	MF	(England) ENG	Jack Denton	23	1	9+7	1	1+0	0	2+1	0	0+3	0
22	FW	(United States) USA	Rocky Wells	1	0	0+0	0	0+0	0	0+1	0	0+0	0
23	GK	(Mexico) MEX	Carlos Merancio	33	0	28+0	0	0+0	0	2+0	0	3+0	0
37	GK	(United States) USA	Jackson Buck	0	0	0+0	0	0+0	0	0+0	0	0+0	0
42	DF	(United States) USA	Bryce Meredith	22	0	3+12	0	2+0	0	0+2	0	3+0	0
77	MF	(Jamaica) JAM	Andre Lewis	37	1	27+2	1	0+1	0	4+0	0	3+0	0

=== Top goalscorers ===
Rank	Position	Number	Name	USL1 Season	U.S. Open Cup	USL Cup	USL League One Playoffs	Total
1	FW	16	(Colombia) Anuar Peláez	9	1	1	1	12
2	MF	10	(United States) Luis Gil	7	1	1	1	10
3	FW	9	(Jamaica) Neco Brett	5	0	0	0	5
4	MF	8	(Spain) Nil Vinyals	3	0	0	1	4
5	DF	11	(United States) Pierre Reedy	3	0	0	0	3
5	FW	17	(Grenada) Shavon John-Brown	3	0	0	0	3
7	DF	3	(United States) Jalen Crisler	2	0	0	0	2
7	DF	15	(The Gambia) Ismaila Jome	2	0	0	0	2
9	DF	9	(Spain) Davíd Garcia	1	0	0	0	1
9	DF	12	(United States) Camron Miller	1	0	0	0	1
9	MF	14	(United States) Mark Hernández	1	0	0	0	1
9	DF	18	(United States) Derek Waldeck	1	0	0	0	1
9	DF	19	(England) Jack Denton	1	0	0	0	1
9	MF	77	(Jamaica) Andre Lewis	1	0	0	0	1
9	Own goal			1	0	0	0	1
Total				41	2	2	3	48

=== Assist scorers ===
Rank	Position	Number	Name	USL1 Season	U.S. Open Cup	USL Cup	USL League One Playoffs	Total
1	DF	13	(Nigeria) Lucky Opara	4	0	0	0	4
1	MF	8	(Spain) Nil Vinyals	3	1	0	0	4
3	MF	10	(United States) Luis Gil	3	0	0	0	3
3	DF	11	(United States) Pierre Reedy	3	0	0	0	3
3	FW	17	(Grenada) Shavon John-Brown	3	0	0	0	3
3	FW	9	(Jamaica) Neco Brett	2	1	0	0	3
3	MF	77	(Jamaica) Andre Lewis	2	0	1	0	3
8	DF	2	(Spain) Javier Martín Gil	2	0	0	0	2
8	FW	16	(Colombia) Anuar Peláez	2	0	0	0	2
8	DF	18	(United States) Derek Waldeck	1	0	1	0	2
11	DF	4	(Spain) Davíd Garcia	1	0	0	0	1
11	MF	7	(United States) Masango Akale	1	0	0	0	1
11	DF	15	(The Gambia) Ismaila Jome	1	0	0	0	1
11	MF	14	(The Gambia) Marky Hernandez	0	0	0	1	1
Total				28	2	2	1	33

=== Clean sheets ===
Rank	Name	Number	USL1 Season	U.S. Open Cup	USL Cup	USL1 Playoffs	Total
1	(Mexico) Carlos Merancio	23	8	0	0	0	8
2	(United States) Ryan Bilichuk	1	0	1	0	0	1
Total			8	1	0	0	9

=== Disciplinary record ===
No.	Pos.	Player	USL League One Regular Season			Lamar Hunt US Open Cup			USL Cup			USL League One Playoffs			Total		
No.	Pos.	Player	Yellow card	(yellow card) (yellow-red card)	Red card	Yellow card	(yellow card) (yellow-red card)	Red card	Yellow card	(yellow card) (yellow-red card)	Red card	Yellow card	(yellow card) (yellow-red card)	Red card	Yellow card	(yellow card) (yellow-red card)	Red card
1	GK	(United States) Ryan Bilichuk	0	0	0	0	0	0	0	0	0	0	0	0	0	0	0
2	DF	(Spain) Javier Martín Gil	1	0	0	0	0	0	0	0	0	0	0	0	1	0	0
3	DF	(United States) Jalen Crisler	1	0	0	0	0	0	0	0	0	0	0	0	1	0	0
4	DF	(Spain) Davíd Garcia	4	0	0	1	0	0	0	0	0	1	0	0	6	0	0
5	DF	(United States) Marcelo Lage	0	0	0	0	0	0	0	0	0	0	0	0	0	0	0
6	MF	(Peru) Collin Fernandez	5	0	0	0	0	0	0	0	0	0	0	0	5	0	0
7	MF	(United States) Masango Akale	1	0	0	0	0	0	0	0	0	0	0	0	1	0	0
8	MF	(Spain) Nil Vinyals	0	0	0	0	0	0	1	0	0	0	0	0	0	0	0
9	FW	(Jamaica) Neco Brett	1	0	0	0	0	0	0	0	0	0	0	0	1	0	0
10	MF	(United States) Luis Gil	3	0	0	0	0	0	0	0	0	0	0	0	3	0	0
11	MF	(United States) Pierre Reedy	3	0	0	0	0	0	0	0	0	1	0	0	4	0	0
12	DF	(United States) Camron Miller	4	1	1	1	0	0	1	0	0	1	0	0	7	1	1
13	DF	(Nigeria) Lucky Opara	4	0	0	0	0	0	0	0	0	0	0	0	4	0	0
14	MF	(United States) Mark Hernández	0	0	0	1	0	0	0	0	0	1	0	0	2	0	0
15	DF	(The Gambia) Ismaila Jome	1	0	0	0	0	0	0	0	0	0	0	0	1	0	0
16	MF	(Colombia) Anuar Peláez	4	0	0	0	0	0	1	0	0	0	0	0	5	0	0
17	FW	(Grenada) Shavon John-Brown	3	0	0	0	0	0	0	0	0	0	0	0	3	0	0
18	DF	(United States) Derek Waldeck	4	0	0	0	0	0	0	0	0	0	0	0	4	0	0
19	MF	(England) Jack Denton	2	0	0	0	0	0	2	0	0	0	0	0	3	0	0
23	GK	(Mexico) Carlos Merancio	3	0	0	0	0	0	1	0	0	0	0	0	4	0	0
42	DF	(United States) Bryce Meredith	1	0	0	2	0	0	0	0	0	0	0	0	3	0	0
77	MF	(Jamaica) Andre Lewis	2	0	0	0	0	0	0	0	0	2	0	0	4	0	0
	Head Coach	(England) Leigh Veidman	8	0	0	0	0	0	1	0	0	1	0	0	10	0	0
Total			55	1	1	5	0	0	7	0	0	7	0	0	74	1	1

== Awards and honors ==
=== USL League One Player of the Month ===
Month	Player	Position	Ref
April	(Colombia) Anuar Peláez	FW	

=== USL League One Player of the Week ===
Week	Player	Opponent	Position	Ref
4	(Nigeria) Lucky Opara	Greenville Triumph SC	DF	
9	(United States) Pierre Reedy	Westchester SC	MF	
28	(Jamaica) Neco Brett	Texoma FC	FW	
31	(Mexico) Carlos Merancio	Charlotte Independence	GK	

=== USL League One Team of the Week ===
Week	Player	Opponent	Position	Ref
2	(United States) Camron Miller	One Knoxville SC	DF	
2	(United States) Derek Waldeck	One Knoxville SC	DF	
3	(United States) Derek Waldeck	FC Naples	DF	
3	(United States) Camron Miller	FC Naples	Bench	
4	(Mexico) Carlos Merancio	Greenville Triumph SC	GK	
4	(United States) Lucky Opara	Greenville Triumph SC	DF	
4	(United States) Luis Gil	Greenville Triumph SC	MF	
4	(Colombia) Anuar Peláez	Greenville Triumph SC	FW	
4	(England) Leigh Veidman	Greenville Triumph SC	Coach	
4	(Grenada) Shavon John-Brown	Greenville Triumph SC	Bench	
5	(Spain) Davíd Garcia	Portland Hearts of Pine	DF	
5	(Grenada) Shavon John-Brown	Portland Hearts of Pine	Bench	
5	(Peru) Collin Fernandez	Portland Hearts of Pine	Bench	
6	(United States) Derek Waldeck	Texoma FC	DF	
6	(Grenada) Shavon John-Brown	Texoma FC	MF	
6	(Nigeria) Lucky Opara	Texoma FC	Bench	
6	(Jamaica) Andre Lewis	Texoma FC	Bench	
6	(Colombia) Anuar Peláez	Texoma FC	Bench	
7	(Mexico) Carlos Merancio	AV Alta FC	GK	
7	(United States) Luis Gil	AV Alta FC	MF	
7	(England) Jack Denton	AV Alta FC	Bench	
9	(Mexico) Carlos Merancio	Westchester SC	GK	
9	(United States) Pierre Reedy	Westchester SC	MF	
9	(England) Leigh Veidman	Westchester SC	Coach	
10	(United States) Derek Waldeck	South Georgia Tormenta FC	Bench	
10	(Colombia) Anuar Peláez	South Georgia Tormenta FC	Bench	
11	(Spain) Davíd Garcia	Richmond Kickers	DF	
15	(United States) Luis Gil	Charlotte Independence	Bench	
15	(Grenada) Shavon John-Brown	Forward Madison FC	Bench	
16	(Nigeria) Lucky Opara	Richmond Kickers	Bench	
16	(Jamaica) Neco Brett	Richmond Kickers	Bench	
17/18	(Spain) Nil Vinyals	Texoma FC	MF	
21/22	(Spain) Nil Vinyals	Union Omaha	MF	
21/22	(Colombia) Anuar Peláez	Union Omaha	Bench	
23	(Spain) David García	AV Alta FC	DF	
23	(Spain) Nil Vinyals	AV Alta FC	MF	
23	(Mexico) Carlos Merancio	AV Alta FC	Bench	
27	(Nigeria) Lucky Opara	Westchester SC	DF	
28	(United States) Jalen Crisler	Texoma FC	DF	
28	(Jamaica) Neco Brett	Texoma FC	FW	
28	(United States) Luis Gil	Texoma FC	FW	
28	(Jamaica) Andre Lewis	Texoma FC	Bench	
30	(United States) Camron Miller	Greenville Triumph SC	DF	
31	(Mexico) Carlos Merancio	Charlotte Independence	GK	
31	(Grenada) Shavon John-Brown	Charlotte Independence	Bench	
31	(United States) Pierre Reedy	Charlotte Independence	Bench	
32	(United States) Luis Gil	South Georgia Tormenta FC	FW	
33	(United States) Luis Gil	FC Naples	Bench	

=== USL Cup Team of the Round ===
Matchday	Player	Opponent	Position	Ref
11	(Spain) Davíd Garcia	Monterey Bay FC	DF	

=== USL League One Annual Awards ===
==== USL League One Midseason Awards ====
Player	Award	Position	Ref
(England) Leigh Veidman	Coach of the Year	Head Coach	
(Colombia) Anuar Peláez	Player of the Year	FW	

==== USL League One All-League Team honorees ====
Player	Team	Position	Ref
(Spain) Davíd Garcia	First	DF	
(United States) Luis Gil	First	MF	
(Mexico) Carlos Merancio	Second	GK	
