= Marcelo Lage =

American soccer player (born 2000)

Personal information
- Full name: Marcelo Antonio Lage
- Date of birth: March 2, 2000 (age 26)
- Place of birth: Middleton, Massachusetts, United States
- Height: 1.96 m (6 ft 5 in)
- Position: Defender

Team information
- Current team: New York Cosmos
- Number: 4

Youth career
- –2016: Global Premier Soccer
- 2016–2017: New England Revolution
- 2017–2018: Boston Bolts

College career
Years	Team	Apps	(Gls)
2018	George Washington Colonials	17	(1)
2019–2021	Coastal Carolina Chanticleers	43	(8)
2022	Hofstra Pride	21	(3)

Senior career*
Years	Team	Apps	(Gls)
2021	Chicago FC United	1	(0)
2022	Boston Bolts	10	(0)
2023	Las Vegas Lights	25	(4)
2024–2025	Spokane Velocity	30	(0)
2025	Richmond Kickers	16	(2)
2026–	New York Cosmos	0	(0)
- * Club domestic league appearances and goals as of October 31, 2025

Marcelo Antonio Lage (born March 2, 2000) is an American professional soccer player who plays as a defender for New York Cosmos in the USL League One.

== Career ==
=== Youth, college and amateur ===
Lage was born in Middleton, Massachusetts. He attended Brooks School, where he earned All-State honors as a senior in helping the team win Independent School League, New England and National Prep titles. Lage garnered All-ISL honors in 2016 and 2017, and was a two-time selection to New England Prep All-Star Team. Lage also played club soccer with GPS, New England Revolution, and Boston Bolts.

In 2018, Lage attended George Washington University to play college soccer. He played one season with the Colonials, making 17 appearances and scoring one goal, whilst also been named to the Atlantic 10 All-Rookie Team. In 2019, Lage transferred to Coastal Carolina University, where he played a further three seasons at the college level. He scored eight goals and tallied two assists in 43 appearances for the Chanticleers. He was named to the Sun Belt Conference Championship All-Tournament Team in 2020, Academic All-District First Team for the 2020–21 and 2021 seasons, and All-Conference USA Third Team in 2021. Lage also attended Hofstra University as a graduate student in 2022, playing 21 games and scoring three goals for Hofstra Pride. He was an All-CAA honoree in his single season at Hofstra.

During his time at college, Lage also played in the USL League Two. He made a single appearance for Chicago FC United in 2021, and played ten times for his former academy side Boston Bolts in 2022.

=== Las Vegas Lights ===
Lage was eligible for the 2023 MLS draft however went undrafted. On March 7, 2023, Lage signed his first professional contract with USL Championship side Las Vegas Lights ahead of their 2023 season. He made his professional debut in a 1–1 draw with Rio Grande Valley FC on March 12, 2023. On May 20, 2023, Lage scored his first goal as a professional in a 4-1 loss to Pittsburgh Riverhounds. Lage ended his first season as a professional appearing in 27 matches and scoring 4 goals.

=== Spokane Velocity ===
On January 12, 2024, Lage joined Spokane Velocity ahead of their inaugural season in the USL League One. Lage played in 24 league matches for Spokane in their first year, with 23 starts, helping the first year club to finish as the 2024 USL League One Runners up. While with Spokane, Lage made 46 appearances for the club.

=== Richmond Kickers ===
Lage moved to USL League One side Richmond Kickers on July 10, 2025, two days following his release from Spokane. He quickly established himself as a regular starter for Richmond. On August 23, 2025, Lage scored his first goal for Richmond, a header off a corner, to help lead the Kickers to a 1-0 victory over One Knoxville SC. On October 25, 2025, he scored his second goal of the season, again on a header off a corner, in a 5-1 victory for Richmond over Forward Madison. He would leave the club at the end of the season finishing with 16 appearances and two goals in USL League One.

=== New York Cosmos ===
On December 12, 2025, Lage joined USL League One side New York Cosmos ahead of their return to professional competition.

== Career statistics ==
As of match played 24 December 2025

Appearances and goals by club, season and competition
Club	Season	League			National cup		League cup		Other		Total	
Club	Season	Division	Apps	Goals	Apps	Goals	Apps	Goals	Apps	Goals	Apps	Goals
Chicago FC United	2021	USL League Two	1	0	0	0	—		0	0	1	0
Boston Bolts	2022	USL League Two	10	0	0	0	—		0	0	10	0
Las Vegas Lights	2023	USL Championship	25	4	2	0	0	0	0	0	27	4
Spokane Velocity	2024	USL League One	21	0	2	0	8	0	3 (Note: Appearances in USL Playoffs)	0	34	0
Spokane Velocity	2025	USL League One	9	0	2	0	1	0	0	0	12	0
Spokane Velocity	Total		30	0	4	0	9	0	3	0	46	0
Richmond Kickers	2025	USL League One	16	2	0	0	1	0	0	0	17	2
New York Cosmos	2026	USL League One	0	0	0	0	0	0	0	0	0	0
Career total			82	6	6	0	10	0	3	0	101	6
