= Brooks Thompson (soccer) =

American soccer player (born 2002)

Personal information
- Full name: Brooks Thompson
- Date of birth: May 28, 2002 (age 24)
- Place of birth: Jefferson, Indiana, United States
- Height: 6 ft 4 in (1.92 m)
- Position: Goalkeeper

Team information
- Current team: Lexington SC
- Number: 31

Youth career
- 2016–2018: IMG Academy
- 2018–2019: Sporting Kansas City

Senior career*
Years	Team	Apps	(Gls)
2017	Derby City Rovers	1	(0)
2019–2021	Sporting Kansas City II	12	(0)
2021	Sporting Kansas City	0	(0)
2022–2023	Philadelphia Union II	14	(0)
2023	→ North Carolina FC (loan)	15	(0)
2024	Hartford Athletic	0	(0)
2024	→ Spokane Velocity (loan)	15	(0)
2025–	Lexington SC	15	(0)
2026	→ FC Dallas (loan)	0	(0)
2026	→ North Texas SC (loan)	1	(0)
- * Club domestic league appearances and goals as of February 19, 2026

Brooks Thompson (born May 28, 2002) is an American professional soccer player who plays as a goalkeeper for Major League Soccer side FC Dallas on loan from Lexington SC in the USL Championship.

== Club career ==
Born in Jefferson, Indiana, Thompson was raised in Floyds Knobs. In 2016, Thompson joined the IMG Academy in Bradenton, Florida, playing in the U.S. Soccer Development Academy. The next year, during the summer of 2017, Thompson joined the squad of Premier Development League club Derby City Rovers. He made his debut for the side on June 30, 2017, against the Cincinnati Dutch Lions, starting in the 3–0 defeat. Later that year, Thompson joined the youth academy at Sporting Kansas City.

On March 7, 2019, Thompson signed with Swope Park Rangers, the reserve side of Sporting Kansas City in the USL Championship. He made his debut for the club on July 17, 2019, starting in a 4–3 victory against Hartford Athletic. During the 2020 season, Thompson started 6 matches, averaging 1.17 goals against. On August 4, 2020, Thompson was named into the USL Championship Team of the Week after keeping his first professional clean sheet during a 1–0 victory against Indy Eleven.

=== Sporting Kansas City ===
On January 20, 2021, Thompson signed a homegrown player deal for Major League Soccer club Sporting Kansas City. Following the 2021 season, Thompson's contract option was declined by Kansas City.

=== Philadelphia Union II ===
In March 2022, Thompson was announced as signing with Philadelphia Union II ahead of their first season competing in MLS Next Pro.

=== North Carolina FC ===
In July 2023, it was announced Thompson would be on loan to North Carolina FC for the remainder of the 2023 season.

=== Hartford Athletic ===
In January 2024, Thompson signed with Hartford Athletic of the USL Championship.

==== Loan to Spokane Velocity ====
In May 2024, Thompson signed on a season-long loan with Spokane Velocity FC in its inaugural season of the USL League One.

=== Lexington Sporting Club ===
On January 22, 2025, it was announced Thompson had been acquired via transfer by Lexington Sporting Club in USL Championship from Hartford Athletic.

=== FC Dallas ===
On February 17, 2026 Lexington SC announced they had loaned Thompson to MLS side FC Dallas through June 2026.

== Career statistics ==
As of match played March 10, 2022

Appearances and goals by club, season and competition
Club	Season	League			Cup		Continental		Total	
Club	Season	Division	Apps	Goals	Apps	Goals	Apps	Goals	Apps	Goals
Derby City Rovers	2017	Premier Development League	1	0	—		—		1	0
Sporting Kansas City II	2019	USL Championship	1	0	—		—		1	0
Sporting Kansas City II	2020	USL Championship	6	0	—		—		6	0
Sporting Kansas City II	Total		7	0	0	0	0	0	7	0
Sporting Kansas City	2021	Major League Soccer	0	0	0	0	—		0	0
Philadelphia Union II	2022	MLS Next Pro	9	0	0	0	—		9	0
Career total			17	0	0	0	0	0	17	0
