= Ahmed Longmire =

American soccer player

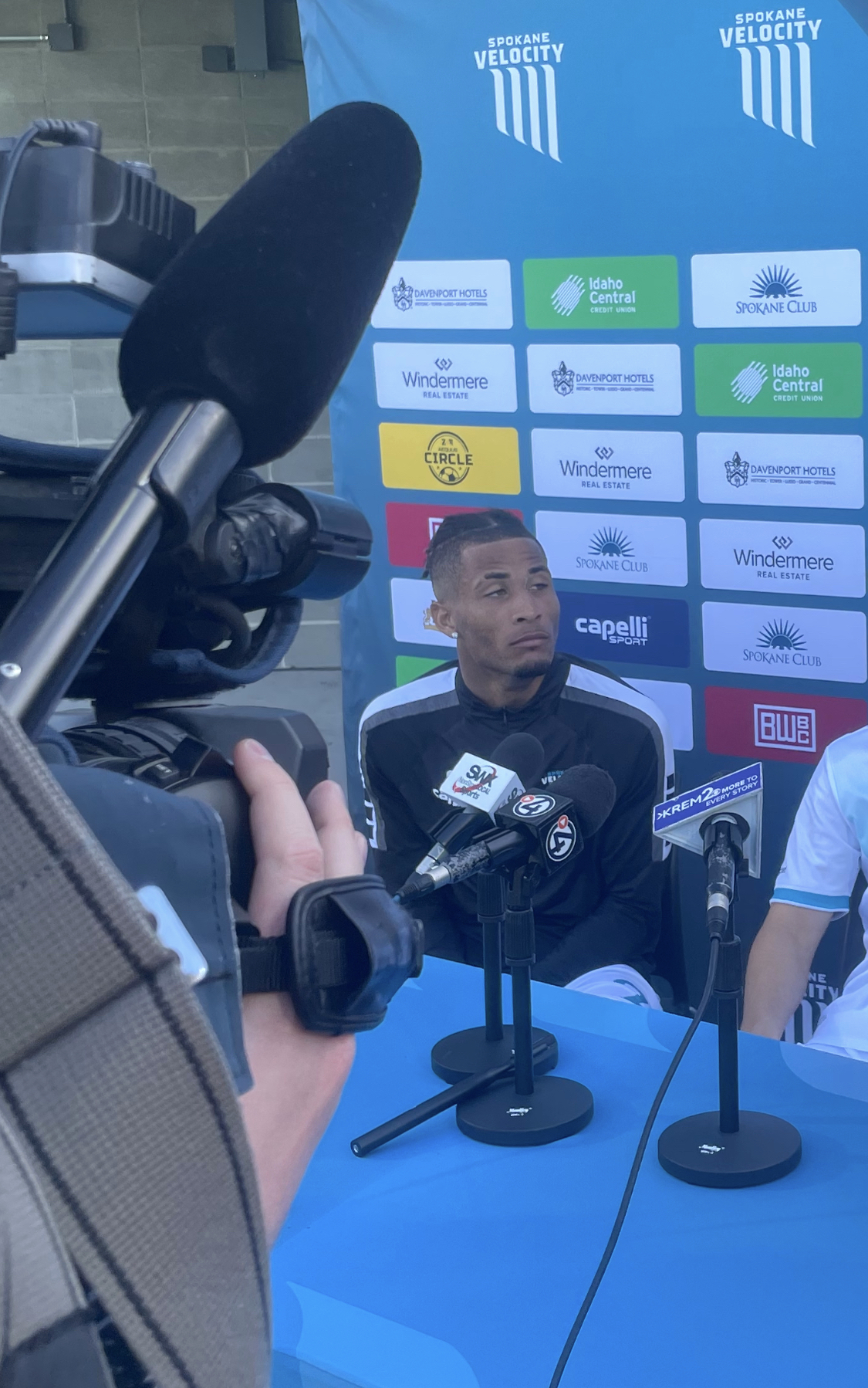
- Longmire with Spokane in 2024

Personal information
- Full name: Ahmed Akee Longmire
- Date of birth: October 11, 1999 (age 27)
- Place of birth: Las Vegas, Nevada, United States
- Height: 6 ft 3 in (1.91 m)
- Position: Defender

Youth career
- 2011–2017: Heat FC
- 2017–2018: Las Vegas Soccer Academy

College career
Years	Team	Apps	(Gls)
2018–2019	Utah Valley Wolverines	39	(0)
2020–2021	UCLA Bruins	20	(0)

Senior career*
Years	Team	Apps	(Gls)
2022–2023	Nashville SC	0	(0)
2022	→ Orange County SC (loan)	5	(0)
2023	Huntsville City FC	11	(0)
2024	Spokane Velocity	18	(3)
- * Club domestic league appearances and goals as of November 24, 2024

Ahmed Akee Longmire (born October 11, 1999) is an American professional soccer player who plays as a defender.

== Career ==
=== Youth and college ===
Longmire attended Centennial High School, also playing club soccer for six years with local side Heat FC, and a single year with the Las Vegas Soccer Academy.

In 2018, Longmire attended Utah Valley University to play college soccer. In two seasons with the Wolverines, Longmire made 39 appearances and tallied a single assist. His sophomore season saw him earn First-team All-WAC honors and was named to the United Soccer Coaches All-Far West Region third team. In 2020, Longmire transferred to the University of California, Los Angeles, going on to appear 20 times for the Bruins. Longmire was named 2020-21 Pac-12 All-Conference Second Team, and a 2021 Pac-12 All-Conference honorable mention.

=== Professional ===
On January 11, 2022, Longmire was selected 10th overall in the 2022 MLS SuperDraft by Nashville SC. Nashville traded up to pick Longmire, sending Colorado Rapids $125,000 in General Allocation Money, with a potential $50,000 added if Longmire reaches certain performance metrics, as well as the 26th overall pick.

On June 16, 2022, Longmire joined USL Championship side Orange County SC on loan. He made his debut on June 18, 2022, starting in a 3–1 loss at Louisville City. He left Nashville following the 2023 season.

On January 31, 2024, Longmire joined USL League One side Spokane Velocity for their inaugural season. In the club's first ever home game Longmire scored the game winning goal in the 15th minute. Spokane opted not to renew his contract following their 2024 season.
