= Luke Merrill =

American soccer player

Personal information
- Full name: Luke Merrill
- Date of birth: May 3, 2000 (age 26)
- Place of birth: Layton, Utah, United States
- Height: 5 ft 9 in (1.75 m)
- Positions: Full-back; winger

Team information
- Current team: Gandzasar Kapan
- Number: 17

Youth career
- 2009–2017: La Roca
- 2017–2018: Sparta United

College career
Years	Team	Apps	(Gls)
2018–2019	SLCC Bruins	30	(0)
2021–2022	Westminster Griffins	31	(10)

Senior career*
Years	Team	Apps	(Gls)
2021–2022	Salt City SC	10	(2)
2023	Hartford Athletic	26	(1)
2024	Salt City SC	7	(0)
2024	Spokane Velocity	7	(0)
2025–	Gandzasar Kapan	26	(3)
- * Club domestic league appearances and goals as of 11 December 2025

Luke Merrill (born May 3, 2000) is an American soccer player, who currently plays for Gandzasar Kapan in the Armenian Premier League.

== Career ==
=== Early career ===
Merrill attended Davis High School, playing club soccer with La Roca from under-10 to under-17 and a further year with Sparta United SC.

In 2018, Merrill attended Salt Lake Community College to play college soccer. In two seasons with the Bruins, Merrill made 30 appearances and added seven assists, earning All-Region Second Team honors in 2019. In 2021, Merrill transferred to Westminster College where he went on to make 31 appearances and scored ten goals and tallied three assists.

Whilst at college, Merrill also appeared in the USL League Two with Salt City SC in both 2021 and 2022, scoring two goals in ten games.

=== Professional ===
On 27 January 2023, Merrill signed his first professional contract, joining USL Championship side Hartford Athletic after impressing in a club combine. He made his debut on March 11, 2023, appearing as a 59th-minute substitute during a 5–3 loss away to Monterey Bay FC. On April 5, 2023, Merrill helped Hartford to the second round of the Lamar Hunt US Open Cup after they defeated amateur side Lansdowne Yonkers 3–0.

Following a stint back with Salt City SC during their 2024 season, Merrill signed with USL League One side Spokane Velocity on October 2, 2024. Spokane opted not to renew his contract following their 2024 season.
