= Grayson Dupont =

American soccer player (born 1998)

Personal information
- Date of birth: January 16, 1998 (age 28)
- Place of birth: Birmingham, Alabama, United States
- Height: 1.72 m (5 ft 8 in)
- Position: Midfielder

Youth career
- –2016: Montverde Academy

College career
Years	Team	Apps	(Gls)
2016–2018	New Mexico Lobos	17	(1)
2019–2021	UAB Blazers	25	(3)

Senior career*
Years	Team	Apps	(Gls)
2017	Albuquerque Sol	12	(1)
2018–2019	Brazos Valley Cavalry	8	(0)
2021	CD Almuñécar City	5	(0)
2022–2023	Birmingham Legion	20	(1)
2023	→ FC Cincinnati 2 (loan)	1	(0)
2024	Spokane Velocity	1	(0)
- * Club domestic league appearances and goals as of November 24, 2024

Grayson Dupont (born January 16, 1998) is an American professional soccer player who plays as a midfielder.

== Early life ==
=== Youth, college & amateur ===
Dupont attended the Montverde Academy. During his time at Montverde, he won a high school national championship in 2016.

In 2016, Dupont attended the University of New Mexico to play college soccer. He redshirted his freshman season, later going on to make 17 appearances and scoring a single goal for the Lobos. In 2019, Dupont transferred to the University of Alabama at Birmingham, making 25 appearances, scoring three goals and tallying two assists. He was named to C-USA All-Conference Third Team in 2020–21 and Commissioner's Academic Honor Roll on two consecutive occasions.

While at college, Dupont appeared in the USL League Two for Albuquerque Sol FC in 2017, and Brazos Valley Cavalry in 2018 and 2019.

== Club career ==
In 2021, Dupont played in Spain with sixth-tier side C.D. Almuñécar City, making five appearances.

On March 30, 2022, Dupont returned to the United States, signing with USL Championship club Birmingham Legion. He made his debut on April 10, 2022, appearing as an injury-time substitute during a 2–1 win over Hartford Athletic. On June 16, 2023, Dupont joined MLS Next Pro side FC Cincinnati 2 on loan for the remainder of the season. He was released by Birmingham at the end of the season.

Dupont joined Spokane Velocity on January 5, 2024, ahead of the club's inaugural USL League One season. Spokane opted not to renew his contract following their 2024 season.
