= Derek Waldeck =

American soccer player (born 1998)

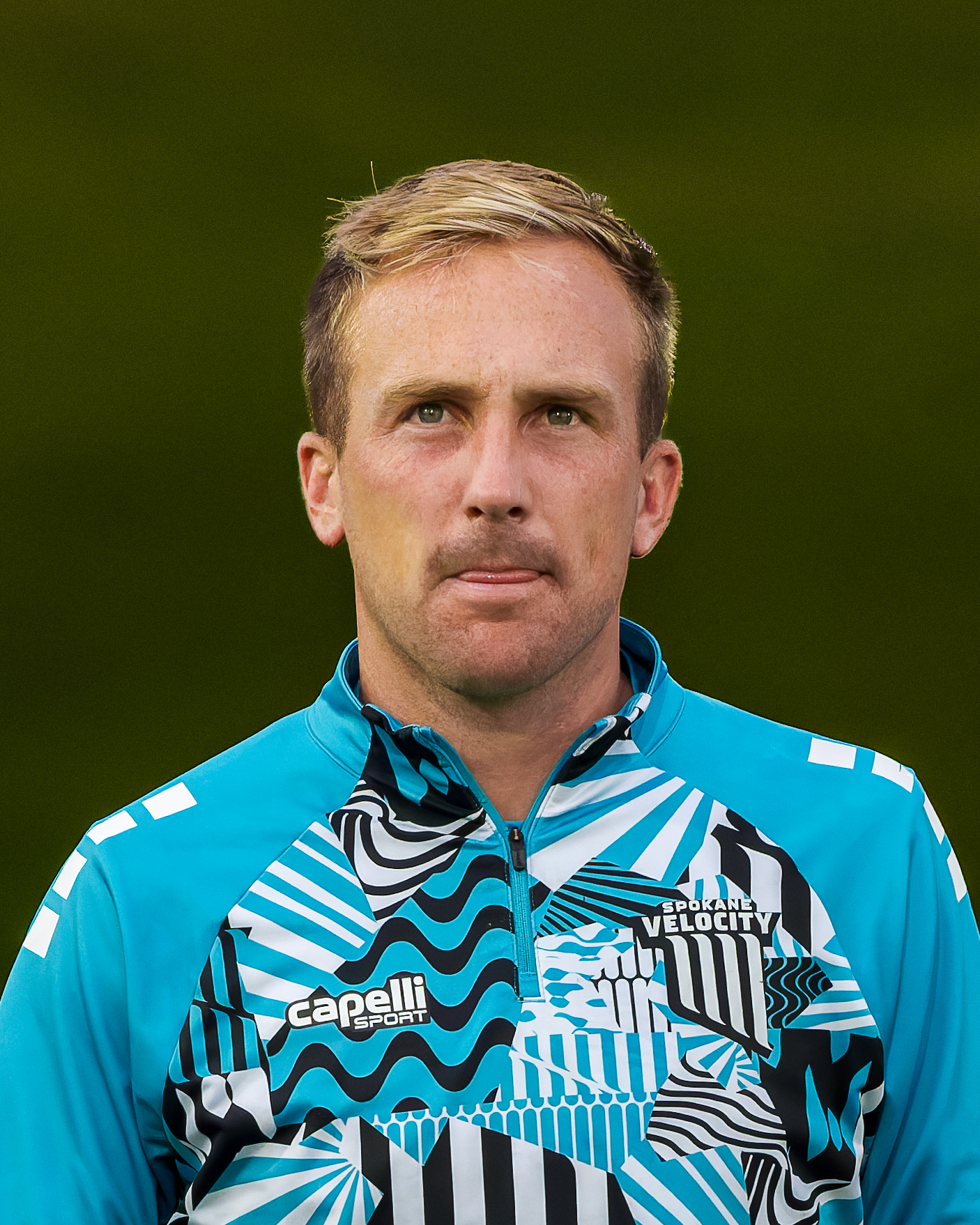
- Waldeck with Spokane Velocity in 2026

Personal information
- Date of birth: February 1, 1998 (age 28)
- Place of birth: Santa Clarita, California, United States
- Height: 5 ft 8 in (1.73 m)
- Positions: Defender; midfielder

Team information
- Current team: Spokane Velocity
- Number: 18

Youth career
- 2012–2013: FC Los Angeles
- 2014–2015: SCV Magic
- 2015–2016: Real So Cal

College career
Years	Team	Apps	(Gls)
2016–2019	Stanford Cardinal	89	(6)

Senior career*
Years	Team	Apps	(Gls)
2018–2019	Southern California Seahorses	12	(1)
2020–2022	North Texas SC	56	(1)
2022	Greenville Triumph	9	(0)
2023	One Knoxville	30	(0)
2024–	Spokane Velocity	78	(3)
- * Club domestic league appearances and goals as of November 1, 2026

Derek Waldeck (born February 1, 1998) is an American soccer player who currently plays for USL League One club Spokane Velocity.

== Playing career ==
=== Youth, college and amateur ===
Waldeck played youth soccer with FC Los Angeles, SCV Magic and Real So Cal in California before playing college soccer at Stanford University. During his time at Stanford, Waldeck made 89 appearances, scoring 6 goals and tallying 22 assists. He won two NCAA National Championships with Stanford, and was named to the United Soccer Coaches All-Far West Region First Team and All-Pac-12 First Team in his senior season.

While at college, Waldeck played with USL League Two side Southern California Seahorses in both 2018 and 2019.

=== MLS SuperDraft ===
On January 13, 2020, Waldeck was selected 66th overall in the 2020 MLS SuperDraft by FC Dallas.

=== North Texas SC ===
On February 14, 2020, Waldeck signed with North Texas SC, the USL League One affiliate of FC Dallas. He made his professional debut on July 25, 2020, starting in a 2–1 victory over Forward Madison.

=== Greenville Triumph ===
On August 16, 2022, Waldeck signed with USL League One side Greenville Triumph.

=== One Knoxville ===
Waldeck joined League One expansion club One Knoxville on January 27, 2023.

=== Spokane Velocity ===
On December 20, 2023, it was announced Waldeck would be part of Spokane Velocity's inaugural season in the USL League One.

== External Link ==
Media related to Derek Waldeck at Wikimedia Commons
