= Josh Dolling =

English footballer

Personal information
- Full name: Joshua Jordan Dolling
- Date of birth: 29 December 1997 (age 28)
- Place of birth: Hillingdon, England
- Height: 6 ft 2 in (1.88 m)
- Position: Forward

Team information
- Current team: Havant & Waterlooville
- Number: 7

Youth career
- –2012: Blackburn Rovers
- 2012–2013: Manchester United
- 2013–2016: Burnley

College career
| Years | Team | Apps | (Gls) |
| 2017–2021 | Missouri State Bears | 82 | (40) |

Senior career*
| Years | Team | Apps | (Gls) |
| 2015–2016 | Burnley | 0 | (0) |
| 2015 | → Trafford (loan) | | |
| 2016–2017 | Prescot Cables | 10 | (6) |
| 2022 | St. Louis City 2 | 21 | (9) |
| 2023 | New Mexico United | 14 | (4) |
| 2023 | → Las Vegas Lights (loan) | 13 | (0) |
| 2024 | Spokane Velocity | 22 | (5) |
| 2025–2026 | AFC Totton | 4 | (0) |
| 2025 | → Basingstoke Town (loan) | 6 | (0) |
| 2026– | Havant & Waterlooville | 1 | (0) |
- * Club domestic league appearances and goals as of 10:06, 25 February 2026 (UTC)

Joshua Jordan Dolling (born 29 December 1997) is a footballer who plays as a forward for Havant & Waterlooville.

== Career ==
=== Youth ===
Dolling began playing with the Blackburn Rovers academy, before getting scouted by Manchester United's under-14 team, where he played before getting released in 2013. Dolling subsequently joined Burnley, where he played with the academy team, scoring 24 goals for the Clarets at youth level. In 2015, he joined Trafford on a short-term loan deal.

In 2016, Dolling signed with Northern Premier League Division One North side Prescot Cables, scoring six goals in ten appearances. Dolling had previously spent time on loan with Prescot Cables whilst with Burnley.

=== College ===
In 2017, Dolling moved to the United States to play college soccer at Missouri State University. In four full seasons with the Bears and a truncated 2020–21 season due to the COVID-19 pandemic, Dolling scored 40 goals and tallied 14 assists in 82 appearances. He earned All-MVC honours in all four seasons with Missouri State, MVC All-Tournament Team in 2019 and 2021, United Soccer Coaches All-American on three occasions, United Soccer Coaches All-Region on four occasions and was on the MAC Hermann Trophy Watch List in his senior year.

Following college, Dolling was available in the 2021 MLS SuperDraft, but went unselected.

=== Professional ===
In early 2022, Dolling signed with MLS Next Pro side St. Louis City SC 2 ahead of their inaugural season. His contract option was declined by St. Louis following the 2022 season.

On 23 December 2022, it was announced that Dolling would join USL Championship side New Mexico United for their 2023 season. On 20 July 2023, Dolling was loaned to USL Championship side Las Vegas Lights for the remainder of the 2023 season.

Dolling joined Spokane Velocity on 5 January 2024, ahead of the club's inaugural USL League One season. Spokane opted not to renew his contract following their 2024 season.

Dolling joined National League South side AFC Totton in August 2025 for The Stags' first ever season at Step 6 of the English football pyramid. On 7 November 2025, Dolling joined Southern League side Basingstoke Town on loan. On 20 February 2026, he joined Havant & Waterlooville on a free transfer.
