= Renato Bustamante =

Peruvian footballer

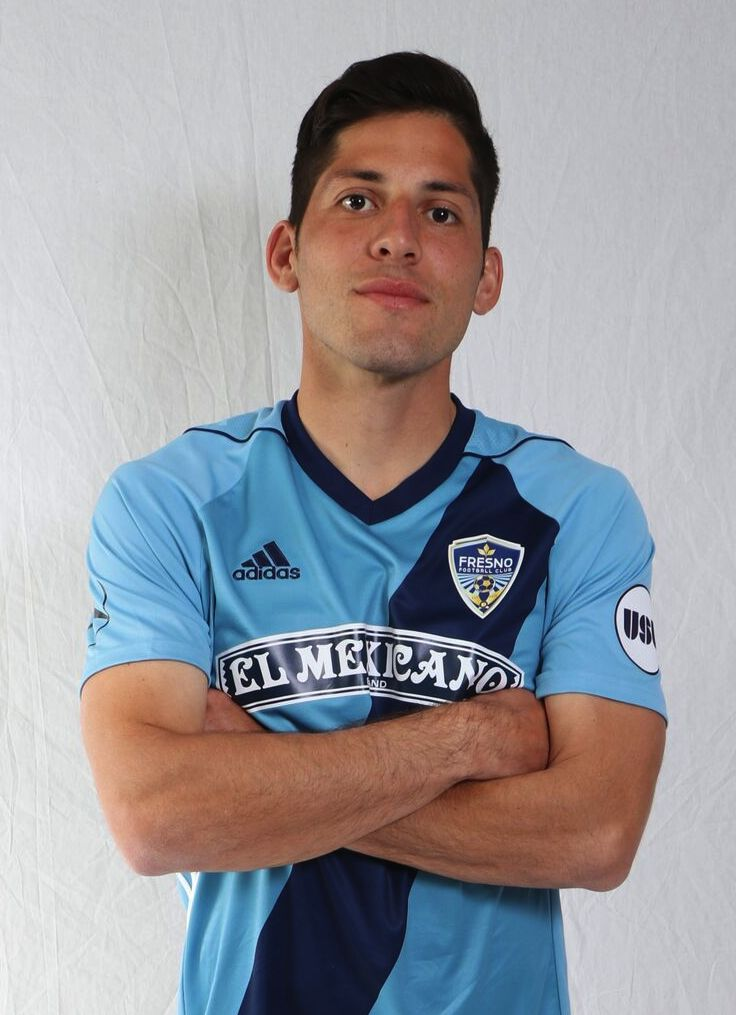

Personal information
- Date of birth: 14 April 1990 (age 36)
- Place of birth: Lima, Peru
- Height: 1.83 m (6 ft 0 in)
- Positions: Forward; attacking midfielder

College career
Years	Team	Apps	(Gls)
2012	Truman Falcons	11	(15)
2013–2015	Fresno Pacific Sunbirds	56	(26)

Senior career*
Years	Team	Apps	(Gls)
2015	Fresno Fuego	13	(7)
2016	Tampa Bay Rowdies 2	7	(0)
2017	Fresno Fuego	13	(9)
2018–2019	Fresno FC	34	(5)
2022	Central Valley Fuego	13	(0)

Managerial career
- 2020–2022: Sequoias Giants
- 2023: Westmont Warriors (assistant)
- 2024–: Spokane Velocity (assistant)
- * Club domestic league appearances and goals as of 7 November 2023

Renato Bustamante (born April 14, 1990) is a Peruvian former professional footballer and current assistant coach for Spokane Velocity of USL League One. He holds a United States Soccer Federation National B Coaching License, Bachelor's Degree in Physical Education from Fresno Pacific University and is fluent in English, Spanish and Portuguese.

== Playing career ==
Bustamante started playing college soccer at Truman College in 2012 where he was Team Captain, All Region and All American NJCAA before transferring to Fresno Pacific University in 2013, where he was named the PacWest Conference Player of the Year and an All-American First Teamer in 2015. During his senior college year, Bustamante appeared for Premier Development League side Fresno Fuego.

Following college, Bustamante signed a professional contract with North American Soccer League side Tampa Bay Rowdies in April 2016, and spent the season on loan to their National Premier Soccer League affiliate Tampa Bay Rowdies 2.

In 2017, he rejoined Fresno Fuego and was named in the Premier Development League's All-Western Conference team.

On January 19, 2018, Bustamante signed a contract with United Soccer League side Fresno FC ahead of their inaugural season. He made his debut on March 17, 2018, as a late substitute in a 2–3 loss to Las Vegas Lights, where he scored a late consolation goal.

ON January 17, 2022, Bustamante returned to the professional game by signing a contract with USL League One expansion club Central Valley Fuego FC.

== Coaching career ==
Bustamante was named head coach of the College of the Sequoias Giants men's soccer team in January 2020. A program that averaged 4.5 wins a year in 13 seasons of existence. Bustamante turned the College of the Sequoias program around in his first year (2021) at the helm. In his first season, Bustamante won the Central Valley Conference, won 10 regular season games, made the State Playoffs, advanced to the second round by defeating the #2 and undefeated seed, and won coach of the year.

Renato also served as a Director of Coaching of NPL Club South Valley United located in Visalia, California from November 2019 until December 2021.

Bustamante was announced as the first assistant coach for USL League One expansion side Spokane Velocity ahead of the 2024 season.

== Personal ==
Bustamante was born in Lima, Peru, before moving to Chicago, Illinois in the United States when he was 12 years old.
