= Lucky Opara =

Nigerian footballer (born 1999)

Personal information
- Full name: Lucky Onyebuchi Opara
- Date of birth: 9 December 1999 (age 26)
- Place of birth: Nigeria
- Height: 1.84 m (6 ft 0 in)
- Position: Left-back

Team information
- Current team: Spokane Velocity
- Number: 13

Senior career*
Years	Team	Apps	(Gls)
2019–2022	Spartaks Jūrmala	47	(5)
2021	→ Lugano (loan)	4	(1)
2021	→ AC Oulu (loan)	15	(4)
2022	→ Narva Trans (loan)	0	(0)
2023–2024	Northern Colorado Hailstorm	51	(5)
2025–	Spokane Velocity	46	(1)
- * Club domestic league appearances and goals as of 12:59, 2 November 2026 (UTC)

Lucky Onyebuchi Opara (born 9 December 1999) is a Nigerian professional footballer who plays as a left-back for USL League One club Northern Colorado Hailstorm.

== Club career ==
Opara began his professional career in Latvia with Spartaks Jūrmala, before joining FC Lugano on loan on 22 January 2021. Opara made his professional debut with FC Lugano in a 3-0 Swiss Super League win over FC Sion on 4 March 2021.

On 13 July 2021, he joined AC Oulu in Finland on loan.

On 2 February 2023, Opara signed with USL League One side Northern Colorado Hailstorm.

On 21 February 2025, Opara signed with USL League One team Spokane Velocity.
