= Leigh Veidman =

English footballer and coach

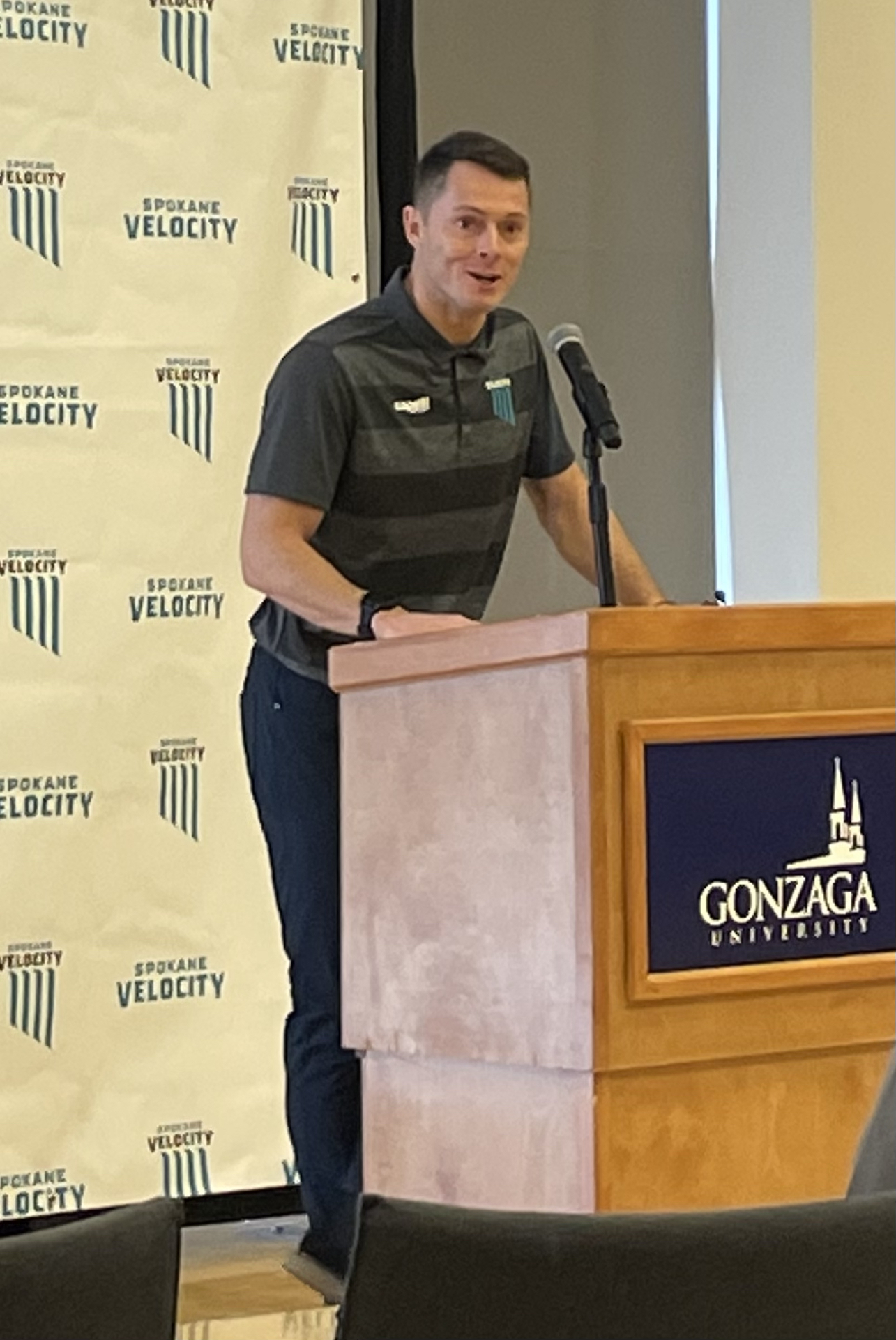
- Veidman with Spokane Velocity in 2023

Personal information
- Full name: Leigh Veidman
- Date of birth: 9 June 1988 (age 38)
- Place of birth: Liverpool, England
- Height: 6 ft 0 in (1.83 m)
- Position: Forward

Team information
- Current team: Spokane Velocity (head coach)

College career
Years	Team	Apps	(Gls)
2008–2010	Iowa Western Reivers	33	(41)
2011	Texas-Brownsville Ocelots	21	(14)
2013	Bellevue Bruins	18	(8)

Senior career*
Years	Team	Apps	(Gls)
2011–2014	Toronto Lynx	56	(13)
2015–2016	Des Moines Menace	16	(12)
2017	FC Boulder U23	12	(6)

Managerial career
- 2015–2017: Midland Warriors (assistant)
- 2016–2017: Des Moines Menace (assistant)
- 2017–2019: FC Boulder (academy)
- 2019–2020: Fresno FC (assistant)
- 2020–2021: OKC Energy (assistant)
- 2021: OKC Energy
- 2023: Charleston Battery (assistant)
- 2024–: Spokane Velocity
- * Club domestic league appearances and goals

Leigh Veidman (born 9 June 1988) is an English professional football coach and former player who is the head coach of USL League One club Spokane Velocity.

== Playing career ==
His career started with stints at both Liverpool and Everton youth academies. Veidman came to the United States from England to play college soccer in 2008. His first stop was at NJCAA team Iowa Western Community College where he was he earned All-Conference honors in 2008 and 2010 and All-American honors in 2010. He holds the record at Iowa Western for most career goals (41) and most career points (91). Veidman transferred to the NAIA school, the University of Texas at Brownsville where he earned All-Conference honors in 2011. The last of his college career was played at the NAIA school Bellevue University where he again earned All-Conference honors in 2013.

Veidman's senior level club career included a stint with then USL PDL club Toronto Lynx from 2011 to 2014, and another at the then-USL PDL club Des Moines Menace in 2015 and 2016. His last season as a player in the PDL was in 2017 with FC Boulder U23.

== Managerial career ==
Veidman started gaining coaching experience by leading Westside High School in Omaha, Nebraska. Between 2015 and 2017, he was an assistant coach at Midland University while concurrently coaching as an assistant during the club season for Des Moines Menace.

His break in to coaching at the professional level came with Fresno FC under Adam Smith. After Fresno FC folded, Veidman came on as an assistant coach for Energy FC under John Pascarella. Veidman got his chance to become a head coach when Energy FC let go of Pascarella in June 2021. He won three out of his first four matches as the head coach, more than the club had won in the entire 2020 season. On October 28, 2021, the interim tag was removed and Veidman officially became the Energy's fourth permanent head coach. However, the Energy were put on hiatus for the 2022 season, later extended through at least the 2023 campaign.

On January 30, 2023, Veidman joined the Charleston Battery as an assistant coach. He helped the Battery to the 2023 USL Championship Final.

On November 15, 2023, Veidman was named the first-ever head coach of USL League One's Spokane Velocity, set to begin play in 2024.

== Career statistics ==
=== Managerial ===
Managerial record by team and tenure
Team	From	To	Record				
Team	From	To	P	W	D	L	Win %
OKC Energy	4 June 2021	28 October 2021	25	8	9	8	32.00
Spokane Velocity	15 November 2023	thru 2025 season	52	21	15	16	40.38
