= Morgan Hackworth =

American soccer player

Personal information
- Full name: Morgan Christopher Hackworth
- Date of birth: January 2, 1997 (age 29)
- Place of birth: Winston-Salem, North Carolina, United States
- Height: 1.80 m (5 ft 11 in)
- Positions: Defender; midfielder

Youth career
- 2013–2015: Philadelphia Union

College career
Years	Team	Apps	(Gls)
2015–2017	Syracuse Orange	8	(0)
2017–2018	Akron Zips	42	(4)

Senior career*
Years	Team	Apps	(Gls)
2017	Tampa Bay Rowdies U23	7	(0)
2018	Peachtree City MOBA	5	(1)
2019	Memphis 901	16	(0)
2020–2023	San Diego Loyal	55	(0)
2024	Spokane Velocity	2	(0)
Total		85	(1)
- * Club domestic league appearances and goals

Morgan Christopher Hackworth (born January 2, 1997) is an American former soccer player.

== Playing career ==
On December 20, 2023, Hackworth was announced as one of the first two signings for USL League One expansion club Spokane Velocity. Spokane opted not to renew his contract following their 2024 season.

== Personal ==
From Philadelphia, Morgan is the son of former soccer player and Louisville City FC head coach John Hackworth. His youngest brother, Larsen Hackworth, currently plays for St. Louis City SC 2.
