= Collin Fernandez =

American-Peruvian footballer (born 1997)

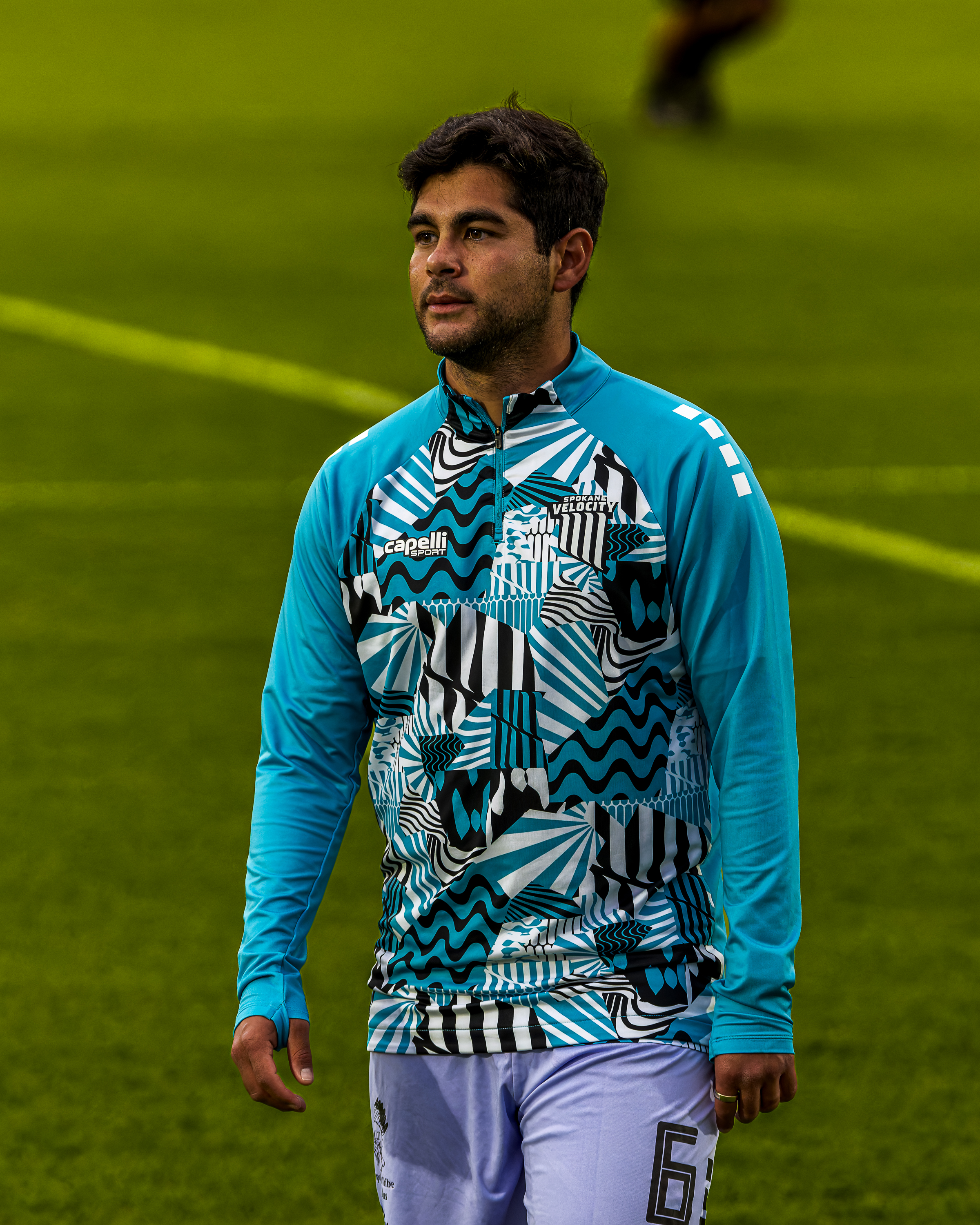
- Fernandez with Spokane Velocity in 2026

Personal information
- Date of birth: 13 February 1997 (age 29)
- Place of birth: Hinsdale, Illinois, United States
- Height: 1.73 m (5 ft 8 in)
- Position: Midfielder

Team information
- Current team: Spokane Velocity
- Number: 6

Youth career
- 2010–2015: Chicago Fire

Senior career*
Years	Team	Apps	(Gls)
2015–2017	Chicago Fire	3	(0)
2015	→ Louisville City (loan)	4	(0)
2016	→ Saint Louis FC (loan)	3	(0)
2017	→ Tulsa Roughnecks (loan)	28	(1)
2018–2019	Phoenix Rising	26	(2)
2019	Saint Louis FC	11	(0)
2020	Tacoma Defiance	8	(0)
2021	Austin Bold	30	(4)
2022	Sporting Kansas City II	22	(1)
2023	FC Tulsa	32	(0)
2024–	Spokane Velocity	67	(0)

International career^{‡}
2014	United States U18	10	(1)
2015	United States U20	2	(0)
2016	Peru U20	7	(2)
- * Club domestic league appearances and goals as of November 1, 2026 ‡ National team caps and goals as of 1 May 2016

Collin Fernandez (born 13 February 1997) is a professional footballer who currently plays for USL League One side Spokane Velocity. Born in the United States, he has most recently represented Peru at youth level.

== Career ==
=== Professional ===
On 28 August 2014, Fernandez signed a homegrown player contract with Chicago Fire, making him the fifth homegrown signing in club history and the third in 2014. However, he was not eligible to play for the first team until 2015.

On 9 June 2015, Fernandez was sent on loan to USL club Louisville City FC. He made his professional debut the following day in a 2–0 victory over FC Montreal.

On 18 July 2019, Fernandez moved from Phoenix Rising FC to Saint Louis FC.

On 14 January 2020, Fernandez signed with Tacoma Defiance.

Fernandez moved to USL Championship side Austin Bold on 21 April 2021.

On 7 February 2022, Fernandez joined MLS Next Pro club Sporting Kansas City II.

Fernandez made the move to USL Championship club FC Tulsa on November 10, 2022. He left Tulsa at the end of their 2023 season.

On 12 January 2024, Fernandez joined Spokane Velocity ahead of their inaugural season in the USL League One.

=== International ===
Fernandez has represented the United States in the under-18 and under-20 level. He played for the Peru under-20 team in November 2016.
