= Carlos Merancio =

Mexican footballer (born 1998)

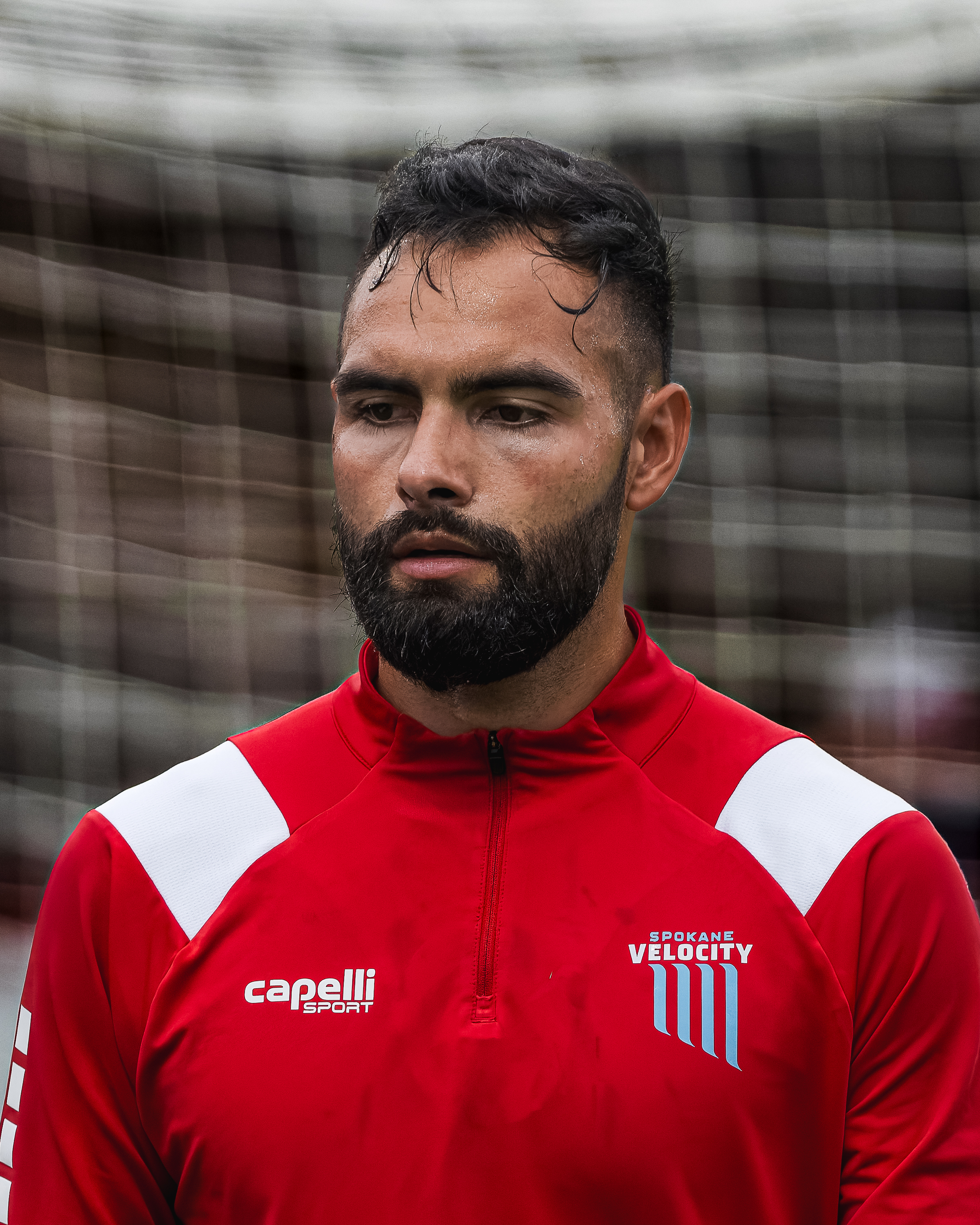
- Merancio with Spokane Velocity FC in 2026

Personal information
- Full name: Carlos Uriel Merancio Valdez
- Date of birth: 14 September 1998 (age 28)
- Place of birth: Hermosillo, Mexico
- Height: 1.89 m (6 ft 2 in)
- Position: Goalkeeper

Team information
- Current team: Spokane Velocity
- Number: 23

Youth career
- 2012–2013: Monterrey
- 2013–2018: Morelia

Senior career*
Years	Team	Apps	(Gls)
2017–2018	Monarcas Morelia Premier	1	(0)
2019–2020	FC Tucson	22	(0)
2021	Hartford Athletic	1	(0)
2022	FC Tucson	29	(0)
2023	Rio Grande Valley FC	6	(0)
2024–	Spokane Velocity	45	(0)
- * Club domestic league appearances and goals as of November 1, 2026

Carlos Uriel Merancio Valdez (born 14 September 1998) is a Mexican professional footballer who plays as a goalkeeper for Spokane Velocity in USL League One.

== Career ==
Merancio played with the youth team of Monarcas Morelia, appearing for their second-team Monarcas Morelia Premier in 2018.

Merancio joined FC Tucson ahead of their inaugural season in the new USL League One.

On 11 January 2021, Merancio joined USL Championship side Hartford Athletic.

Merancio rejoined FC Tucson for the 2022 season on December 20, 2021. Carlos was the goalkeeper coach for Arizona Mens Soccer, the soccer team at the University of Arizona. Carlos has his own goalkeeper academy in Tucson called "Tophand goalkeeping academy".

On 3 February 2023, Merancio signed with USL Championship side Rio Grande Valley FC.

On 5 January 2024, Merancio joined USL League One club Spokane Velocity FC in its inaugural season.
