= Spokane Velocity =

American soccer club

Spokane Velocity FC
- Founded: 2022
- Stadium: One Spokane Stadium; Spokane, Washington
- Capacity: 5,000
- Owner(s): Aequus Sports, LLC (Ryan and Katie Harnetiaux)
- Head coach: Leigh Veidman
- League: USL League One
- 2025: USL League One, 3rd of 14; Playoffs: Runners-up
- Website: spokanevelocityfc.com
Home colors	Away colors	Third colors

Spokane Velocity FC is an American professional soccer club based in Spokane, Washington. The Velocity compete in USL League One, the third tier of the U.S. soccer pyramid, and play home matches at One Spokane Stadium. The team was founded in 2022 and began play in the 2024 season, where they finished as runners-up in the playoffs. The Velocity shares its ownership and stadium with Spokane Zephyr FC, a women's team in the first-division USL Super League.

The club's current head coach is Leigh Veidman.

== History ==
In March 2021, United Soccer League announced a proposal to build a 5,000-seat stadium in downtown Spokane to serve as home to a new USL League One club. In May 2021, the Spokane Public School Board voted to approve the $31 million stadium project. In December 2021, the Spokane Public Facilities District met with USL and MLS Next Pro officials over which league would place a team at the city-run stadium.

On October 7, 2022, the club announced their new ownership group, Aequus Sports, LLC (led by Ryan and Katie Harnetiaux) as well as that their men's team would start play in USL League One in 2024. The club announced a partnership with Capelli Sport on June 21, 2023, making them their exclusive uniform, equipment, and training apparel provider. The official team name, Spokane Velocity FC, and crest were announced at a launch event on July 21, 2023. On November 15, 2023, Charleston Battery assistant coach Leigh Veidman was named Spokane Velocity's first-ever head coach.

On December 20, 2023, Spokane Velocity signed its first two players, midfielder Morgan Hackworth and defender Derek Waldeck. The club signed veteran midfielder Luis Gil, a former MLS and United States national team player, on January 22, 2024.

The club's inaugural match was a 3–1 loss to Greenville Triumph SC played on March 9, 2024, at Paladin Stadium in South Carolina. Josh Dolling scored the first goal in Velocity FC history—a penalty kick taken in the 13th minute. The Velocity's first-ever home match at One Spokane Stadium on March 16 was a 2–1 victory against the Richmond Kickers in front of a sold-out crowd of 5,086. The club entered the 2024 U.S. Open Cup and won their first cup match against Ballard FC, the defending USL League Two champions, on March 20 at Memorial Stadium in Seattle.

Spokane were the third expansion team in USL League One history to qualify for the playoffs in their inaugural season, doing so on October 12, 2024. The team won 3-0 in its first-ever playoff match against Northern Colorado Hailstorm FC on November 2. The Velocity then defeated Forward Madison FC in a penalty shootout to decide the semifinals and clinch their place in the USL League One championship match. They were the lowest seed to qualify for the title match and the second expansion team to do so in their inaugural season. The team lost 3–0 to Union Omaha and finished as runners-up in the playoffs.

== Stadium ==
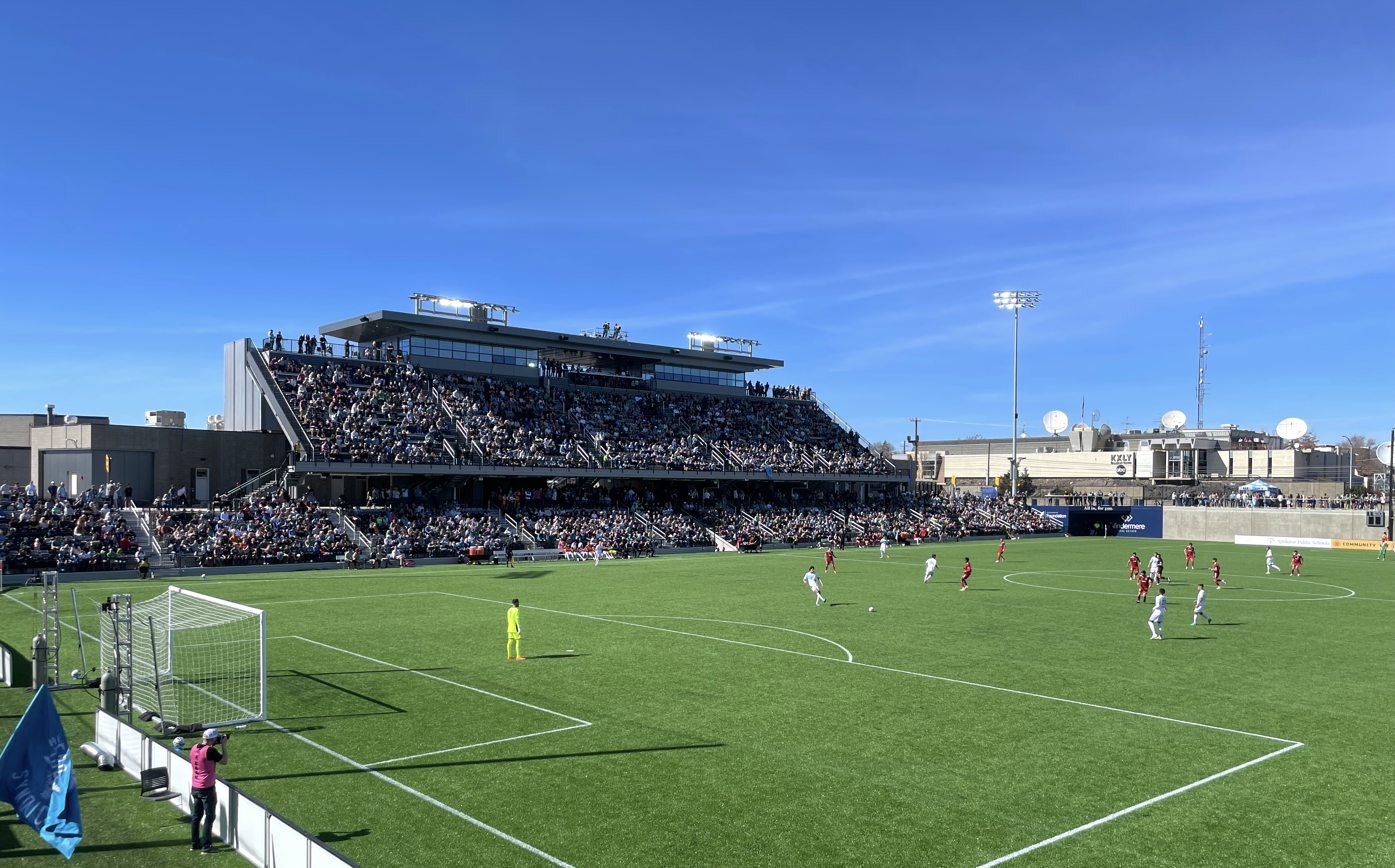
Spokane Velocity home opener vs. Richmond Kickers on March 16, 2024.

Spokane Velocity play its home matches at ONE Spokane Stadium, located in downtown Spokane next to The Podium and the Spokane Arena. It has a capacity of 5,000 and can expand to 12,000 with on-field seating.

The venue was completed in September 2023 and plays host to Velocity-affiliated club Spokane Zephyr, along with Spokane Public Schools high-school football games and events including concerts and comedy shows. The capacity was reached during Spokane Velocity's home opener in March 2024.

== Club identity ==
The team's name and crest were unveiled on July 21, 2023. Both reference the Spokane River, which runs through Downtown Spokane and passes near One Spokane Stadium. The crest features four vertical blue bars that represent the river's waterfalls, while the "Velocity" wordmark above is shaped similar to a simplified version of the Monroe Street Bridge. The Velocity's official colors are named basalt, impact blue, and river rapid white.

=== Sponsorship ===
Seasons	Shirt manufacturer	Shirt sponsor
2024–present	(United States) Capelli Sport	Front: QR Code rotating sponsor Back: Brick West Brewing Company; Sleeve: Gallagher

== Club culture ==
The team's largest supporters' group is the 509 Syndicate, which organizes a march to the match through Riverfront Park to One Spokane Stadium. The 509 Syndicate takes part in drumming and chanting during each match, and are found in section 125, midfield east side. Their mascot is the "Goats", a reference to the Garbage Goat sculpture in Riverfront Park.

== Broadcasting ==
Local Spokane television stations KHQ/SWX broadcast a selection of Velocity matches throughout the season. Similarly, KREM 2/KSKN 22 cover some home matches. The club's matches have also been televised on CBS Sports Network as part of a national contract with USL League One. With a couple of exceptions, all USL League One matches are streamed on ESPN+.

== Affiliated teams ==
In June 2021, Spokane was named as one of the founding cities of the USL W League, a women's league that began play in 2022. The team is set to join W League for the 2024 season, along with the completion of One Spokane Stadium.

Spokane's ownership announced in October 2022 that they wanted to bring professional women's soccer to the city. A women's team representing Spokane in the USL Super League was announced in May 2023. It will be owned by the USL Spokane ownership group and begin play in August 2024, sharing their home stadium with the men's team and W League team. The team name was announced in November 2023, as Spokane Zephyr FC. The club held their first match, which ended in a 1–1 with Fort Lauderdale United FC, at a sold-out One Spokane Stadium on August 17, 2024.

== Staff ==
As of October 18, 2024

Technical Staff
Head coach	Leigh Veidman
Assistant coach	Renato Bustamante
Goalkeeping coach	Vito Higgins
Front Office Staff
President, USL Spokane	Katie Harnetiaux

== Players ==
=== Roster ===
As of August 2, 2026

Note: Flags indicate national team as defined under FIFA eligibility rules; some limited exceptions apply. Players may hold more than one non-FIFA nationality.

No.	Pos.	Nation	Player
1	GK	USA	Sean Lewis
3	DF	USA	Nick Spielman
4	DF	USA	Simon Fitch
5	DF	GEO	Gagi Margvelashvili
6	MF	PER	Collin Fernandez
7	MF	USA	Joe Gallardo
8	MF	ESP	Nil Vinyals
9	FW	JAM	Neco Brett
10	MF	USA	Luis Gil
11	MF	GRN	Shavon John-Brown
12	DF	USA	Camron Miller
13	DF	NGR	Lucky Opara

No.	Pos.	Nation	Player
14	FW	USA	Mark Hernández
16	FW	COL	Anuar Peláez
17	FW	CAN	Medgy Alexandre (on loan from Charleston Battery)
18	DF	USA	Derek Waldeck
19	MF	ENG	Jack Denton
20	DF	FRA	Ibrahim Covi
22	FW	USA	Rocky Wells
23	GK	MEX	Carlos Merancio
33	DF	GHA	Moses Mensah
34	MF	USA	Ali Elmasnaouy (on loan from Oakland Roots)
42	MF	USA	Bryce Meredith
77	MF	JAM	Andre Lewis

USL Academy Contract

=== Club captains ===
Years	Name	Nation
2024–present	Luis Gil	United States

== Team records ==
As of November 10, 2024

=== USL League One ===
Season	USL League One								Playoffs	USOC	Top Scorer ^{1}	G
Season	P	W	D	L	GF	GA	Pts	Pos	Playoffs	USOC	Top Scorer ^{1}	G
2024	22	7	6	9	26	35	27	7th	Finals	Third Round	(United States) Luis Gil	8
2025	30	14	9	7	41	35	51	3rd	Finals	Second Round	(Colombia) Anuar Peláez	10

1. Top Scorer includes all goals scored in regular season, league playoffs, U.S. Open Cup, and other competitive continental matches.

=== USL League One Playoffs ===
Season	Qualified	Round Entered	Round Finish
2024	Yes	Quarterfinals	Finals
2025	Yes	Quarterfinals	Finals

=== USL Cup ===
Season	USL Cup								Play-offs	Top Scorer	
Season	P	W	D	L	GF	GA	Pts	Pos	Play-offs	Player	G
2024	8	1	2	5	9	17	5	4th, West	Did not qualify	(United States) Luis Gil	4
2025	4	1	0	3	2	5	5	7th, Group 1	Did not qualify	(United States) Luis Gil (Colombia) Anuar Peláez	1

=== U.S. Open Cup ===
Season	U.S. Open Cup								Top Scorer	
Season	P	W	D	L	GF	GA	Entered	Exited	Player	G
2024	3	2	0	1	3	2	First round	Third round	(Jamaica) Andre Lewis	2
2025	2	1	0	1	2	2	First round	Second round	(United States) Luis Gil (Colombia) Anuar Peláez	1
2026	2	1	1	0	4	2	First round	Second round	(Jamaica) Andrew Booth (United States) Joe Gallardo (Colombia) Anuar Peláez	1

=== Head coaches ===
Includes USL Regular Season, USL Playoffs, U.S. Open Cup, and USL Jagermeister Cup. Excludes friendlies.

Coach	Nationality	Start	End	Games	Wins	Losses	Draws	Win %
Leigh Veidman	England	November 15, 2023	present	80	33	29	18	0.4125
