= 2026 Fort Wayne FC season =

Fort Wayne FC
- Owner: List: DaMarcus Beasley; Mark Music; John Bellio; Drew Little; Tom Lapsley; Michael Khorshid
- Manager: Mike Avery
- Stadium: Ruoff Mortgage Stadium
- USL League One: 9th
- U.S. Open Cup: NA
- USL Cup: Group Stage
- USL Playoffs: NA
- Top goalscorer: League: (United States) Taig Healy (10 Goals); All: (United States) Taig Healy (11 Goals)
- Highest home attendance: 4,493 vs Spokane Velocity July 4
- Lowest home attendance: 2,389 vs Portland Hearts of Pine May 6
- Average home league attendance: 3,554, with USL Cup 3,604
- Biggest win: Fort Wayne FC 3–0 Portland Hearts of Pine May 6 Fort Wayne FC 3–0 Spokane Velocity July 4 Fort Wayne FC 3–0 Greenville Triumph SC July 18
- Biggest defeat: AV Alta FC 3–0 Fort Wayne FC August 8

The 2026 Fort Wayne FC season was the sixth season in the club's existence as well as their first in USL League One, the third-tier of American soccer after spending 5 seasons in USL League Two. Despite not playing in last year's US Open Cup, due to rule changes, Fort Wayne cannot compete in the U.S. Open Cup because expansion teams are not allowed to compete.

== Players and staff ==
=== Current roster ===
As of August 14, 2026

Note: Flags indicate national team as defined under FIFA eligibility rules; some limited exceptions apply. Players may hold more than one non-FIFA nationality.

No.	Pos.	Nation	Player
1	GK	PHI	Bernd Schipmann
2	DF	ENG	Jayden Smith
4	DF	POR	Tiago Dias
5	DF	USA	Reid Sproat
6	MF	USA	JP Jordan
8	MF	ESA	Jeremy Garay
9	FW	ENG	Daniel Oyetunde
10	MF	FRA	Clarence Awoudor
11	MF	USA	Taig Healy
12	MF	NGR	Kabiru Gafar
13	DF	USA	Michael Rempel
18	MF	USA	Emerson Nieto

No.	Pos.	Nation	Player
19	DF	COL	Juan Solís
20	MF	PUR	Nico Burns
21	MF	USA	Ryan Becher
22	DF	USA	Anthony Hernandez
23	MF	ENG	Jack Thomas
27	GK	USA	Alex Grow
33	DF	USA	Tyson Hagaman
35	MF	USA	Johnny Aye
41	MF	NZL	James Musa
86	MF	ESP	Javier Armas
96	GK	PUR	Aurie Briscoe
99	GK	USA	Taner Akin

1. USL Academy Contract

== Transfers ==
=== In ===
Date	Position	Number	Name	from	Type	Fee	Ref.
January 9, 2026	DF	4	(Portugal) Tiago Dias	(United States) Bryant Bulldogs	Signing	NA	
January 11, 2026	MF	6	(United States) JP Jordan	(United States) Texoma FC	Signing	NA	
January 13, 2026	DF	13	(United States) Michael Rempel	(United States) Lindsey Wilson Blue Raiders	Signing	NA	
January 15, 2026	DF	5	(United States) Reid Sproat	(United States) Fort Wayne FC	Re-Signing	NA	
January 16, 2026	MF	86	(Spain) Javier Armas	(United States) Atlanta United 2	Signing	NA	
January 18, 2026	DF	22	(United States) Anthony Hernandez	(United States) Bowling Green Falcons	Signing	Free	
January 20, 2026	MF	11	(United States) Taig Healy	(United States) NC State Wolfpack	Signing	Free	
January 22, 2026	MF	8	(El Salvador) Jeremy Garay	(United States) Loudoun United	Signing	Free	
January 24, 2026	GK	1	(Philippines) Bernd Schipmann	(United States) Forward Madison FC	Signing	Free	
January 27, 2026	MF	21	(United States) Ryan Becher	(United States) St. Louis City 2	Signing	Free	
January 31, 2026	DF	41	(New Zealand) James Musa	(United States) Indy Eleven	Signing	Free	
February 4, 2026	DF	2	(England) Jayden Smith	(England) Coventry City	Signing	Free	
February 6, 2026	FW	7	(France) Lilian Ricol	(United States) UCF Knights	Signing	Free	
February 11, 2026	DF	19	(Colombia) Juan Solís	(Colombia) Real Santander	Signing	Free	
February 13, 2026	MF	10	(France) Clarence Awoudor	(United States) UCF Knights	Signing	Free	
February 17, 2026	GK	96	(Puerto Rico) Aurie Briscoe	(United States) Butler Bulldogs	Signing	Free	
February 20, 2026	FW	9	(England) Daniel Oyetunde	(England) Arsenal U21s	Signing	Free	
February 26, 2026	MF	23	(England) Jack Thomas	(United States) LSU–Shreveport Pilots	Signing	Free	
March 5, 2026	FW	30	(United States) Ian Abbey	(United States) Rutgers Scarlet Knights	25-day Contract	Free	
March 6, 2026	FW	34	(United States) Trace Terry	(United States) Bowling Green Falcons	Signing	Free	
March 7, 2026	GK	99	(United States) Taner Akin	(United States) GGS Soccer Academy	Academy Contract	Free	
April 7, 2026	MF	12	(Nigeria) Kabiru Gafar	(United States) Indianapolis Greyhounds	Signing	Free	
April 10, 2026	GK	27	(United States) Alex Grow	(United States) Bradley Braves	25 day contract	Free	
May 2, 2026	MF	18	(United States) Emerson Nieto	(United States) Indiana Tech Warriors	Signing	Free	
May 2, 2026	DF	33	(United States) Tyson Hagaman	(Germany) SV Gutenstetten	Academy Contract	Free	
May 2, 2026	MF	20	(Puerto Rico) Nico Burns	(United States) FC Cincinnati Academy	Academy Contract	Free	
July 11, 2026	MF	35	(United States) John Aye	(United States) Fort Wayne FC Academy	Academy Contract	Free	
August 28, 2026	MF	17	(United States) Logan Neidlinger	(United States) Indy Eleven	Loan	Free	
August 28, 2026	FW	24	(Jamaica) Kameron Lacey	(United States) Asheville City SC	Signing	Free	
September 4, 2026	FW	25	(United States) Mamadi Jiana	(United States) Houston Dynamo 2	Loan	Free	
September 9, 2026	DF		(Serbia) Aleksandar Vukovic	(United States) Phoenix Rising FC	Loan	Free	

=== Out ===
Date	Position	Number	Name	to	Type	Fee	Ref.
May 1	FW	34	(United States) Trace Terry	NA	Retired	NA	
May 28	FW	30	(United States) Ian Abbey	NA	Mutually parted	NA	
August 14	FW	7	(France) Lilian Ricol	(United States) San Antonio FC	Transfer	Undisclosed, but near record fee	

== Non-competitive fixtures ==
=== Friendlies ===
February 27	Lexington SC	v	Fort Wayne FC	Lexington, Kentucky
2:00 PM ET				Stadium: Lexington SC Stadium

== Competitive fixtures ==
=== Regular season ===
March 7 1	FC Naples	2–0	Fort Wayne FC	Naples, Florida
7:00 PM EDT	Torrellas (yellow card) 21'; Garcia 45'; Bachstein 88'	Report	Hernandez (yellow card) 32'; Jordan (yellow card) 42'	Stadium: Paradise Coast Sports Complex; Attendance: 4,072; Referee: Edson Carvajal

March 14 2	Sarasota Paradise	2–2	Fort Wayne FC	Lakewood Ranch, Florida
7:30 PM EDT	Røed 45+1'; Stretch (yellow card) 49'; Bolanos 63'	Report	Ricol 30'; Becher 36' (yellow card) 90+3'; Musa (yellow card) 70'	Stadium: Premier Sports Campus; Attendance: 1,806; Referee: Calin Radosav

March 28 3	New York Cosmos	2–0	Fort Wayne FC	Paterson, New Jersey
2:00 PM EDT	Guenzatti 21'; Galazzini 50' (yellow card) 83'; Mendonca (yellow card) 74'; Koffi (yellow card) 76'	Report	Solis (yellow card) 24'; Sproat (yellow card) 37'; Ricol (yellow card) 72'; Oyetunde (yellow card) 89'; Dias (yellow card) 90+3'	Stadium: Hinchliffe Stadium; Attendance: 1,146; Referee: Matthew Corrigan

April 11 4	Chattanooga Red Wolves SC	0–1	Fort Wayne FC	East Ridge, Tennessee
7:00 PM EDT	Bentley (yellow card) 38'; Adewole (yellow card) 45+1'; Kinzner (yellow card) 57'; Mackenzie (yellow card) 60' (yellow-red card) 60'; Jolley (yellow card) 62'	Report	Healy 1'; Solis (yellow card) 31'; Oyetunde (yellow card) 35'; Jordan (yellow card) 61'; Terry (yellow card) 81' (yellow-red card) 90+1'; Ricol (yellow card) 90+3'	Stadium: CHI Memorial Stadium; Attendance: 1,206; Referee: Benjamin Meyer

May 2 5	Fort Wayne FC	2–2	Charlotte Independence	Fort Wayne, Indiana
7:30 PM EDT	Healy 4'; Smith 10'; Solis (yellow card) 70'; Jordan (yellow card) 87'	Report	Manzinga 7' (yellow card) 70'; Martínez 15'; Bakero (yellow card) 72'	Stadium: Ruoff Mortgage Stadium; Attendance: 4,000; Referee: Christopher Calderon

May 6 6	Fort Wayne FC	3–0	Portland Hearts of Pine	Fort Wayne, Indiana
7:30 PM EDT	Smith (yellow card) 44'; Ricol 54', 64'; Dias (yellow card) 67'; Healy 70'; Rempel (yellow card) 77'; Abbey (yellow card) 83'	Report	Terzaghi (yellow card) 21'; Wright (yellow card) 39'; Lopez (yellow card) 59'; Drack (yellow card) 74'	Stadium: Ruoff Mortgage Stadium; Attendance: 2,389; Referee: Izlen Peksenar

May 9 7	Fort Wayne FC	1–0	Westchester SC	Fort Wayne, Indiana
7:30 PM EDT	Healy 35' (yellow card) 67'; Oyetunde (yellow card) 36'; Garay (yellow card) 52'	Report	Jennings (yellow card) 53'; Bouman (yellow card) 79'	Stadium: Ruoff Mortgage Stadium; Attendance: 2,872; Referee: Stefan Perri

May 20 8	Fort Wayne FC	1–1	Corpus Christi FC	Fort Wayne, Indiana
7:30 PM EDT	Solis (yellow card) 19'; Nieto (yellow card) 39'; Rempel (yellow card) 46'; Dias 50'; Garay (yellow card) 85'	Report	Medina (yellow card) 9' (yellow-red card) 72'; Abeal (yellow card) 30'; Cerritos 63'; Roscoe (yellow card) 90+2'	Stadium: Ruoff Mortgage Stadium; Attendance: 2,399; Referee: Amin Hadzic

May 23 9	Athletic Club Boise	1–3	Fort Wayne FC	Garden City, Idaho
9:00 PM EDT	Kostyshyn (yellow card) 48'; Ndiaye (yellow card) 57'; Gasso 59'; Yeyha (yellow card) 90+5'	Report	Ricol 9', 83'; Jordan (yellow card) 18'; Schipmann (yellow card) 20'; Healy 58'; Rempel (yellow card) 76'	Stadium: Stadium at Expo Idaho; Attendance: 7,201; Referee: Justin St. Pierre

May 30 10	Fort Wayne FC	0–0	AV Alta FC	Fort Wayne, Indiana
7:30 PM EDT	Sproat (yellow card) 26'; Jordan (yellow card) 51'; Dias (yellow card) 90+4'	Report	Alassane (yellow card) 33' (yellow-red card) 47'; Aoumaich (yellow card) 51'; Smith (yellow card) 67'	Stadium: Ruoff Mortgage Stadium; Attendance: 3,925; Referee: Alex Beehler

June 10 11	Westchester SC	1–1	Fort Wayne FC	Mount Vernon, New York
7:00 PM EDT	McGlynn 28'; Pierre (yellow card) 78'; Gjokaj (yellow card) 83'; Jennings (yellow card) 85'	Report	Dias (yellow card) 45'; Healy 74'; Jordan (yellow card) 84'; Gafar (yellow card) 87'	Stadium: The Stadium at Memorial Field; Attendance: 1,271; Referee: Drew Klemp

June 13 12	Fort Wayne FC	v	South Georgia Tormenta FC	Fort Wayne, Indiana
				Stadium: Ruoff Mortgage Stadium
Note: Game cancelled following South Georgia Tormenta FC's withdrawal from USL League One.

June 17 13	Forward Madison FC	1–1	Fort Wayne FC	Madison, Wisconsin
8:00 PM EDT	Glaeser (yellow card) 14' (yellow-red card) 15'; Toure (yellow card) 22'; Bolma 28'; Torres (yellow card) 86'	Report	Ricol (yellow card) 45'; Becher 51'; Jordan (yellow card) 80'; Gafar (yellow card) 82'	Stadium: Breese Stevens Field; Attendance: 3,170; Referee: John Griggs

June 20 14	Richmond Kickers	0–2	Fort Wayne FC	Richmond, Virginia
7:00 PM EDT	Barnathan (yellow card) 13'; Amer (yellow card) 63'	Report	Thomas 17' (yellow card) 74'; Healy 39'; Dias (yellow card) 42'; Armas (yellow card) 65'; Becher (yellow card) 89'	Stadium: City Stadium; Attendance: 4,019; Referee: Lauren Aldrich

July 4 15	Fort Wayne FC	3–0	Spokane Velocity	Fort Wayne, Indiana
7:30 PM EDT	Healy 14'; Smith (yellow card) 16'; Gafar (yellow card) 38'; Garay 44'; Ricol 48' (pen.); Nieto (yellow card) 90+2'	Report		Stadium: Ruoff Mortgage Stadium; Attendance: 4,493; Referee: Joe Surgan

July 15 16	One Knoxville SC	2–1	Fort Wayne FC	Knoxville, Tennessee
6:30 PM EDT	Krioutchenkov (yellow card) 2' (yellow-red card) 45+1'; Gill (yellow card) 30'; McLeod 47'; Linhares (yellow card) 70'; Caputo 81'	Report	Armas (red card) 2'; Avery (yellow card) 45+1'; Solis (yellow card) 56'; Gafar 73'; Ricol (yellow card) 90+10'	Stadium: Covenant Health Park; Attendance: 2,482; Referee: Corbyn May

July 18 17	Fort Wayne FC	3–0	Greenville Triumph SC	Fort Wayne, Indiana
7:30 PM EDT	Becher 16'; Healy (yellow card) 23'; Nieto (yellow card) 34'; Ricol 35'; Gafar 57'	Report	Nour (yellow card) 15'; Meek (yellow card) 19'; Agyaakwah (yellow card) 90+3'	Stadium: Ruoff Mortgage Stadium; Attendance: 3,755; Referee: Atahan Yaya

July 25 18	Spokane Velocity	3–0	Fort Wayne FC	Spokane, Washington
9:00 PM EDT	Mensah (yellow card) 21'; Vinyals (yellow card) 58'; John-Brown 66', 81' (yellow card) 81'; Gil 84'	Report	Thomas 15'; Armas (yellow card) 74'; Becher (yellow card) 74'; Jordan (yellow card) 83'	Stadium: One Spokane Stadium; Attendance: 1,857; Referee: Elorm Atisu

August 1 19	Fort Wayne FC	0–2	Union Omaha	Fort Wayne, Indiana
7:30 PM EDT	Dias (yellow card) 75'; Rempel (red card) 88'	Report	Gavilanes 61'; Malone (yellow card) 71'; Cabral (yellow card) 71'; Ors 74'; Vargas (yellow card) 90+5'	Stadium: Ruoff Mortgage Stadium; Attendance: 3,801; Referee: Jorge Escobar

August 8 20	AV Alta FC	3–0	Fort Wayne FC	Lancaster, California
11:00 PM EDT	Desdunes 37'; Villalobos (yellow card) 47'; Ibarra 54'; Relerford (yellow card) 87'; Acuña 90'	Report	Smith (yellow card) 45+1'; Jordan (yellow card) 59'; Oyetunde (yellow card) 87'	Stadium: Lancaster Municipal Stadium; Attendance: 3,708; Referee: Igor Bych

August 15 21	Fort Wayne FC	1–2	Chattanooga Red Wolves SC	Fort Wayne, Indiana
7:30 PM EDT	Rempel (yellow card) 15'; Becher 30'; Armas (yellow card) 49'; Awoudor (yellow card) 81'; Garay (yellow card) 90+4'; Musa (yellow card) 90+7'	Report	Adewole (yellow card) 13'; Lelin 49'; Mercer 82'; Knapp (yellow card) 90+5'	Stadium: Ruoff Mortgage Stadium; Attendance: 4,090; Referee: Richonne Clark

August 22 22	South Georgia Tormenta FC	v	Fort Wayne FC	Statesboro, Georgia
				Stadium: Tormenta Stadium
Note: Match was cancelled.

August 29 23	Portland Hearts of Pine	1–4	Fort Wayne FC	Portland, Maine
7:00 PM EDT	Poon-Angeron (yellow card) 24'; Camara (yellow card) 34'; Wright 86' (yellow card) 90+1'	Report	Healy 8', 61'; Awoudor 40'; Nieto (yellow card) 49'; Lacey 77'; Dias (yellow card) 84'; Neidlinger (yellow card) 90+5'	Stadium: Fitzpatrick Stadium; Attendance: 6,368; Referee: Amin Hadzic

September 2 24	Fort Wayne FC	2–0	Richmond Kickers	Fort Wayne, Indiana
7:30 PM EDT	Smith 45'; Dias (yellow card) 57'; Armas (yellow card) 62'; Thomas 75'	Report	Moore (yellow card) 27'; Layton (yellow card) 81'	Stadium: Ruoff Mortgage Stadium; Attendance: 3,109; Referee: Ryan Homik

September 5 25	Fort Wayne FC	2–4	New York Cosmos	Fort Wayne, Indiana
7:30 PM EDT	Jordan (yellow card) 28'; Rempel (yellow card) 50'; Becher 66'; Armas (yellow card) 74'; Awoudor 90+2' (pen.)	Report	Cabrera (yellow card) 21'; Ramos (yellow card) 34'; Jawneh 44', 71'; Chavez 45+2' (yellow card) 52'; Sproat 47' (o.g.)	Stadium: Ruoff Mortgage Stadium; Attendance: 4,294; Referee: Braeden Frey

September 12 26	Greenville Triumph SC	1–3	Fort Wayne FC	Mauldin, South Carolina
7:00 PM EDT	Agyaakwah (yellow card) 15'; Fricke 34'; Liadi (yellow card) 41'; Villanueva (yellow card) 56'; Nour (yellow card) 74'	Report	Evans 4' (o.g.); Nieto (yellow card) 29'; Neidlinger (yellow card) 32'; Becher 42', 58'; Dias (yellow card) 66'	Stadium: GE Vernova Park; Attendance: 2,417; Referee: Mario Maric

September 16 27	Fort Wayne FC	2–3	One Knoxville SC	Fort Wayne, Indiana
7:30 PM EDT	Musa 9' (yellow card) 90+3'; Becher 39'	Report	Uderitz (yellow card) 41'; Caputo (yellow card) 49'; Perkins (yellow card) 56'; Diop 73'; Baker 74'; Gill (yellow card) 86'; Krioutchenkov 88' (yellow card) 89'	Stadium: Ruoff Mortgage Stadium; Attendance: 2,829; Referee: José Lara

September 19 28	Fort Wayne FC	2–2	FC Naples	Fort Wayne, Indiana
7:30 PM EDT	Armas (yellow card) 65'; Thomas (yellow card) 67'; Dias 83'; Becher 90+2'	Report	Cisneros 11' (yellow card) 25'; Garcia 17'; Likulia (yellow card) 45+3'; Mastrantonio (yellow card) 54'; Delgado (yellow card) 79'; Yoder (yellow card) 90+6'; Gray (yellow card) 90+7'	Stadium: Ruoff Mortgage Stadium; Attendance: 3,462; Referee: Anthony Sobolevsky

September 26 29	Charlotte Independence	1–1	Fort Wayne FC	Matthews, North Carolina
7:00 PM EDT	Jaime (yellow card) 30' (yellow-red card) 63'; Pinho 89'	Report	Nieto (yellow card) 51'; Dias (yellow card) 54' (goal) 82'	Stadium: Sportsplex at Matthews; Attendance: 708; Referee: Erick Lezama

October 3 30	Fort Wayne FC	0–0	Forward Madison FC	Fort Wayne, Indiana
7:30 PM EDT	Neidlinger (yellow card) 70'; Becher (yellow card) 88'	Report	Torres (yellow card) 16'; Edwards (yellow card) 80'	Stadium: Ruoff Mortgage Stadium; Attendance: 3,849; Referee: Muhammad Kaleia

October 7 31	Corpus Christi FC	1–3	Fort Wayne FC	Corpus Christi, Texas
8:30 PM EDT	Zayed (yellow card) 45+5'; Gomez (yellow card) 79'; Vasic (yellow card) 81'; Johnson 83'; Bowen (yellow card) 88'	Report	Vukovic (yellow card) 27'; Armas 33'; Gafar 37'; Becher (yellow card) 45+3'; Schipmann (yellow card) 69'; Dias 79'; Nieto (yellow card) 90+6'	Stadium: Cabaniss Athletic Complex; Attendance: 1,678; Referee: Servando Berna Rico

October 10 32	Union Omaha	0–1	Fort Wayne FC	Omaha, Nebraska
5:00 PM EDT	Owusu (yellow card) 56'; Cabral (yellow card) 90+1'	Report	Healy 25'; Neidlinger (yellow card) 48'; Vukovic (yellow card) 58' (yellow-red card) 70'; Armas (yellow card) 77'; Schipmann (yellow card) 90+5'	Stadium: Morrison Stadium; Attendance: 5,094; Referee: Drew Klemp

October 17 33	Fort Wayne FC	1–3	Sarasota Paradise	Fort Wayne, Indiana
7:30 PM EDT	Rempel 14' (yellow card) 85'; Jordan (yellow card) 27'; Armas (yellow card) 82'; Dias (yellow card) 90+8'	Report	Bolanos 25'; Sutton (yellow card) 27'; Rosa 45+1'; Terzaghi (yellow card) 87'; McLaughlin 90+7'	Stadium: Ruoff Mortgage Stadium; Attendance: 3,491; Referee: Eduardo Hernandez

October 24 34	Fort Wayne FC	0–2	Athletic Club Boise	Fort Wayne, Indiana
7:30 PM EDT	Awoudor (yellow card) 53'; Vukovic (yellow card) 67' (yellow-red card) 70'	Report	Moon (yellow card) 10'; Mayaka (yellow card) 13'; Barea 39'; Kliewer (yellow card) 79'; Amang 90+1'	Stadium: Ruoff Mortgage Stadium; Attendance: 4,099; Referee: Muhammad Hassan

=== USL Cup ===
April 25 Group Stage	Louisville City FC	3–1	Fort Wayne FC	Louisville, Kentucky
7:00 PM EDT	Duncan 8'; Huerman (yellow card) 28'; Dia (yellow card) 50'; Serrano 78'; Adams 81'	Report	Ricol 5'; Rempel (yellow card) 29'; Jordan (yellow card) 80'; Dias (yellow card) 90'	Stadium: Lynn Family Stadium; Attendance: 8,876; Referee: Thomas Snyder

May 16 Group Stage	Fort Wayne FC	2–2 (1–3 p)	Indy Eleven	Fort Wayne, Indiana
7:30 PM EDT	Healy 33'; Abbey (yellow card) 44'; Garay (yellow card) 45+1'; Thomas (yellow card) 79' (goal) 90+1'; Dias (yellow card) 83'	Report	Blake (yellow card) 15'; Quinn 26'; Neidlinger (yellow card) 39'; Rendón 64'; Craig (yellow card) 68'	Stadium: Fort Wayne FC Park; Attendance: 3,794; Referee: Muhammad Hassan
	Penalties
	Ricol (penalty scored); Healy (penalty missed); Nieto (penalty missed); Thomas (penalty missed)		(penalty scored) Blake; (penalty scored) Quinn; (penalty scored) O'Brien

June 6 Group Stage	Union Omaha	4–2	Fort Wayne FC	Omaha, Nebraska
8:00 PM EDT	Faz 15'; Gavilanes 17'; Tekiela (yellow card) 66' (goal) 66', 85'	Report	Nieto (yellow card) 30'; Hernandez (yellow card) 34'; Oyetunde 41'; Becher 45'	Stadium: Morrison Stadium; Attendance: 2,348; Referee: Gerald Flores

July 11 Group Stage	Fort Wayne FC	1–2	Detroit City FC	Fort Wayne, Indiana
7:30 PM EDT	Sproat (yellow card) 53'; Ricol 86'	Report	Diouf (yellow card) 40'; Smith 62'; Mentzingen 71'; Hernandez-Foster (yellow card) 90+2'	Stadium: Ruoff Mortgage Stadium; Attendance: 4,214; Referee: Carlos Rodriguez

=== Appearances and goals ===
No.	Pos	Nat	Player	Total		USL League One		USL Cup		USL League One Playoffs	
No.	Pos	Nat	Player	Apps	Goals	Apps	Goals	Apps	Goals	Apps	Goals
1	GK	(Philippines) PHI	Bernd Schipmann	32	0	31+0	0	1+0	0	0+0	0
2	DF	(England) ENG	Jayden Smith	28	2	9+15	2	3+1	0	0+0	0
3	FW	(Serbia) SRB	Aleksandar Vukovic	5	0	4+1	0	0+0	0	0+0	0
4	DF	(Portugal) POR	Tiago Dias	34	4	31+0	4	2+1	0	0+0	0
5	DF	(United States) USA	Reid Sproat	20	0	9+8	0	2+1	0	0+0	0
6	MF	(United States) USA	JP Jordan	34	0	27+4	0	1+2	0	0+0	0
7	FW	(France) FRA	Lilian Ricol	23	9	17+2	7	2+2	2	0+0	0
8	MF	(El Salvador) ESA	Jeremy Garay	26	1	10+12	1	4+0	0	0+0	0
9	FW	(England) ENG	Daniel Oyetunde	23	1	4+15	0	2+2	1	0+0	0
10	MF	(France) FRA	Clarence Awoudor	33	2	18+12	2	1+2	0	0+0	0
11	MF	(United States) USA	Taig Healy	35	12	30+2	11	3+0	1	0+0	0
12	MF	(Nigeria) NGR	Kabiru Gafar	31	3	20+8	3	2+1	0	0+0	0
13	DF	(United States) USA	Michael Rempel	32	1	28+2	1	2+0	0	0+0	0
17	MF	(United States) USA	Logan Neidlinger	12	0	8+4	0	0+0	0	0+0	0
18	MF	(United States) USA	Emerson Nieto	31	0	18+10	0	2+1	0	0+0	0
19	DF	(Colombia) COL	Juan Solis	17	0	7+6	0	4+0	0	0+0	0
20	MF	(Puerto Rico) PUR	Nico Burns	1	0	0+0	0	0+1	0	0+0	0
21	MF	(United States) USA	Ryan Becher	29	10	20+7	9	2+0	1	0+0	0
22	DF	(United States) USA	Anthony Hernandez	10	0	3+4	0	2+1	0	0+0	0
23	MF	(England) ENG	Jack Thomas	27	4	10+14	3	2+1	1	0+0	0
24	FW	(Jamaica) JAM	Kameron Lacey	7	1	1+6	1	0+0	0	0+0	0
25	FW	(United States) USA	Mamadi Jiana	8	0	1+7	0	0+0	0	0+0	0
27	GK	(United States) USA	Alex Grow	0	0	0+0	0	0+0	0	0+0	0
30	FW	(United States) USA	Ian Abbey	7	0	2+3	0	2+0	0	0+0	0
33	DF	(United States) USA	Tyson Hageman	0	0	0+0	0	0+0	0	0+0	0
34	FW	(United States) USA	Trace Terry	4	0	0+3	0	0+1	0	0+0	0
35	MF	(United States) USA	John Aye	1	0	0+1	0	0+0	0	0+0	0
41	DF	(New Zealand) NZL	James Musa	23	1	18+3	1	0+2	0	0+0	0
86	MF	(Spain) ESP	Javier Armas	29	1	25+2	1	2+0	0	0+0	0
96	GK	(Puerto Rico) PUR	Aurie Briscoe	4	0	1+0	0	3+0	0	0+0	0
99	GK	(United States) USA	Taner Akin	0	0	0+0	0	0+0	0	0+0	0

=== Top Goalscorers ===
Rank	Position	Number	Name	USL1 Season	USL Cup	USL League One Playoffs	Total
1	MF	11	(United States) Taig Healy	11	1	0	12
2	MF	21	(United States) Ryan Becher	9	1	0	10
3	FW	7	(France) Lilian Ricol	7	2	0	9
4	DF	5	(Portugal) Tiago Dias	4	0	0	4
4	MF	23	(England) Jack Thomas	3	1	0	4
6	MF	12	(Nigeria) Kabiru Gafar	3	0	0	3
7	DF	2	(England) Jayden Smith	2	0	0	2
7	MF	10	(France) Clarence Awoudor	2	0	0	2
9	MF	8	(El Salvador) Jeremy Garay	1	0	0	1
9	DF	13	(United States) Michael Rempel	1	0	0	1
9	FW	24	(Jamaica) Kameron Lacey	1	0	0	1
9	DF	41	(New Zealand) James Musa	1	0	0	1
9	MF	86	(Spain) Javier Armas	1	0	0	1
9			Own Goals	1	0	0	1
9	FW	9	(England) Daniel Oyetunde	0	1	0	1
Total				47	6	0	53

=== Assist scorers ===
Rank	Position	Number	Name	USL1 Season	USL Cup	USL League One Playoffs	Total
1	MF	12	(Nigeria) Kabiru Gafar	4	2	0	6
2	MF	11	(United States) Taig Healy	5	0	0	5
2	MF	86	(Spain) Javier Armas	4	1	0	5
4	MF	10	(France) Clarence Awoudor	3	1	0	4
5	DF	13	(United States) Michael Rempel	3	0	0	3
5	MF	23	(England) Jack Thomas	3	0	0	3
7	DF	2	(England) Jayden Smith	2	0	0	2
7	DF	5	(Portugal) Tiago Dias	2	0	0	2
7	FW	7	(France) Lilian Ricol	2	0	0	2
7	MF	18	(United States) Emerson Nieto	1	1	0	2
11	GK	1	(Philippines) Bernd Schipmann	1	0	0	1
11	MF	6	(United States) JP Jordan	1	0	0	1
11	MF	21	(United States) Ryan Becher	1	0	0	1
11	DF	22	(United States) Anthony Hernandez	0	1	0	1
Total				32	6	0	38

=== Clean sheets ===
Rank	Name	USL1 Season	USL Cup	Total
1	(Philippines) Bernd Schipmann	10	0	10
Total		10	0	10

=== Disciplinary record ===
No.	Pos.	Player	USL League One Regular Season			USL Cup			USL League One Playoffs			Total		
No.	Pos.	Player	Yellow card	(yellow card) (yellow-red card)	Red card	Yellow card	(yellow card) (yellow-red card)	Red card	Yellow card	(yellow card) (yellow-red card)	Red card	Yellow card	(yellow card) (yellow-red card)	Red card
1	GK	(Philippines) Bernd Schipmann	3	0	0	0	0	0	0	0	0	3	0	0
2	DF	(England) Jayden Smith	3	0	0	0	0	0	0	0	0	3	0	0
3	FW	(Serbia) Aleksandar Vukovic	3	2	0	0	0	0	0	0	0	3	2	0
4	DF	(Portugal) Tiago Dias	11	0	0	2	0	0	0	0	0	13	0	0
5	DF	(United States) Reid Sproat	2	0	0	1	0	0	0	0	0	3	0	0
6	MF	(United States) JP Jordan	11	0	0	1	0	0	0	0	0	12	0	0
7	FW	(France) Lilian Ricol	4	0	0	0	0	0	0	0	0	4	0	0
8	MF	(El Salvador) Jeremy Garay	3	0	0	1	0	0	0	0	0	4	0	0
9	FW	(England) Daniel Oyetunde	4	0	0	0	0	0	0	0	0	4	0	0
10	MF	(France) Clarence Awoudor	2	0	0	0	0	0	0	0	0	2	0	0
11	MF	(United States) Taig Healy	2	0	0	0	0	0	0	0	0	2	0	0
12	MF	(Nigeria) Kabiru Gafar	3	0	0	0	0	0	0	0	0	3	0	0
13	DF	(United States) Michael Rempel	6	0	1	1	0	0	0	0	0	7	0	1
17	MF	(United States) Logan Neidlinger	4	0	0	0	0	0	0	0	0	4	0	0
18	MF	(United States) Emerson Nieto	7	0	0	1	0	0	0	0	0	8	0	0
19	DF	(Colombia) Juan Solis	5	0	0	0	0	0	0	0	0	5	0	0
20	MF	(Puerto Rico) Nico Burns	0	0	0	0	0	0	0	0	0	0	0	0
21	MF	(United States) Ryan Becher	5	0	0	0	0	0	0	0	0	5	0	0
22	DF	(United States) Anthony Hernandez	1	0	0	1	0	0	0	0	0	2	0	0
23	MF	(England) Jack Thomas	2	0	0	1	0	0	0	0	0	3	0	0
27	GK	(United States) Alex Grow	0	0	0	0	0	0	0	0	0	0	0	0
30	FW	(United States) Ian Abbey	1	0	0	1	0	0	0	0	0	2	0	0
33	DF	(United States) Tyson Hageman	0	0	0	0	0	0	0	0	0	0	0	0
34	FW	(United States) Trace Terry	1	1	0	0	0	0	0	0	0	1	1	0
41	DF	(New Zealand) James Musa	3	0	0	0	0	0	0	0	0	3	0	0
86	MF	(Spain) Javier Armas	8	0	1	0	0	0	0	0	0	8	0	1
96	GK	(Puerto Rico) Aurie Briscoe	0	0	0	0	0	0	0	0	0	0	0	0
99	GK	(United States) Taner Akin	0	0	0	0	0	0	0	0	0	0	0	0
	Head Coach	(United States) Mike Avery	1	0	0	0	0	0	0	0	0	1	0	0
Total			94	3	2	10	0	0	0	0	0	104	3	2

== Honors and awards ==
=== Annual Awards ===
==== USL League One All League Honorees ====
Player	Team	Position	Ref
(Portugal) Tiago Dias	First Team	MF	

=== USL League One Monthly Awards ===
==== USL League Player of the Month ====
Month	Player	Position	Ref
July	(France) Lilian Ricol	FW	

=== USL League One Weekly Awards ===
==== USL League One Team of the Week ====
Week	Player	Opponent	Position	Ref
2	(France) Lilian Ricol	Sarasota Paradise	FW	
2	(United States) Ryan Becher	Sarasota Paradise	Bench	
4	(Spain) Javier Armas	New York Cosmos	Bench	
6	(United States) JP Jordan	Chattanooga Red Wolves SC	DF	
6	(Colombia) Juan Solis	Chattanooga Red Wolves SC	DF	
6	(United States) Taig Healy	Chattanooga Red Wolves SC	Bench	
8/9	(Spain) Javier Armas	Charlotte Independence	Bench	
10	(Philippines) Bernd Schipmann	Portland Hearts of Pine and Westchester SC	GK	
10	(United States) Michael Rempel	Portland Hearts of Pine and Westchester SC	DF	
10	(El Salvador) Jeremy Garay	Portland Hearts of Pine and Westchester SC	MF	
10	(Spain) Taig Healy	Portland Hearts of Pine and Westchester SC	FW	
10	(United States) Mike Avery	Portland Hearts of Pine and Westchester SC	Head Coach	
10	(France) Lilian Ricol	Portland Hearts of Pine and Westchester SC	Bench	
11/12	(United States) Michael Rempel	Athletic Club Boise	DF	
11/12	(France) Lilian Ricol	Athletic Club Boise	FW	
11/12	(Spain) Javier Armas	Athletic Club Boise	Bench	
16	(Philippines) Bernd Schipmann	Forward Madison FC	GK	
16	(England) Jack Thomas	Forward Madison FC	FW	
16	(United States) JP Jordan	Forward Madison FC	Bench	
17/18	(Nigeria) Kabiru Gafar	Spokane Velocity	DF	
19/20	(United States) Michael Rempel	Greenville Triumph SC	DF	
19/20	(France) Lilian Ricol	Spokane Velocity	Bench	
24	(Spain) Javier Armas	Chattanooga Red Wolves SC	Bench	
26	(Portugal) Tiago Dias	Portland Hearts of Pine	DF	
26	(United States) Taig Healy	Portland Hearts of Pine	MF	
26	(United States) JP Jordan	Portland Hearts of Pine	Bench	
26	(France) Clarence Awoudor	Portland Hearts of Pine	Bench	
28	(United States) Ryan Becher	Greenville Triumph SC	FW	
29	(Portugal) Tiago Dias	FC Naples	Bench	
30	(Portugal) Tiago Dias	Charlotte Independence	DF	
30	(United States) JP Jordan	Charlotte Independence	Bench	
32	(United States) Michael Rempel	Corpus Christi FC and Union Omaha	DF	
32	(Philippines) Bernd Schipmann	Union Omaha	Bench	
32	(Portugal) Tiago Dias	Corpus Christi FC	Bench	
33	(United States) Michael Rempel	Sarasota Paradise	Bench	

==== USL League One Save of the Week ====
Week	Player	Opponent	Ref
2	(Philippines) Bernd Schipmann	Sarasota Paradise	

=== USL League One Goal of the Week ===
Week	Player	Opponent	Ref
6	(United States) Taig Healy	Chattanooga Red Wolves SC	
26	(United States) Taig Healy	Portland Hearts of Pine	

=== USL Cup Awards ===
==== USL Cup Save of the Round ====
Week	Player	Opponent	Ref
3	(Puerto Rico) Aurie Echevarría	Union Omaha	
