= 2026 Spokane Velocity season =

Spokane Velocity
2026 season
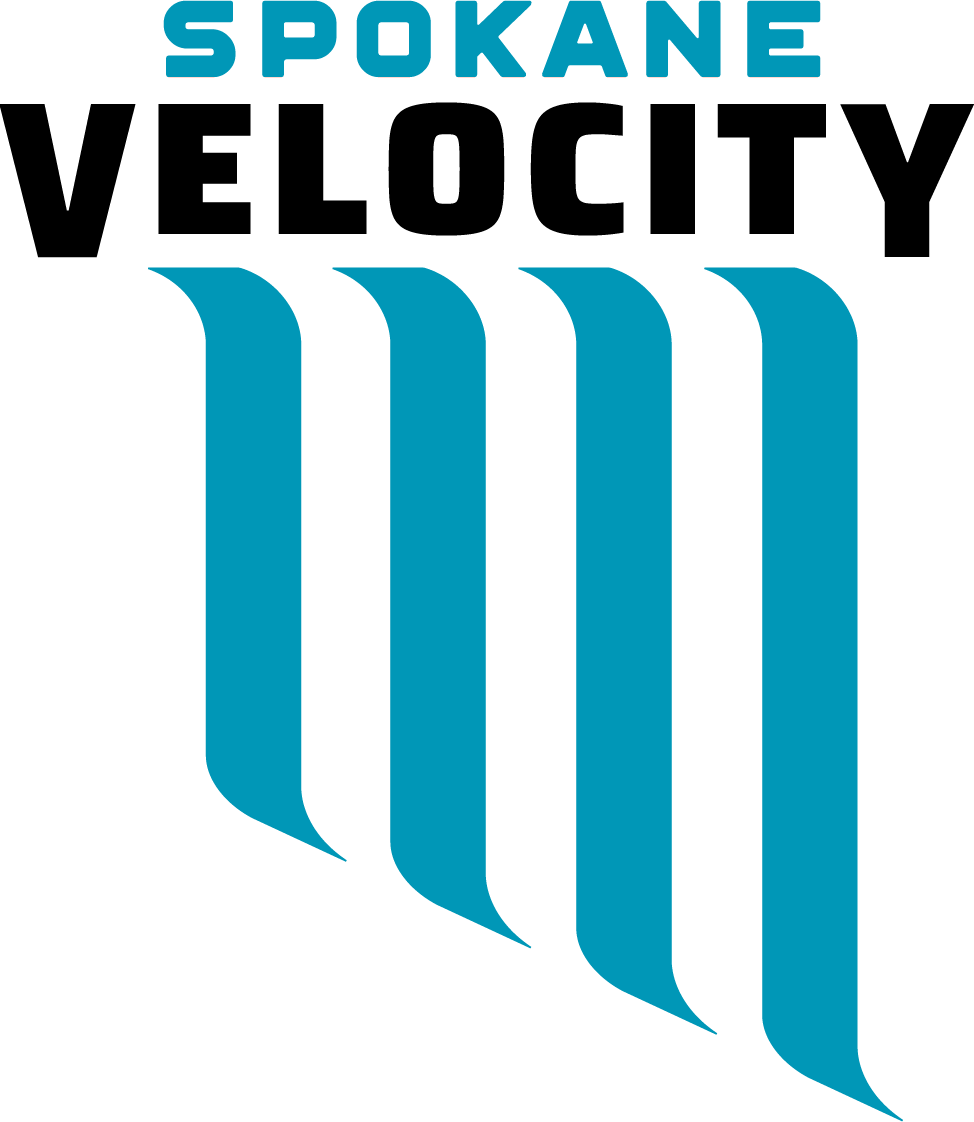
- Owner: Aequus Sports, LLC (Ryan and Katie Harnetiaux)
- Head coach: Leigh Veidman
- Stadium: One Spokane Stadium
- USL League One: 5th
- U.S. Open Cup: Second Round
- USL Cup: Quarterfinals
- Top goalscorer: League: (Grenada) Shavon John-Brown (8 Goals); All: (Jamaica) Neco Brett (9 Goals)
- Highest home attendance: 2,677 vs Athletic Club Boise September 20
- Lowest home attendance: 1,155 vs Greenville Triumph SC August 22, 972 vs Colorado Springs Switchbacks August 12 (USL Cup)
- Average home league attendance: 1,824, with USL Cup 1,806
- Biggest win: Spokane Velocity 3–0 Charlotte Independence July 22
- Biggest defeat: Charlotte Independence 4–0 Spokane Velocity March 27; Spokane Velocity 0–4 One Knoxville SC June 20; Sacramento Republic FC 4-0 Spokane Velocity April 25

The 2026 Spokane Velocity season was the third season in the club's existence as well as their third in USL League One, the third-tier of American soccer.

== Players and staff ==
=== Current roster ===
As of May 10, 2026

Note: Flags indicate national team as defined under FIFA eligibility rules; some limited exceptions apply. Players may hold more than one non-FIFA nationality.

No.	Pos.	Nation	Player
1	GK	USA	Sean Lewis
3	DF	USA	Nick Spielman
4	DF	USA	Simon Fitch
5	DF	GEO	Gagi Margvelashvili
6	MF	PER	Collin Fernandez
8	MF	ESP	Nil Vinyals
9	FW	JAM	Neco Brett
10	MF	USA	Luis Gil
11	FW	GRN	Shavon John-Brown
12	DF	USA	Camron Miller
13	DF	NGR	Lucky Opara
14	MF	USA	Mark Hernández

No.	Pos.	Nation	Player
16	FW	COL	Anuar Peláez
17	FW	CAN	Medgy Alexandre
18	DF	USA	Derek Waldeck
19	MF	ENG	Jack Denton
20	DF	FRA	Ibrahim Covi
22	FW	USA	Rocky Wells
23	GK	MEX	Carlos Merancio
27	FW	USA	Joe Gallardo
33	DF	GHA	Moses Mensah
37	GK	USA	Jackson Buck
42	MF	USA	Bryce Meredith
77	MF	JAM	Andre Lewis

USL Academy Contract

== Staff ==
As of October 18, 2024

Technical Staff
Head coach	Leigh Veidman
Assistant coach	Renato Bustamante
Assistant coach	Neil Hlavaty
Goalkeeping coach	Vito Higgins
Front Office Staff
President, USL Spokane	Katie Harnetiaux

== Transfers ==
=== In ===
Date	Position	Number	Name	from	Type	Fee	Ref.
December 23, 2025	DF	27	(United States) Joe Gallardo	(United States) Union Omaha	Signing	NA	
January 27, 2026	DF	4	(United States) Simon Fitch	(United States) Richmond Kickers	Signing	NA	
March 9, 2026	DF	3	(United States) Nick Spielman	(United States) Charlotte Independence	Signing	NA	
March 10, 2026	DF	33	(Ghana) Moses Mensah	(United States) Birmingham Legion FC	Signing	NA	
March 12, 2026	DF	5	(Georgia (country)) Gagi Margvelashvili	(United States) Oakland Roots SC	Signing	NA	
March 13, 2026	GK	1	(United States) Sean Lewis	(United States) One Knoxville SC	Signing	NA	
March 24, 2026	DF	20	(France) Ibrahim Covi	(United States) Carolina Core FC	Signing	NA	
March 25, 2026	FW	17	(Canada) Medgy Alexandre	(United States) Charleston Battery	on Loan from Charleston Battery	NA	
April 1, 2026	MF	80	(Jamaica) Andrew Booth	(United States) South Georgia Tormenta FC	25 Day Contract	NA	
May 9, 2026	GK		(United States) Jackson Buck	NA	25 Day Contract	NA	
July 23, 2026	MF	34	(United States) Ali Elmasnaouy	(United States) Oakland Roots SC	Loan from Oakland Roots SC	NA	
August 31, 2026	FW	24	(United States) Nathan Donovan	(United States) Minneapolis City SC	signing	NA	

=== Out ===
Date	Position	Number	Name	to	Type	Fee	Ref.
December 9, 2025	DF	15	(The Gambia) Ish Jome	NA	Retirement	NA	
December 17, 2025	MF	11	(United States) Pierre Reedy	(United States) Sacramento Republic FC	Signing	NA	
December 22, 2025	DF	4	(Spain) David García	(United States) Oakland Roots	Signing	NA	
January 9, 2026	DF	3	(United States) Jalen Crisler	NA	Contract Expired	NA	
January 9, 2026	DF	2	(Spain) Javier Martín Gil	NA	Contract Expired	NA	
January 9, 2026	FW	7	(United States) Masango Akale	(United States) Minneapolis City SC	Contract Expired	NA	
January 9, 2026	GK	1	(United States) Ryan Bilichuk	NA	Contract Expired	NA	

== Non-competitive fixtures ==
=== Friendlies ===
February 27	Phoenix Rising FC	v	Spokane Velocity	Phoenix, Arizona
6:30 PM PDT				Stadium: Phoenix Rising Soccer Stadium

== Competitive fixtures ==
=== Regular Season ===
March 8 1	South Georgia Tormenta FC	v	Spokane Velocity	Statesboro, Georgia
12:00 PM PDT				Stadium: Tormenta Stadium
Note: Game cancelled following South Georgia Tormenta FC's withdrawal from USL League One.

March 15 2	Spokane Velocity	1–0	Union Omaha	Spokane, Washington
3:00 PM PDT	Kallman 67' (o.g.)		Cáceres (yellow card) 52'	Stadium: One Spokane Stadium; Attendance: 1,669

March 21 3	Spokane Velocity	3–1	New York Cosmos	Spokane, Washington
12:00 PM PDT	Denton 25'; Miller (yellow card) 29'; Gil 39' (pen.); Brett 43'; Spielman (yellow card) 70'; Merancio (yellow card) 77'	Report	Morabito (yellow card) 27'; Stephani (yellow card) 39'; Chavez (yellow card) 40'; Milovanov 48'; Spengler (yellow card) 66'; Guenzatti (yellow card) 80'	Stadium: One Spokane Stadium; Attendance: 1,849; Referee: Kalilou Jarju

March 27 4	Charlotte Independence	4–0	Spokane Velocity	Charlotte, North Carolina
4:30 PM PDT	Fitch 2' (o.g.); Álvarez 23'; Jaime (yellow card) 41'; Romero 45+3'; Lyons 80'		Waldeck (yellow card) 14'; Gallardo (yellow card) 45+3'; Veidman (yellow card) 63'	Stadium: American Legion Memorial Stadium; Attendance: 925; Referee: Kyle Johnston

April 4 5	Athletic Club Boise	1–1	Spokane Velocity	Garden City, Idaho
6:00 PM PDT	Moon 51'; Mayaka (yellow card) 80'	Report	Gallardo 21'; Lewis (yellow card) 29'; Vinyals (yellow card) 32'; Booth (yellow card) 36'; Peláez (yellow card) 44'; Margvelashvili (yellow card) 83'; Hernández (yellow card) 89'	Stadium: Stadium at Expo Idaho; Attendance: 7,211; Referee: Corbyn May

April 7 6	Spokane Velocity	3–1	AV Alta FC	Spokane, Washington
6:00 PM PDT	Booth 45'; John-Brown 55'; Vinyals 90+3'	Report	Lay 7'; Aoumaich (yellow card) 46'; Anderson (yellow card) 55'; Kleiban (yellow card) 83'	Stadium: One Spokane Stadium; Attendance: 1,732; Referee: Trevor Wiseman

April 11 7	Spokane Velocity	3–1	Richmond Kickers	Spokane, Washington
6:00 PM PDT	Alexandre 11'; Denton 16'; Gallardo (yellow card) 54'; John-Brown 57'; Fernandez (yellow card) 79'	Report	Pannholzer 34'	Stadium: One Spokane Stadium; Attendance: 1,756; Referee: Edson Carvajal

May 2 8	Corpus Christi FC	0–0	Spokane Velocity	Corpus Christi, Texas
5:30 PM PDT	Chaney (yellow card) 37'; Dietrich (yellow card) 59'	Report	Veidman (yellow card) 31'	Stadium: Cabaniss Athletic Complex; Attendance: 750; Referee: Servando Berna Rico

May 10 9	Spokane Velocity	2–1	FC Naples	Spokane, Washington
3:00 PM PDT	Alexandre 8'; John-Brown (yellow card) 28'; Lewis (yellow card) 36'; Peláez 54' (pen.)	Report	Mastrantonio 90+5'	Stadium: One Spokane Stadium; Attendance: 1,948; Referee: Muhammad Kaleia

May 24 10	Spokane Velocity	1–0	Sarasota Paradise	Spokane, Washington
4:00 PM PDT	Margvelashvili (yellow card) 59'; Waldeck 72'; Lewis (yellow card) 81'	Report	McLaughlin (yellow card) 26'; Rodriguez (yellow card) 77'	Stadium: One Spokane Stadium; Attendance: 2,016; Referee: Felix Granados

May 30 11	Portland Hearts of Pine	2–1	Spokane Velocity	Portland, Maine
3:30 PM PDT	Camara 62'; Varela (yellow card) 71'; Kamara 80'	Report	Fernandez (yellow card) 21'; John-Brown 45+2'; Veidman (yellow card) 85'	Stadium: Fitzpatrick Stadium; Attendance: 6,256; Referee: Igor Bych

June 13 12	AV Alta FC	1–0	Spokane Velocity	Lancaster, California
8:00 PM PDT	Pajaro (yellow card) 41'; Kleiban (yellow card) 57'; Higareda (yellow card) 60'; Pehlivanov (yellow card) 64'; Lay (yellow card) 69'; Anderson 79'	Report	Margvelashvili (yellow card) 90+3'	Stadium: Lancaster Municipal Stadium; Attendance: 2,813; Referee: Ivan de Cristofaro

June 20 13	Spokane Velocity	0–4	One Knoxville SC	Spokane, Washington
6:00 PM PDT	Covi (yellow card) 49'; Miller (yellow card) 61'	Report	McRobb 33' (yellow card) 78'; Baker 37'; Linhares 56'; Perkins (yellow card) 70'; Gøling 74'	Stadium: One Spokane Stadium; Attendance: 1,857; Referee: Ekaterina Koroleva

June 24 14	Spokane Velocity	2–1	Westchester SC	Spokane, Washington
6:00 PM PDT	Lewis 38'; Veidman (yellow card) 45+5'; Gil 54'; Fernandez (yellow card) 56'	Report	Diaz 4'	Stadium: One Spokane Stadium; Attendance: 1,925; Referee: Muhammad Hassan

July 1 15	Spokane Velocity	0–1	Forward Madison FC	Spokane, Washington
6:00 PM PDT	Covi (yellow card) 85'	Report	Segbers (yellow card) 2'; Margvelashvili 31' (o.g.); Edwards (yellow card) 72'; Karamoko (yellow card) 85'; Gyamfi (yellow card) 90+3'	Stadium: One Spokane Stadium; Attendance: 1,748; Referee: Justin St. Pierre

July 4 16	Fort Wayne FC	3–0	Spokane Velocity	Fort Wayne, Indiana
4:30 PM PDT	Healy 14'; Smith (yellow card) 16'; Gafar (yellow card) 38'; Garay 44'; Ricol 48' (pen.); Nieto (yellow card) 90+2'	Report		Stadium: Fort Wayne FC Park; Attendance: 4,493; Referee: Joe Surgan

July 18 17	Richmond Kickers	0–2	Spokane Velocity	Richmond, Virginia
4:36 PM PDT	O'Malley (yellow card) 57'	Report	Gallegos 10' (o.g.); Covi 30'; Vinyals (yellow card) 42'; Denton (yellow card) 90+5'	Stadium: City Stadium; Attendance: 3,043
Note: Match was delayed 36 minutes until 4:36 PM PT because of weather.

July 22 18	Spokane Velocity	3–0	Charlotte Independence	Spokane, Washington
6:00 PM PDT	Veidman (yellow card) 45+7'; Gil 53' (pen.); Gallardo 72'; Lewis (yellow card) 80'; Vinyals 88'	Report	Amaya (yellow card) 36'; Marou (yellow card) 90+3'	Stadium: One Spokane Stadium; Attendance: 1,496; Referee: Jakob Larson

July 25 19	Spokane Velocity	3–1	Fort Wayne FC	Spokane, Washington
6:00 PM PDT	Mensah (yellow card) 21'; Vinyals (yellow card) 58'; John-Brown 66', 81' (yellow card) 81'; Gil 84'	Report	Thomas 15'; Armas (yellow card) 74'; Becher (yellow card) 74'; Jordan (yellow card) 83'	Stadium: One Spokane Stadium; Attendance: 1,857; Referee: Elorm Atisu

August 1 20	Chattanooga Red Wolves SC	P–P	Spokane Velocity	East Ridge, Tennessee
4:00 PM PDT				Stadium: CHI Memorial Stadium
Note: match was abandoned due to weather.

August 8 21	New York Cosmos	P–P	Spokane Velocity	Paterson, New Jersey
4:00 PM PDT				Stadium: Hinchliffe Stadium
Note: match was postponed due to weather.

August 15 22	Spokane Velocity	2–3	Corpus Christi FC	Spokane, Washington
6:30 PM PDT	Brett 11'; Spielman (yellow card) 48'; Veidman (yellow card) 59'; Fernandez (yellow card) 65'; Vinyals 70' (yellow card) 90'	Report	Keaney 57'; Abeal (yellow card) 72'; Medina 81'; Cerritos (yellow card) 89'; Keegan 90+6' (yellow card) 90+6'	Stadium: One Spokane Stadium; Attendance: 1,231; Referee: Dion Coxe-Trieger

August 22 23	Spokane Velocity	2–1	Greenville Triumph SC	Spokane, Washington
6:00 PM PDT	Bubb 27' (o.g.); Opara 30'; Covi (yellow card) 73'; S. Lewis (yellow card) 81'; A. Lewis (yellow card) 90+4'; Miller (yellow card) 90+6'	Report	Seagrist (yellow card) 34'; Patti 55'	Stadium: One Spokane Stadium; Attendance: 1,155; Referee: Braeden Fray

August 29 24	Westchester SC	1–3	Spokane Velocity	Mount Vernon, New York
4:00 PM PDT	Guezen 14'; Bouman (yellow card) 49'; Diaz (yellow card) 90+5'	Report	Brett 17' (pen.); Waldeck (yellow card) 29'; John-Brown 44'; Lewis 72'	Stadium: The Stadium at Memorial Field; Attendance: 1,730; Referee: Stephen Foster

September 5 25	Sarasota Paradise	1–1	Spokane Velocity	Lakewood Ranch, Florida
4:30 PM PDT	Bryant 21'; Rosa (yellow card) 45+5'	Report	John-Brown (yellow card) 45+6'; Hernández 90+4'	Stadium: Premier Sports Campus; Attendance: 1,558; Referee: John Tamayo

September 13 26	Spokane Velocity	v	South Georgia Tormenta FC	Spokane, Washington
4:00 PM PDT				Stadium: One Spokane Stadium
Note: Game cancelled following South Georgia Tormenta FC's withdrawal from USL League One.

September 16 27	Union Omaha	3–1	Spokane Velocity	Omaha, Nebraska
10:00 AM PDT	Wootton 6' (yellow card) 66'; Gómez 10'; Cáceres (yellow card) 62'; Cabral 90+3'	Report	Covi (red card) 41'; Veidman (yellow card) 53'; Spielman 67' (yellow card) 78'	Stadium: Morrison Stadium; Attendance: 2,648; Referee: Anthony Almeida

September 20 28	Spokane Velocity	2–2	Athletic Club Boise	Spokane, Washington
4:00 PM PDT	Gil 48'; Waldeck 50'; Opara (yellow card) 62'; Speilman (yellow card) 88'	Report	Barea 29' (pen.), 45+1'; Crull (yellow card) 68'	Stadium: One Spokane Stadium; Attendance: 2,677; Referee: Jaclyn Metz

September 26 29	Forward Madison FC	0–1	Spokane Velocity	Madison, Wisconsin
3:00 PM PDT	McCamy (yellow card) 48'; Glaeser (yellow card) 53'; Carmichael (yellow card) 83'	Report	Peláez (yellow card) 57'; Denton 73'; Speilman (yellow card) 83'	Stadium: Breese Stevens Field; Attendance: 4,235; Referee: Jorge Escobar

September 30 20	Chattanooga Red Wolves SC	0–1	Spokane Velocity	East Ridge, Tennessee
4:00 PM PDT	Clapier (yellow card) 14'; Hallenberger (yellow card) 83'	Report	Alexandre (yellow card) 3'; Brett 51' (yellow card) 90+1'; Opara (yellow card) 55'	Stadium: CHI Memorial Stadium; Attendance: 1,022; Referee: Amin Hadzic
Note: match was originally abandoned due to weather with Chattanooga winning 1–0 at the 10th minute.

October 3 30	Spokane Velocity	3–3	Portland Hearts of Pine	Spokane, Washington
6:00 PM PDT	Vinyals 38' (yellow card) 75'; Brett 39'; Hernández (yellow card) 45+3'; Lewis 45+3'; Mensah (yellow card) 86'; Spielman (yellow card) 90+7'	Report	Gonzalez (yellow card) 62' (goal) 90+8' (pen.); Rodriguez-Gentile 64'; Camara 73'	Stadium: One Spokane Stadium; Attendance: 2,014; Referee: Trevor Wiseman

October 11 31	One Knoxville SC	0–2	Spokane Velocity	Knoxville, Tennessee
12:00 PM PDT	Zarokostas (yellow card) 29'; Murphy (yellow card) 48'; Baker (yellow card) 81'	Report	John-Brown 18'; Miller (yellow card) 25'; Lewis (yellow card) 45'; Brett 62'; Gil (yellow card) 90'	Stadium: Covenant Health Park; Attendance: 4,015; Referee: Kevin Broadley

October 14 32	Greenville Triumph SC	4–3	Spokane Velocity	Mauldin, South Carolina
4:00 PM PDT	Agyaakwah 4'; Speilman 10' (o.g.); Patti 51'; Sims (yellow card) 52'; Boyce 76'	Report	Elmasnaouy 31', 87' (yellow card) 90+7'; Gil 72' (pen.); Miller (yellow card) 75'	Stadium: GE Vernova Park; Attendance: 2,433; Referee: John Matto

October 17 33	Spokane Velocity	1–0	Chattanooga Red Wolves SC	Spokane, Washington
6:00 PM PDT	Mensah (yellow card) 63'; Gil (yellow card) 67'; Veidman (yellow card) 67'; Waldeck (yellow card) 77'; Vinyals 90'	Report	Vaughan (yellow card) 63'	Stadium: One Spokane Stadium; Attendance: 2,258; Referee: Deny Kulasinac

October 21 21	New York Cosmos	3–3	Spokane Velocity	Paterson, New Jersey
4:36 PM PDT	Koffi 26'; Materazzi (yellow card) 31'; Jawneh (yellow card) 39'; Chan (yellow card) 56'; Ramos (yellow card) 56' (goal) 83'; Jawneh 59'	Report	Brett 57' (pen.); Lewis 69'; Spielman (yellow card) 77'; Gallardo (yellow card) 85'; John-Brown 90+10'	Stadium: Hinchliffe Stadium; Attendance: 813; Referee: Atahan Yaya
Note: match was originally postponed due to weather, then delayed for 36 minutes.

October 24 34	FC Naples	1–0	Spokane Velocity	Naples, Florida
4:00 PM PDT	Mastrantonio (yellow card) 7'; Cisneros (yellow card) 41'; Osorio (yellow card) 81'; Ferrín 90+4'	Report	Alexandre (yellow card) 31'; Opara (yellow card) 39'; Miller (yellow card) 84'	Stadium: Paradise Coast Sports Complex; Attendance: 3,217; Referee: Benjamin Meyer

=== Playoffs ===
October 30 Quarterfinals	Forward Madison FC	2–1	Spokane Velocity	Madison, Wisconsin
3:30 PM PDT	Karamoko 8'; Bolma 12'; McCamy (yellow card) 48'; Torres (yellow card) 80'; Munjoma (yellow card) 88'	Report	Opara 11'; Lewis (yellow card) 30'; Elmasnaouy (yellow card) 45+1'	Stadium: Breese Stevens Field; Attendance: 3,192; Referee: Alexandra Billeter

=== Lamar Hunt US Open Cup ===
March 17 First Round	Ventura County Fusion	1–2	Spokane Velocity	Ventura, California
7:30 PM PST	Fofanah 79' (pen.); Guerra (yellow card) 80'; Alsakati (yellow card) 86'; McCune (yellow card) 87'	Report	Peláez 20'; Mensah (yellow card) 77'; Gallardo 89' (pen.)	Stadium: Ventura College Stadium; Attendance: 300; Referee: Felix Granados

April 1 Second Round	Colorado Springs Switchbacks	1–1 (a.e.t.) (4–2 p)	Spokane Velocity	Colorado Springs, Colorado
5:00 PM PT	Maples 45'; Metusala (yellow card) 105+3'	Report	Peláez (yellow card) 32'; Hernández (yellow card) 72'; Booth 87'	Stadium: Weidner Field; Attendance: 1,613; Referee: Drew Klemp
	Penalties
	Bennett (penalty scored); Perez (penalty scored); Maples (penalty missed); Hanya (penalty scored); Masereka (penalty scored)		(penalty missed) Peláez; (penalty missed) Fitch; (penalty scored) Hernández; (penalty scored) Lewis

=== USL Cup ===
April 25 Group Stage	Sacramento Republic FC	4–0	Spokane Velocity	Sacramento, California
7:00 PM PDT	Wolff 5'; Desmond (yellow card) 16'; Malango (yellow card) 40' (goal) 45+4', 56'; Benítez (yellow card) 45' (goal) 81'; Kleemann (yellow card) 64'; Edwards (yellow card) 77'	Report	Alexandre (yellow card) 19'; Gallardo (yellow card) 75'; Meredith (yellow card) 90+4'	Stadium: Heart Health Park; Attendance: 9,115; Referee: Carlos Rodriguez

May 17 Group Stage	Spokane Velocity	1–0	Las Vegas Lights FC	Spokane, Washington
4:00 PM PDT	Vinyals 7'; Alexandre (red card) 52'; Margvelashvili (yellow card) 57'; Covi (yellow card) 63'; Veidman (yellow card) 64'	Report	Scott (yellow card) 5'; Okyere (yellow card) 71'; Ofeimu (yellow card) 90+5'	Stadium: One Spokane Stadium; Attendance: 1,833; Referee: Steven Cardozo

June 6 Group Stage	Spokane Velocity	2–1	Athletic Club Boise	Spokane, Washington
6:00 PM PDT	Margvelashvili (yellow card) 38'; Veidman (yellow card) 65'; Miller 71'; Lewis 74'	Report	Amang (yellow card) 41'; Crull (yellow card) 50'; Kostyshyn (yellow card) 66'; Lewis 76' (o.g.)	Stadium: One Spokane Stadium; Attendance: 2,325; Referee: Christian Campo

July 11 Group Stage	Oakland Roots SC	1–3	Spokane Velocity	Oakland, California
12:00 PM PDT	Hackshaw 2'	Report	Brett (yellow card) 9' (goal) 34', 55'; Peláez 90+4'	Stadium: Merritt College Soccer Stadium; Attendance: 1,474; Referee: Brad Jensen

August 12, 2026 Quarterfinals	Spokane Velocity	1–1 (4–5 p)	Colorado Springs Switchbacks FC	Spokane, Washington
6:00 PM PDT	Gil 14'; Denton (yellow card) 43'; Veidman (yellow card)	Report	Fjeldberg 30'; Herrera (yellow card)	Stadium: ONE Spokane Stadium; Attendance: 972; Referee: Brandon Stevis
	Penalties
	Vinyals (penalty scored); Gallardo (penalty scored); Lewis (penalty scored); Brett (penalty scored); Covi (penalty missed)		(penalty scored) Perez; (penalty scored) Tejada; (penalty scored) Maples; (penalty scored) Masereka; (penalty scored) Bennett

=== Appearances and goals ===
No.	Pos	Nat	Player	Total		USL League One		Lamar Hunt US Open Cup		USL Cup		USL League One Playoffs	
No.	Pos	Nat	Player	Apps	Goals	Apps	Goals	Apps	Goals	Apps	Goals	Apps	Goals
1	GK	(United States) USA	Sean Lewis	29	0	23+0	0	2+0	0	3+0	0	1+0	0
3	DF	(United States) USA	Nick Spielman	23	1	16+2	1	0+2	0	0+2	0	1+0	0
4	DF	(United States) USA	Simon Fitch	29	0	17+6	0	0+2	0	4+0	0	0+0	0
5	DF	(Georgia (country)) GEO	Gagi Margvelashvili	22	0	9+7	0	2+0	0	3+0	0	0+1	0
6	MF	(Peru) PER	Collin Fernandez	29	0	20+4	0	0+0	0	4+1	0	0+0	0
7	DF	(United States) USA	Joe Gallardo	26	3	12+8	2	1+1	1	2+1	0	0+1	0
8	MF	(Spain) ESP	Nil Vinyals	39	6	17+14	5	2+0	0	2+3	1	1+0	0
9	FW	(Jamaica) JAM	Neco Brett	32	9	18+8	7	0+1	0	3+1	2	1+0	0
10	MF	(United States) USA	Luis Gil	35	7	21+8	6	1+0	0	4+1	1	0+0	0
11	FW	(Grenada) GRN	Shavon John-Brown	31	8	22+3	8	1+0	0	4+0	0	1+0	0
12	DF	(United States) USA	Camron Miller	38	1	29+1	0	2+0	0	5+0	1	1+0	0
13	DF	(Nigeria) NGR	Lucky Opara	23	2	15+4	1	1+0	0	1+1	0	1+0	1
14	MF	(United States) USA	Mark Hernández	17	1	4+11	1	0+1	0	0+1	0	0+0	0
16	FW	(Colombia) COL	Anuar Peláez	19	3	7+7	1	2+0	1	1+2	1	0+0	0
17	FW	(Canada) CAN	Medgy Alexandre	34	2	22+6	2	1+0	0	4+0	0	0+1	0
18	DF	(United States) USA	Derek Waldeck	34	2	21+7	2	0+1	0	3+1	0	1+0	0
19	MF	(England) ENG	Jack Denton	21	3	10+7	3	2+0	0	1+1	0	0+0	0
20	DF	(France) FRA	Ibrahim Covi	20	1	11+5	1	0+0	0	2+2	0	0+0	0
22	MF	(United States) USA	Rocky Wells	6	0	1+2	0	1+0	0	0+2	0	0+0	0
23	GK	(Mexico) MEX	Carlos Merancio	11	0	9+0	0	0+0	0	2+0	0	0+0	0
24	MF	(United States) USA	Nathan Donovan	2	0	0+2	0	0+0	0	0+0	0	0+0	0
33	DF	(Ghana) GHA	Moses Mensah	36	0	18+11	0	2+0	0	2+2	0	1+0	0
34	MF	(United States) USA	Ali Elmasnaouy	11	2	9+1	2	0+0	0	0+0	0	1+0	0
37	GK	(United States) USA	Jackson Buck	0	0	0+0	0	0+0	0	0+0	0	0+0	0
42	MF	(United States) USA	Bryce Meredith	5	0	0+4	0	0+0	0	0+1	0	0+0	0
77	MF	(Jamaica) JAM	Andre Lewis	38	5	19+11	4	2+0	0	5+0	1	1+0	0
80	MF	(Jamaica) JAM	Andrew Booth	4	2	2+1	1	0+1	1	0+0	0	0+0	0

=== Top goalscorers ===
Rank	Position	Number	Name	USL1 Season	U.S. Open Cup	USL Cup	USL League One Playoffs	Total
1	FW	9	(Jamaica) Neco Brett	7	0	2	0	9
2	FW	11	(Grenada) Shavon John-Brown	8	0	0	0	8
3	MF	10	(United States) Luis Gil	6	0	1	0	7
4	MF	8	(Spain) Nil Vinyals	5	0	1	0	6
5	MF	77	(Jamaica) Andre Lewis	4	0	1	0	5
6			Own Goals	3	0	0	0	3
6	MF	19	(England) Jack Denton	3	0	0	0	3
6	DF	7	(United States) Joe Gallardo	2	1	0	0	3
6	FW	16	(Colombia) Anuar Peláez	1	1	1	0	3
10	FW	16	(Canada) Medgy Alexandre	2	0	0	0	2
10	DF	18	(United States) Derek Waldeck	2	0	0	0	2
10	MF	34	(United States) Ali Elmasnaouy	2	0	0	0	2
10	MF	80	(Jamaica) Andrew Booth	1	1	0	0	2
10	DF	13	(Nigeria) Lucky Opara	1	0	0	1	2
15	DF	2	(United States) Nick Spielman	1	0	0	0	1
15	MF	14	(United States) Mark Hernández	1	0	0	0	1
15	DF	20	(France) Ibrahim Covi	1	0	0	0	1
15	DF	12	(United States) Camron Miller	0	0	1	0	1
Total				50	3	7	1	61

=== Assist scorers ===
Rank	Position	Number	Name	USL1 Season	U.S. Open Cup	USL Cup	USL League One Playoffs	Total
1	DF	13	(Nigeria) Lucky Opara	5	0	0	0	5
1	MF	19	(England) Jack Denton	5	0	0	0	5
3	DF	7	(United States) Joe Gallardo	4	0	0	0	4
3	FW	11	(Grenada) Shavon John-Brown	3	1	0	0	4
3	DF	18	(United States) Derek Waldeck	3	0	1	0	4
3	MF	8	(Spain) Nil Vinyals	3	0	0	1	4
3	MF	10	(United States) Luis Gil	2	0	2	0	4
8	DF	4	(United States) Simon Fitch	3	0	0	0	3
8	FW	9	(Jamaica) Neco Brett	2	0	1	0	3
10	MF	6	(Peru) Collin Fernandez	1	0	0	0	1
10	DF	12	(United States) Camron Miller	1	0	0	0	1
10	FW	16	(Colombia) Anuar Peláez	1	0	0	0	1
10	DF	18	(United States) Derek Waldeck	1	0	0	0	1
10	MF	77	(Jamaica) Andre Lewis	1	0	0	0	1
10	FW	7	(United States) Joe Gallardo	0	1	0	0	1
Total				36	2	4	1	43

=== Clean sheets ===
Rank	Name	USL1 Season	U.S. Open Cup	USL Cup	USL League One Playoffs	Total
1	(United States) Sean Lewis	3	0	1	0	4
2	(Mexico) Carlos Merancio	2	0	0	0	2
Total		5	1	0	0	6

=== Disciplinary record ===
No.	Pos.	Player	USL League One Regular Season			Lamar Hunt US Open Cup			USL Cup			USL League One Playoffs			Total		
No.	Pos.	Player	Yellow card	(yellow card) (yellow-red card)	Red card	Yellow card	(yellow card) (yellow-red card)	Red card	Yellow card	(yellow card) (yellow-red card)	Red card	Yellow card	(yellow card) (yellow-red card)	Red card	Yellow card	(yellow card) (yellow-red card)	Red card
1	GK	(United States) Sean Lewis	1	0	0	0	0	0	0	0	0	0	0	0	1	0	0
3	DF	(United States) Nick Spielman	7	0	0	0	0	0	0	0	0	0	0	0	7	0	0
4	DF	(United States) Simon Fitch	0	0	0	0	0	0	0	0	0	0	0	0	0	0	0
5	DF	(Georgia (country)) Gagi Margvelashvili	3	0	0	0	0	0	2	0	0	0	0	0	5	0	0
6	MF	(Peru) Collin Fernandez	4	0	0	0	0	0	0	0	0	0	0	0	4	0	0
7	DF	(United States) Joe Gallardo	3	0	0	0	0	0	1	0	0	0	0	0	4	0	0
8	MF	(Spain) Nil Vinyals	5	0	0	0	0	0	0	0	0	0	0	0	5	0	0
9	FW	(Jamaica) Neco Brett	1	0	0	0	0	0	1	0	0	0	0	0	2	0	0
10	MF	(United States) Luis Gil	2	0	0	0	0	0	0	0	0	0	0	0	2	0	0
11	FW	(Grenada) Shavon John-Brown	3	0	0	0	0	0	0	0	0	0	0	0	3	0	0
12	DF	(United States) Camron Miller	6	0	0	0	0	0	0	0	0	0	0	0	6	0	0
13	DF	(Nigeria) Lucky Opara	3	0	0	0	0	0	0	0	0	0	0	0	3	0	0
14	MF	(United States) Mark Hernández	2	0	0	1	0	0	0	0	0	0	0	0	3	0	0
16	MF	(Colombia) Anuar Peláez	2	0	0	1	0	0	0	0	0	0	0	0	3	0	0
17	MF	(Canada) Medgy Alexandre	2	0	0	0	0	0	1	0	1	0	0	0	3	0	1
18	DF	(United States) Derek Waldeck	3	0	0	0	0	0	0	0	0	0	0	0	3	0	0
19	MF	(England) Jack Denton	1	0	0	0	0	0	1	0	0	0	0	0	2	0	0
20	DF	(France) Ibrahim Covi	3	0	1	0	0	0	1	0	0	0	0	0	4	0	1
22	FW	(United States) Rocky Wells	0	0	0	0	0	0	0	0	0	0	0	0	0	0	0
23	GK	(Mexico) Carlos Merancio	1	0	0	0	0	0	0	0	0	0	0	0	1	0	0
33	DF	(Ghana) Moses Mensah	3	0	0	1	0	0	0	0	0	0	0	0	4	0	0
34	MF	(United States) Ali Elmasnaouy	1	0	0	0	0	0	0	0	0	1	0	0	2	0	0
42	DF	(United States) Bryce Meredith	0	0	0	0	0	0	1	0	0	0	0	0	1	0	0
77	MF	(Jamaica) Andre Lewis	6	0	0	0	0	0	0	0	0	1	0	0	7	0	0
80	MF	(Jamaica) Andrew Booth	1	0	0	0	0	0	0	0	0	0	0	0	1	0	0
	Head Coach	(England) Leigh Veidman	7	0	0	0	0	0	3	0	0	0	0	0	10	0	0
Total			70	0	1	3	0	0	11	0	1	2	0	0	86	0	2

== Awards and Honors ==
=== USL League One Annual Awards ===
==== USL League One All-League Team honorees ====
Player	Team	Position	Ref
(United States) Camron Miller	Second	DF	
(Grenada) Shavon John-Brown	Second	FW	

=== Weekly Awards ===
==== USL League One Team of the Week ====
Week	Player	Opponent	Position	Ref
2	(Mexico) Carlos Merancio	Union Omaha	Bench	
3	(Grenada) Shavon John-Brown	New York Cosmos	MF	
3	(England) Jack Denton	New York Cosmos	MF	
3	(Jamaica) Neco Brett	New York Cosmos	FW	
3	(United States) Simon Fitch	New York Cosmos	Bench	
3	(United States) Luis Gil	New York Cosmos	Bench	
6	(Ghana) Moses Mensah	AV Alta FC and Richmond Kickers	DF	
6	(England) Jack Denton	AV Alta FC and Richmond Kickers	MF	
6	(Grenada) Shavon John-Brown	AV Alta FC and Richmond Kickers	FW	
6	(England) Leigh Veidman	AV Alta FC and Richmond Kickers	Coach	
6	(Nigeria) Lucky Opara	AV Alta FC and Richmond Kickers	Bench	
6	(Spain) Nil Vinyals	AV Alta FC and Richmond Kickers	Bench	
10	(Colombia) Anuar Peláez	FC Naples	FW	
11/12	(Peru) Collin Fernandez	Sarasota Paradise	MF	
11/12	(United States) Sean Lewis	Sarasota Paradise	Bench	
13	(Jamaica) Andre Lewis	Portland Hearts of Pine	MF	
13	(Grenada) Shavon John-Brown	Portland Hearts of Pine	Bench	
19/20	(United States) Sean Lewis	Richmond Kickers	GK	
19/20	(France) Ibrahim Covi	Richmond Kickers	DF	
19/20	(United States) Camron Miller	Richmond Kickers	Bench	
21	(United States) Luis Gil	Charlotte Independence and Fort Wayne FC	MF	
21	(Grenada) Shavon John-Brown	Fort Wayne FC	FW	
21	(England) Leigh Veidman	Charlotte Independence and Fort Wayne FC	Head Coach	
21	(United States) Sean Lewis	Charlotte Independence and Fort Wayne FC	Bench	
21	(United States) Simon Fitch	Charlotte Independence and Fort Wayne FC	Bench	
25	(Nigeria) Lucky Opara	Greenville Triumph SC	DF	
26	(Grenada) Shavon John-Brown	Westchester SC	MF	
26	(England) Jack Denton	Westchester SC	Bench	
30	(Nigeria) Lucky Opara	Forward Madison FC	DF	
30	(England) Jack Denton	Forward Madison FC	MF	
30	(United States) Sean Lewis	Forward Madison FC	Bench	
31	(Jamaica) Andre Lewis	Chattanooga Red Wolves SC and Portland Hearts of Pine	MF	
31	(Spain) Nil Vinyals	Portland Hearts of Pine	MF	
31	(Jamaica) Neco Brett	Chattanooga Red Wolves SC and Portland Hearts of Pine	FW	
32	(Nigeria) Lucky Opara	One Knoxville SC	DF	
32	(Jamaica) Andre Lewis	One Knoxville SC	Bench	
33	(United States) Ali Elmasnaouy	Greenville Triumph SC and Chattanooga Red Wolves SC	MF	
34	(Grenada) Shavon John-Brown	New York Cosmos and FC Naples	MF	
34	(Jamaica) Andre Lewis	New York Cosmos and FC Naples	Bench	

==== USL League One Player of the Week ====
Week	Player	Opponent	Position	Ref
21	(Grenada) Shavon John-Brown	Fort Wayne FC	FW	
31	(Spain) Nil Vinyals	Portland Hearts of Pine	MF	

==== USL League One Goal of the Week ====
Week	Player	Opponent	Ref
3	(England) Jack Denton	New York Cosmos	

=== USL Cup Awards ===
==== Prinx Tires USL Cup Team of the Round ====
Week	Player	Opponent	Position	Ref
2	(Spain) Nil Vinyals	Las Vegas Lights FC	Bench	
3	(Jamaica) Andre Lewis	Athletic Club Boise	MF	
4	(United States) Luis Gil	Oakland Roots SC	MF	
4	(Jamaica) Neco Brett	Oakland Roots SC	FW	

==== Prinx Tires USL Cup Player of the Round ====
Week	Player	Opponent	Position	Ref
4	(Jamaica) Neco Brett	Oakland Roots SC	FW	

==== Prinx Tires USL Cup Team of the Tournament ====
Player	Position	Ref
(United States) Camron Miller	Bench	
