= USS St. Mary's =

USS St. Mary's or USS St. Marys has been the name of more than one United States Navy ship, and may refer to:

- USS St. Mary's (1798), a galley built in 1798 and transferred to the United States Revenue Cutter Service in 1801
- USS St. Mary's (1844), a sloop-of-war in commission from 1844 to 1873
- St. Mary's (SP-1457), a patrol boat in service from 1917 to 1918
- USS St. Mary's (APA-126), an attack transport in commission from 1944 to 1946

== See also ==
- St. Mary's, was a side-wheeled steamer acquired by the U.S. Navy and renamed USS Hatteras in 1861
- CSS St. Mary, a Confederate States Navy ship captured in 1863 by Union forces and commissioned into the U.S. Navy as USS Alexandria
- USS St. Mary's River
