= Mike Avery =

American athletic director, soccer coach, and former player

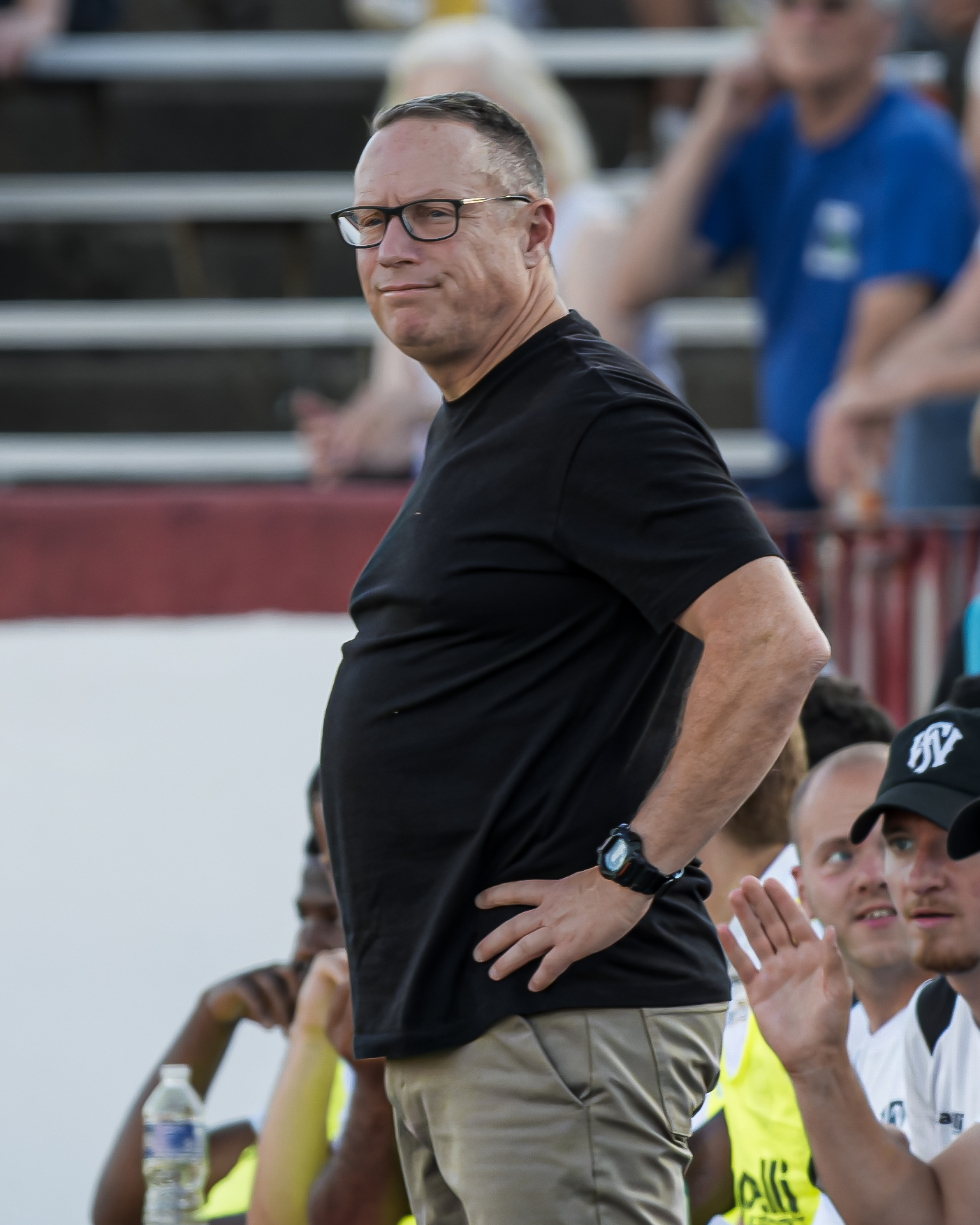
- Avery coaching Fort Wayne FC in 2026
- Born: September 19, 1968 (age 58); San Jose, California, United States
- Education: Westmont College (BA); Midwestern State University (MS)
- Occupations: Athletic director, soccer coach and player
Association football career
- Positions: Midfielder; forward
Team information
- Current team: Fort Wayne FC (head coach)
Youth career
- 1972–19??: Las Pulgas
College career
Years	Team	Apps	(Gls)
1986–1989	Westmont Warriors	92	(25)
Senior career*
Years	Team	Apps	(Gls)
1990	Real Santa Barbara		
1991–1993	Askims IK		
- Indiana Invaders
Managerial career
- 1994–1996: Bethel Pilots
- 1996: Bethel Pilots (women)
- 1997–1999: Cal State San Bernardino Coyotes
- 1998–1999: Cal State San Bernardino Coyotes (women)
- 2000-2005: Notre Dame Fighting Irish (Assistant)
- 2006: Louisville Cardinals (Assistant)
- 2007–2019: Valparaiso Crusaders
- 2020–: Fort Wayne FC
- 2024: Trine Thunder (interim)
- * Club domestic league appearances and goals
- Coaching career

Current position
- Title: Athletic director

Administrative career (AD unless noted)
- 2021: Calumet College of St. Joseph

Mike Avery (born September 19, 1968) is an American athletic director, soccer coach, and former player who played as a midfielder or forward. He is the head coach and sporting director of USL League One club Fort Wayne FC.

A native of San Jose, California, Avery played collegiately at Westmont College. The Warriors won four Golden State Athletic Conference titles during his time at the school and thrice qualified for the National Association of Intercollegiate Athletics tournament. After graduating, he spent four years at the senior level, split between Real Santa Barbara and Askims IK. Avery also had a spell as a player-coach with Indiana Invaders.

Avery went into coaching in 1994, spending three years as the men's head coach at Bethel and being named the first head coach in the history of the Pilots' women's program. He spent three years as the director of soccer at Cal State San Bernardino, coaching both the men's and women's teams at times during that spell. Avery was then an NCAA Division I assistant for the next seven years, spending six years at Notre Dame and one at Louisville. In 2007, Avery was named as the head coach at Valparaiso. He is the all-time winningest head coach in Crusader history, spending 13 years in the position before the program was discontinued by the university. After leaving Valpo, Avery moved to the senior level for the first time and was named as the inaugural head coach in Fort Wayne FC history.

== Playing career ==
=== College ===
Born on September 19, 1968, in San Jose, California, Avery began playing soccer at the age of four with his neighborhood team, Las Pulgas. He went on to play at Westmont College between 1986 and 1989. During his time at the school, the Warriors appeared in the National Association of Intercollegiate Athletics (NAIA) national tournament three times. As a freshman, Avery tallied six goals and six assists in 24 appearances as Westmont won the Golden State Athletic Conference (GSAC) during their first year in the conference. The Warriors repeated as conference champions in 1987, with Avery chipping in seven goals and 11 assists from 21 appearances on his way to an all-GSAC nod. As a junior, he tallied four goals and six assists from 23 games and was again named all-GSAC as Westmont won their third consecutive conference title. He put up eight goals and 11 assists in 24 games as a senior, with the Warriors winning another GSAC title and making a run to the semifinals of the NAIA Tournament. Avery was named an Honorable Mention All-American following the season, capping off a career in which he scored 25 goals in 92 appearances for Westmont and was named to the NAIA All-Far West team four times.

=== Senior career ===
Following his graduation from Westmont, Avery turned professional by signing for Real Santa Barbara in the American Professional Soccer League and played for the club during their final season of existence. After the club folded, Avery moved to Sweden and appeared with Askims IK. In later years, he also spent time in the Premier Development League with Indiana Invaders, playing as well as serving in an undisclosed coaching role with the club.

== Coaching career ==
Avery began his coaching career as an assistant coach at Westmont, his alma mater. Following his time in Sweden, he returned to the United States to pursue a master's degree in kinesiology at Midwestern State University. While studying for the degree, he also served as an assistant coach for the men's soccer team.

=== 1994–1999: Early head coaching jobs ===
In the fall of 1994, Avery was hired to his first head coaching position, getting the job at Bethel College in Indiana. He turned down an offer to be an assistant at Stanford, saying that he wanted "to work in a Christian atmosphere." He spent three seasons in charge of the Pilots, racking up a record of 42–21–4. In Avery's first year, the Pilots finished with a 10-9-1 record, including a 9–0 victory over Lake Erie in his first match in charge. In 1995, the Pilots finished with 15 victories, their most since 1989; Avery was named as the National Christian College Athletic Association (NCCAA) North Central Region Coach of the Year and Mid-Central College Conference (MCCC) Coach of the Year. He repeated as MCCC Coach of the Year in 1996 as the Pilots posted the best record in program history at 17–4–1. Avery also took charge of the Bethel women's soccer team in 1996 as the first head coach in program history.

In 1997, Avery was hired as the director of soccer at California State University, San Bernardino. In his first year with the Coyotes, he was in charge of the men's program. Avery earned his first victory at CSUSB on September 20, after six consecutive losses to start the season, with a 2–1 victory over Midwestern State. During Avery's tenure, the Coyote men's program improved their record each season. He tallied a record of 17-39-2 during his three years in charge of the team. In both 1998 and 1999, Avery also was the head coach of the women's soccer team at CSUSB. His first victory with the Coyote women came on September 9, 1998, a 2–1 win on the road against Cal State Bakersfield. In both of Avery's seasons in charge, the Coyote women finished with eight victories as he departed with a record of 16–22–2.

=== 2000–2006: Division I assistant roles ===
Following the 1999 season, Avery was offered an assistant coaching position at the University of Notre Dame, on the staff of Mike Berticelli. However, Berticelli died on January 25, 2000, shortly after Avery had resigned at Cal State San Bernardino. Nearly two months later, on March 17, 2000, new Irish head coach Chris Apple officially confirmed that Avery would still be joining the staff at Notre Dame. Avery spent six years at the school, one year under Apple and five years under Bobby Clark. He, Clark, and Brian Wiese were named as the 2004 Big East Conference Coaching Staff of the Year. As a recruiter, Avery helped bring 11 All-Americans to Notre Dame, as well as 2006 Hermann Trophy winner Joseph Lapira. On March 3, 2006, Avery accepted a job as the head assistant and recruiting coordinator at the University of Louisville under head coach Ken Lolla. In his lone season with the Cardinals, Louisville qualified for the Big East Conference Men's Soccer Tournament for the first time in the program's history.

=== 2007–2019: Head coach at Valparaiso ===
On January 18, 2007, Avery was hired as the head coach at Valparaiso University; he became the third coach in the history of the Crusaders men's soccer team. He joined his wife, Carin, at Valpo; she had been on the staff of the Crusaders' volleyball team since 1999. Avery's first match in charge ended in a 2–1 defeat to North Carolina State on August 31; one week later, he earned his first win with Valpo with a 3–0 victory over IPFW. The Crusaders won four matches on the season and did so while conceding 28 goals, the third-fewest allowed in a single season in Valpo history.

In 2008, Avery ran 1,000 miles (1,600 kilometres) in five months to raise money for lights at Eastgate Field and new equipment for the program. That year, the Crusaders picked up their first victory over a ranked program in six seasons, defeating no. 25 Bradley on September 12 at the ProRehab Aces Soccer Classic. The following season, Valpo finished in third place in the Horizon League and tallied a winning record for the first time under Avery, winding up 10–7–2.

After a nine-win season in 2010, Avery and the Crusaders won the 2011 Horizon League regular season title, the school's first team title since joining the conference. After the Crusaders finished 9–6–5, Avery was tabbed as the league's Coach of the Year. The Crusaders ended up with a losing record over the next two seasons, however, finishing with a 6-9-4 record in 2012 and a mark of 5-8-5 in 2013.

In 2014, Valpo received votes in the National Soccer Coaches Association of America national poll, doing so for the first time in school history. That mark came the same week that the Crusaders defeated no. 7 Michigan State by a 1–0 scoreline, the highest-ranked opponent that Valpo had ever beaten. Later that season, Valpo earned a no. 25 ranking in the TopDrawerSoccer.com poll, the first time the Crusaders ever earned a top-25 national ranking. Avery's team went 8-5-6 on the season, with the .579 winning percentage tied as the best mark in program history. That campaign was followed by two more winning seasons, as the Crusaders tallied seven wins in 2015 and tied the school record with a 10-win season in 2016.

Avery became the all-time winningest coach in Crusader history on September 16, 2017. With a 3–2 victory on the road against Drake, he earned his 77th victory and surpassed Mis' Mrak for the Crusader record. Earlier that season, the men's soccer team had played Valparaiso's first game as a member of the Missouri Valley Conference (MVC), tallying a 2–1 victory over Loyola on September 1. In 2018, Avery led the Crusaders to a third-place finish in the MVC regular season; it was the highest conference finish by a Crusader program since joining the Valley.

The Crusaders finished with their worst record under Avery in 2019, ending with a 4-13-1 record. On November 13, Valpo was defeated by Drake in the quarterfinals of the Missouri Valley Conference Men's Soccer Tournament. The 2–1 defeat was the final match in program history. One week later, the university discontinued the men's soccer program. Avery left as the program leader in wins, picking up 91 over his 13 seasons in charge, and led the program to nine of the 10 best defensive seasons in Crusader history.

=== 2020–present: Fort Wayne FC ===
On February 14, 2020, Avery was hired as the first head coach in Fort Wayne FC history. The National Premier Soccer League expansion club had previously agreed to terms with a coach "with past experience playing in the Premier League", but were unable to complete the deal due to visa issues. Avery had previously assisted the club during its open tryouts earlier that year. Before he took charge of a game, the 2020 NPSL season was canceled due to the COVID-19 pandemic, and on October 29 the club announced a move to USL League Two. Fort Wayne's inaugural match took place on May 9, 2021, ending in a 3–0 defeat against Oakland County FC. After opening the season winless in six games, Avery tallied his and the club's first victory on June 11 with a 3–1 win over Toledo Villa. Fort Wayne's inaugural season ended with a 1-8-5 record and an eighth-place finish in the Great Lakes Division. On August 31, the club announced that Avery signed a contract extension as head coach through the 2022 USL League Two season and also appointed him as sporting director.

=== 2024–present: Trine Thunder ===
Avery was named as interim men's head coach for the Trine University Thunder on August 22, 2024.

== Administrative career ==
Avery was named as the athletic director at Calumet College of St. Joseph (CCSJ) on February 26, 2021. Although he had never before held a position in athletic administration, Avery had been a faculty member at Bethel College; California State University, San Bernardino; and Valparaiso University while coaching at those schools. During his time at CCSJ, Avery made one coaching hire: promoting Marcus Jefferson as head coach of the Crimson Wave men's basketball team in May. He also helped the school start a sprint football team as a founding member of the Midwest Sprint Football League. On August 31, 2021, Avery stepped down from his position at CCSJ in order to accept a promotion to sporting director and head coach at Fort Wayne FC. When he was hired at Calumet College, Avery agreed with the school and the soccer club that the sides would sit down at the end of the 2021 USL League Two season and discuss his future path. He decided to continue at Fort Wayne and therefore resigned from his position at CCSJ.

== Personal life ==
Avery's wife, Carin, is the head volleyball coach at Valparaiso. The two met in 1996 when they were both working at Bethel. The couple have two sons: Alex, who was born the day before the Mid-Continent Conference volleyball tournament in 2003, and Kasongo, who was adopted from Africa.

== Career statistics ==
As of July 16, 2022

Managerial record by team and tenure
Team	From	To	Record					
Team	From	To	G	W	L	T	Win %	Ref.
Bethel Pilots	1994	1996	67	42	21	4	62.69	
Cal State San Bernardino Coyotes	August 30, 1997	November 1, 1999	58	17	39	2	29.31	
Cal State San Bernardino Coyotes (women)	September 1, 1998	October 30, 1999	40	16	22	2	40.00	
Valparaiso Crusaders	August 31, 2007	November 13, 2019	242	91	105	46	37.60	
Fort Wayne FC	February 14, 2020	present	28	10	11	7	35.71	
Total			435	176	198	61	40.46	

== Honors ==
Westmont

- Golden State Athletic Conference (regular season): 1986, 1987, 1988, 1989

Valparaiso

- Horizon League (regular season): 2011

Individual

- NAIA All-Far West team: 1986, 1987, 1988, 1989
- All-Golden State Athletic Conference: 1987, 1988
- NAIA Honorable Mention All-America: 1989
- NCCAA North Central Region Coach of the Year: 1995
- Mid-Central College Conference Coach of the Year: 1995, 1996
- Horizon League Coach of the Year: 2011

== See also ==
- List of people from San Jose, California
