= USS Alexandria (1862) =

Gunboat of the United States Navy

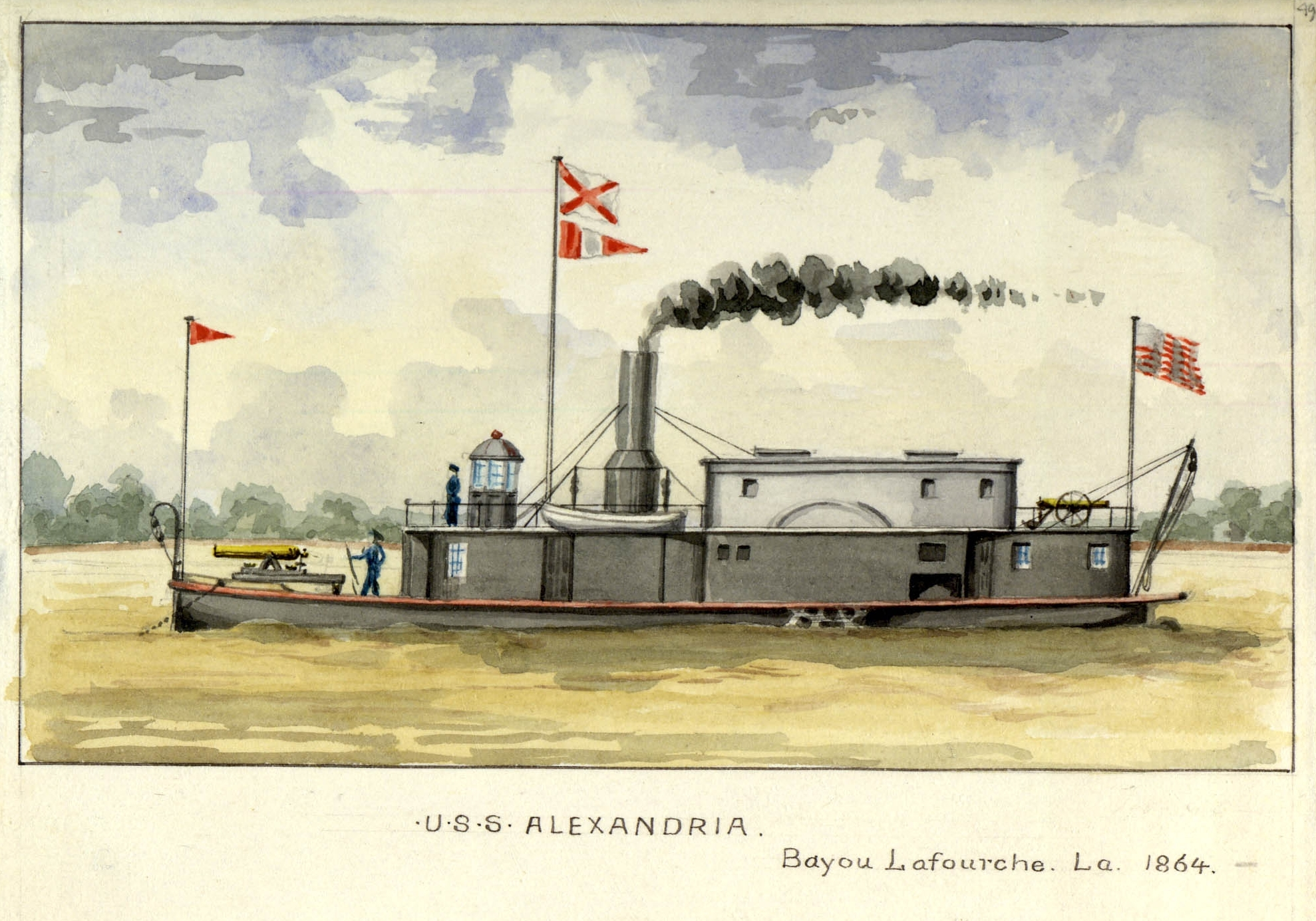
- USS Alexandria by Ens. D. M. N. Stouffer, ca. 1864–65

History

United States
- Ordered: as St. Mary
- Laid down: date unknown
- Launched: date unknown
- Completed: 1862
- Commissioned: 12 December 1863
- Decommissioned: 7 August 1865
- Stricken: 1865 (est.)
- Captured: by Union Navy forces; 13 July 1863
- Fate: Sold, 17 August 1865

General characteristics
- Displacement: 60 tons
- Length: 89 ft 9 in (27.36 m)
- Beam: 15 ft (4.6 m)
- Draft: 4 ft (1.2 m)
- Depth of hold: 5 ft (1.5 m)
- Propulsion: steam engine; side wheel-propelled
- Speed: 3 to 4 knots
- Complement: not known
- Armament: one 24-pounder smoothbore; one 12-pounder field carriage

USS Alexandria was a side-wheel steamer captured by the Union Navy during the American Civil War. She was used by the Union Navy as a dispatch boat in support of the Union Navy blockade of Confederate waterways.

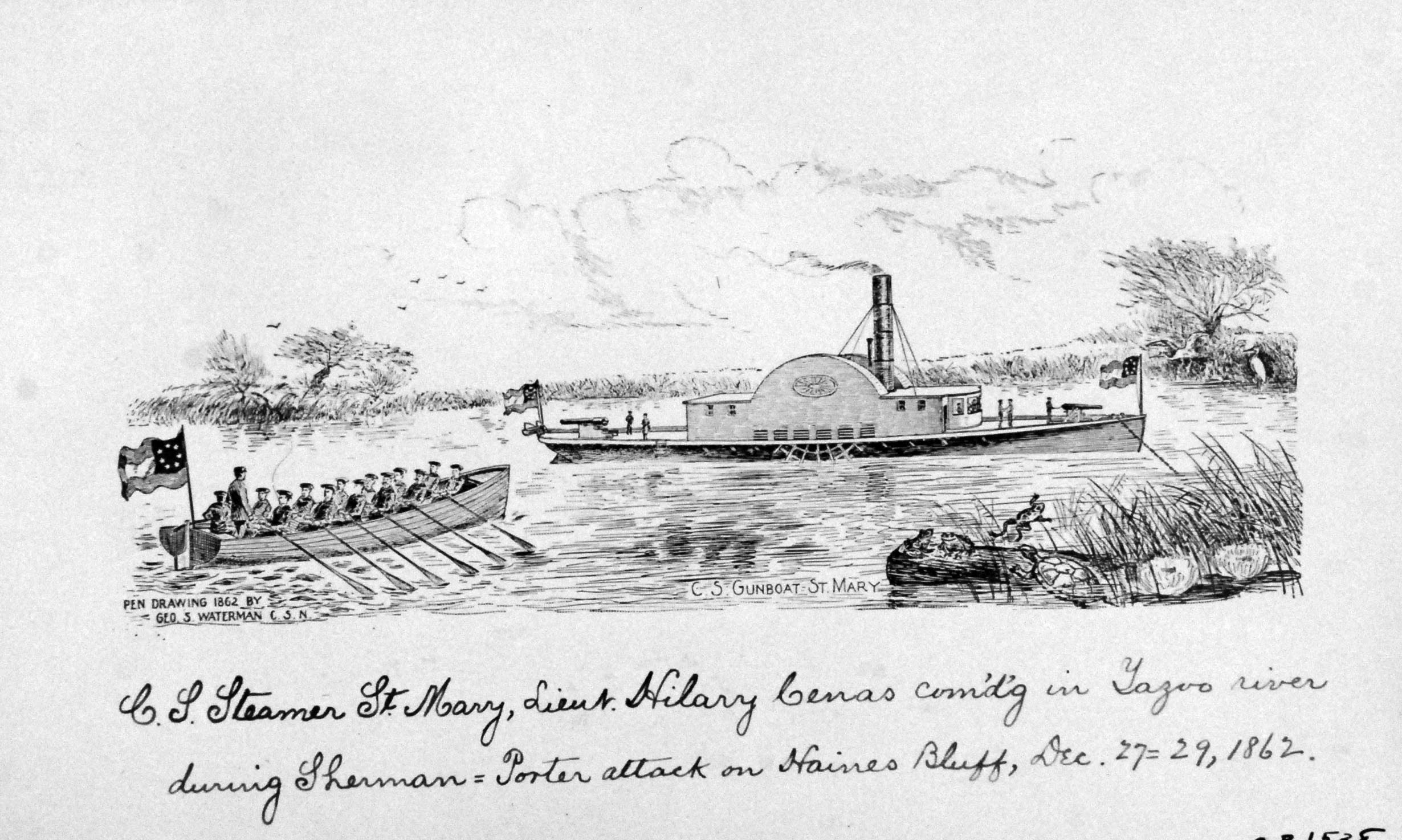
CSS St. Mary.

== Steamer captured and by Union Navy forces ==
St. Mary—a small, wooden-hulled, side-wheel steamer built at Plaquemine, Louisiana—was presented to the Confederate government upon completion early in 1862. Protected by bales of cotton, the vessel operated on the Yazoo and Tallahatchie Rivers for the remainder of that year and into the summer of 1863. On 13 July, a Union joint Army-Navy expedition of four warships and 5,000 troops captured St. Mary at Yazoo City, Mississippi.

== Steamer placed into Union Navy service ==
Although apparently never condemned by a prize court because she was appraised at less than $8,000, St. Mary was taken into the Union Navy. On 18 September 1863, Rear Admiral David Dixon Porter wrote to the Secretary of the Navy, Gideon Welles, requesting permission to retain the prize for naval service and asking that the ship be renamed Yazoo. However, this suggestion was never approved.

== Service with the Mississippi squadron ==
Although surviving records are not conclusive, it seems that after the prize had been repaired, Admiral Porter may have used the steamer in the autumn as a non-commissioned dispatch boat. However, the side-wheeler was placed in commission as Alexandria at Cairo, Illinois, on 12 December 1863.

She served in the 1st District of the Mississippi Squadron and operated between Donaldsonville, Louisiana, and Cairo, Illinois.

== Post-war decommissioning, sale, and subsequent career ==
After the collapse of the Confederacy, the ship was decommissioned at Cairo, Illinois, on 7 August 1865 and sold at auction at Mound City, Illinois, on 17 August 1865 to W. Markham of Baton Rouge, Louisiana. Documented as Alexandria on 4 October 1865, the ship served on the Mississippi River and her tributaries until lost sometime in 1867. No documents containing specific information on her destruction seem to have survived.
