= Bernd Schipmann =

German–Filipino footballer (born 1994)

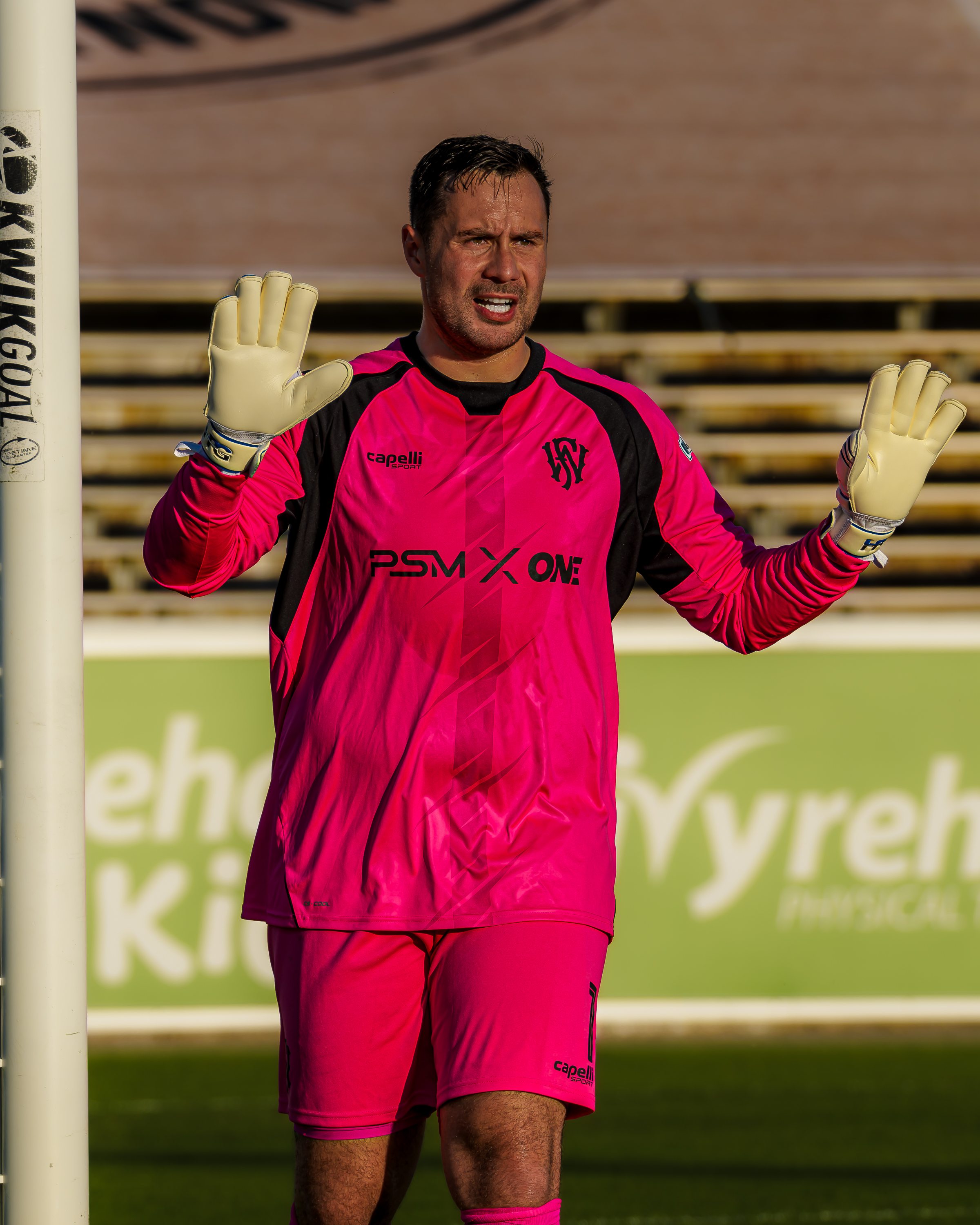
- Schipmann with Fort Wayne in 2026

Personal information
- Full name: Bernd Dizon Schipmann
- Date of birth: 5 July 1994 (age 32)
- Place of birth: Münster, Germany
- Height: 1.94 m (6 ft 4 in)
- Position: Goalkeeper

Team information
- Current team: Fort Wayne FC
- Number: 1

Youth career
- 2008: SC Greven 09
- 2008–2010: Osnabrück
- 2010–2012: Eintracht Frankfurt
- 2012–2013: Schalke 04

Senior career*
Years	Team	Apps	(Gls)
2013–2015	Schalke 04 II	2	(0)
2015–2018	Holstein Kiel II	59	(0)
2018–2021	Rot Weiss Ahlen	61	(0)
2021–2022	Ratchaburi	0	(0)
2023–2025	Forward Madison	73	(0)
2026–	Fort Wayne FC	31	(0)

International career^{‡}
2021–	Philippines	3	(0)
- * Club domestic league appearances and goals as of 12:43, 28 October 2026 (UTC) ‡ National team caps and goals as of 13:20; 27 May 2022 (UTC)

Bernd Dizon Schipmann (born 5 July 1994) is a professional footballer who plays as a goalkeeper for USL League One club Fort Wayne FC. Born in Germany, he represents the Philippines national team.

== Club career ==
=== Youth ===
Schipmann had his youth career at SC Greven 09, Osnabrück, Eintracht Frankfurt and Schalke 04.

=== Schalke II ===
In 2013, Schipmann was promoted to Schalke 04 II, the reserve team of his club.

=== Holstein Kiel ===
In 2015, after his 2-season spell with the reserve team of Schalke 04, Schipmann joined 2. Bundesliga club Holstein Kiel on a free transfer.

Schipmann spent most of his time in Holstein Kiel in the reserve team.

=== Rot Weiss Ahlen ===
In 2018, after the expiry of his contract with his previous club, Schipmann joined Oberliga Westfalen club Rot Weiss Ahlen on a free transfer.

=== Ratchaburi ===
Schipmann signed with Thai League 1 club Ratchaburi F.C. for their 2021–22 season.

=== Forward Madison ===
Prior to their 2023 season, USL League One club Forward Madison announced the signing of Schipmann.

Fort Wayne FC

On January 24, 2026, it was announced Schipmann signed with USL League One Club FWFC for their inaugural USL1 Season.

== International career ==
Schipmann was born and raised in Münster, Germany to a German father and a Filipino mother, making him eligible to represent either Germany or Philippines at international level.

In June 2019, Schipmann initially was called up for the Philippines for a friendly against China. However he did not feature in that match.

In May 2021, Schipmann was once again called up to the Philippines national team ahead of three 2022 FIFA World Cup qualification matches against China PR, Guam, and the Maldives. He made his debut on 7 June against China PR, where he collided with Wu Lei in the box as they both sprinted towards the through ball. Wu went on to score the penalty, and Philippines eventually lost the match 2–0. Four days later, Schipmann kept his first international clean sheet as they won 3–0 against Guam.

== Personal life ==
Schipmann was born to a German father and Filipina mother who is a native of Pagadian, Zamboanga del Sur.

== Honours ==
Holstein Kiel

- Schleswig-Holstein Cup: 2017
