= USS St. Mary's River =

1945 LSM(R)-501-class landing ship medium

History

United States
- Name: USS St. Mary's River (LSM(R)-528)
- Namesake: St. Marys River in Florida and Georgia; St. Marys River in Ohio and Indiana; St. Marys River in Michigan
- Ordered: 1945, as LSM-528
- Builder: Brown Shipbuilding Company
- Laid down: 19 May 1945
- Launched: 16 June 1945
- Commissioned: 2 September 1945
- Decommissioned: March 1946
- Renamed: St. Mary's River, 1 October 1958
- Reclassified: LSM(R)-528, 21 April 1945
- Stricken: 1 October 1958
- Fate: Sold, 4 August 1959; Scrapped, 1989

General characteristics
- Class & type: LSM(R)-501-class landing ship medium
- Displacement: 758 long tons (770 t) light; 993 long tons (1,009 t) attack; 1,175 long tons (1,194 t) full
- Length: 203 ft 3 in (61.95 m)
- Beam: 34 ft 6 in (10.52 m)
- Draft: 5 ft 4 in (1.63 m) light; 6 ft 9 in (2.06 m) attack; 7 ft 9 in (2.36 m) full
- Propulsion: 2 General Motors non-reversing with airflex clutch Cleveland diesels, 1,440 hp (1,074 kW) each at 720 rpm, 2 screws
- Speed: 13 knots (24 km/h; 15 mph)
- Range: 3,000 nmi (5,600 km) at 13 kn (24 km/h; 15 mph)
- Complement: 6 officers, 137 enlisted
- Armament: 1 × 5"/38 caliber gun; 2 × twin 40 mm AA guns; 4 × twin 20 mm AA guns; 4 × 4.2 in (110 mm) mortars; 20 × continuous loading 5 in (130 mm) Ship-to-Shore rocket launchers
- Armor: 10-lb. STS on conning station, pilot-house, radio room, radar plot, and rocket control; 10-lb. ASPP around 40 and 20 mm gun mounts and directors

USS St. Mary's River (LSM(R)-528) was originally authorized as LSM-528. Reclassified LSM(R)-528 on 21 April 1945, she was laid down on 19 May 1945 at the Brown Shipbuilding Co., Inc., Houston, Texas, launched on 16 June 1945, and commissioned on 2 September 1945.

On 6 September, LSM(R)-528 sailed for Galveston, Texas, arriving the next day. She sailed for Charleston, South Carolina, on 12 September. However, after two days at sea, she ran into a storm and was diverted to Naval Frontier Base, Burrwood, Louisiana. After the storm, LSM(R)-528 resumed her voyage and arrived at Charleston on 21 September. While there, the ship had her rocket launchers and mortars installed.

Departing Charleston on 12 October, LSM(R)-528 sailed for Little Creek, VA, arriving on 14 October. After leave and upkeep, she began shakedown training on 15 October. Completing shakedown training on 15 November, she reported a week later to Commander LSM(R) Squadrons, Little Creek. On 29 November, she sailed for Green Cove Springs, FL, with orders to report for inactivation. LSM(R)-528 was decommissioned in March 1946. Named St. Mary's River on 1 October 1958 for the St. Marys River in northeast Indiana, she was struck from the Navy List on the same day. She was sold on 4 August 1959 to Fleet Storage Corp. Her name disappeared from mercantile list in 1989.
