= Chris Apple =

American soccer player and coach

Personal information
- Full name: Christopher Apple
- Date of birth: April 9, 1970 (age 56)
- Place of birth: Millersville, Pennsylvania, United States
- Position: Midfielder

Youth career
- 1989–1992: University of Rochester

Senior career*
Years	Team	Apps	(Gls)
- Raleigh Flyers

Managerial career
- 1993: Harvard College (assistant)
- 1994–1995: North Carolina Wesleyan College
- 1996–1999: University of Notre Dame (assistant)
- 2000: University of Notre Dame
- 2001-2024: University of Rochester
- * Club domestic league appearances and goals

Chris Apple (born April 9, 1970 in Millersville, Pennsylvania, United States) is a former professional soccer player and coach. He attended the University of Rochester from 1988 to 1992, where he played midfield. He led his team to three University Athletic Association Championships, and three NCAA tournament appearances. After graduating, he played professionally for SpVgg Weiden in Germany and later for the Raleigh Flyers.

He started his coaching career as an assistant soccer coach at Harvard College, which he coached in 1993. In 1994, he became the head men's soccer coach at North Carolina Wesleyan College. From 1994 to 1995, he led the team to a 12-20-1 record. From 1996 to 1999, he was an assistant coach at the University of Notre Dame. In 2000, he became the head men's soccer coach at Notre Dame, posting a 7-8-2 record in his only season there. He was replaced by Bobby Clark.

He served as the head men's soccer coach at his alma mater, the University of Rochester, for 23 years until he retired in June 2024. In his 23 seasons at the University, He is the winningest coach in Rochester men's soccer history. He ended his Yellowjacket career with a 258-84-67 record overall, equaling a .713 winning percentage over 22 seasons (no season played in 2020). His résumé comprises 19 total postseason appearances, including 15 trips to the NCAA Division III Tournament and four straight ECAC Northeast Tournament Championship titles.
