= Fort Wayne FC =

Soccer club based in Fort Wayne, Indiana

Fort Wayne
- Full name: Fort Wayne Football Club
- Founded: 2019 (7 years ago)
- Stadium: Ruoff Mortgage Stadium; Fort Wayne, Indiana
- Capacity: 9,280
- Owners: List: DaMarcus Beasley; Mark Music; John Bellio; Drew Little; Tom Lapsley; Michael Khorshid
- Coach: Mike Avery
- League: USL League One
- Website: fortwaynefc.com
Home colors	Away colors

Fort Wayne Football Club, often abbreviated to FWFC, is an American professional soccer club based in Fort Wayne, Indiana, United States, founded in 2019. The club currently competes in USL League One, the third tier of the American soccer pyramid.

This transition to the third tier of American soccer coincided with the opening of the club's new soccer-specific stadium, which will have a seating capacity of 9,280, providing a state-of-the-art venue for fans and players alike. The team's move to USL1 is part of a broader vision to elevate soccer in the region and to establish Fort Wayne FC as a central hub for the sport in the Midwest.

== History ==
Fort Wayne FC was founded by a group of local businesspeople who wanted to provide a stepping stone for young, talented soccer players. In 2019, the club applied to and joined the National Premier Soccer League (NPSL) as an expansion team for the 2020 season. In a public announcement on September 9, 2019, City of Fort Wayne Mayor Tom Henry introduced the club to the city and Fort Wayne FC's president Dr. Erik Magner introduced Greg Mauch as the club's general manager. On December 19, 2019, the club announced Nick Potter and Russ Lawson as the club's assistant coaches.

On January 29, 2020, the club introduced Jeff Richey as the goalkeeper coach. Two weeks later, FWFC announced Mike Avery as the club's head coach.

On March 26, 2020, the NPSL announced the cancellation of the 2020 summer session due to the COVID-19 pandemic.

On October 28, 2020, USL League Two announced its addition of Fort Wayne FC into its league for the 2021 and 2022 seasons. It was also announced that Fort Wayne native and former United States men's national soccer team and Major League Soccer (MLS) player DaMarcus Beasley would be a co-owner of the club.

=== 2021 ===
Fort Wayne FC made its debut on May 9, 2021, losing 3–0 to Oakland County FC. Two weeks later, on May 23, 2021, Fort Wayne FC played its first home match in front of a crowd of over 2,700 fans at Shields Field in a 2–1 to Toledo Villa FC, with forward Noe Garcia scored the club's first goal. The club's first win came on May 23, 2021, in a 1–0 friendly win over Erie Commodores FC. On June 11, 2021, Fort Wayne FC won their first-ever USL League Two win with a 3–1 victory over Toledo Villa FC. In late June, on June 25, 2021, the club hosted its first-ever international-friendly match, welcoming Chivas Guadalajara U19 Reservas to Fort Wayne. Head Coach Mike Avery signed a contract extension for 2022 in August and was appointed as the club's sporting director. Avery worked alongside part-owner DaMarcus Beasley, who played a pivotal role in shaping the future of the club. Finally, on September 22, 2021, the club announced Laurie Perolio-Bullinger would lead Club Operations, while DaMarcus Beasley would continue to guide Football Operations.

=== 2022 ===
In the 2022 season, Fort Wayne FC played 14 games, finishing with 9 wins, 2 ties, and 3 losses. The club demonstrated strong performances throughout the Valley Division, ultimately securing 3rd place but missing out on the playoffs.

=== 2023 ===
With 13 games played, the club finished with 10 wins, 2 ties, and 1 loss, remaining unbeaten in league play and winning the Valley Division Championship. However, they lost in the USL League Two Playoffs Conference Quarterfinals. In a match against the Flint City Bucks, Fort Wayne FC's 19-game unbeaten streak came to an end in overtime, with Lennard Fock's goal in the 116th minute sealing a 3–2 defeat. Despite the loss, goalkeeper Aurie Briscoe's season earned him the USL League Two Golden Glove, a recognition for his performances in goal throughout the campaign.

=== 2024 ===
Fort Wayne FC dominated 2024 season, once again finishing as champions of the Valley Division, securing 8 wins, 3 ties, and 3 losses across 14 games. In the USL League Two Playoffs, they advanced to the Conference Semifinals after a tense 0–0 draw against Midwest United FC in the Quarterfinals. The match was decided by a penalty kick shootout, where Fort Wayne FC won 5–4 to move on. However, their postseason journey came to an end after a 2–1 loss to the Flint City Bucks.

On October 14, Scott Sproat was appointed Chief Operations Officer of Fort Wayne FC, bringing over 23 years of experience with the Fort Wayne Komets, where he served as President of Business Operations. Scott oversees operations in sales, marketing, ticketing, partnerships, promotions, and gameday activities, working alongside DaMarcus Beasley. Sproat also holds an ownership stake in the club.

=== 2025 ===
On February 26, 2025, Fort Wayne FC was announced as an expansion team in USL League One, the third division of the United States soccer league system, scheduled to begin play for the 2026 season; which is the same season that their new privately funded 9,280-seat soccer specific stadium will open. The club made it to the Conference Semifinals for the second consecutive year, losing out to the Flint City Bucks 2–0 in OT.

== Stadium ==
On November 4, 2024, majority team owner Mark Music announced the construction of a soccer-specific stadium, tentatively named Fort Wayne FC Park, to be the home of Fort Wayne FC beginning in 2026. Music retained the architectural services of Fort Wayne firm, Design Collaborative, who released the initial renderings, and also collaborated with developer BND Commercial. On April 2, 2026, Fort Wayne FC announced;. la multiyear naming rights partnership with Ruoff Mortgage, establishing Ruoff Mortgage Stadium as the official name.

The first match was held on May 3, 2026, with limited capacity due to ongoing construction. Fort Wayne FC hosted the Charlotte Independence, ending in a 2–2 draw.

With full seating in place and some final construction remaining, the club held the stadium's grand opening on July 4, 2026; it defeated Spokane Velocity FC 3–0. The club also introduced a mascot, "Friendly the GoalRilla," a black-and-white ape with a gold Mohawk hairstyle to match the team's colors as well as. those of a soccer ball.

Ruoff Mortgage Stadium has a matchday capacity of 9,280 and additional capacity for other events. It is the largest outdoor stadium in Northeast Indiana. It also features a 120'x35' video board, the second largest in the state.

Prior to the 2026 season, Fort Wayne FC competed at University of Saint Francis's Bishop John M. D'Arcy Stadium.

== Colors and badge ==
The original logo of Fort Wayne FC

Fort Wayne FC's original official colors were Dark Blue (2768 U), Blue (279 U), Light Blue (657 U), White, Black, and Red. These colors were used throughout the club's branding and official materials.

Fort Wayne FC's 2021 home kit was white, away kit was blue, and the goalkeeper's kit was red. The three-wave lines on the club's uniform jersey sleeves, shorts and socks represent the three rivers, St. Mary's River, St. Joseph River and Maumee River, of Fort Wayne. Symbols of the flag of Indiana, the flaming torch and its stars, can be found in front of the Fort Wayne FC uniform jersey.

In 2022, Fort Wayne FC signed a multi-year agreement with global sports company, PUMA, as their official apparel partner.

The 2022 PUMA CUP branded home kit featured a bold design that incorporated a wavy design in royal blue, and the away kit featured PUMA's Team Liga 25 red kit.

Ahead of their move to USL League One in 2026, Fort Wayne FC rebranded, adopting autumn gold and black as their primary colors, and designing a new crest.

== Players and staff ==
=== Current roster ===
As of September 27, 2026

Note: Flags indicate national team as defined under FIFA eligibility rules; some limited exceptions apply. Players may hold more than one non-FIFA nationality.

No.	Pos.	Nation	Player
1	GK	PHI	Bernd Schipmann
2	DF	ENG	Jayden Smith
3	DF	SRB	Aleksandar Vuković (on loan from Phoenix Rising)
4	DF	POR	Tiago Dias
5	DF	USA	Reid Sproat
6	MF	USA	JP Jordan
8	MF	ESA	Jeremy Garay
9	FW	ENG	Daniel Oyetunde
10	MF	FRA	Clarence Awoudor
11	MF	USA	Taig Healy
12	MF	USA	Kabiru Gafar
13	DF	USA	Michael Rempel
18	MF	USA	Emerson Nieto

No.	Pos.	Nation	Player
19	DF	COL	Juan Solís
20	MF	USA	Nico Burns
21	MF	USA	Ryan Becher
22	DF	USA	Anthony Hernandez
23	MF	ENG	Jack Thomas
27	GK	USA	Alex Grow
30	FW	USA	Ian Abbey
33	DF	USA	Tyson Hagaman
34	FW	USA	Trace Terry
41	MF	NZL	James Musa
86	MF	ESP	Javier Armas
96	GK	PUR	Aurie Briscoe
99	GK	USA	Taner Akin

=== Coaching staff ===
- (United States) Mike Avery – Head Coach
- (England) Keelan Barker – Assistant Coach
- (England) Max Rose – Goalkeeper Coach

== Record ==
=== Year-by-year ===
Year	Division	League	Regular season (W–L–T)	Playoffs	Open Cup
2021	Great Lakes	USL2	8th (1–7–5)	did not qualify	Ineligible
2022	Valley	USL2	3rd (9–3–2)	did not qualify	Ineligible
2023	Valley	USL2	Champions (10–0–2)	Conference Quarterfinals	did not qualify
2024	Valley	USL2	Champions (8–2–2)	Conference Semifinals	did not qualify
2025	Valley	USL2	Champions (9–2–1)	Conference Semifinals	did not qualify

== Honors ==
- USL League Two – Valley Division Champions: 2023, 2024 & 2025
