= St. Marys River (Indiana and Ohio) =

Saint Marys River
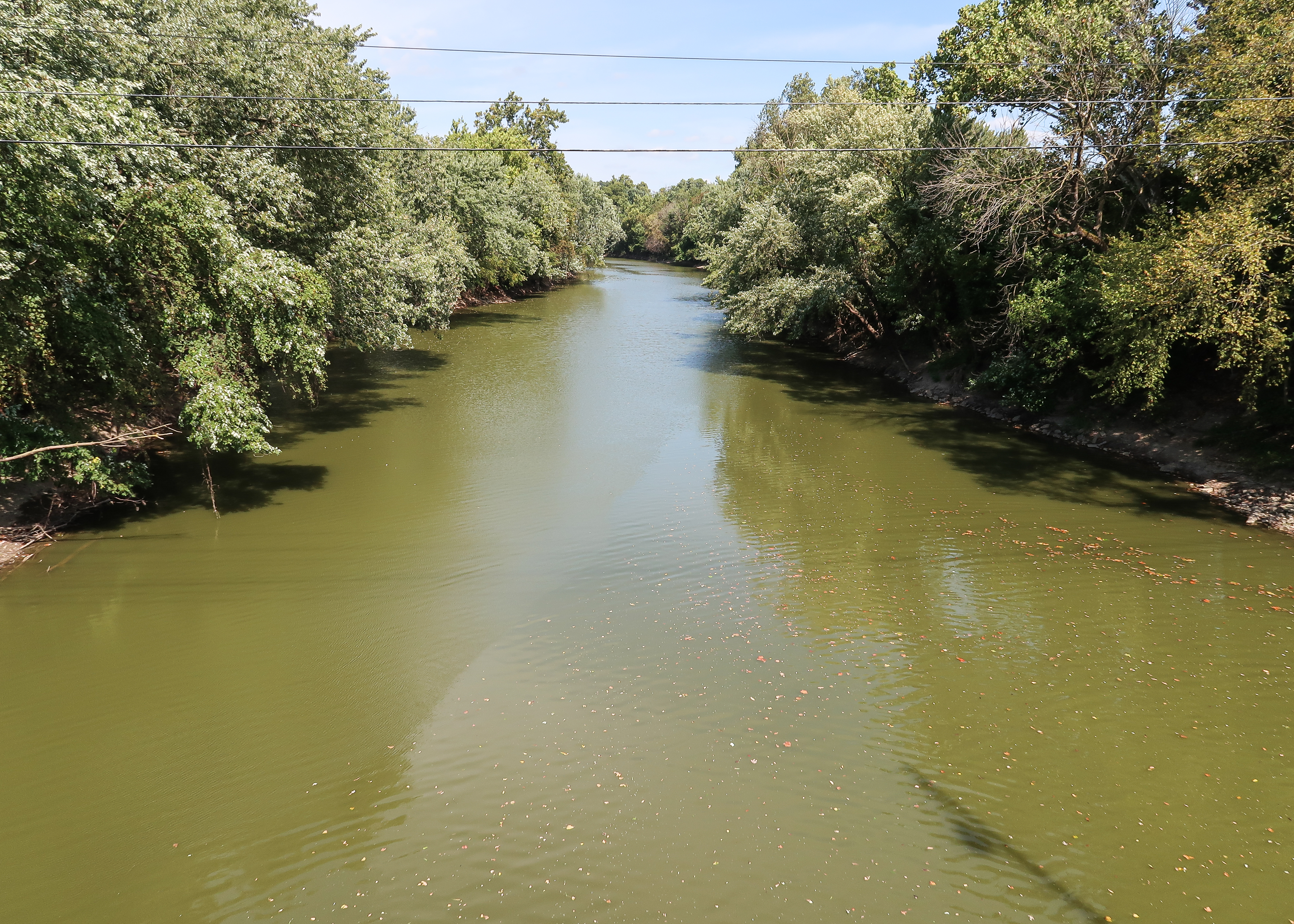
- The St. Marys River in Fort Wayne, Indiana

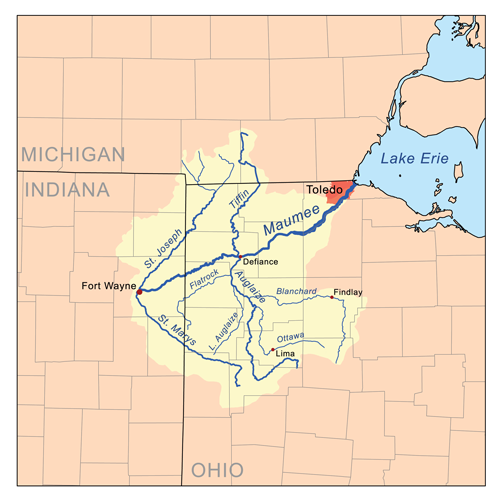
- Map of the Maumee River watershed showing the St. Marys River

Location
- Country: United States
- States: Ohio, Indiana

Physical characteristics
- Source: confluence of East Branch and Center Branch
  - location: near St. Marys, Ohio
  - coordinates: 40°32′14″N 84°21′46″W
  - elevation: 854 ft (260 m)
- Mouth: confluence with the St. Joseph River to form the Maumee River
  - location: Fort Wayne, Indiana
  - coordinates: 41°05′00″N 85°07′56″W
  - elevation: 745 ft (227 m)
- Length: 99 miles (159 km)
- Basin size: 793.1 square miles (2,054 km^{2})

Basin features
- Progression: St. Marys River → Maumee River → Lake Erie → Great Lakes → St Lawrence River → Gulf of St. Lawrence
- GNIS ID: 442706

The St. Marys River (Miami-Illinois: Nameewa Siipiiwi) is a 99-mile-long (159 km) tributary of the Maumee River in northwestern Ohio and northeastern Indiana in the United States. Prior to development, it was part of the Great Black Swamp. Today, it drains a primarily rural farming region in the watershed of Lake Erie.

It is formed in southern Auglaize County in western Ohio by the confluence of the short East Branch and Center Branch. It flows briefly west to St. Marys, approaching to within two miles of Grand Lake before turning to the north. In northwestern Auglaize County it turns sharply to the west-northwest, flowing past Rockford and Willshire into Adams County, Indiana. In northeastern Indiana it flows northwest through Decatur, then enters Fort Wayne. It hooks around in its last half mile (0.8 km) to join the St. Joseph River (in Miami-Illinois: Kociihsasiipi) from the west to form the Maumee in downtown Fort Wayne.

The World War II-era US Navy vessel St. Mary's River was named after this river.

== See also ==
- List of Indiana rivers
- List of rivers of Ohio
