= Jeremy Garay =

Salvadoran footballer (born 2003)

Personal information
- Date of birth: April 1, 2003 (age 23)
- Place of birth: Woodbridge, Virginia, United States
- Height: 5 ft 9 in (1.75 m)
- Positions: Midfielder; defender

Team information
- Current team: Fort Wayne
- Number: 8

Youth career
- 2016–2021: D.C. United

Senior career*
Years	Team	Apps	(Gls)
2019–2023	Loudoun United	79	(0)
2021–2024	D.C. United	2	(0)
2024	→ El Paso Locomotive (loan)	9	(0)
2025	Loudoun United	2	(0)
2026–	Fort Wayne	22	(1)

International career^{‡}
2021	United States U20	1	(0)
2022	El Salvador U20	4	(0)
2021–	El Salvador	2	(0)
- * Club domestic league appearances and goals as of October 27, 2026 ‡ National team caps and goals as of June 26, 2022

Jeremy Garay (born April 1, 2003) is a professional footballer who plays as a midfielder for USL League One club Fort Wayne FC. Born in the United States, he plays for the El Salvador national team.

== Career ==
Garay recorded five games and one assist in his 2019 season. On January 7, 2020, it was announced that Garay would return for Loudoun in 2020.

On July 2, 2021, Garay signed with D.C. United as a homegrown player. United loaned Garay to USL Championship side El Paso Locomotive in March 2024, and subsequently recalled him on June 27, 2024. D.C. United declined his contract option following their 2024 season.

On January 22, 2026, Garay signed with USL League One club Fort Wayne FC for their inaugural USL1 season.

== International career ==
Garay holds dual citizenship in the United States and El Salvador. In August 2021, he was called up by the El Salvador national team for his first international appearance, a friendly match against Costa Rica.

On November 5, 2021, Garay received his first call-up to the United States men's national under-20 soccer team by coach Mikey Varas for the November 7–17 camp and Revelations Cup competition in Mexico. Garay played one match, starting and played 87 minutes against Mexico.

== Career statistics ==
=== Club ===
As of 1 January 2026

Club	Season	League			Cup		Continental		Other		Total	
Club	Season	Division	Apps	Goals	Apps	Goals	Apps	Goals	Apps	Goals	Apps	Goals
Loudoun United	2019	USL Championship	5	0	0	0	–		0	0	5	0
Loudoun United	2020	USL Championship	9	0	0	0	–		0	0	9	0
Loudoun United	2021	USL Championship	27	0	0	0	–		0	0	27	0
Loudoun United	2022	USL Championship	21	1	0	0	–		0	0	21	1
Loudoun United	2023	USL Championship	31	0	3 (Note: Appearance(s) in U.S. Open Cup)	0	–		0	0	31	0
Loudoun United	2025	USL Championship	3	0	0	0	–		0	0	3	0
Loudoun United	Career total		93	1	3	0	0	0	0	0	96	1
D.C. United	2022	Major League Soccer	0	0	1	0	–		0	0	1	0
D.C. United	2024	Major League Soccer	2	0	0	0	–		0	0	2	0
D.C. United	Career total		2	0	1	0	0	0	0	0	3	0
El Paso Locomotive (loan)	2024	USL Championship	9	0	1	0	–		0	0	10	0
Career total			104	1	5	0	0	0	0	0	109	1
