= Ruoff Mortgage Stadium =

Soccer stadium in Fort Wayne, Indiana

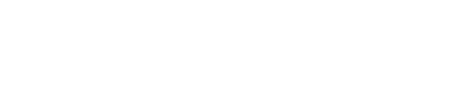

- Taken pre-kickoff September 5th 2026.
- Interactive map of Ruoff Mortgage Stadium
- Full name: Fort Wayne FC Park
- Address: 6411 Bass Rd. Fort Wayne, IN 46818
- Coordinates: 41°05′19″N 85°13′29″W
- Owner: Fort Wayne FC
- Capacity: 9,200
- Type: Soccer-specific stadium
- Surface: AstroTurf LigaTurf
- Acreage: 32 acres
- Current use: Soccer

Construction
- Groundbreaking: April 16, 2025
- Opened: May 2, 2026; 5 months ago
- Architect: Design Collaborative
- Main contractor: BND Commercial

Tenant
- Fort Wayne FC (USL1) (2026–present)

Website
- ruoffstadium.com

Ruoff Mortgage Stadium is a 9,200-seat soccer-specific stadium in Fort Wayne, Indiana. Located immediately west of Interstate 69, it is the home to Fort Wayne FC of USL League One. Opened in 2026, it is currently the largest soccer-specific stadium in Indiana.

== History ==
=== Background ===
A soccer-specific stadium in the city of Fort Wayne was first proposed in May 2020, with a group called Fort Wayne Next, spearheaded by Fort Wayne native DaMarcus Beasley, announcing plans for a new 5,000-7,500 seat soccer-specific stadium north of Downtown Fort Wayne, where he hoped a United Soccer League team would begin play at by 2022. A mixed-use development was planned to coincide with the stadium, which was estimated to cost around $150 million in total. By 2023, the proposal expanded its proposal to a $1.5 billion development with more amenities, and by 2025 the cost had escalated to $3 billion. By mid-March 2025, the previously soccer-specific stadium had been shifted to American football to try and court local Fort Wayne high schools, essentially dropping Fort Wayne FC from consideration.

The land for a potential new development was purchased in 2021 for $2 million. Plans for a new soccer stadium in west Fort Wayne were first construed in early March 2024, when the Allen County Plan Commission received a petition from real estate company BND Commercial that requested that an empty parcel of land in Western Fort Wayne be rezoned from a technology park to a general commercial space. The development was approved in mid-April of the same year, with the planned development envisioning the facility first opening with a 1,500-2,500 seat multi-sport stadium that would be able to expand if the demand demanded it. The stadium plan, which was made separate from the proposed downtown Fort Wayne Next soccer stadium, was proposed to encompass a parcel of land made up of 32 acres (13 ha).

On April 2, 2026, Fort Wayne FC announced a multiyear naming rights partnership with Ruoff Mortgage, establishing Ruoff Mortgage Stadium as the official name.

=== Construction ===
On November 4, 2024, the plans for a new 7,000-seat soccer-specific stadium were made official, with Fort Wayne FC majority owner Mark Music funding development of a brand new soccer specific stadium in Fort Wayne. Fully privately funded, the stadium plans were announced with the expectations that Fort Wayne FC, which previously competed in the pre-professional soccer league USL League Two, would make the jump into professional soccer, which was later confirmed when the announcement in late February 2025 came out that the club would be joining the third division of professional American soccer in the USL League One.

Ground was broken at the stadium site on April 16, 2025. Construction on the stadium was not complete in time for the 2026 Fort Wayne FC season, which caused Fort Wayne FC to play all their matches in March and April on the road. The first event in the stadium's history was a Fort Wayne FC draw against the Charlotte Independence, where the stadium opened at a limited capacity of 4,000 and with large swaths of the stadium still uncompleted.

With full seating in place and some final construction remaining, the club held the stadium's grand opening on July 4, 2026; it defeated Spokane Velocity FC 3–0.
