= Ryan Becher =

American soccer player (born 2001)

Personal information
- Date of birth: April 4, 2001 (age 25)
- Place of birth: Hummelstown, Pennsylvania, United States
- Height: 6 ft 3 in (1.91 m)
- Position: Midfielder

Team information
- Current team: Fort Wayne FC
- Number: 21

Youth career
- –2019: Philadelphia Union

College career
Years	Team	Apps	(Gls)
2019–2022	UMBC Retrievers	61	(25)
2023	UCLA Bruins	14	(5)

Senior career*
Years	Team	Apps	(Gls)
2024–2025	St. Louis City 2	42	(3)
2025	→ Union Omaha (loan)	18	(8)
2026–	Fort Wayne FC	27	(9)
- * Club domestic league appearances and goals as of October 28, 2026

Ryan Becher (born April 4, 2001) is a professional footballer as a midfielder. He currently plays for Fort Wayne FC in USL League One.
