= Javier Armas =

Spanish footballer (born 2000)

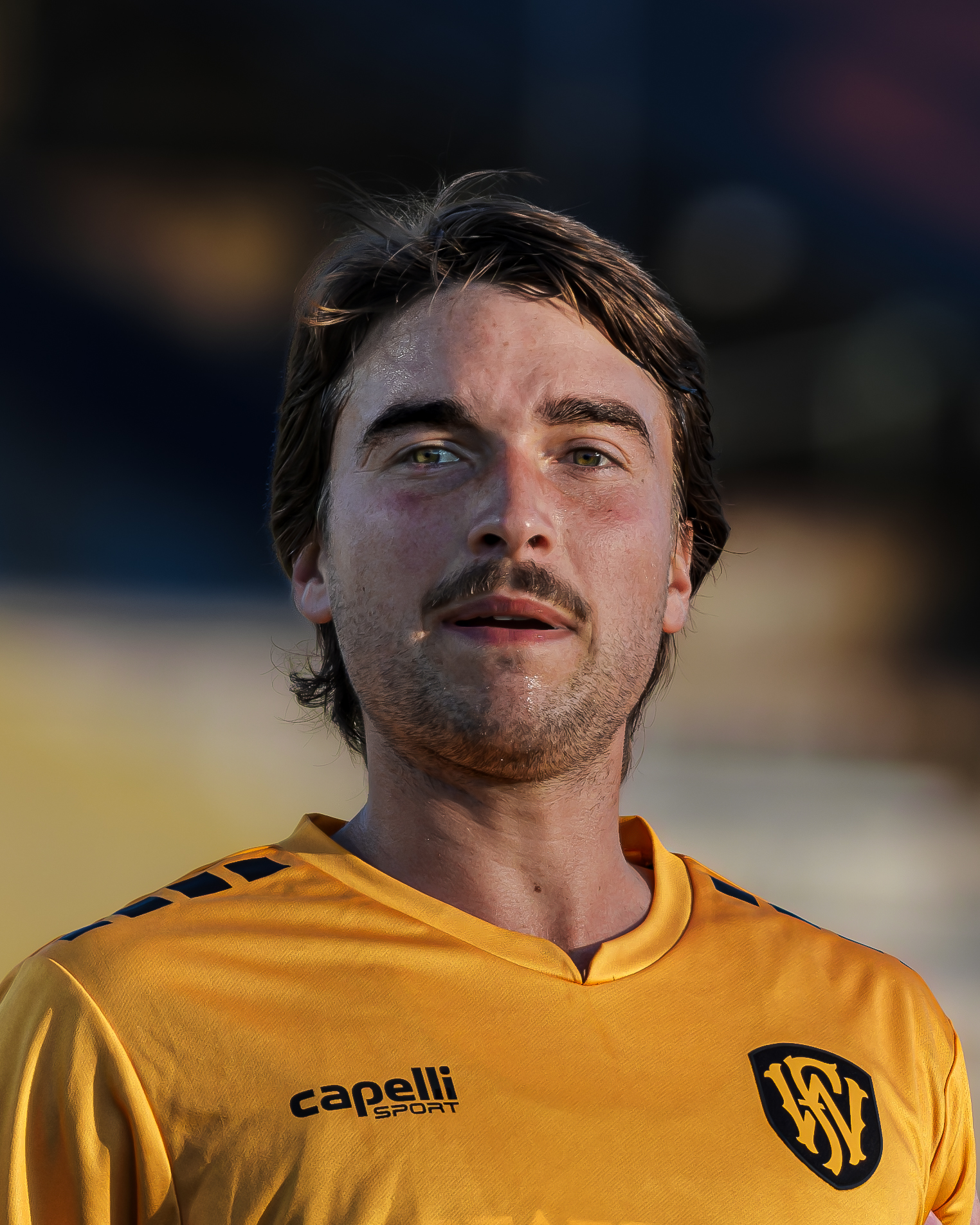
- Armas with Fort Wayne FC in 2026

Personal information
- Full name: Javier Armas Pastor
- Date of birth: 13 January 2000 (age 26)
- Place of birth: A Coruña, Spain
- Height: 5 ft 11 in (1.80 m)
- Position: Midfielder

Team information
- Current team: Fort Wayne FC
- Number: 86

Youth career
- Deportivo La Coruña

College career
Years	Team	Apps	(Gls)
2018–2023	Oregon State Beavers	77	(6)

Senior career*
Years	Team	Apps	(Gls)
2021–2022	CD Vallesco		
2024–2025	Atlanta United 2	53	(10)
2026–	Fort Wayne FC	25	(1)
- * Club domestic league appearances and goals as of 28 October 2026

Javier Armas Pastor (born 13 January 2000) is a Spanish professional footballer who plays for Fort Wayne FC in USL League One.

== Early life ==
Armas played youth football in the Deportivo La Coruña youth system. He also played for the Galcia U15 regional team.

== College career ==
In 2019, he moved to the United States to attend Oregon State University on a scholarship to play for the men's soccer to continue playing while also pursuing an education. On October 13, 2019, he recorded his first collegiate assist in a match against the Washington Huskies. He scored his first goal on February 27, 2021 against the UCLA Bruins. After his junior season, he was named to the Pac-12 Academic Honor Roll. On September 20, 2022, he scored a brace in a 2-1 victory over the Denver Pioneers, subsequently earning Pac-12 Player of the Week honors. At the end of the 2022 season, he was named to the All-Pac 12 Second Team, the All-Far West Region Third Team, and the Pac-12 Academic Honor Roll. Ahead of the 2023 season, he was named to the Pac-12 Preseason All-Conference team. He helped Oregon State reach the national semi-finals in 2023, but was unable to play in the semi-final due to being suspended for having played as an ineligible player in an earlier match he should have missed due to an accumulation of yellow cards. At the end of the season, he was named to the All-Pac 12 First Team, the All-Region team, and the All-America Third Team.

== Club career ==
During 2021 and 2022, he played with CD Vallesco in the Spanish sixth tier Interinsular Preferente de Las Palmas.

At the 2024 MLS SuperDraft, Armas was selected in the second round (48th overall) by Atlanta United FC. In January 2024, he signed a professional contract with the second team, Atlanta United 2 in MLS Next Pro. On March 16, in the season opener, he scored his first goal of the season via a penalty kick.

On January 16, 2026 Fort Wayne FC announced it had signed Armas for its inaugural USL League One season.

== Honors ==
- NCAA Third-Team All-American: 2023
