= 2024 USL Cup =

1st edition of cup competition in American soccer

USL Jägermeister Cup

Tournament details
- Country: United States
- Dates: April 27, 2024 – September 28, 2024
- Teams: 12

Final positions
- Champions: Northern Colorado Hailstorm FC (1st title)
- Runners-up: Forward Madison FC
- Semifinalists: Charlotte Independence; Union Omaha

Tournament statistics
- Matches played: 51
- Goals scored: 140 (2.75 per match)
- Attendance: 115,804 (2,271 per match)
- Top goal scorer(s): (Cuba) Bruno Rendón (9 goals)

The 2024 USL Cup was the first edition of the USL Cup (known as the USL Jägermeister Cup for sponsorship reasons). The competition was open to all clubs in USL League One.

== Format ==
The 2024 edition of the USL Cup was a professional soccer tournament held between teams in USL League One. Richmond Kickers chairman Rob Ukrop stated after the announcement of the USL Cup that another league had been invited to participate, but declined the opportunity.

=== Schedule ===
The 2024 USL Cup ran concurrently with the 2024 USL League One season. The tournament began roughly two months into the league season and ended one month before the end of the league season and start of the league playoffs.

The schedule for 2024 USL Cup group stage games was announced simultaneously with the USL League One league schedule on December 14, 2023.

=== Prize money ===
The announcement of the USL Cup stated that the winning club would receive prize money, but did not specify the amount. In a November 2024 court case, Northern Colorado Hailstorm FC ownership claimed that the winners of the competition would receive $100,000 and the runners-up would receive $25,000, but that USL did not pay Northern Colorado the winners' prize money.

== Access ==
All 12 clubs in USL League One entered the season's USL Cup into the group stage.

Round	Entrants	Number of games	Date(s)
Group stage (12 clubs)	12 clubs from USL League One	48	April 27, 2024 – September 1, 2024
Semifinals (4 clubs)	3 group stage winners 1 wild card winner	2	September 11, 2024
Final (2 clubs)	2 winners from semifinals	1	September 28, 2024

=== Location map ===
Locations of teams in the 2024 USL Cup
- West Group
- Central Group
- East Group

== Group stage ==
The group stage was played from April 27 to September 1. Teams were divided into three regional groups of four teams: the West Group, the Central Group, and the East Group. Teams in each group played each other twice, once at home and once away. Each team also played two teams from other groups; one team at home and the other away.

If a team won in regulation, they received three points in the standings, while the loser received zero. If the game was tied at the end of regulation, a penalty kick shootout occurred; the winner received two points and the loser received one.

The top team in each group reached the knockout stage. Of the other nine teams, the team that scored the most goals also reached the knockout stage.

=== Tiebreakers ===
The ranking of teams in the group stage is determined as follows:

1. Points obtained in all matches (three points for a win, two for a penalty shootout win, one for a penalty shootout loss, none for a defeat);
2. Points obtained in the matches played between the teams in question;
3. Total regulation wins in group play;
4. Total regulation wins in all matches;
5. Number of goals scored in group play;
6. Number of goals scored in all matches;
7. Number of assists in all matches;
8. Goal difference in all matches;
9. Fewest number of disciplinary points;
10. Coin toss.

=== West Group ===
Pos	Team	Pld	W	PKW	PKL	L	GF	GA	GD	Pts	Qualification
1	Northern Colorado Hailstorm FC	8	6	1	1	0	22	10	+12	21	Advanced to knockout stage
2	Union Omaha	8	3	2	1	2	16	13	+3	14	Advanced to knockout stage (wild card)
3	Central Valley Fuego FC	8	1	1	3	3	8	10	−2	8	
4	Spokane Velocity FC	8	1	0	2	5	9	17	−8	5	

Source: USL League One

==== Results table ====
Color key: Home • Away • Win • Shootout win • Shootout loss • Loss
Club	Matches							
Club	1	2	3	4	5	6	7	8
Central Valley Fuego FC (CV)	SPK	LEX	OMA	NCO	TRM	SPK	OMA	NCO
Central Valley Fuego FC (CV)	1–1 (4–2)	2–2 (1–4)	0–0 (1–4)	3–4	1–1 (4–5)	1–0	0–1	0–1
Northern Colorado Hailstorm FC (NCO)	OMA	KNX	CLT	CV	SPK	OMA	SPK	CV
Northern Colorado Hailstorm FC (NCO)	2–2 (2–3)	5–1	2–2 (4–2)	4–3	3–1	2–0	3–1	1–0
Spokane Velocity FC (SPK)	CV	OMA	GVL	OMA	NCO	CV	NCO	RIC
Spokane Velocity FC (SPK)	1–1 (2–4)	3–2	0–0 (4–5)	1–4	1–3	0–1	1–3	2–3
Union Omaha (OMA)	NCO	SPK	CV	SPK	CHA	NCO	CV	MAD
Union Omaha (OMA)	2–2 (3–2)	2–3	0–0 (4–1)	4–1	4–2	0–2	1–0	3–3 (4–5)

=== Central Group ===
Pos	Team	Pld	W	PKW	PKL	L	GF	GA	GD	Pts	Qualification
1	Forward Madison FC	8	5	1	0	2	10	8	+2	17	Advanced to knockout stage
2	One Knoxville SC	8	4	1	1	2	8	7	+1	15	
3	Lexington SC	8	3	2	1	2	10	10	0	14	
4	Chattanooga Red Wolves SC	8	1	1	1	5	10	15	−5	6	

Source: USL League One

==== Results table ====
Color key: Home • Away • Win • Shootout win • Shootout loss • Loss
Club	Matches							
Club	1	2	3	4	5	6	7	8
Chattanooga Red Wolves SC (CHA)	KNX	RIC	LEX	MAD	OMA	KNX	MAD	LEX
Chattanooga Red Wolves SC (CHA)	0–1	1–0	3–4	0–1	2–4	1–1 (3–4)	1–2	2–2 (10–9)
Forward Madison FC (MAD)	LEX	CLT	KNX	CHT	KNX	LEX	CHT	OMA
Forward Madison FC (MAD)	0–1	2–1	1–0	1–0	0–2	1–0	2–1	3–3 (5–4)
Lexington SC (LEX)	MAD	CV	CHA	KNX	GVL	MAD	KNX	CHA
Lexington SC (LEX)	1–0	2–2 (4–1)	4–3	0–2	1–0	0–1	0–0 (5–3)	2–2 (9–10)
One Knoxville SC (KNX)	CHA	NCO	MAD	LEX	MAD	CHA	LEX	TRM
One Knoxville SC (KNX)	1–0	1–5	0–1	2–0	2–0	1–1 (4–3)	0–0 (3–5)	1–0

=== East Group ===
Pos	Team	Pld	W	PKW	PKL	L	GF	GA	GD	Pts	Qualification
1	Charlotte Independence	8	3	1	3	1	11	9	+2	14	Advanced to knockout stage
2	Greenville Triumph SC	8	3	1	1	3	10	8	+2	12	
3	Richmond Kickers	8	2	3	0	3	9	11	−2	12	
4	South Georgia Tormenta FC	8	0	2	2	4	8	13	−5	6	

Source: USL League One

==== Results table ====
Color key: Home • Away • Win • Shootout win • Shootout loss • Loss
Club	Matches							
Club	1	2	3	4	5	6	7	8
Charlotte Independence (CLT)	TRM	MAD	NCO	RIC	RIC	TRM	GVL	GVL
Charlotte Independence (CLT)	1–1 (5–4)	1–2	2–2 (2–4)	1–0	2–2 (4–5)	1–1 (2–3)	2–1	1–0
Greenville Triumph SC (GVL)	RIC	TRM	SPK	TRM	LEX	RIC	CLT	CLT
Greenville Triumph SC (GVL)	1–1 (3–5)	3–2	0–0 (5–4)	3–1	0–1	2–0	1–2	0–1
Richmond Kickers (RIC)	GVL	CHA	TRM	CLT	CLT	GVL	TRM	SPK
Richmond Kickers (RIC)	1–1 (5–3)	0–1	2–1	0–1	2–2 (5–4)	0–2	1–1 (6–5)	3–2
South Georgia Tormenta FC (TRM)	CLT	GVL	RIC	GVL	CV	CLT	RIC	KNX
South Georgia Tormenta FC (TRM)	1–1 (4–5)	2–3	1–2	1–3	1–1 (5–4)	1–1 (3–2)	1–1 (5–6)	0–1

=== Wild card ===
==== Tiebreakers ====
The ranking of teams for the knockout stage wild card is determined as follows:

1. Number of goals scored in all matches;
2. Points obtained in the matches played between the teams in question, if the teams are in the same group;
3. Total regulation wins in group play, if the teams are in the same group;
4. Total regulation wins in all matches;
5. Number of goals scored in group play, if the teams are in the same group;
6. Number of assists in all matches;
7. Goal difference in all matches;
8. Fewest number of disciplinary points;
9. Coin toss.

==== Ranking of non-group leading teams ====
Pos	Grp	Team	Pld	W	PKW	PKL	L	GF	GA	GD	Pts	Qualification
1	West	Union Omaha	8	3	2	1	2	16	13	+3	14	Advanced to knockout stage
2	Central	Lexington SC	8	3	2	1	2	10	10	0	14	
3	East	Greenville Triumph SC	8	3	1	1	3	10	8	+2	12	
4	Central	Chattanooga Red Wolves SC	8	1	1	1	5	10	15	−5	6	
5	East	Richmond Kickers	8	2	3	0	3	9	11	−2	12	
6	West	Spokane Velocity FC	8	1	0	2	5	9	17	−8	5	
7	Central	One Knoxville SC	8	4	1	1	2	8	7	+1	15	
8	West	Central Valley Fuego FC	8	1	1	3	3	8	10	−2	8	
9	East	South Georgia Tormenta FC	8	0	2	2	4	8	13	−5	6	

Source: USL League One

== Knockout stage ==
The winner of each group, as well as the team who scored the most goals in the competition that did not win their group, progressed to the knockout stage.

Semifinals; September 11
W1	Northern Colorado Hailstorm FC	2
WC	Union Omaha	0
C1	Forward Madison FC	2
E1	Charlotte Independence	1

Final; September 28
W1	Northern Colorado Hailstorm FC	1(5)
C1	Forward Madison FC	1(4)

=== Semifinals ===
September 11, 2024
6:00 PM CDT

Forward Madison FC	2−1	Charlotte Independence
Osmond 34'; Chaney 47'	Report	Álvarez 45+2'

Breese Stevens Field, Madison, Wisconsin
Attendance: 1,483
Referee: Joshua Encarnación

September 11, 2024
7:56 PM MDT

Northern Colorado Hailstorm FC	2–0	Union Omaha
Hoard 56'; Rendón 72'	Report

4Rivers Equipment Stadium, Windsor, Colorado
Attendance: 1,657
Referee: Ekaterina Koroleva

=== Final ===
September 28, 2024
7:00 PM MDT

Northern Colorado Hailstorm FC	1−1	Forward Madison FC
Rendón 12'	Report	Chaney 9'
Penalties
Langlois (penalty scored); Hernández (penalty scored); Powder (penalty scored); García (penalty scored); Hoard (penalty scored)	5−4	(penalty scored) Boyce; (penalty scored) McLaughlin; (penalty scored) Mesias; (penalty missed) Crull; (penalty scored) Chaney

4Rivers Equipment Stadium, Windsor, Colorado
Attendance: 3,550
Referee: Greg Dopka

== Statistics ==
All statistics include both the group stage and knockout stage.

=== Top goalscorers ===
Goals scored in penalty shoot-outs are not counted towards players' goal counts or to match goal counts.

Team eliminated for this round.

Rank	Player	Team	Goals	By round									
Rank	Player	Team	Goals	M1	M2	M3	M4	M5	M6	M7	M8	SF	F
1	(Cuba) Bruno Rendón	Northern Colorado Hailstorm FC	9	1	2	1	1	1		1		1	1
2	(United States) Ethan Hoard	Northern Colorado Hailstorm FC	6	1	1		1	1		1		1	
3	(Cape Verde) Steevan Dos Santos	Union Omaha	5				1	2		1	1		
4	(Honduras) Luis Álvarez	Charlotte Independence	4			1			1	1		1	
4	(United States) Christian Chaney	Forward Madison FC	4		1						1	1	1
4	(Brazil) Pedro Dolabella	Union Omaha	4		1		1	1			1		
4	(United States) Luis Gil	Spokane Velocity FC	4		1		1	1		1			
4	(Switzerland) Lyam MacKinnon	Greenville Triumph SC	4		1		2			1			
4	(United States) Missael Rodríguez	Union Omaha	4	2	1		1						
10	(Senegal) Ates Diouf	Lexington SC	3		1	1		1					
10	(England) Cameron Lancaster	Lexington SC	3		1	1					1		
10	(Honduras) Juan Carlos Obregón	Charlotte Independence	3	1	1		1						

=== Most clean sheets ===
Goals allowed in penalty shoot-outs are not counted towards players' clean sheet totals.

Team eliminated for this round.

Rank	Player	Team	Shutouts	By stage	
Rank	Player	Team	Shutouts	GS	KS
1	(United States) Johan Garibay	One Knoxville SC	4	4	
2	(Jamaica) Amal Knight	Lexington SC	3	3	
2	(Philippines) Bernd Schipmann	Forward Madison FC	3	3	0
4	(Mexico) Carlos Avilez	Central Valley Fuego FC	2	2	
4	(United States) Edward Delgado	Northern Colorado Hailstorm FC	2	1	1
4	(United States) Wallis Lapsley	Union Omaha	2	2	0
4	(United States) Austin Pack	Charlotte Independence	2	2	0

== Awards ==
=== Player of the Round ===
Round	Position	Player	Club	Reason	Ref.
1	FW	(United States) Missael Rodríguez	Union Omaha	2 goals vs. Northern Colorado Hailstorm FC	
2	MF	(Cuba) Bruno Rendón	Northern Colorado Hailstorm FC	2 goals, 1 assist vs. One Knoxville SC	
3	FW	(Malawi) Mayele Malango	Chattanooga Red Wolves SC	2 goals, 1 assist vs. Lexington SC	
4	FW	(Switzerland) Lyam MacKinnon	Greenville Triumph SC	2 goals vs. South Georgia Tormenta FC	
5	FW	(Spain) Nil Vinyals	Richmond Kickers	2 goals vs. Charlotte Independence	
6	FW	(Grenada) Shavon John-Brown	Central Valley Fuego FC	Game-winning goal vs. Spokane Velocity FC	
7	FW	(Cape Verde) Steevan Dos Santos	Union Omaha	Game-winning goal vs. Central Valley Fuego FC	
8	FW	(England) Chandler O'Dwyer	Richmond Kickers	2 goals vs. Spokane Velocity FC	

=== Goal of the Round ===
Round	Player	Club	Opponent	Ref.
1	(United States) Pierre Reedy	Spokane Velocity FC	Central Valley Fuego FC	
2	(Japan) Haruki Yamazaki	Northern Colorado Hailstorm FC	One Knoxville SC	
3	(Germany) Adrian Billhardt	Richmond Kickers	South Georgia Tormenta FC	
4	(Colombia) Juan Galindrez	Forward Madison FC	Chattanooga Red Wolves SC	
5	(Spain) Nil Vinyals	Richmond Kickers	Charlotte Independence	
6	(Italy) Pascal Corvino	Greenville Triumph SC	Richmond Kickers	
7	(United States) Devin Boyce	Forward Madison FC	Chattanooga Red Wolves SC	
8	(Cape Verde) Steevan Dos Santos	Union Omaha	Forward Madison FC	

=== Save of the Round ===
Round	Player	Club	Opponent	Ref.
1	(United States) Wallis Lapsley	Union Omaha	Northern Colorado Hailstorm FC	
2	(United States) Ryan Shellow	Richmond Kickers	Chattanooga Red Wolves SC	
3	(Mexico) Carlos Merancio	Spokane Velocity FC	Greenville Triumph SC	
4	(United States) TJ Bush	Chattanooga Red Wolves SC	Forward Madison FC	
5	(United States) Lalo Delgado	Northern Colorado Hailstorm FC	Spokane Velocity FC	
6	(Jamaica) Amal Knight	Lexington SC	Forward Madison FC	
7	(United States) Wallis Lapsley	Union Omaha	Central Valley Fuego FC	
8	(Philippines) Bernd Schipmann	Forward Madison FC	Union Omaha	

=== Team of the Round ===
Player of the Round denoted in Bold.

Round	Goalkeeper	Defenders	Midfielders	Forwards	Bench	Coach	Ref.
1	(Jamaica) Knight (LEX)	(Cuba) Corrales (LEX) (United States) Fox (LEX) (England) Skelton (KNX)	(South Sudan) Jiba (OMA) (United States) C. Johnson (KNX) (United States) Lee (GVL) (Cuba) Rendón (NCO)	(United States) Hoard (NCO) (Honduras) Obregón (CLT) (United States) **Rodríguez** (OMA)	(Honduras) Álvarez (CLT) (United States) Coronado (CV) (Brazil) Fonseca (TRM) (Grenada) John-Brown (CV) (United States) Lapsley (OMA) (United States) Longmire (SPK) (Italy) Mastrantonio (OMA)	(England) Powell (LEX)	
2	(United States) Bush (CHA)	(Madagascar) Métanire (SPK) (Honduras) Midence (CV) (England) Smith (GVL) (Japan) Yamazaki (NCO)	(Jamaica) Lewis (SPK) (Switzerland) MacKinnon (GVL) (United States) Martinez (NCO) (Cuba) **Rendón** (NCO)	(United States) Chaney (MAD) (United States) Rodríguez (OMA)	(United States) Delgado (NCO) (United States) Dengler (TRM) (Brazil) Dolabella (OMA) (United States) Fitch (RIC) (United States) Hoard (NCO) (Honduras) Obregón (CLT) (United States) Waldeck (SPK)	(Libya) Zayed (NCO)	
3	(Mexico) Merancio (SPK)	(Grenada) John-Brown (CV) (United States) Longmire (SPK) (United States) Polak (GVL)	(Honduras) Álvarez (CLT) (Senegal) Diouf (LEX) (United States) Langlois (NCO) (Cuba) Rendón (NCO)	(Germany) Billhardt (RIC) (Malawi) **Malango** (CHA) (France) Obertan (CLT)	(Peru) Fernandez (SPK) (England) Lancaster (LEX) (United States) Martinez (NCO) (Uganda) Onen (LEX) (United States) Rankenburg (GVL) (England) Smith (GVL) (Spain) Vinyals (RIC)	(Libya) Zayed (NCO)	
4	(United States) Pack (CLT)	(United States) Crisler (KNX) (Nigeria) Opara (NCO) (Democratic Republic of the Congo) Sousa (MAD)	(United States) Coronado (CV) (Scotland) King (NCO) (Brazil) PC (OMA) (Cuba) Rendón (NCO)	(Cape Verde) Dos Santos (OMA) (United States) Hoard (NCO) (Switzerland) **MacKinnon** (GVL)	(Honduras) Álvarez (CLT) (Colombia) Castro (GVL) (Germany) Dietrich (NCO) (United States) Garibay (KNX) (Mexico) Mendiola (CV) (United States) Rodríguez (OMA) (United States) Sorenson (CLT)	(Bermuda) Wright (GVL)	
5	(Jamaica) Knight (LEX)	(Grenada) John-Brown (CV) (United States) Malone (OMA) (United States) Ritchie (KNX)	(Liberia) J. Johnson (CLT) (Serbia) Lukic (CHA) (France) Obertan (CLT) (Cuba) Rendón (NCO)	(Cape Verde) Dos Santos (OMA) (United States) Hoard (NCO) (Spain) **Vinyals** (RIC)	(Brazil) Dolabella (OMA) (United States) Gallardo (OMA) (United States) Gil (SPK) (United States) Rodríguez (OMA) (United States) Romig (TRM) (Scotland) Ross (KNX) (Japan) Yamazaki (NCO)	(England) Powell (LEX)	
6	(United States) Bush (CHA)	(United States) Crisler (KNX) (United States) Evans (NCO) (Nigeria) Opara (NCO) (Australia) Osmond (MAD) (Honduras) Álvarez (CLT)	(United States) Anderson (GVL) (United States) Hernández (CHA) (Scotland) King (NCO) (Switzerland) MacKinnon (GVL)	(Grenada) **John-Brown** (CV)	(United States) Anguiano (GVL) (Germany) Billhardt (RIC) (Togo) Dutey (CLT) (Cuba) Méndez (LEX) (United States) Pack (CLT) (United States) Shultz (GVL) (Japan) Yamazaki (NCO)	(Libya) Zayed (NCO)	
7	(United States) Lapsley (OMA)	(United States) Clarke (NCO) (Cuba) Corrales (LEX) (United States) Dengler (TRM)	(United States) Anguiano (GVL) (United States) Boyce (MAD) (Switzerland) MacKinnon (GVL) (Japan) Yamazaki (NCO)	(Cape Verde) **Dos Santos** (OMA) (United States) McLaughlin (MAD) (Honduras) Obregón (CLT)	(Honduras) Álvarez (CLT) (United States) Gil (SPK) (United States) Hoard (NCO) (Jamaica) Knight (LEX) (Cuba) Rendón (NCO) (United States) Spielman (CLT) (Argentina) Terzaghi (RIC)	(United States) Jeffries (CLT)	
8	(United States) Shealy (NCO)	(Spain) García (NCO) (United States) Lue Young (LEX) (United States) Miller (SPK) (England) Skelton (KNX)	(El Salvador) Cerritos (LEX) (Brazil) Gomiero (RIC) (United States) Villalobos (MAD)	(United States) Chaney (MAD) (Cape Verde) Dos Santos (OMA) (England) **O'Dwyer** (RIC)	(United States) Calixtro (KNX) (El Salvador) Corea (CLT) (England) Lancaster (LEX) (Honduras) Obregón (CLT) (United States) Pack (CLT) (United States) Torr (CV) (United States) Waldeck (SPK)	(Libya) Zayed (NCO)	
