= 2024 USL League One season =

USL League One
- Season: 2024
- Dates: March 9 – October 26 (regular season)
- Champions: Union Omaha (2nd Title)
- Players' Shield: Union Omaha (3rd Title)
- Matches: 132
- Goals: 387 (2.93 per match)
- Best player: (Switzerland) Lyam MacKinnon Greenville Triumph SC
- Top goalscorer: (Switzerland) Lyam MacKinnon Greenville Triumph SC (16 goals)
- Best goalkeeper: (United States) Sean Lewis One Knoxville SC
- Biggest home win: 6 goals: LEX 7–1 CV (September 18)
- Biggest away win: 3 goals: CV 0–3 MAD (March 29); SPK 0–3 MAD (May 19); CHA 2–5 OMA (June 5); CHA 2–5 GVL (September 14)
- Highest scoring: 8 goals: LEX 7–1 CV (September 18)
- Longest winning run: 4 matches: OMA
- Longest unbeaten run: 9 matches: MAD
- Longest winless run: 9 matches: CV
- Longest losing run: 6 matches: CV
- Highest attendance: 5,574; RIC 2–1 MAD (July 3)
- Lowest attendance: 397; CV 2–4 CHA (April 13)
- Total attendance: 305,054
- Average attendance: 2,329
- All statistics correct as of October 26, 2024.

The 2024 USL League One season was the sixth season of USL League One, a professional men's soccer league in the third tier of the United States league system.

Twelve teams participated in the 2024 season. Spokane Velocity FC entered as an expansion team. North Carolina FC, having defeated the Charlotte Independence in the 2023 final, left to rejoin the USL Championship. The regular season started on March 9. The 2024 season also included a new in-season tournament, the USL Cup (known as the USL Jägermeister Cup for sponsorship reasons) which featured a group stage and knockout round played between April and September.

== Teams ==
Locations of teams for the 2024 USL League One season

Club	City	Stadium	Capacity	Head coach	Jersey manufacturer	Jersey sponsor
Central Valley Fuego FC	Fresno, California	Fresno State Soccer Stadium	1,000	Jermaine Jones	Capelli Sport	DAISYPRESS.COM
Charlotte Independence	Charlotte, North Carolina	American Legion Memorial Stadium	10,500	Mike Jeffries	Capelli Sport	Novant Health
Chattanooga Red Wolves SC	Chattanooga, Tennessee	CHI Memorial Stadium	5,000	Scott Mackenzie	Adidas	Transcard
Forward Madison FC	Madison, Wisconsin	Breese Stevens Field	5,000	Matt Glaeser	Hummel	Dairyland Insurance
Greenville Triumph SC	Greenville, South Carolina	Paladin Stadium	16,000	Rick Wright	Hummel	Scansource
One Knoxville SC	Knoxville, Tennessee	Regal Stadium	3,000	Ilija Ilić (interim)	Hummel	KUB Fiber
Lexington SC	Georgetown, Kentucky	Toyota Stadium	5,000	Darren Powell	Nike	UK HealthCare
Lexington SC	Lexington, Kentucky	Lexington SC Stadium (Note: Lexington SC began playing at Lexington SC Stadium on September 14, 2024.)	7,500	Darren Powell	Nike	UK HealthCare
Northern Colorado Hailstorm FC	Windsor, Colorado	TicketSmarter Stadium at Future Legends Complex	6,000	Éamon Zayed	Puma	New Belgium Brewing Company
Richmond Kickers	Richmond, Virginia	City Stadium	6,000	Darren Sawatzky	Adidas	Ukrop's
South Georgia Tormenta FC	Statesboro, Georgia	Tormenta Stadium	5,300	Ian Cameron	Puma	Optim Healthcare
Spokane Velocity FC	Spokane, Washington	ONE Spokane Stadium	5,100	Leigh Veidman	Capelli Sport	Local community sponsors (Note: Spokane Velocity FC's jersey features a QR code that links to a page highlighting one of the team's sponsors, which changes monthly.)
Union Omaha	Papillion, Nebraska	Werner Park	9,023	Dominic Casciato	Hummel	Centris Federal Credit Union

=== Managerial changes ===
Team	Outgoing manager	Manner of departure	Date of vacancy	Incoming manager	Date of appointment
Central Valley Fuego FC	(United States) Edison Gonzalez	End of interim period	November 5, 2023	(United States) Jermaine Jones	November 6, 2023
Lexington SC	(Spain) Nacho Novo	End of interim period	October 23, 2023	(England) Darren Powell	November 11, 2023
Greenville Triumph SC	(United States) John Harkes	End of contract	December 31, 2023	(Bermuda) Rick Wright	January 1, 2024
One Knoxville SC	(Scotland) Mark McKeever	Mutual agreement	August 15, 2024	(Serbia) Ilija Ilić (interim)	August 15, 2024

== League table ==
Pos	Team	Pld	W	L	T	GF	GA	GD	Pts	Qualification
1	(Nebraska) Union Omaha (C, S)	22	15	4	3	47	24	+23	48	Playoffs
2	Northern Colorado Hailstorm FC	22	12	5	5	34	18	+16	41	Playoffs
3	(Wisconsin) Forward Madison FC	22	10	3	9	35	18	+17	39	Playoffs
4	(South Carolina) Greenville Triumph SC	22	11	7	4	39	28	+11	37	Playoffs
5	(Tennessee) One Knoxville SC	22	9	5	8	23	16	+7	35	Playoffs
6	(North Carolina) Charlotte Independence	22	9	6	7	37	31	+6	34	Playoffs
7	(Washington (state)) Spokane Velocity FC	22	7	9	6	26	35	−9	27	Playoffs
8	(Virginia) Richmond Kickers	22	6	10	6	25	34	−9	24	Playoffs
9	(Kentucky) Lexington SC	22	5	11	6	33	42	−9	21	
10	(Georgia (U.S. state)) South Georgia Tormenta FC	22	4	10	8	33	42	−9	20	
11	(Tennessee) Chattanooga Red Wolves SC	22	5	14	3	28	48	−20	18	
12	(California) Central Valley Fuego FC	22	5	14	3	27	51	−24	18	

Source: USL League One
Rules for classification: 1) points; 2) total wins; 3) total goal differential; 4) total goals scored; 5) points earned against top four Conference finishers; 6) disciplinary points; 7) drawing of lots.
(C) Champions; (S) Players' Shield winner

== Results table ==
Color key: Home • Away • Win • Loss • Draw
Club	Matches																					
Club	1	2	3	4	5	6	7	8	9	10	11	12	13	14	15	16	17	18	19	20	21	22
CV Fuego FC (CV)	TRM	OMA	MAD	RIC	CHA	CLT	KNX	RIC	NCO	MAD	TRM	CHA	LEX	CLT	SPK	LEX	GVL	NCO	SPK	KNX	GVL	OMA
CV Fuego FC (CV)	2–1	1–2	0–3	2–3	2–4	1–3	0–2	1–1	2–2	1–2	3–2	2–1	1–3	0–4	2–3	1–7	2–2	0–1	1–0	1–2	1–0	1–3
Charlotte Independence (CLT)	KNX	SPK	GVL	OMA	CV	OMA	TRM	CHA	GVL	NCO	CHA	SPK	LEX	MAD	CV	KNX	RIC	TRM	MAD	NCO	LEX	RIC
Charlotte Independence (CLT)	1–2	2–1	1–0	0–0	3–1	1–4	1–1	4–2	0–2	1–0	2–0	4–2	3–3	0–0	4–0	1–1	0–1	3–3	2–4	1–2	2–2	1–0
Chattanooga Red Wolves (CHA)	LEX	CV	NCO	TRM	GVL	OMA	CLT	TRM	SPK	RIC	CLT	OMA	CV	SPK	KNX	MAD	GVL	NCO	KNX	MAD	RIC	LEX
Chattanooga Red Wolves (CHA)	0–1	4–2	1–1	0–4	3–1	2–5	2–4	3–2	1–2	3–1	0–2	1–0	1–2	0–1	1–4	1–3	2–5	0–0	1–1	1–2	1–2	0–3
Forward Madison FC (MAD)	TRM	GVL	CV	RIC	GVL	SPK	LEX	TRM	OMA	RIC	CV	NCO	OMA	CLT	LEX	CHA	SPK	KNX	CLT	CHA	KNX	NCO
Forward Madison FC (MAD)	1–1	0–0	3–0	2–2	3–2	3–0	4–1	0–0	2–0	1–2	2–1	0–1	2–2	0–0	0–0	3–1	2–0	1–1	4–2	2–1	0–0	0–1
Greenville Triumph SC (GVL)	SPK	MAD	LEX	NCO	CLT	TRM	MAD	RIC	CHA	CLT	KNX	OMA	KNX	RIC	NCO	OMA	CHA	CV	LEX	SPK	CV	TRM
Greenville Triumph SC (GVL)	3–1	0–0	3–2	3–1	0–1	3–0	2–3	1–0	1–3	2–0	2–0	0–1	0–0	1–1	0–3	1–3	5–2	2–2	2–1	3–2	0–1	5–1
One Knoxville SC (KNX)	CLT	LEX	TRM	OMA	RIC	CV	RIC	NCO	GVL	TRM	NCO	GVL	CHA	SPK	CLT	LEX	OMA	MAD	CHA	CV	MAD	SPK
One Knoxville SC (KNX)	2–1	2–0	1–0	0–1	1–1	2–0	1–2	1–2	0–2	1–0	1–0	0–0	4–1	1–1	1–1	1–0	0–1	1–1	1–1	2–1	0–0	0–0
Lexington SC (LEX)	NCO	CHA	KNX	GVL	TRM	SPK	MAD	SPK	OMA	TRM	RIC	CLT	CV	MAD	NCO	KNX	CV	RIC	GVL	OMA	CLT	CHA
Lexington SC (LEX)	0–0	1–0	0–2	2–3	0–3	2–2	1–4	1–1	2–4	1–2	2–1	3–3	3–1	0–0	1–5	0–1	7–1	0–3	1–2	1–2	2–2	3–0
NoCo Hailstorm FC (NCO)	LEX	SPK	GVL	CHA	OMA	KNX	RIC	CV	CLT	KNX	MAD	RIC	TRM	GVL	LEX	OMA	CHA	CV	TRM	CLT	SPK	MAD
NoCo Hailstorm FC (NCO)	0–0	0–1	1–3	1–1	2–1	2–1	2–0	2–2	0–1	0–1	1–0	3–1	1–1	3–0	5–1	2–3	0–0	1–0	4–0	2–1	1–0	1–0
Richmond Kickers (RIC)	SPK	TRM	CV	MAD	SPK	KNX	GVL	KNX	CV	NCO	MAD	CHA	LEX	NCO	GVL	OMA	CLT	LEX	OMA	TRM	CHA	CLT
Richmond Kickers (RIC)	1–2	1–3	3–2	2–2	0–2	1–1	0–1	2–1	1–1	0–2	2–1	1–3	1–2	1–3	1–1	0–3	1–0	3–0	0–0	2–2	2–1	0–1
Spokane Velocity FC (SPK)	GVL	RIC	NCO	CLT	LEX	RIC	MAD	LEX	CHA	CLT	TRM	CHA	KNX	OMA	CV	TRM	MAD	OMA	CV	GVL	NCO	KNX
Spokane Velocity FC (SPK)	1–3	2–1	1–0	1–2	2–2	2–0	0–3	1–1	2–1	2–4	3–3	1–0	1–1	2–1	3–2	0–0	0–2	0–4	0–1	2–3	0–1	0–0
Tormenta FC (TRM)	CV	MAD	RIC	KNX	LEX	GVL	OMA	CHA	CLT	MAD	CHA	KNX	LEX	CV	SPK	NCO	SPK	CLT	NCO	RIC	OMA	GVL
Tormenta FC (TRM)	1–2	1–1	3–1	0–1	3–0	0–3	2–4	4–0	1–1	0–0	2–3	0–1	2–1	2–3	3–3	1–1	0–0	3–3	0–4	2–2	2–3	1–5
Union Omaha (OMA)	CV	KNX	CLT	TRM	CLT	NCO	CHA	MAD	LEX	GVL	CHA	MAD	RIC	SPK	GVL	NCO	KNX	SPK	RIC	LEX	TRM	CV
Union Omaha (OMA)	2–1	1–0	0–0	4–2	4–1	1–2	5–2	0–2	4–2	1–0	0–1	2–2	3–0	1–2	3–1	3–2	1–0	4–0	0–0	2–1	3–2	3–1

== Playoffs ==
The 2024 USL League One Playoffs (branded as the 2024 USL League One Playoffs presented by TERMINIX for sponsorship reasons) was the post-season championship of the USL League One season.

=== Bracket ===
Quarterfinals; November 2–3
1	Union Omaha	1
8	Richmond Kickers	0
4	Greenville Triumph SC	2
5	One Knoxville SC	1
2	Northern Colorado Hailstorm FC	0
7	Spokane Velocity FC	3
3	Forward Madison FC	2
6	Charlotte Independence	0

Semifinals; November 9
1	Union Omaha	2
4	Greenville Triumph SC	1
7	Spokane Velocity FC (p)	0 (5)
3	Forward Madison FC	0 (4)

Final; November 17
1	Union Omaha	3
7	Spokane Velocity FC	0

=== Schedule ===
==== Quarterfinals ====
November 2, 2024	Greenville Triumph SC	2–1	One Knoxville SC	Greenville, South Carolina
2:00 PM EDT	Lee 19'; Castro (yellow card) 50'; MacKinnon 80' (pen.); Shultz (yellow card) 90+5'	Report	Tekiela 59' (pen.); Lewis (yellow card) 79'; Zarokostas (yellow card) 85'	Stadium: Paladin Stadium; Attendance: 1,637; Referee: Thomas Snyder

November 2, 2024	Forward Madison FC	2–0	Charlotte Independence	Madison, Wisconsin
6:00 PM CDT	Gebhard 38' (yellow card) 44'; Villalobos (yellow card) 43'; Boyce 90+2' (pen.)	Report	Ciss (yellow card) 19'; Dimick (yellow card) 44'; Sorenson (yellow card) 90+1'	Stadium: Breese Stevens Field; Attendance: 3,953; Referee: Calin Radosav

November 2, 2024	Northern Colorado Hailstorm FC	0–3	Spokane Velocity FC	Windsor, Colorado
7:00 PM MDT	Powder (yellow card) 23'; Kwakwa (yellow card) 77'	Report	Gil 53'; Peláez 64'; Denton 68'	Stadium: 4Rivers Equipment Stadium; Attendance: 1,601; Referee: Gerald Flores

November 3, 2024	Union Omaha	1–0	Richmond Kickers	Papillion, Nebraska
2:30 PM CDT	Mastrantonio (yellow card) 24'; Kunga 51'; Gómez (yellow card) 60'; Schneider (yellow card) 69'	Report	Cela (yellow card) 26'; O'Dwyer (yellow card) 67'	Stadium: Werner Park; Attendance: 2,245; Referee: Jeremy Scheer

==== Semifinals ====
November 9, 2024	Union Omaha	2–1	Greenville Triumph SC	Papillion, Nebraska
4:00 PM CDT	Gómez 42'; Lewis 58'; Gallardo (yellow card) 63'; Schneider (yellow card) 90+2'	Report	Lee 8'; Herrera (yellow card) 31'	Stadium: Werner Park; Attendance: 3,053; Referee: Matthew Corrigan

November 9, 2024	Forward Madison FC	0–0 (4–5 p)	Spokane Velocity FC	Madison, Wisconsin
6:00 PM CDT	Chaney (yellow card) 115'	Report	Dolling (yellow card) 71'; Lage (yellow card) 88'; Jome (yellow card) 90+2'	Stadium: Breese Stevens Field; Attendance: 4,495; Referee: Thomas Snyder
	Penalties
	Boyce (penalty scored); McLaughlin (penalty scored); Dieye (penalty missed); Villalobos (penalty scored); Chaney (penalty scored)		(penalty scored) Dolling; (penalty scored) Peláez; (penalty scored) González; (penalty scored) Lewis; (penalty scored) Fernandez

==== USL League One Final ====
November 17, 2024	Union Omaha	3–0	Spokane Velocity FC	Papillion, Nebraska
2:00 PM CST	Schneider 3'; Dolabella 19'; Kunga 71'	Report	Akale (yellow card) 7'; Miller (yellow card) 45'; Peláez (yellow card) 88'	Stadium: Werner Park; Attendance: 5,849; Referee: Adam Kilpatrick

Championship Game MVP: (United States) Joe Gallardo (OMA)

== Attendance ==
=== Average home attendances ===
Ranked from highest to lowest average attendance.

Team	GP	Total	High	Low	Average
Richmond Kickers	11	51,387	5,574	3,551	4,672
Forward Madison FC	11	46,664	4,856	3,346	4,242
Spokane Velocity FC	11	41,818	5,086	3,108	3,802
Union Omaha	11	38,587	4,509	2,461	3,508
Chattanooga Red Wolves SC	11	24,876	3,447	1,526	2,261
Greenville Triumph SC	11*	19,581	3,734	1,251	1,958
One Knoxville SC	11	18,892	2,345	1,310	1,717
Lexington SC	11	16,799	3,125	1,041	1,527
Northern Colorado Hailstorm FC	11	14,556	2,236	1,063	1,323
South Georgia Tormenta FC	11	12,042	1,407	667	1,095
Charlotte Independence	11	11,842	2,307	530	1,077
Central Valley Fuego FC	11	8,010	1,000	397	728
Total	132	305,054	5,574	397	2,329

|Note= *One match for Greenville Triumph SC was played behind closed doors because of a storm.

== Regular season statistical leaders ==
As of October 26, 2024

=== Top scorers ===
Rank	Player	Club	Goals
1	(Switzerland) Lyam MacKinnon	Greenville Triumph SC	16
2	(Honduras) Juan Carlos Obregón	Charlotte Independence	15
3	(Brazil) Pedro Dolabella	Union Omaha	10
4	(Ghana) Ropapa Mensah	Chattanooga Red Wolves SC	9
4	(Germany) Kempes Tekiela	One Knoxville SC	9
6	(England) Cameron Lancaster	Lexington SC	8
6	(Argentina) Sebastián Vivas	South Georgia Tormenta FC	8
8	(Colombia) Leonardo Castro	Greenville Triumph SC	7
8	(Senegal) Ates Diouf	Lexington SC	7
8	(Brazil) Pedro Fonseca	South Georgia Tormenta FC	7

=== Hat tricks ===
Player	Club	Against	Result	Date
(Ghana) Ropapa Mensah	Chattanooga Red Wolves SC	Central Valley Fuego FC	2–4 (A)	April 13
(Switzerland) Lyam MacKinnon	Greenville Triumph SC	Chattanooga Red Wolves SC	2–5 (A)	September 14
(England) Cameron Lancaster	Lexington SC	Central Valley Fuego FC	7–1 (H)	September 18

Notes

(H) – Home team
(A) – Away team

=== Top assists ===
Rank	Player	Club	Assists
1	(Honduras) Alfredo Midence	Central Valley Fuego FC	8
2	(United States) Derek Gebhard	Forward Madison FC	5
2	(United States) Luis Gil	Spokane Velocity FC	5
2	(Switzerland) Lyam MacKinnon	Greenville Triumph SC	5
2	(France) Gabriel Obertan	Charlotte Independence	5
2	(Spain) Nil Vinyals	Richmond Kickers	5
2	(United States) Ben Zakowski	Greenville Triumph SC	5
8	(Senegal) Ates Diouf	Lexington SC	4
8	(Brazil) Pedro Dolabella	Union Omaha	4
8	(United States) Joe Gallardo	Union Omaha	4
8	(United States) Callum Johnson	One Knoxville SC	4
8	(Liberia) Joel Johnson	Charlotte Independence	4
8	(Serbia) Stefan Lukic	Chattanooga Red Wolves	4
8	(United States) Isidro Martinez	Northern Colorado Hailstorm	4
8	(United States) Wolfgang Prentice	Forward Madison FC	4
8	(Jamaica) Zion Scarlett	Greenville Triumph SC	4

=== Clean sheets ===
Rank	Player	Club	Shutouts
1	(United States) Lalo Delgado	Northern Colorado Hailstorm FC	9
1	(Philippines) Bernd Schipmann	Forward Madison FC	9
3	(United States) Sean Lewis	One Knoxville SC	7
3	(Ghana) Rashid Nuhu	Union Omaha	7
5	(United States) Austin Pack	Charlotte Independence	5
6	(Jamaica) Amal Knight	Lexington SC	4
6	(United States) Ford Parker	South Georgia Tormenta FC	4
8	(United States) Christian Garner	Greenville Triumph SC	3
8	(United States) Gunther Rankenburg	Greenville Triumph SC	3
8	(United States) James Sneddon	Richmond Kickers	3
8	(United States) Brooks Thompson	Spokane Velocity FC	3

== League awards ==
=== Individual awards ===
Award	Winner	Team	Reason	Ref.
Golden Boot	(Switzerland) Lyam MacKinnon	Greenville Triumph SC	16 goals	
Golden Glove	(United States) Sean Lewis	One Knoxville SC	7 shutouts; 0.73 goals against average; 52 saves	
Golden Playmaker	(Honduras) Alfredo Midence	Central Valley Fuego	8 assists	
Goalkeeper of the Year	(United States) Sean Lewis	One Knoxville SC	0.73 goals against average; 7 shutouts; 52 saves	
Defender of the Year	(Cuba) Bruno Rendón	Northern Colorado Hailstorm	169 duels won	
Young Player of the Year	(Honduras) Alfredo Midence	Central Valley Fuego	Led the league with 8 assists	
Coach of the Year	(England) Dominic Casciato	Union Omaha	Back-to-back Players' Shields	
Player of the Year	(Switzerland) Lyam MacKinnon	Greenville Triumph SC	16 goals; 5 assists	
Comeback Player of the Year	(United States) Clay Dimick	Charlotte Independence	Played entire season after back surgery.	

=== All-league teams ===
First team
Goalkeeper	Defenders	Midfielders	Forwards
(United States) Sean Lewis (KNX) (Golden Glove and Goalkeeper of the Year)	(Australia) Mitch Osmond (MAD) (Cuba) Bruno Rendón (NCO) (Defender of the Year) (England) Jordan Skelton (KNX)	(Honduras) Luis Álvarez (CLT) (United States) Devin Boyce (MAD) (Brazil) Pedro Dolabella (OMA) (United States) Luis Gil (SPK)	(United States) Ethan Hoard (NCO) (Switzerland) Lyam MacKinnon (GVL) (Golden Boot and MVP) (Honduras) Juan Carlos Obregón (CLT)

Second team
Goalkeeper	Defenders	Midfielders	Forwards
(United States) Lalo Delgado (NCO)	(United States) Simon Fitch (RIC) (Spain) David García (NCO) (United States) Nick Spielman (CLT)	(Senegal) Ates Diouf (LEX) (United States) Chapa Herrera (GVL) (United States) Evan Lee (GVL) (United States) Jimmie Villalobos (MAD)	(Brazil) Pedro Fonseca (TRM) (Honduras) Alfredo Midence (CV) (Golden Playmaker and Young Player of the Year) (Spain) Nil Vinyals (RIC)

=== Monthly awards ===
Month	Player of the Month			Coach of the Month		References
Month	Player	Club	Position	Coach	Club	References
March	(Honduras) Angelo Kelly-Rosales	One Knoxville SC	Midfielder	(Scotland) Mark McKeever	One Knoxville SC	
April	(Ghana) Ropapa Mensah	Chattanooga Red Wolves SC	Forward	(United States) Mike Jeffries	Charlotte Independence	
May	(Brazil) Pedro Dolabella	Union Omaha	Midfielder	(England) Dominic Casciato	Union Omaha	
June	(Honduras) Juan Carlos Obregón	Charlotte Independence	Forward	(United States) Matt Glaeser	Forward Madison FC	
July	(Honduras) Alfredo Midence	Central Valley Fuego FC	Forward	(United States) Mike Jeffries	Charlotte Independence	
August	(United States) Ethan Hoard	Northern Colorado Hailstorm FC	Forward	(England) Darren Powell	Lexington SC	
September	(Switzerland) Lyam MacKinnon	Greenville Triumph SC	Midfielder	(England) Dominic Casciato	Union Omaha	
October	(United States) Lalo Delgado	Northern Colorado Hailstorm	Goalkeeper	(Libya) Éamon Zayed	Northern Colorado Hailstorm	

=== Weekly awards ===
Player of the Week
Week	Player	Club	Position	Reason	Ref.
1	(Colombia) Leonardo Castro	Greenville Triumph SC	Forward	Goal vs Spokane	
2	(Honduras) Angelo Kelly-Rosales	One Knoxville SC	Forward	2 goals vs Charlotte	
3	(United States) Luis Gil	Spokane Velocity FC	Midfielder	GWG PK vs Northern Colorado	
4	(Honduras) Luis Álvarez	Charlotte Independence	Midfielder	GWG vs Spokane	
5	(Switzerland) Lyam MacKinnon	Greenville Triumph SC	Midfielder	2 goals vs Northern Colorado	
6	(Ghana) Ropapa Mensah	Chattanooga Red Wolves	Forward	Hat trick vs Central Valley Fuego	
7	(Switzerland) Lyam MacKinnon	Greenville Triumph SC	Forward	2 goals vs Tormenta FC	
8	(United States) Joe Gallardo	Union Omaha	Midfielder	1 goal; 2 assists vs Tormenta FC	
9	(Argentina) Sebastián Vivas	South Georgia Tormenta FC	Forward	2 goals; 1 assist vs Chattanooga	
10	(Jamaica) Chevone Marsh	Chattanooga Red Wolves	Forward	3 goals in 2 matches	
11	(Honduras) Juan Carlos Obregón	Charlotte Independence	Forward	2 goals vs Chattanooga	
12	(Switzerland) Lyam MacKinnon	Greenville Triumph SC	Midfielder	2 goals in 2 games	
13	(Cape Verde) Steevan Dos Santos	Union Omaha	Forward	2 goals vs Lexington	
14	(Ghana) Ropapa Mensah	Chattanooga Red Wolves	Forward	2 goals vs Richmond	
15	(Honduras) Alfredo Midence	Central Valley Fuego FC	Forward	3 assists vs Tormenta FC	
16	(Jamaica) Andre Lewis	Spokane Velocity FC	Midfielder	2 goals; 1 assists	
17	(Germany) Kempes Tekiela	One Knoxville SC	Forward	2 goals; 1 assist vs Chattanooga	
18	(United States) Joe Gallardo	Union Omaha	Midfielder	2 goals vs Richmond	
19	(United States) Luis Gil	Spokane Velocity FC	Midfielder	1 goal; 1 assist in 2 games	
20	(Switzerland) Lyam MacKinnon	Greenville Triumph SC	Midfielder	Hat Trick vs Chattanooga	
21	(England) Cameron Lancaster	Lexington SC	Forward	Hat Trick vs Central Valley Fuego	
22	(United States) Lalo Delgado	Northern Colorado Hailstorm	Goalkeeper	2 clean sheets; 15 saves in 2 games	
23	(Switzerland) Lyam MacKinnon	Greenville Triumph SC	Midfielder	2 goals vs Spokane	
24	(England) Jordan Skelton	One Knoxville SC	Defender	12 clearances; 5 blocks in 2 games	
25	(United States) Matt Levy	Charlotte Independence	Goalkeeper	9 saves and a clean sheet in his 1st start	

Goal of the Week
Week	Player	Club	Opponent	Ref.
1	(Colombia) Leonardo Castro	Greenville Triumph SC	Spokane Velocity FC	
2	(Scotland) Frank Ross	One Knoxville SC	Charlotte Independence	
3	(United States) Stuart Ritchie	One Knoxville SC	Lexington SC	
4	(United States) John Murphy	Forward Madison FC	Central Valley Fuego	
5	(United States) Zahir Vasquez	Central Valley Fuego	Richmond Kickers	
6	(Chile) Maxi Schenfeld	Richmond Kickers	Forward Madison FC	
7	(United States) Ethan Hoard	Northern Colorado Hailstorm	Chattanooga Red Wolves	
8	(Germany) Kempes Tekiela	One Knoxville SC	Richmond Kickers	
9	(Argentina) Sebastián Vivas	South Georgia Tormenta FC	Chattanooga Red Wolves	
10	(England) Mason Tunbridge	South Georgia Tormenta FC	Charlotte Independence	
11	(Honduras) Juan Carlos Obregon	Charlotte Independence	Chattanooga Red Wolves	
12	(United States) Ethan Hoard	Northern Colorado Hailstorm	Richmond Kickers	
13	(Trinidad and Tobago) Real Gill	Northern Colorado Hailstorm	Central Valley Fuego	
14	(Argentina) Emiliano Terzaghi	Richmond Kickers	Chattanooga Red Wolves	
15	(United States) Christian Chaney	Forward Madison FC	Central Valley Fuego FC	
16	(England) Cameron Lancaster	Lexington SC	Charlotte Independence	
17	(United States) Ryan Sierakowski	Richmond Kickers	Greenville Triumph SC	
18	(United States) Ethan Hoard	Northern Colorado Hailstorm	Greenville Triumph SC	
19	(United States) Azriel González	Spokane Velocity FC	Central Valley Fuego FC	
20	(United States) Ethan Hoard	Northern Colorado Hailstorm	Union Omaha	
21	(United States) John Murphy	Forward Madison FC	Spokane Velocity FC	
22	(United States) Marky Hernandez	Northern Colorado Hailstorm	Tormenta FC	
23	(England) Aiden Mesias	Forward Madison FC	Chattanooga Red Wolves	
24	(United States) Aaron Walker	Tormenta FC	Union Omaha	
25	(Cuba) Bruno Rendón	Northern Colorado Hailstorm	Forward Madison FC	

Save of the Week
Week	Goalkeeper	Club	Opponent	Ref.
1	(United States) Ford Parker	Tormenta FC	Central Valley Fuego	
2	(United States) Ford Parker	Tormenta FC	Forward Madison FC	
3	(United States) Ford Parker	Tormenta FC	Richmond Kickers	
4	(United States) Ford Parker	Tormenta FC	One Knoxville SC	
5	(United States) Lalo Delgado	Northern Colorado Hailstorm	Greenville Triumph SC	
6	(United States) TJ Bush	Chattanooga Red Wolves	Central Valley Fuego	
7	(United States) Lalo Delgado	Northern Colorado Hailstorm	Chattanooga Red Wolves	
8	(United States) Ryan Shellow	Richmond Kickers	One Knoxville SC	
9	(Ghana) Rashid Nuhu	Union Omaha	Charlotte Independence	
10	(United States) TJ Bush	Chattanooga Red Wolves	Union Omaha	
11	(United States) Lalo Delgado	Northern Colorado Hailstorm	One Knoxville SC	
12	(United States) Gunther Rankenburg	Greenville Triumph SC	One Knoxville SC	
13	(United States) Drew Romig	South Georgia Tormenta FC	One Knoxville SC	
14	(United States) Austin Pack	Charlotte Independence	Chattanooga Red Wolves	
15	(United States) TJ Bush	Chattanooga Red Wolves	Union Omaha	
16	(Mexico) Carlos Avilez	Central Valley Fuego	Chattanooga Red Wolves	
17	(United States) TJ Bush	Chattanooga Red Wolves	One Knoxville SC	
18	(Jamaica) Amal Knight	Lexington SC	Forward Madison FC	
19	(United States) Brooks Thompson	Spokane Velocity FC	Central Valley Fuego	
20	(United States) Lalo Delgado	Northern Colorado Hailstorm	Union Omaha	
21	(United States) Lalo Delgado	Northern Colorado Hailstorm	Chattanooga Red Wolves	
22	(United States) Johan Garibay	One Knoxville SC	Chattanooga Red Wolves	
23	(United States) Ford Parker	Tormenta FC	Richmond Kickers	
24	(United States) Gunther Rankenburg	Greenville Triumph SC	Central Valley Fuego	
25	(United States) Matt Levy	Charlotte Independence	Richmond Kickers	

Team of the Week
Week	Goalkeeper	Defenders	Midfielders	Forwards	Bench	Coach	Ref.
**1**	(Jamaica) Knight (LEX)	(Haiti) Apollon (CV) (Cuba) Corrales (LEX) (Nigeria) Opara (NCO) (United States) Shultz (GVL)	(United States) Espinoza (CV) (United States) Lee (GVL) (Switzerland) MacKinnon (GVL) (Jamaica) Scarlett (GVL)	(Colombia) **L. Castro** (GVL) (England) Dolling (SPK)	(Mexico) Avilez (CV) (England) Denton (SPK) (United States) Reedy (SPK) (Cuba) Rendón (NCO) (El Salvador) Rodriguez (GVL) (United States) Torr (CV) (Malta) Yankam (LEX)	(Bermuda) Rick Wright (GVL)	
**2**	(United States) Parker (TRM)	(United States) Dimick (CLT) (United States) Longmire (SPK) (United States) Malone (OMA) (Madagascar) Métanire (SPK)	(Germany) Billhardt (RIC) (United States) Boyce (MAD) (Grenada) John-Brown (CV) (Malta) Yankam (LEX)	(Honduras) **Kelly-Rosales** (KNX) (Scotland) Ross (KNX)	(England) Denton (SPK) (Cape Verde) Dos Santos (OMA) (United States) Gil (SPK) (Mexico) Gómez (OMA) (United States) C. Johnson (KNX) (Jamaica) Knight (LEX) (Italy) Milanese (OMA)	(England) Leigh Veidman (SPK)	
**3**	(Philippines) Schipmann (MAD)	(Spain) D. Fernandez (KNX) (United States) Lage (SPK) (Madagascar) Métanire (SPK)	(United States) Doyle (TRM) (United States) **Gil** (SPK) (United States) Ritchie (KNX) (United States) Spengler (TRM) (Spain) Vinyals (RIC)	(United States) R. Castro (KNX) (Honduras) Kelly-Rosales (KNX)	(United States) Lee (GVL) (United States) Longmire (SPK) (United States) Martinez (NCO) (United States) Mehl (MAD) (United States) Parker (TRM) (England) Skelton (KNX) (England) Watson (TRM)	(Scotland) Ian Cameron (TRM)	
**4**	(Philippines) Schipmann (MAD)	(Cuba) Corrales (LEX) (United States) Fricke (GVL) (Australia) Osmond (MAD) (United States) Spielman (CLT)	(Honduras) **Álvarez** (CLT) (United States) Boyce (MAD) (Switzerland) MacKinnon (GVL) (United States) Murphy (MAD)	(United States) Gebhard (MAD) (Honduras) Kelly-Rosales (KNX)	(England) Lancaster (LEX) (United States) Mehl (MAD) (United States) Pack (CLT) (United States) Reedy (SPK) (United States) Ritchie (KNX) (England) Smith (GVL) (United States) Zakowski (GVL)	(Bermuda) Rick Wright (GVL)	
**5**	(United States) Parker (TRM)	(United States) Fitch (RIC) (United States) Dengler (TRM) (Nigeria) Opara (NCO) (England) Smith (GVL)	(Germany) Billhardt (RIC) (Brazil) Fonseca (TRM) (Switzerland) **MacKinnon** (GVL) (England) O'Dwyer (RIC)	(Colombia) L. Castro (GVL) (Colombia) Rodríguez (TRM)	(United States) Akoto (TRM) (United States) Garner (GVL) (Lebanon) Khoury (TRM) (United States) Polak (GVL) (Jamaica) Scarlett (GVL) (United States) Vasquez (CV) (Spain) Vinyals (RIC)	(Scotland) Ian Cameron (TRM)	
**6**	(United States) Pack (CLT)	(United States) Longmire (SPK) (United States) Malone (OMA) (United States) Roberts (CLT)	(Germany) Billhardt (RIC) (United States) Boyce (MAD) (England) Denton (SPK) (United States) Gil (SPK)	(Cape Verde) Dos Santos (OMA) (Ghana) **Mensah** (CHA) (United States) Vasquez (CV)	(Brazil) Coutinho (CHA) (United States) Liadi (LEX) (Serbia) Lukic (CHA) (Ghana) Nuhu (OMA) (Honduras) Obregón (CLT) (Chile) Schenfeld (RIC) (Malta) Yankam (LEX)	(United States) Mike Jeffries (CLT)	
**7**	(United States) Pack (CLT)	(Madagascar) Métanire (SPK) (Italy) Milanese (OMA) (Cuba) Rendón (NCO)	(Peru) C. Fernandez (SPK) (Jamaica) A. Lewis (SPK) (Malawi) Malango (CHA) (United States) Reedy (SPK)	(United States) Hoard (NCO) (Switzerland) **MacKinnon** (GVL) (Ghana) Mensah (CHA)	(United States) Anderson (GVL) (Colombia) L. Castro (GVL) (Haiti) Jérôme (OMA) (United States) Martinez (NCO) (Ghana) Nuhu (OMA) (United States) Spielman (CLT) (United States) Zakowski (GVL)	(England) Leigh Veidman (SPK)	
**8**	(United States) Shellow (RIC)	(United States) Acoff (OMA) (United States) Ritchie (KNX) (England) Smith (GVL)	(Brazil) Dolabella (OMA) (United States) Doyle (TRM) (United States) **Gallardo** (OMA) (United States) Prentice (MAD)	(Brazil) Fonseca (TRM) (Honduras) Obregón (CLT) (Switzerland) MacKinnon (GVL)	(Honduras) Álvarez (CLT) (Mexico) Carrera-García (CV) (United States) Coronado (CV) (England) Nortey (OMA) (Ghana) Nuhu (OMA) (United States) Roberts (CLT) (Argentina) Vivas (TRM)	(England) Dominic Casciato (OMA)	
**9**	(Philippines) Schipmann (MAD)	(Argentina) Lombardi (TRM) (United States) Ritchie (KNX) (United States) Shultz (GVL)	(Brazil) Dolabella (OMA) (Honduras) Kelly-Rosales (KNX) (United States) Kunga (OMA) (United States) Spengler (TRM)	(United States) Chaney (MAD) (United States) Rodríguez (OMA) (Argentina) **Vivas** (TRM)	(United States) Akoto (TRM) (Mexico) Gómez (OMA) (Italy) Milanese (OMA) (United States) Parker (TRM) (United States) Prentice (MAD) (Germany) Tekiela (KNX) (United States) Villalobos (MAD)	(United States) Matt Glaeser (MAD)	
**10**	(Chile) Jara (RIC)	(Spain) García (NCO) (United States) Malone (OMA) (England) Smith (GVL) (Republic of Ireland) Watters (CHA)	(Brazil) Dolabella (OMA) (United States) Gebhard (MAD) (England) Mesias (MAD)	(United States) Chaney (MAD) (United States) Gallardo (OMA) (Jamaica) **Marsh** (CHA)	(United States) Balogun (LEX) (Honduras) Obregón (CLT) (Nigeria) Opara (NCO) (Cuba) Rendón (NCO) (Philippines) Schipmann (MAD) (Puerto Rico) Stretch (TRM) (Germany) Tekiela (KNX)	(United States) Matt Glaeser (MAD)	
**11**	(Philippines) Schipmann (MAD)	(Brazil) França (RIC) (Spain) García (NCO) (Australia) Osmond (MAD) (United States) Sorenson (CLT)	(Honduras) Álvarez (CLT) (United States) Langlois (NCO) (Cuba) Rendón (NCO) (Chile) Schenfeld (RIC)	(Malawi) Malango (CHA) (Honduras) **Obregón** (CLT)	(Grenada) Belmar (CLT) (Honduras) Benson (CV) (United States) Delgado (NCO) (United States) Dengler (TRM) (Honduras) Midence (CV) (France) Obertan (CLT) (Germany) Tekiela (KNX)	(United States) Mike Jeffries (CLT)	
**12**	(United States) Rankenburg (GVL)	(United States) Dengler (TRM) (United States) Longmire (SPK) (United States) Wu (GVL)	(Jamaica) Brown (LEX) (United States) Lee (GVL) (Switzerland) **MacKinnon** (GVL) (Cuba) Rendón (NCO) (United States) Zakowski (GVL)	(United States) Hoard (NCO) (Jamaica) Marsh (CHA)	(United States) Akale (SPK) (Colombia) L. Castro (GVL) (Peru) C. Fernandez (SPK) (United States) Gil (SPK) (Italy) Mastrantonio (OMA) (Philippines) Schipmann (MAD) (United States) Waldeck (SPK)	(Bermuda) Rick Wright (GVL)	
**13**	(United States) Thompson (SPK)	(United States) Aune (RIC) (United States) Longmire (SPK) (France) Djedje (CLT)	(Germany) Billhardt (RIC) (United States) C. Johnson (KNX) (Brazil) Dolabella (OMA) (United States) Akale (SPK) (United States) Gil (SPK)	(Cape Verde) **Dos Santos** (OMA) (Germany) Tekiela (KNX)	(Colombia) Galindrez (MAD) (Jamaica) A. Lewis (SPK) (England) O'Dwyer (RIC) (Cuba) Rendón (NCO) (United States) Romig (TRM) (United States) Spielman (CLT) (Spain) Vinyals (RIC)	(United States) Darren Sawatzky (RIC)	
**14**	(United States) Pack (CLT)	(Italy) Mastrantonio (OMA) (England) Skelton (KNX) (Republic of Ireland) Watters (CHA)	(Senegal) Diouf (LEX) (Brazil) Dolabella (OMA) (Brazil) Fonseca (TRM) (United States) Gómez (CHA) (Liberia) J. Johnson (CLT)	(Ghana) **Mensah** (CHA) (Argentina) Terzaghi (RIC)	(France) Djedje (CLT) (United States) Fricke (GVL) (United States) Hernández (CHA) (United States) Lewis (KNX) (Jamaica) Marsh (CHA) (France) Obertan (CLT) (Argentina) Vivas (TRM)	(United States) Mike Jeffries (CLT)	
**15**	(United States) Bush (CHA)	(United States) Mehl (MAD) (Cuba) Rendón (NCO) (United States) Yaya (CV)	(United States) Akale (SPK) (Liberia) J. Johnson (CLT) (Philippines) Mariona (CV) (France) Obertan (CLT)	(Honduras) **Midence** (CV) (Honduras) Obregón (CLT) (Argentina) Vivas (TRM)	(Honduras) Benson (CV) (United States) Boyce (MAD) (Austria) Crull (MAD) (Senegal) Diouf (LEX) (Brazil) Fonseca (TRM) (Scotland) King (NCO) (United States) Lewis (KNX)	(Scotland) Scott Mackenzie (CHA)	
**16**	(Mexico) Avilez (CV)	(Austria) Crull (MAD) (United States) Miller (SPK) (Cuba) Rendón (NCO) (United States) Waldeck (SPK)	(United States) Gil (SPK) (Trinidad and Tobago) Gill (NCO) (Jamaica) **A. Lewis** (SPK) (Honduras) Midence (CV) (United States) Sorenson (CLT)	(England) Dolling (SPK)	(Mexico) Carrera-García (CV) (El Salvador) Cerritos (LEX) (Senegal) Diouf (LEX) (Brazil) Fonseca (TRM) (United States) Hoard (TRM) (United States) Thompson (SPK) (United States) Young (LEX)	(United States) Jermaine Jones (CV)	
**17**	(United States) Pack (CLT)	(Spain) D. Fernández (KNX) (United States) Kilwien (TRM) (United States) Ritchie (KNX) (United States) Sorenson (CLT)	(Mexico) Carrera-García (CV) (El Salvador) Cerritos (LEX) (Senegal) Diouf (LEX) (Colombia) Velásquez (GVL)	(Germany) **Tekiela** (KNX) (Greece) Zarokostas (KNX)	(United States) Fitch (RIC) (Brazil) Fonseca (TRM) (England) Lancaster (LEX) (Philippines) Schipmann (MAD) (England) Skelton (KNX) (England) Smith (GVL) (Malta) Yankam (LEX)	(England) Darren Powell (LEX)	
**18**	(United States) Pack (CLT)	(United States) Dimick (CLT) (United States) Longmire (SPK) (Nigeria) Opara (NCO) (United States) Sorenson (CLT)	(United States) **Gallardo** (OMA) (Trinidad and Tobago) Gill (NCO) (Scotland) King (NCO) (United States) Knapp (OMA)	(United States) Hoard (NCO) (Germany) Tekiela (KNX)	(Germany) Billhardt (RIC) (Senegal) Ciss (CLT) (Jamaica) Knight (LEX) (United States) Martinez (NCO) (Honduras) Obregón (CLT) (England) Skelton (KNX) (United States) Waldeck (SPK)	(United States) Mike Jeffries (CLT)	
**19**	(United States) Pack (CLT)	(United States) Lage (SPK) (United States) Miller (SPK) (Nigeria) Opara (NCO)	(Brazil) Dolabella (OMA) (Scotland) King (NCO) (Jamaica) A. Lewis (SPK) (United States) **Gil** (SPK) (Cuba) Rendón (NCO)	(Cape Verde) Dos Santos (OMA) (France) Obertan (CLT)	(Spain) Fernandez (KNX) (United States) Garner (GVL) (United States) Hoard (NCO) (Switzerland) MacKinnon (GVL) (United States) Prentice (MAD) (United States) Villalobos (MAD) (United States) Waldeck (SPK)	(England) Leigh Veidman (SPK)	
**20**	(United States) Sneddon (RIC)	(United States) Garnett (RIC) (England) Skelton (KNX) (Japan) Yamazaki (NCO)	(United States) Anderson (GVL) (Peru) C. Fernandez (SPK) (Brazil) Gomiero (RIC) (Switzerland) **MacKinnon** (GVL) (Trinidad and Tobago) Powder (NCO)	(United States) Kunga (OMA) (Jamaica) Scarlett (GVL)	(United States) Ballard (KNX) (Germany) Dietrich (NCO) (Mexico) Gómez (OMA) (United States) Hernández (CHA) (Malawi) Malango (CHA) (United States) Thompson (SPK) (United States) Walker (TRM)	(England) Dominic Casciato (OMA)	
**21**	(United States) Bush (CHA)	(Cuba) Corrales (LEX) (Spain) García (NCO)	(Jamaica) Brown (LEX) (Senegal) Diouf (LEX) (Brazil) Gomiero (RIC) (Honduras) Midence (CV) (United States) Murphy (MAD)	(United States) Gebhard (MAD) (England) **Lancaster** (LEX) (England) O'Dwyer (RIC)	(Brazil) Fonseca (TRM) (United States) Fox (LEX) (Grenada) John-Brown (CV) (Scotland) King (NCO) (Nigeria) Opara (NCO) (United States) Ostrem (OMA) (United States) Sneddon (RIC)	(England) Dominic Casciato (OMA)	
**22**	(United States) **Delgado** (NCO)	(Israel) Chilaka (MAD) (Austria) Crull (MAD) (Spain) D. Fernández (KNX) (Trinidad and Tobago) Powder (NCO)	(United States) Hernández (NCO) (United States) Murphy (MAD) (United States) Ostrem (OMA) (United States) Robles (NCO)	(Colombia) Galindrez (MAD) (United States) Hoard (NCO)	(United States) Calixtro (KNX) (Spain) García (NCO) (Mexico) Gómez (OMA) (United States) Martinez (NCO) (Ghana) Mensah (CHA) (Ghana) Nuhu (OMA) (Cuba) Rendón (NCO)	(Libya) Éamon Zayed (NCO)	
**23**	(Philippines) Schipmann (MAD)	(United States) Dengler (TRM) (United States) Fitch (RIC) (Spain) García (NCO) (United States) Vinberg (CV)	(Switzerland) **MacKinnon** (GVL) (United States) Martinez (NCO) (England) Mesias (MAD) (Colombia) Velásquez (GVL)	(United States) Chaney (MAD) (England) Dolling (SPK)	(Grenada) John-Brown (CV) (United States) Langlois (NCO) (Argentina) Lombardi (TRM) (Italy) Mastrantonio (OMA) (United States) Parker (TRM) (Scotland) Steedman (TRM) (United States) Waldeck (SPK)	(Bermuda) Rick Wright (GVL)	
**24**	(Philippines) Schipmann (MAD)	(United States) Bustamante (CV) (Canada) Cela (RIC) (United States) Shultz (GVL) (England) **Skelton** (KNX)	(Honduras) Álvarez (CLT) (Mexico) Carrera-García (CV) (United States) C. Johnson (KNX) (England) O'Dwyer (RIC) (Germany) Schneider (OMA)	(Honduras) Benson (CV)	(Venezuela) Caputo (LEX) (Brazil) Dolabella (OMA) (United States) Gallardo (OMA) (Australia) Heckenberg (CV) (United States) Rankenburg (GVL) (United States) Torr (CV) (United States) Walker (TRM)	(Serbia) Ilija Ilić (KNX)	
**25**	(United States) **Levy** (CLT)	(United States) Fox (LEX) (El Salvador) Mariona (CV) (Cuba) Rendón (NCO) (England) Thorn (TRM)	(United States) Cerritos (LEX) (Senegal) Diouf (LEX) (South Sudan) Jiba (OMA) (United States) Lee (GVL) (Switzerland) MacKinnon (GVL)	(Colombia) L. Castro (GVL)	(Grenada) Belmar (CLT) (Italy) Corvino (GVL) (United States) Garibay (KNX) (Mexico) Gómez (OMA) (Australia) Heckenberg (CV) (Argentina) Lombardi (TRM) (Honduras) Obregón (CLT)	(Libya) Éamon Zayed (NCO)	
**Bold** denotes Player of the Week

== See also ==
- USL League One
