= Billy King (footballer, born 1994) =

Scottish footballer

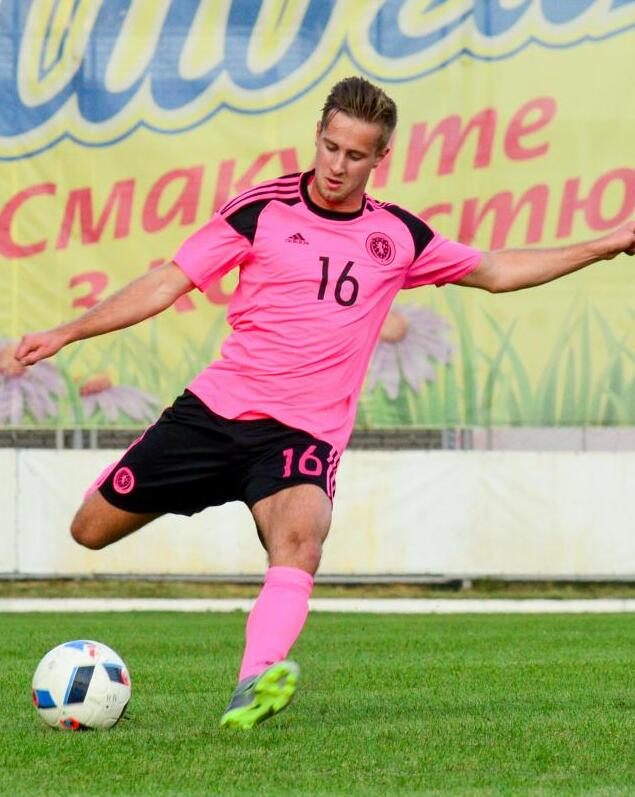

Personal information
- Date of birth: 12 May 1994 (age 32)
- Place of birth: Edinburgh, Scotland
- Height: 5 ft 9 1/4 in (1.76 m)
- Position: Winger

Team information
- Current team: Bonnyrigg Rose
- Number: 11

Youth career
- 2004–2012: Heart of Midlothian

Senior career*
Years	Team	Apps	(Gls)
2012–2017	Heart of Midlothian	86	(13)
2016	→ Rangers (loan)	12	(1)
2016–2017	→ Inverness Caledonian Thistle (loan)	26	(1)
2017–2019	Dundee United	51	(7)
2019	→ Gillingham (loan)	3	(0)
2019	Greenock Morton	6	(0)
2020–2022	St Patrick's Athletic	79	(12)
2023–2024	Northern Colorado Hailstorm	47	(12)
2025	Arbroath	7	(1)
2025–	Bonnyrigg Rose	32	(8)

International career
2009	Scotland U15	2	(0)
2009	Scotland U16	1	(0)
2012–2013	Scotland U19	6	(0)
2015–2016	Scotland U21	8	(1)
- * Club domestic league appearances and goals as of 16:49, 12 August 2026 (UTC)

Billy King (born 12 May 1994) is a Scottish professional footballer who plays as a winger for Lowland League club Bonnyrigg Rose. He has previously played for Heart of Midlothian, Rangers, Inverness Caledonian Thistle, Dundee United, Gillingham, Greenock Morton, St Patrick's Athletic, Northern Colorado Hailstorm and Arbroath, as well as representing Scotland up to under-21 level.

== Club career ==
=== Heart of Midlothian ===
King began his career with Heart of Midlothian. He was a member of the club's under-20 squad when he was promoted to the first team for their match against Ross County on 27 October 2012, where he was an unused substitute. He remained an unused substitute on three further occasions before on 30 January 2013, King aged 18, made his first team debut playing from the start in a 1–0 victory over Dundee in the Scottish Premier League. He made a total of 8 appearances over his first season in senior football.

His brother Adam King broke through to the first team and made his debut on 26 December 2013 against Kilmarnock but the two didn't feature together as Adam was substituted off at half time, the same time as Billy was substituted on. King's first career goal came on 30 March 2014 in the Edinburgh derby as he came off the bench for Dale Carrick in the 83rd minute before sealing a 2–0 win over Hibernian with a 93rd minute goal. King made 34 appearances in all competitions over the 2013–14 season, scoring 3 goals in a season that saw the club enter administration which resulted in a 15 points deduction that contributed to their relegation to the Scottish Championship for the first time since 1981.

King became a key player for Hearts in the Championship, he made 33 appearances in all competitions over the 2014–15 season, scoring 9 goals. On 28 March 2015, he started in Hearts' first game since becoming 2014–15 Scottish Championship winners, a 2–0 win over Queen of the South which was followed by in field title celebrations at Tynecastle Park. Following the club's return to the Scottish Premiership, King found his game time reduced, starting just 11 of his 20 appearances up to January 2016.

==== Rangers loan ====
In January 2016, King moved on loan to Scottish Championship side Rangers until the end of the season, with the move taking place to allow King to get first-team games in order to continue his recovery from injury. He made his first appearance for Rangers against Falkirk on 30 January 2016, coming on as a substitute for Kenny Miller, scoring the winning goal in the 90th minute. He played the full 90 minutes against Dumbarton on 5 April 2016 as Rangers clinched the 2015–16 Scottish Championship title, earning promotion to the Scottish Premiership. On 10 April 2016 came off the bench in the 2016 Scottish Challenge Cup Final at Hampden Park as his side defeated Peterhead 4–0 to win the trophy. He missed out on the 2016 Scottish Cup Final which his side lost to Hibernian, as he was cup tied, having made 1 appearance for his parent club Heart of Midlothian in an earlier round of the competition before joining Rangers. King returned to Hearts at the end of his loan spell, having made a total of 13 appearances in all competitions for the club, scoring once.

==== Inverness Caledonian Thistle loan ====
After returning to Heart of Midlothian from his loan spell at Rangers, King made his UEFA Europa League debut, coming off the bench against Estonian side FCI Tallinn in a 2–1 win at Tynecastle Park. This turned out to be the last of his 96 appearances for Hearts as he moved on a season-long loan to Inverness Caledonian Thistle two weeks later.

He made his debut on 16 July 2016 away to Cowdenbeath in the Scottish League Cup. His first goal for the club came 10 days later in the same competition in a 5–1 win away to Dunfermline Athletic at East End Park. On 18 September 2016 he scored his first league goal for Inverness against Scottish Premiership champions Celtic in a 2–2 draw at the Caledonian Stadium. King scored 3 goals in 32 appearances in all competitions over his loan spell at the club.

=== Dundee United ===
King signed a pre-contract agreement with Scottish Championship club Dundee United in May 2017. He made his debut on 15 July 2017 in a Scottish League Cup win over Raith Rovers at Tannadice Park. 4 days later he scored his first goal for the club and also got an assist in a 3–0 win away to Buckie Thistle in the Scottish League Cup. King was a key player for United over the season, scoring 8 goals in 48 appearances in all competitions over the season as they finished in third place. He made 18 appearances in the 2018–19 season, scoring 3 goals before leaving the club on loan.

==== Gillingham loan ====
On 30 January 2019, he joined EFL League One side Gillingham on loan for the remainder of the season. He made his debut for the club on 2 February 2019, coming off the bench for Connor Ogilvie in a 1–1 draw with Coventry City. King missed a penalty in the Kent Senior Cup Semi Final penalty shootout loss against Maidstone United on 19 March 2019. The final of his 4 appearances in all competitions for the club came in a 2–0 defeat at Peterborough United on 6 April 2019.

=== Greenock Morton ===
On 19 September 2019, King joined Scottish Championship club Greenock Morton until January 2020. His debut for the club came on 28 September 2019 in bad circumstances, as he came off the bench in the 77th minute in a 6–0 defeat against his old club Dundee United at Tannadice Park. He was substituted off in a 1–1 draw in a Scottish FA Cup tie with Brora Rangers in what turned out to be the final of his seven appearances for the club. It was confirmed on 30 December that he had left the club.

=== St Patrick's Athletic ===
==== 2020 season ====
On 8 January 2020 King signed for League of Ireland Premier Division side St Patrick's Athletic. He started pre-season off well, scoring a hat-trick on his first start for the club in a friendly against Fermoy as his side won 6–0. He was voted as St Patrick's Athletic Player of the Month by the club's fans for the month of February, receiving his award before the home game against Cork City on 6 March 2020, a game in which he scored his first competitive goal for the club in a 1–0 win. He played in 14 of the club's 18 league games over the course of the season which was shortened due to the Coronavirus pandemic, as his side missed out on European football on the final day of the season, finishing in 6th place. He signed a new contract with the club on 11 January 2021.

==== 2021 season ====
King scored his first goal of the 2021 season on 27 March 2021, coming off the bench for Robbie Benson in the 80th minute before volleying home the winner in the 91st minute against newly promoted Drogheda United in his side's first home game of the season. King's second goal of the season came on 23 April 2021 when he received a pass on the turn before beating 4 players and smashing his shot in from 20 yards to open the scoring in a 2–0 win away to Finn Harps. On 24 May 2021, he scored an 84th minute header to level the game at 2–2 away to Derry City at the Ryan McBride Brandywell Stadium. King scored his first brace for the club on 23 July 2021, scoring the first and last goals of a 6–0 win over Bray Wanderers in the FAI Cup. On 3 September 2021, he scored the opening goal of a 3–2 win over Longford Town, finding the top corner from 25 yards out. King opened the scoring in a 3–1 FAI Cup Semi-final win over Dundalk on 22 October 2021 with a 25 yard strike in the 26th minute helping to earn a place in the 2021 FAI Cup Final. 3 days later, he strangely scored yet another opening goal in the 26th minute, again from 25 yards and against the same opposition in Dundalk, with King's goal enough to earn his side the 3 points in the league fixture. He continued his rich vein of form by opening the scoring in the Dublin City derby against Bohemians on 1 November 2021. On 12 November 2021, he scored his 10th goal of the season by opening the scoring in a 2–2 draw with Finn Harps that secured a second place finish in the league for his side. On 28 November 2021 King scored his penalty in the 2021 FAI Cup Final penalty shootout, as his side defeated rivals Bohemians 4–3 on penalties following a 1–1 draw after extra time in front of a record FAI Cup Final crowd of 37,126 at the Aviva Stadium. King featured in all 41 of his sides games through the 2021 season, scoring 10 goals.

==== 2022 season ====
On 22 December 2021, it was announced that King had signed a new contract with the Saints. On 11 February 2022, King was in the starting XI for the 2022 President of Ireland's Cup against Shamrock Rovers at Tallaght Stadium, as his side lost 5–4 on penalties after a 1–1 draw. On 6 May 2022, King scored his first goal of the season in a 4–0 win away to Drogheda United, smashing home his side's third goal after providing the assist for Darragh Burns' opener. On 24 June 2022, King scored a brace in a 2–2 draw away to Finn Harps. He followed that up by scoring the opener in a 3–0 win over Drogheda United at Richmond Park. King's first appearance in European football with the club came on 28 July 2022 in a 0–0 draw away to Slovenian side NŠ Mura with his side winning 6–5 on penalties to earn a tie with Bulgarian side CSKA Sofia in the next round. He featured in both a 1–0 away win in Sofia and in the home leg which saw his side narrowly beaten 2–0 following a controversial late penalty. He finished the season with 4 goals in 34 appearances in all competitions as his side finished in 4th place in the league, securing European football once again.

=== Northern Colorado Hailstorm ===
On 27 January 2023, King signed for USL League One side Northern Colorado Hailstorm. On 29 September 2024, King was part of the side that won the 2024 USL Cup by defeating Forward Madison 5–4 on penalties after a 1–1 draw, to become the competition's first ever winners.

=== Arbroath ===
On 25 January 2025, King returned home, signing for Scottish League One club Arbroath. He scored 1 goal in 7 appearances by the end of the season, as his side won the 2024–25 Scottish League One title to gain promotion to the Scottish Championship.

=== Bonnyrigg Rose ===
On 31 May 2025, King signed for Bonnyrigg Rose, who had recently been relegated to the Lowland League.

== International career ==
He has represented Scotland at under-15 and at under-16 level. King was called up to the under-19 team in August 2012, for an international challenge match against Norway but had to withdraw. He then took part in their Dutch training camp in January, playing in a friendly against Dutch team Telstar.

He was called up to the Scotland under-21 squad on 31 August 2014.

== Personal life ==
Born in Edinburgh, King grew up in the Portobello area of the city a Hearts fan and attended Portobello High School. He has three younger brothers Adam, who plays for Alloa Athletic, Ross and Robbie.

== Career statistics ==
As of match played 8 August 2026

Appearances and goals by club, season and competition
Club	Season	League			National Cup (Note: Includes Scottish Cup, FA Cup, FAI Cup & U.S. Open Cup)		League Cup (Note: Includes Scottish League Cup, EFL Cup, USL Cup & Lowland League Cup)		Continental		Other		Total	
Club	Season	Division	Apps	Goals	Apps	Goals	Apps	Goals	Apps	Goals	Apps	Goals	Apps	Goals
Heart of Midlothian	2012–13	Scottish Premiership	8	0	0	0	0	0	0 (Note: Appearances in UEFA Europa League)	0	—		8	0
Heart of Midlothian	2013–14	Scottish Premiership	32	3	0	0	2	0	—		—		34	3
Heart of Midlothian	2014–15	Scottish Championship	31	8	1	0	0	0	—		1 (Note: Appearances in Scottish Challenge Cup)	1	33	9
Heart of Midlothian	2015–16	Scottish Premiership	15	2	1	0	4	0	—		—		20	2
Heart of Midlothian	2016–17	Scottish Premiership	0	0	—		—		1	0	—		1	0
Heart of Midlothian	Total		86	13	2	0	6	0	1	0	1	1	96	14
Rangers (loan)	2015–16	Scottish Championship	12	1	—		—		—		1	0	13	1
Inverness Caledonian Thistle (loan)	2016–17	Scottish Premiership	26	1	1	0	5	2	—		—		32	3
Dundee United	2017–18	Scottish Championship	35	5	2	0	5	3	—		6 (Note: 2 appearances in Scottish Challenge Cup and 4 appearances in the Scottish Premiership play-offs)	0	48	8
Dundee United	2018–19	Scottish Championship	16	2	1	1	0	0	—		1	0	18	3
Dundee United	Total		51	7	3	1	5	3	—		7	0	66	11
Gillingham (loan)	2018–19	EFL League One	3	0	—		—		—		1 (Note: Appearance in the Kent Senior Cup)	0	4	0
Greenock Morton	2019–20	Scottish Championship	6	0	1	0	—		—		—		7	0
St Patrick's Athletic	2020	LOI Premier Division	14	1	0	0	—		—		—		14	1
St Patrick's Athletic	2021	LOI Premier Division	36	7	5	3	—		—		—		41	10
St Patrick's Athletic	2022	LOI Premier Division	29	4	1	0	—		3 (Note: Appearances in UEFA Europa Conference League)	0	1 (Note: Appearance in the President of Ireland's Cup)	0	34	4
St Patrick's Athletic	Total		79	12	6	3	—		3	0	1	0	89	15
Northern Colorado Hailstorm	2023	USL League One	31	8	1	0	—		—		2 (Note: Appearances in 2023 USL League One Playoffs)	0	34	8
Northern Colorado Hailstorm	2024	USL League One	15	4	1	0	9	1	—		0	0	25	5
Northern Colorado Hailstorm	Total		46	12	2	0	9	1	—		2	0	59	13
Arbroath	2024–25	Scottish League One	7	1	—		—		—		—		7	1
Bonnyrigg Rose	2025–26	Lowland League	28	7	3	0	4	0	—		0	0	35	7
Bonnyrigg Rose	2026–27	Lowland League	4	1	0	0	0	0	—		0	0	4	1
Bonnyrigg Rose	Total		32	8	3	0	4	0	—		0	0	39	8
Career total			348	55	18	5	29	6	4	0	13	1	412	66

== Honours ==
=== Club ===
Heart of Midlothian

- Scottish Championship: 2014–15

Rangers

- Scottish Championship: 2015–16
- Scottish Challenge Cup: 2015–16

St Patrick's Athletic

- FAI Cup: 2021

Northern Colorado Hailstorm

- USL Cup: 2024

Arbroath

- Scottish League One: 2024–25
