= Bruno Rendón =

Cuban footballer (born 2000)

Personal information
- Full name: Bruno Manuel Rendón Cardoso
- Date of birth: 7 May 2000 (age 26)
- Place of birth: Matanzas, Cuba
- Height: 6 ft 2 in (1.88 m)
- Position: Midfielder

Team information
- Current team: Indy Eleven
- Number: 27

Senior career*
Years	Team	Apps	(Gls)
2022	Syracuse Pulse	14	(3)
2023–2024	Northern Colorado Hailstorm	53	(11)
2025–	Indy Eleven	54	(13)

International career^{‡}
2017	Cuba U17	5	(1)
2018	Cuba U20	4	(0)
- * Club domestic league appearances and goals as of 19:15, 7 November 2026 (UTC) ‡ National team caps and goals as of 21:12, 20 February 2025 UTC

Bruno Manuel Rendón Cardoso (born 7 May 2000) is a professional footballer who plays as a midfielder for USL Championship club Indy Eleven.

Born in Matanzas, Cuba, Rendón featured for the Cuban under-17 and under-20 national teams before moving to the United States. He won the 2024 USL League One Defender of the Year award with Northern Colorado Hailstorm FC.

== Early life ==
Rendón was born in Matanzas, Cuba, where he lived with his mother and grandmother.

== Club career ==
Rendón began his career in 2022 with National Independent Soccer Association club Syracuse Pulse scoring three goals in 15 total matches.

USL League One club Northern Colorado Hailstorm FC signed Rendón ahead of the 2023 season, where he scored 5 goals in 30 league matches. He was named to the 2023 USL League One All-League Second Team. In the 2024 season, Rendón scored 6 goals in 23 league appearances. He also scored a competition-record 9 additional goals in the 2024 USL Cup, including the Northern Colorado's only goal in the final, which they went on to win on penalties against Forward Madison FC. Rendón was voted 2024 USL League One Defender of the Year and named to the 2024 All-League First Team.

On 5 December 2024, USL Championship club Indy Eleven announced they had signed Rendón ahead of the 2025 season. He made his debut for the club on 15 March 2025 in a 3–1 away league win over Miami FC. Rendón scored his first goal for the club on 22 March, in a 1–1 away draw against Lexington SC.

== International career ==
When living in Cuba, Rendón featured for the Cuba youth national teams. He first played for the Under-17 national team, scoring a goal in his debut in a 1–1 draw with Suriname in the 2017 CONCACAF U-17 Championship on 22 April 2017.

In 2018. Rendón was called up again to represent Cuba at the 2018 CONCACAF U-20 Championship. Rendón featured in 4 separate matches as Cuba failed to qualify for the knockout stage despite only one loss against Honduras.

=== Defection ===
Following Cuba's exit from the 2018 CONCACAF U-20 Championship tournament, Rendón and 11 other Cuban players defected and chose to remain in the United States.

== Personal life ==
Following his defection from Cuba and residency in the United States, Rendón has stated his intent to receive U.S. citizenship.

== Career statistics ==
=== Club ===
As of match played 18 October 2025.

Appearances and goals by club, season and competition
Club	Season	League			National cup (Note: Includes U.S. Open Cup)		League cup (Note: Includes USL Cup)		Total	
Club	Season	Division	Apps	Goals	Apps	Goals	Apps	Goals	Apps	Goals
Syracuse Pulse	2022	NISA	14	3	1	0	–		15	3
Syracuse Pulse	Total		14	3	1	0	–		15	3
Northern Colorado Hailstorm FC	2023	USL League One	30	5	2	0	–		32	5
Northern Colorado Hailstorm FC	2024	USL League One	23	6	2	0	8	9	33	15
Northern Colorado Hailstorm FC	Total		53	11	4	0	8	9	65	20
Indy Eleven	2025	USL Championship	25	3	2	0	5	0	32	3
Indy Eleven	Total		25	3	2	0	5	0	32	3
Career total			92	17	7	0	13	9	112	26

== Honors ==
=== Club ===
Northern Colorado Hailstorm

- USL Cup: 2024

=== Individual ===
- USL League One Defender of the Year: 2024
- USL League One All-League Second Team: 2023
- USL League One All-League First Team: 2024
- USL Cup Top Goalscorer: 2024

== See also ==
- List of Cuban football players who have defected to the United States
