= Parker Ford =

Parker Ford may refer to:

- Parker Ford (ice hockey) (born 2000), American ice hockey player
- Parker Ford, Pennsylvania, unincorporated community
- Ford Parker, American soccer player
- Battle of Cool Spring, sometimes called the Battle of Parker's Ford
