= Christian Garner =

American soccer player (born 2000)

Personal information
- Full name: Christian Garner
- Date of birth: March 9, 2000 (age 26)
- Place of birth: Orleans, Massachusetts, United States
- Height: 6 ft 0 in (1.83 m)
- Position: Goalkeeper

Youth career
- –2018: NEFC

College career
Years	Team	Apps	(Gls)
2018–2021	Boston College Eagles	28	(0)
2022	Northwestern Wildcats	13	(0)

Senior career*
Years	Team	Apps	(Gls)
2021	Seacoast United Phantoms	11	(0)
2023	Pittsburgh Riverhounds	3	(0)
2024	Greenville Triumph	13	(0)
2024	→ Charleston Battery (loan)	1	(0)
2025	Charleston Battery	2	(0)
- * Club domestic league appearances and goals as of October 25, 2025

Christian Garner (born March 9, 2000) is a former American professional soccer player who played as a goalkeeper.

== Career ==
=== Youth ===
Garner was raised in Orleans, Massachusetts and attended the Brooks School. Here he helped the team to Independent School League titles in 2016 and 2017, and also earned First Team All-ISL honors in 2016 and 2017 and as an all-state selection. Garner set the single-season school shutout record with 13 shutouts and finished his career with 26 overall. Garner also played club soccer for New England Futbol Club, where he earned a state cup in 2017 as well as a NPL Finals Championship and a US Club National Cup Championship.

=== College and amateur ===
In 2018, Garner attended Boston College, where he made 28 appearances for the Eagles over four seasons. He was club captain for the team in his junior and senior year, also earning All-ACC Academic Team honors in 2021. After graduating from Boston, Garner attended Northwestern University as a graduate student. Here he made 13 appearances for the Wildcats.

During his 2021 college season, Garner also played in the USL League Two with Seacoast United Phantoms, where he made 11 appearances.

=== Professional ===
On February 9, 2023, Garner signed a one-year deal with USL Championship side Pittsburgh Riverhounds. He made his professional debut on March 24, 2023, starting in a 1–1 draw with Miami FC. After the 2023 season, his contract was not extended.

On February 1, 2024, after remaining a free agent for two months, Garner made a move to Greenville Triumph in USL League One on a deal until November 30, 2024. He made 6 League appearances for Greenville and multiple appearances in the USL Jagermeister Cup before being loaned to Charleston Battery. Garner made his debut against Indy Eleven and kept a clean-sheet, making 3 saves.

Garner was released by Greenville following their 2024 season.

On February 14, 2025, Garner returned to Charleston on a permanent deal, reuniting with Riverhounds teammates Nathan Dossantos, Langston Blackstock, and Luis Zamudio in the process. Following the 2025 season, Garner retired from playing professional soccer.
