= Missael Rodríguez =

American soccer player (born 2003)

Missael Rodriguez
Personal information
- Full name: Missael Rodriguez Padilla
- Date of birth: February 9, 2003 (age 23)
- Place of birth: Chicago, Illinois
- Height: 5 ft 9 in (1.75 m)
- Position: Forward

Team information
- Current team: Sporting Kansas City II
- Number: 96

Youth career
- 2017–2021: Chicago Fire

Senior career*
Years	Team	Apps	(Gls)
2021–2024	Chicago Fire	1	(0)
2021–2023	→ Chicago Fire II (loan)	40	(7)
2024	→ Union Omaha (loan)	19	(3)
2025	The Town FC	23	(8)
2026–	Sporting Kansas City II	23	(8)
- * Club domestic league appearances and goals

Missael Rodriguez Padilla (born February 9, 2003) is an American professional soccer player who plays as a forward who currently plays for MLS Next Pro club Sporting Kansas City II.

== Career ==
=== Chicago Fire ===
At the end of the 2017-18 season, Rodriguez joined the Chicago Fire academy, scoring 10 goals and registering 3 assists in 19 games for the under-15s.

In 2021, Chicago signed him to the first team as a Homegrown Player.

Rodriguez played 3 times for Chicago Fire during his early years at the club. Rodriguez made his official Chicago debut, starting in the 2-2 draw with Union Omaha, though they were knocked out by them on penalties. He made his only U.S. Open Cup game in 2023 in the 3-0 win against Chicago House AC, replacing Alonso Aceves. He made his Major League Soccer debut against CF Montréal, replacing Georgios Koutsias in the 3-0 win.

Ahead of the 2024 Major League Soccer season, Rodriguez was loaned out to Union Omaha. He was waived from the club after returning from his loan at Omaha.

=== Chicago Fire II ===
However, he wouldn't play any games with the first team and was thus assigned to the Chicago Fire FC II in MLS Next Pro, beginning to play for them in 2022, the league's inaugural season. Rodriguez made his debut for Chicago Fire II in the 3-1 win against FC Cincinnati 2, coming of the bench and replacing Victor Bezerra. He got his first start in a 3-0 loss to New York City FC II. He scored a late goal in the next match, a 6-2 win against Toronto FC II. Now a staple in the first team, Rodriguez scored the opener in an eventual 3-1 loss to Inter Miami CF II. In another match against Rochester New York FC, he scored the equalizer and scored his penalty-kick to give Chicago the win. It was announced that Rodriguez would stay with Chicago in the 2023 season.

In the 2023 MLS Next Pro season, Rodriguez scored 2 goals in 20 games: scoring in a 2-1 loss to Philadelphia Union II and in a 5-1 road win against FC Cincinnati 2.

=== Loan to Union Omaha ===
On March 14, 2024, Missael Rodriguez joined USL League One team, Union Omaha on loan from Chicago Fire. He debuted 2 days later in the 2-1 win against Central Valley Fuego, playing 45 minutes. In the USL Jagermeister Cup, he started against Northern Colorado Hailstorm, scoring a brace. His goals came in the 44' and 45+1' minute. He scored his first league goal in a 4-2 win against South Georgia Tormenta. He then added a brace against Charlotte Independence in the league.

=== The Town FC ===
Following his time in Omaha, Rodriguez signed for The Town FC, the MLS Next Pro affiliate of the San Jose Earthquakes.

=== Sporting Kansas City II ===
For the 2026 season, Missael Rodriguez signed with Sporting Kansas City II of MLS Next Pro.
