= Austin Pack =

American soccer player (born 1994)

Personal information
- Date of birth: February 15, 1994 (age 32)
- Place of birth: Jacksonville, Florida, United States
- Height: 1.91 m (6 ft 3 in)
- Position: Goalkeeper

Team information
- Current team: Tampa Bay Rowdies
- Number: 24

College career
Years	Team	Apps	(Gls)
2012–2015	Charlotte 49ers	42	(0)

Senior career*
Years	Team	Apps	(Gls)
2014	Miami Dade FC		
2015	Carolina Dynamo	8	(0)
2016–2017	Puerto Rico FC	11	(0)
2018	Portland Timbers 2	1	(0)
2019	Pittsburgh Riverhounds SC	6	(0)
2020–2021	Charlotte Independence	19	(0)
2022	Hartford Athletic	5	(0)
2022–2024	Charlotte Independence	53	(0)
2025	South Georgia Tormenta	28	(1)
2026–	Tampa Bay Rowdies	5	(0)
- * Club domestic league appearances and goals as of 00:28, October 26, 2026 (UTC)

Austin Pack (born February 25, 1994) is an American soccer player who currently plays as a goalkeeper for the Tampa Bay Rowdies in the USL Championship.

== Career ==
=== Professional ===
On 8 April 2015, Pack signed for Puerto Rico FC for the 2016 North American Soccer League season. On 23 January 2017, Pack re-signed for Puerto Rico. Pack spent much of the 2019 USL season with the Pittsburgh Riverhounds. He then signed with Charlotte Independence in early 2020.

On January 10, 2022, Pack signed with USL Championship club Hartford Athletic. Six-months later, Pack re-signed with Charlotte Independence in the USL League One.

Pack returned to Charlotte in 2022 and was named USL League One Goalkeeper of the Year in 2023.

On January 8, 2025, Pack joined Tormenta FC of USL League One.

== Career statistics ==
=== Club ===
As of October 24, 2026

Club	Season	League			Playoffs		U.S. Open Cup		Continental		Other		Total	
Club	Season	Division	Apps	Goals	Apps	Goals	Apps	Goals	Apps	Goals	Apps	Goals	Apps	Goals
Carolina Dynamo	2015	PDL	8	0	–		–		–		–		8	0
Puerto Rico FC	2016	NASL	0	0	–		0	0	–		–		0	0
Puerto Rico FC	2017	NASL	11	0	–		–		1 (Note: Appearance in Caribbean Club Championship)	0	–		12	0
Puerto Rico FC	Total		11	0	0	0	0	0	1	0	0	0	12	0
Portland Timbers 2	2018	USL	1	0	1	0	–		–		–		2	0
Pittsburgh Riverhounds SC	2019	USLC	6	0	0	0	1	0	–		–		7	0
Charlotte Independence	2021	USLC	19	0	2	0	0	0	–		–		21	0
Hartford Athletic	2022	USLC	5	0	0	0	0	0	–		–		5	0
Charlotte Independence	2022	USL1	1	0	0	0	0	0	–		–		1	0
Charlotte Independence	2023	USL1	32	0	3	0	2	0	–		–		36	0
Charlotte Independence	2024	USL1	22	0	1	0	3	0	–		9 (Note: Appearances in USL League One Cup)	0	35	0
Tormenta FC	2025	USL1	28	1	1	0	2	0	–		1 (Note: Appearance in USL Cup)	0	32	1
Tampa Bay Rowdies	2026	USLC	5	0	0	0	–		–		0	0	5	0
Career total			138	1	8	0	7	0	1	0	10	0	164	1
