= Darren Powell (soccer coach) =

English football coach

Personal information
- Date of birth: 26 September 1972 (age 54)
- Place of birth: Nottingham, England

Managerial career
- Years: Team
- 1998–2001: Greensboro Pride
- 2001–2004: UNC Greensboro Spartans (assistant)
- 2005–2014: Elon Phoenix
- 2014–2016: Orlando City SC (academy director)
- 2016–2019: San Antonio FC
- 2020–2023: Inter Miami (director of player development)
- 2020: Fort Lauderdale CF (assistant)
- 2021–2022: Inter Miami II
- 2023: Inter Miami (assistant)
- 2024: Lexington SC
- 2025: Nashville SC (Academy Director)

Darren Powell is an English football coach who currently is the Academy Director at Nashville SC. He has been successful in several levels as a coach in USA. He is originally from Nottingham, England.

== Career ==
In March, 2025 Powell joined Nashville SC in the Major League Soccer as the Academy Director.

After leading Lexington SC during the 2024 USL League One season, Powell transitioned into a technical leadership role with the club.

On 16 March 2021, Powell was named head coach of Fort Lauderdale CF in USL League One.

On 30 October 2019, it was announced that Powell and San Antonio FC had mutually parted ways.
