= Edward Delgado =

American soccer player (born 1998)

Personal information
- Date of birth: January 23, 1998 (age 28)
- Place of birth: Oxnard, California, United States
- Height: 6 ft 3 in (1.91 m)
- Position: Goalkeeper

Team information
- Current team: FC Naples
- Number: 1

Youth career
- Santa Barbara SC

College career
Years	Team	Apps	(Gls)
2016–2019	Westmont Warriors	62	(0)

Senior career*
Years	Team	Apps	(Gls)
2016–2019	Ventura County Fusion	3	(0)
2020	Las Vegas Lights	10	(0)
2021–2022	Phoenix Rising	4	(0)
2023–2024	Northern Colorado Hailstorm	68	(0)
2025–	FC Naples	57	(0)
- * Club domestic league appearances and goals as of October 31, 2026

Edward "Lalo" Delgado (born January 23, 1998) is an American professional soccer player who currently plays as a goalkeeper for FC Naples in USL League One.

== Career ==
=== Youth and college ===
Delgado played four years of college soccer at Westmont College between 2016 and 2019.

While at college, Delgardo also appeared for USL PDL side Ventura County Fusion in the summers.

=== Professional ===
On March 4, 2020, Delgado signed for USL Championship side Las Vegas Lights. He made his debut on March 7, 2020, starting in a 1–1 draw with San Diego Loyal SC. On April 1, 2021, Delgado signed with Phoenix Rising FC, also of the USL Championship.

On 23 January 2023, Delgado signed with Northern Colorado Hailstorm FC of USL League One. In September 2024, Hailstorm FC won the 2024 USL Cup. The club's franchise agreement with USL was terminated in November 2024.

On 20 December 2024, USL League One expansion club FC Naples announced that they had signed Delgado as their first goalkeeper.
