= Nil Vinyals =

Spanish footballer (born 1996)

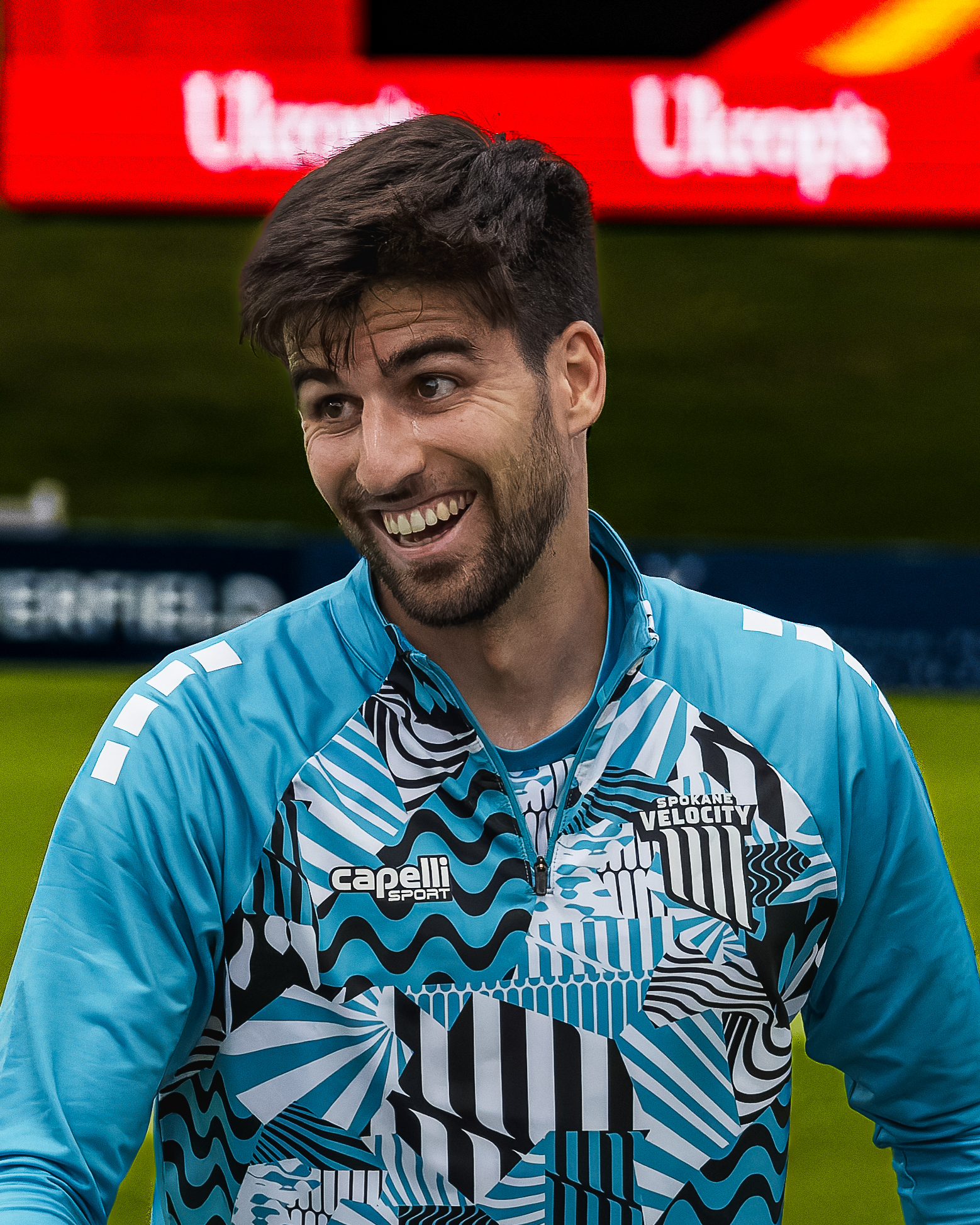
- Vinyals with Spokane Velocity in 2026

Personal information
- Full name: Nil Vinyals Corao
- Date of birth: 21 September 1996 (age 30)
- Place of birth: Barcelona, Spain
- Height: 1.80 m (5 ft 11 in)
- Position: Attacking midfielder

Team information
- Current team: Spokane Velocity
- Number: 8

Youth career
- Barcelona Futsal
- Junior FC

College career
Years	Team	Apps	(Gls)
2014–2016	UU Bulldogs		
2016–2018	Winthrop Eagles	50	(2)

Senior career*
Years	Team	Apps	(Gls)
2017–2020	Tormenta FC	34	(4)
2021–2024	Richmond Kickers	108	(19)
2025–	Spokane Velocity	58	(8)
- * Club domestic league appearances and goals as of 1 November 2026

Nil Vinyals Ciero (born 21 September 1996) is a Spanish professional footballer that plays as a attacking midfielder for Spokane Velocity in USL League One.

== Early life and youth career ==
Nil Vinyals Ciero was born on 21 September 1996, in Barcelona, Spain. He started his career playing for Barcelona Futsal before going to Junior FC. He started high school at St. Paul's School before going to college.

== Personal life ==
His father Jordi, is also a former professional footballer that played for Barcelona. His father even coached the youth academy and the reserve team for the Catalan club. He is currently the coach of Yunnan Yukun, a club in the Chinese Super League.

== College career ==
Vinyals started college at Union University Bulldogs after graduating from high school in 2014. However, he would transfer to the Winthrop Eagles the following year. He scored his first goal for the Eagles in the 2016 season and would also score a goal in the 2017 season. In total, Vinyals played 50 games and scored two goals across three seasons.

== Professional career ==
=== South Georgia Tormenta ===
On 1 May 2017, Premier Development League club Tormenta FC signed Vinyals on an academy contract, while still in college. The following year, Vinyals signed another academy contract with Tormenta FC, where he would carry his team to first place in the in their Conference and made it to the playoffs in the first of the club's history, however they would get knocked out of Southern Conference semi-finals to The Villages SC.

==== 2019 ====
On 28 September 2018, Vinyals signed for Tormenta FC on a permanent basis for the club's inaugural season in the newly formed USL League One. On 29 March 2019, Vinyals made his debut for 2019 season in a 1–0 win against Greenville Triumph. He would make 19 total appearances in the 2019 season.

==== 2020 ====
He started his first game for Tormenta in the 2020 season in a 2–2 draw against Chattanooga Red Wolves on 25 July 2020. On 1 August 2020, Vinyals would scored his first two goals for Tormenta in their 2–0 win over Orlando City B. On 17 October 2020, he would assist a goal for Marco Micaletto in a 1–0 away win against the Richmond Kickers. Vinyals scored his third goal of season in a 4–0 win against New England Revolution II. Vinyals scored his last goal for Tormenta in a 2–1 loss against North Texas SC. After scoring and making his final appearance, he was subbed off for Tristan DeLoach.

=== Richmond Kickers ===
==== 2021 ====
On 11 February 2021, Vinyals signed for the Richmond Kickers in USL League One. Vinyals made his debut for the Kickers in a 1–0 loss the Greenville Triumph. He would score his first goal in a 2–1 loss against Fort Lauderdale CF. On 5 June 2021, Vinyals would assist goals for Emiliano Terzaghi and Juan Pablo Monticelli in a 3–2 win against New England Revolution II.

He would score again in a 2–1 loss against Toronto FC II. On 9 October 2021, he got his fifth goal contribution by crossing it to Ivan Magalhães where he would score the first goal in a 2–1 win against North Texas SC. He would record his six goal contribution in a 3–2 win against Forward Madison, where he assisted a goal for Chris Cole. The Kickers would make it to the playoffs, but would lose in the first round against FC Tucson. In the 2021 season, he made 27 appearances and scored two goals.

==== 2022 ====
Vinyals scored his first two goals in the 2022 season in a dominating 4–0 win against FC Tucson, he would also provide an assist to Matt Bentley. On 17 June 2022, he scored again in a 3–2 win against Northern Colorado Hailstorm. Vinyals scored in a 2–1 loss against Forward Madison.

On 26 July 2022, Vinyals assisted a goal for Emiliano Terzaghi in a 2–3 away win against North Carolina FC. Vinyals scored another goal and assisted Ethan Vanacore-Decker in a 2–3 win against Union Omaha. On 16 September 2022, he assisted a goal for Owayne Gordon 2–2 draw against Chattanooga Red Wolves. He would score his goal contribution of the season assisting a goal from a free kick to Nathan Aune in a 1–1 draw against Tormenta FC.

The Kickers finished the regular season placing first, and advanced to the playoffs, however they would lose to the Chattanooga Red Wolves 1–0 in the first round. In the 2022 season, Vinyals made 28 appearances and scored 5 goals.

==== 2023 ====
On 4 January 2023, Vinyals signed a multi-year deal keeping him at the club until the end of the 2024 season. He played his first game in the 2023 season in a 0–0 draw against Charlotte Independence. On 1 July 2023, he scored his first goal of the season scoring in a 2–0 win against Chattanooga Red Wolves. He would score a brace in a 2–2 draw against Lexington SC. On 6 October 2023, Vinyals wore the captains armband supplying a 2–2 draw against One Knoxville. He would also supply a goal in a 4–5 loss against Central Valley Fuego FC.

==== 2024 ====
On 6 April 2024, he scored his first goal of the season in a 3–2 loss against Central Valley Fuego FC. He scored his second goal in a 2–2 draw against Lexington SC. He would leave the club when his contract expired in 2024.

=== Spokane Velocity ===
On 21 February 2025, Vinyals joined Spokane Velocity. He would score his first goal for Spokane in 1–1 draw against expansion club Texoma FC. In the 2025 season he scored 4 goals in 30 appearances.

He scored his first goal of the 2026 season in a 3–1 win over AV Alta.
