= Ford Parker =

American soccer player

Personal information
- Full name: Ford Donovan Parker
- Date of birth: August 16, 1996 (age 30)
- Place of birth: Albuquerque, New Mexico, United States
- Height: 6 ft 3 in (1.91 m)
- Position: Goalkeeper

Youth career
- 2013–2015: Rio Rapids SC ’97

College career
| Years | Team | Apps | (Gls) |
| 2015–2018 | New Mexico Lobos | 18 | (0) |
| 2019 | UC Irvine Anteaters | 18 | (0) |

Senior career*
| Years | Team | Apps | (Gls) |
| 2017 | Colorado Rapids U23 | 4 | (0) |
| 2018 | Albuquerque Sol | 6 | (0) |
| 2020–2021 | Birmingham Legion | 2 | (0) |
| 2022–2023 | New Mexico United | 4 | (0) |
| 2024 | South Georgia Tormenta | 16 | (0) |
- * Club domestic league appearances and goals as of November 23, 2024

Ford Donovan Parker (born August 16, 1996) is an American professional soccer player.

== Career ==
=== Youth, college & amateur ===
Parker played youth soccer with Rio Rapids from 2013 to 2015, before going to play college soccer at the University of New Mexico. Parker redshirted in 2015, then missed most of the 2016 season and the entire 2017 season. Parker made 14 further appearances for the Lobos in his junior year. For his senior year, Parker transferred to the University of California, Irvine, where he made 18 appearances for the Anteaters.

Whilst at college, Parker also played in the USL PDL with spells at Colorado Rapids U23 in 2017 and Albuquerque Sol in 2018.

=== Professional ===
On February 4, 2020, Parker signed his first professional contract with USL Championship side Birmingham Legion after impressing the club at an open tryout. Parker made his professional debut on August 29, 2020, starting in a 4–1 win over Charlotte Independence.

On March 1, 2022, Parker signed with New Mexico United in his home state. He made his debut with the club on April 5, 2022, in the Second Round of the 2022 U.S. Open Cup, keeping a clean sheet in a 5–0 win over Las Vegas Legends. He made his second appearance in the Third Round, as New Mexico United lost 2–1 away at Phoenix Rising.

Parker joined USL League One club Tormenta FC on January 11, 2024.
