= Pedro Fonseca (footballer) =

Brazilian footballer (born 1997)

Personal information
- Date of birth: 20 May 1997 (age 29)
- Place of birth: Rio de Janeiro, Brazil
- Height: 1.73 m (5 ft 8 in)
- Positions: Winger; forward

Team information
- Current team: Charlotte Independence
- Number: 77

Youth career
- 2015–2016: Fluminense
- 2016: → Espanyol (loan)
- 2016: → Marítimo (loan)
- 2016–2018: FC Golden State Force

College career
Years	Team	Apps	(Gls)
2018–2021	Louisville Cardinals	48	(15)

Senior career*
Years	Team	Apps	(Gls)
2016–2021	FC Golden State Force	28	(21)
2022	Real Monarchs	20	(7)
2023–2024	South Georgia Tormenta	51	(13)
2025–	Charlotte Independence	7	(0)
- * Club domestic league appearances and goals as of 13:07, 1 November 2025 (UTC)

Pedro Fonseca (born 20 May 1997) is a Brazilian footballer who most recently played as a winger for Charlotte Independence in the USL League One.

== Career ==
=== Youth ===
Fonseca was born in Rio de Janeiro, and spent time with the academy side at Fluminense, before spending spells on loan in Spain with Espanyol and later with Portuguese side Marítimo in 2016. Fonseca then made the decision to move to the United States, whilst also studying in Brazil, with the plan to play college soccer when he graduated. Whilst in the United States, Fonseca joined FC Golden State, appearing for the team in the USL PDL, helping them win the Western Conference title in 2017 and playing in the Lamar Hunt U.S. Open Cup against LA Galaxy in 2018.

=== College ===
In 2018, Fonseca committed to playing college soccer at the University of Louisville. In four seasons with the Cardinals, Fonseca went on to make 48 appearances, scoring 15 goals and adding 16 assists. He was named All-ACC First Team and United Soccer Coaches All-South Region Second Team in 2021, and All-ACC Second Team in 2020.

While at college, Fonseca continued to appear for FC Golden State Force in both the USL League Two, formerly USL PDL, and the National Premier Soccer League.

=== Professional ===
On 11 January 2022, Fonseca was selected 53rd overall in the 2022 MLS SuperDraft by Real Salt Lake. On 9 February 2022, Fonseca signed with Salt Lake's MLS Next Pro side Real Monarchs. During the 2022 season, Fonseca went on to make 20 appearances for the Monarchs, scoring seven goals and tallying four assists, earning him the Most Valuable Player award for the club at the end of the year.

On 26 January 2023, Fonseca signed with USL League One side South Georgia Tormenta on a two-year deal.

On 6 June 2025, Fonseca joined USL League One side Charlotte Independence.
