= Luis Álvarez (footballer) =

Honduran footballer (born 2003)

Personal information
- Full name: Luis Daniel Álvarez Escoto
- Date of birth: January 25, 2003 (age 23)
- Place of birth: Honduras
- Height: 5 ft 8 in (1.73 m)
- Position: Attacking midfielder

Team information
- Current team: Charlotte Independence (on loan from Tampa Bay Rowdies)
- Number: 47

Youth career
- –2021: Lobos UPNFM

Senior career*
Years	Team	Apps	(Gls)
2021–2022	Lobos UPNFM	18	(0)
2023–2025	Charlotte Independence	57	(8)
2025–	Tampa Bay Rowdies	18	(2)
2026–	→ Charlotte Independence (loan)	15	(9)
- * Club domestic league appearances and goals as of 14:55, 31 October 2026 (UTC)

Luis Daniel Álvarez Escoto (born 25 January 2003) is a Honduran footballer who currently plays for Charlotte Independence in the USL Championship on loan from Tampa Bay Rowdies.

== Career ==
Álvarez played football at the college level at the Instituto España Jesús Milla Selva before joining Liga Nacional de Fútbol Profesional de Honduras side Lobos UPNFM. Álvarez won the under-16 and under-18 championship with Lobos UPNFM before he made his professional debut with the same club two years later. On 13 January 2023, he was announced as a new signing for USL League One side Charlotte Independence.

On 6 June 2025, Álvarez was transferred to USL Championship side Tampa Bay Rowdies for undisclosed fee.

On 6 February 2026, Charlotte Independence announced they had acquired Álvarez on loan from Tampa Bay Rowdies.
