= Rick Wright (football manager) =

Bermudian football manager

Personal information
- Place of birth: Hamilton, Bermuda

College career
| Years | Team | Apps | (Gls) |
- Erskine Flying Fleet

Managerial career
- Erskine Flying Fleet
- Anderson Trojans
- 2024–: Greenville Triumph

Rick Wright is a Bermudian football manager who manages Greenville Triumph.

== Career ==
Wright worked as manager of American side Erskine Flying Fleet, the soccer team of Erskine College. After that, he was appointed manager of American side Anderson Trojans, the soccer team of Anderson University. In 2024, he was appointed manager of American side Greenville Triumph. He previously worked as the club's assistant manager. He was described as "spearhead[ed] youth initiatives such as the Academy Cup team, Pass It On clinics and Future Leaders programs" while working as their assistant manager. He almost retired from professional before working as their manager. He helped the club achieve fifth place in the league during the 2024 season.

== Personal life ==
Wright was born in Hamilton, Bermuda. He started playing football at the age of twelve in Bermuda. He attended Erskine College in the United States and played for the school's soccer team. He played for the Bermuda national football team. He obtained American citizenship. He has worked in the paper industry. He has been married. He has two children.
