= Jamie Smith (footballer, born 1997) =

English footballer (born 1997)

Personal information
- Date of birth: 25 December 1997 (age 28)
- Place of birth: Birmingham, England
- Height: 6 ft 1 in (1.85 m)
- Position: Defender

Team information
- Current team: Crown Legacy
- Number: 45

Youth career
- 2010–2016: Walsall

College career
Years	Team	Apps	(Gls)
2017–2018	Limestone Saints	37	(5)
2019–2021	NC State Wolfpack	46	(5)

Senior career*
Years	Team	Apps	(Gls)
2016–2017	Sutton United	1	(0)
2016–2017	→ Hendon (loan)	14	(0)
2018–2021	Asheville City SC	33	(3)
2022–2024	Greenville Triumph	50	(4)
2025–	Crown Legacy	11	(1)
- * Club domestic league appearances and goals as of 09:30, 27 February 2026 (UTC)

Jamie Smith (born 25 December 1997) is an English professional footballer who plays as a defender for MLS Next Pro side Crown Legacy.

== Career ==
=== Early career ===
Smith attended St Francis of Assisi Catholic College, and joined the Walsall academy at the age of 12, playing for the Walsall youth team as a two-year scholar, before being released by the club in 2016. He subsequently signed with National League side Sutton United, making a single league appearance before joining Ryman League Premier Division club Hendon on loan.

=== College ===
In 2017, Smith moved to the United States to play college soccer at Limestone University in South Carolina. Here he played two seasons for the Saints, making 37 appearances, scoring five goals and tallying two assists. While at Limestone, Smith was awarded multiple accolades including 2018 Conference Carolinas All-Tournament Team, Second-Team All-Conference Carolinas, Second-Team D2CCA All-Southeast Regio, and First-Team All-Conference Carolinas.

Smith transferred to North Carolina State University in 2019, going on to make 46 appearances with the Wolfpack, scoring five goals, and was named to the ACC Academic Honor Roll on consecutive seasons.

While at college, Smith played for amateur side Asheville City SC, appearing for the club in the NPSL during their 2018 and 2019 seasons, making 21 appearances and scoring a three goals across both seasons. He didn't appear for the team in 2020 due to the season being cancelled due to the COVID-19 pandemic. He continued with Asheville as they moved to play in the USL League Two, making twelve regular season appearances.

=== Greenville Triumph ===
On 16 March 2022, Smith signed with USL League One club Greenville Triumph after a month-long trial. He made his debut for the team on 2 April 2022, starting in a 2–0 loss to Central Valley Fuego. Smith was released by Greenville following their 2024 season.

On 21 January 2025, Smith joined MLS Next Pro side Crown Legacy. In February 2026, he signed a new contract with the club until the end of 2027, agreeing a new role as player/coach.

== Personal life ==
Smith is the son of Dean Smith, who was a former professional footballer and now head coach of Charlotte FC.
