= Lyam MacKinnon =

Swiss footballer (born 1999)

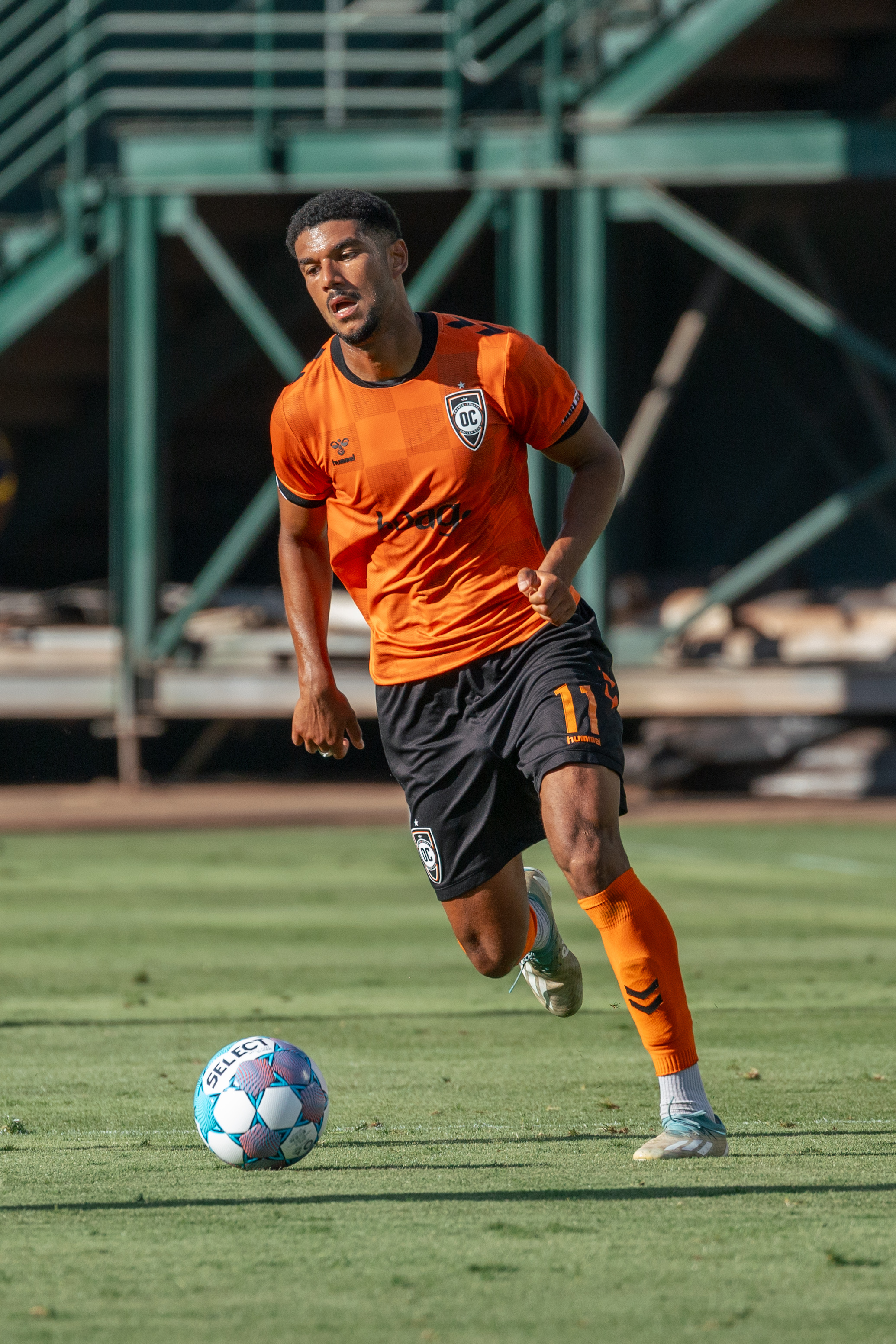

Personal information
- Full name: Lyam Khonick MacKinnon Diouf
- Date of birth: 25 September 1999 (age 27)
- Place of birth: Lausanne, Switzerland
- Height: 1.85 m (6 ft 1 in)
- Position: Forward

Team information
- Current team: Orange County SC
- Number: 11

Youth career
- –2019: Lausanne-Sport

College career
Years	Team	Apps	(Gls)
2019–2022	Villanova Wildcats	56	(17)

Senior career*
Years	Team	Apps	(Gls)
2021	Reading United	4	(1)
2022	West Chester United	1	(0)
2023–2024	Greenville Triumph	50	(23)
2025–	Orange County SC	36	(6)
- * Club domestic league appearances and goals as of 13:55, 10 November 2026 (UTC)

Lyam Khonick MacKinnon Diouf (born 25 September 1999) is a Swiss professional footballer who currently plays as a forward who currently plays for Orange County SC in the USL Championship.

== Career ==
=== Early career ===
MacKinnon was born in Lausanne in Switzerland, playing with local side Lausanne-Sport where he served as team captain of the under-18 team under-21 sides.

=== College ===
In 2019, MacKinnon moved to the United States to play college soccer at Villanova University in Villanova, Pennsylvania. In three seasons with the Wildcats, where the 2020 season was cancelled due to the COVID-19 pandemic, MacKinnon made 56 appearances, scoring 17 goals and tallying 14 assists. In 2019 and 2022, he was named Philly Soccer Six All-Rookie team and 2021 saw him earn second team All-Big East honors.

While at college, MacKinnon also spent time in the USL League Two. He made four appearances and scored a single goal for Reading United AC in 2021, and made a single appearance for West Chester United in 2022.

On 21 December 2022, it was announced that MacKinnon would enter the 2023 MLS SuperDraft. The following day he was selected 84th overall by Nashville SC.

=== Greenville Triumph ===
On 9 March 2023, MacKinnon signed his first professional contract with USL League One side Greenville Triumph. He made his debut for Greenville on 25 March 2023, starting in a 1–0 loss at home to Richmond Kickers.

On 21 June 2023, MacKinnon set the USL League One record for fastest hat trick, and then set the league record for most goals in a match when he scored four in a 5-1 victory over Chattanooga Red Wolves.

Following the 2024 season with Greenville, MacKinnon became a free agent.

=== Orange County SC ===
On 23 January 2025, MacKinnon signed a deal with USL Championship side Orange County SC.
