= TJ Bush =

American soccer player (born 1997)

Personal information
- Full name: William Garrity Bush
- Date of birth: October 27, 1997 (age 29)
- Place of birth: Fairfax, Virginia, United States
- Height: 6 ft 3 in (1.91 m)
- Position: Goalkeeper

Youth career
- –2016: Southwestern Strikers

College career
Years	Team	Apps	(Gls)
2016–2021	James Madison Dukes	66	(0)

Senior career*
Years	Team	Apps	(Gls)
2018	Northern Virginia United	4	(0)
2019	GPS Portland Phoenix	7	(0)
2021	Charlotte Independence	0	(0)
2022–2023	South Georgia Tormenta	26	(0)
2024	Chattanooga Red Wolves	22	(0)
- * Club domestic league appearances and goals as of November 22, 2024

William Garrity "TJ" Bush (born October 27, 1997) is an American soccer player who plays as a goalkeeper.

== Career ==
=== Youth ===
Bush attended South Lakes High School, where he was a four-year varsity letter winner. He earned honors including First Team All-Liberty Conference, Second Team All-Region 6A North and Washington Post All-Metropolitan Area Honorable Mention as a junior, then All-Liberty Conference Honorable Mention as a sophomore. Whilst at high school, Bush also played club soccer with Southwestern Youth Association Strikers.

=== College and amateur ===
In 2016, Bush began playing college soccer at James Madison University. He didn't make an appearance in his freshman year, but went on to make 66 appearances for the Dukes and claimed the record for career shutouts at James Madison with 30. Through his college career, Bush was named CAA All-Rookie Team, was two-time All-CAA First Team selection, was named College Soccer News Third Team All-American and was CAA Defender of the Year and VaSID Defensive Player of the Year in his senior year.

While at college, Bush appeared in the NPSL for Northern Virginia United in 2018, making four appearances. In 2019, he made seven appearances for GPS Portland Phoenix in the USL League Two.

=== Professional ===
On January 21, 2021, Bush was selected 80th overall in the 2021 MLS SuperDraft by Seattle Sounders FC. However, he didn't sign a contract with the club.

Bush signed his first professional contract on July 22, 2021, joining USL Championship side Charlotte Independence.

On February 17, 2022, Bush signed with USL League One club South Georgia Tormenta. He made his professional debut on April 30, 2022, starting in a 2–0 win over FC Tucson.

Bush moved to the Chattanooga Red Wolves on January 10, 2024.
