= Future Legends Complex =

Sports complex in Windsor, Colorado, US

- Location in the United States Location in Colorado
- Interactive map of Future Legends Complex
- Former names: TicketSmarter Stadium at Future Legends Complex
- Address: 801 Diamond Valley Dr.
- Location: Windsor, Colorado, United States
- Coordinates: 40°28′17″N 104°52′44″W
- Elevation: 4,770 ft (1,455 m)
- Capacity: Baseball: 6,500; Concerts: 20,000

Construction
- Groundbreaking: November 2019
- Opened: May 23, 2023; 3 years ago
- Years active: 3
- Cost: At least $225 million
- General contractor: Hensel Phelps Construction (before June 2021) / Jaco General Contractor Inc. (since June 2021)

Tenants
- Northern Colorado Owlz (PL) 2023– Northern Colorado Hailstorm FC (USL1) 2023–

Website
- futurelegendscomplex.com

Future Legends Complex is a 118-acre (48 ha) sports complex in the western United States, located in Windsor, Colorado, southeast of Fort Collins.

On November 30, 2020, the Orem Owlz of the Pioneer League announced that they would move from Utah to Windsor and play as the Northern Colorado Owlz starting in the 2021 season. In January 2021, they postponed their start date to 2022.

It was also announced in January 2021 that Northern Colorado Hailstorm FC, a new professional soccer team in USL League One, would debut at Future Legends Sports Complex in 2022.

The Hailstorm and Owlz will play at TicketSmarter Stadium, located in the heart of the Future Legends Complex, when construction is complete. The stadium is expected to have a capacity of 6,500 for sporting events and over 20,000 for concerts and music performances. TicketSmarter will be the primary ticketing partner of the stadium in addition to being the title sponsor through 2032.

The 118-acre (48 ha) complex features the 6,500-seat TicketSmarter Stadium, a secondary 2,500-seat capacity stadium, multiple baseball diamonds and multi-purpose fields, an indoor sports dome, an e-sports arena, Hilton-branded hotels, multiple restaurants retail locations, and will host guests for major sports tournaments, events, leagues, and more.

== Construction ==
The original contractor for the entire project was Hensel Phelps Construction out of Greeley, Colorado. Hensel Phelps had completed grading of the site, as well as construction of two multipurpose fields, and preliminary parking lot work. In June 2021, however, construction was ordered halted by the United States Department of Agriculture in order to conduct environmental and historical studies on the location.

The USDA later ruled that no preservation work was necessary and that construction could resume. During this time, the general contractor changed from Hensel Phelps Construction to Jaco General Contractor of Wichita, Kansas. According to social media for the complex, foundation work had commenced by August 2021.

TicketSmarter Stadium was expected to open in 2022. Instead, the Owlz and Hailstorm played at Jackson Field at the University of Northern Colorado that year. The sports complex partially opened on May 23, 2023, while the main stadium is expected for Spring 2024.

In July 2026, Future Legends filed for Chapter 11 bankruptcy protection, listing assets and liabilities between $100 million and $500 million.
