= Northern Colorado Hailstorm FC =

American association football club

- Full name: Northern Colorado Hailstorm Football Club
- Founded: January 12, 2021; 5 years ago
- Stadium: 4Rivers Equipment Stadium
- Capacity: 2,500
- Owners: Jeff and Casey Katofsky; Ryan Spilborghs
- Head coach: Colin Falvey
- League: The League for Clubs
- 2024: 2nd out of 12; Playoffs: Quarterfinals
- Website: www.hailstormfc.com
Home colors	Away colors	Third colors

Northern Colorado Hailstorm FC is an American professional soccer team based in Windsor, Colorado. The club was founded in 2021, and made its competitive debut in 2022. The team is owned by the Katofsky family and the Future Legends ownership group.

Currently a member of the League for Clubs, the Hailstorm were a member of USL League One from 2022 through the 2024 season, and won the USL's inaugural USL Cup in 2024.

== History ==
=== Soccer in Colorado ===
There are three other professional men’s soccer teams in the state of Colorado. Colorado Rapids play in Major League Soccer, Colorado Springs Switchbacks play in USL Championship and Colorado Rapids 2 play in MLS Next Pro.

=== Inaugural season ===
Because USL League One had an uneven number of teams for the 2022 season, Northern Colorado played the first competitive match in its history in the U.S. Open Cup on April 6 of that year, against the Colorado Springs Switchbacks. Despite losing Irvin Parra to a red card in the 27th minute, the Hailstorm won 1–0 in extra time, with Jerry Desdunes scoring their first-ever goal in the 96th. On April 9, 2022, Ethan Vanacore-Decker scored the first league goal for the Hailstorm play during their inaugural USL League One match which finished in a 1–1 draw with Richmond Kickers. In just its fourth ever competitive match, the Hailstorm defeated Major League Soccer side Real Salt Lake away from home by a score of 1–0 on April 20, 2022, to advance to the fourth round of the U.S. Open Cup. The Hailstorm were eliminated from cup competition on May 11, 2022, by fellow League One opponents Union Omaha by a score of 2–0 in the round of 32. The Hailstorm played their first home game against North Carolina FC on June 8, 2022, after 10 games (including cup matches) on the road while awaiting a home venue in Colorado. The game took place at Jackson Stadium, on the campus of the University of Northern Colorado, since the completion of TicketSmarter Stadium was delayed. The game saw Irvin Parra score the Hailstorm's first home goal in spectacular fashion, making #2 on ESPN's top ten list that evening. The Hailstorm would go on the finish the match in a 1–1 draw.

=== 2024 USL Jägermeister Cup ===
During the 2024 season of USL League One, the United Soccer League would introduce the USL Jägermeister Cup (also known as the USL Cup). The inaugural edition would only be competed among USL League One teams. Despite heading into the tournament in bad form, the Hailstorm would surprise the league with a first-place finish in the West Group. They won seven of eight games and finished with 21 points. In the first stage of the knockouts, they matched up with their rivals Union Omaha. Despite an even split in the group stage, Hailstorm would win 2–0 to secure a place in the finals. Northern Colorado would meet Forward Madison in the final, defeating them 1(5)-1(4) thanks to a saved shot by goalkeeper Edward Delgado and becoming the inaugural USL Jägermeister Cup champions.

=== Ownership troubles ===
During the 2024 USL League One season, it would be revealed that owner Jeff Katofsky was under legal fire. His ongoing project, the Future Legends Complex, was behind on $13 million in payments. Kartofsky and the complex also had $11.3 million in open legal claims filed against them. On October 16, 2024, Kartofsky would file for bankruptcy. On November 14, 2024, it was announced by USL League One that Northern Colorado Hailstorm's franchise agreement had been terminated. The club's ownership responded the same day, stating their intentions to continue playing at the Future Legends Complex in 2025.

On April 7, 2025, The League for Clubs announced that the Hailstorm had joined for the 2025 season. The National Independent Soccer Association would later confirm the Hailstorm's participation in the 2025 NISA Pro Cup. The Hailstorm would reach the semifinals of the tournament, losing to eventual champions Los Angeles Force 2-0.

Head coach Éamon Zayed departed the club in September 2025, with assistant coach Colin Falvey being promoted to the top spot.

== Stadium ==
The team played their home games at TicketSmarter Stadium located at the Future Legends Complex, a 118-acre multi-sport complex that was scheduled to open in 2022. The complex is expected to have 10 baseball fields and 12 soccer pitches. The team will share the complex with a minor-league baseball team, the Northern Colorado Owlz. The Owlz and Hailstorm "will play in a secondary location while construction concludes."

Due to construction delays, caused by a months-long investigation into the possible presence of a historical site in June 2021, the team obtained permission from the University of Northern Colorado (UNC, in Greeley, Colorado) to use their soccer facility, Jackson Stadium throughout the month of June 2022. Due the resumption of inter-collegiate soccer at UNC, the team then obtained permission from Colorado State University (CSU, in Fort Collins, Colorado) to use Canvas Stadium, an artificial turf college football stadium with a capacity of 40,000+ throughout the month of July 2022.

== Record ==
=== Year-by-year ===
As of July 28, 2025

Season	League	Division									Playoffs	US Open Cup	Top Scorer ^{1}		Head coach
Season	League	Division	P	W	L	D	GF	GA	Pts	Pos	Playoffs	US Open Cup	Player	Goal	Head coach
2022	USL1	3	30	11	10	9	42	38	42	7th	Did not qualify	R4	(United States) Irvin Parra	11	(Libya) Éamon Zayed
2023	USL1	3	32	18	6	8	59	37	62	3rd	Semifinals	R3	(United States) Trevor Amann	26	(Libya) Éamon Zayed
2024	USL1	3	22	12	5	5	34	18	41	2nd	Quarterfinals	R3	(United States) Ethan Hoard	8	(Libya) Éamon Zayed
2025	TLC	4	6	5	0	1	14	6	15	1st, Mountain Premier	Did not participate	Did not enter	Eduardo De Oliveira	3	(Libya) Éamon Zayed

1. Top Scorer includes statistics from league matches only.

=== Head coach records ===
- Includes USL Regular Season, USL Playoffs, U.S. Open Cup and TLC. Excludes friendlies.

Coach	Nationality	Start	End	Games	Win	Loss	Draw	Win %
Éamon Zayed	Libya	August 11, 2021	September 15, 2025	117	68	32	17	58.12
Colin Falvey	(Republic of Ireland) Ireland	September 18, 2025	Present					

== Honors ==
- USL Jägermeister Cup
  - Champions: 2024
- The League for Clubs
  - Mountain Premier Conference: 2025
