= USL Cup =

Soccer knockout tournament in the U.S.

USL Prinx Tires Cup
- Current display for the USL Cup
- Organizer(s): United Soccer League
- Founded: 2024; 2 years ago
- Region: United States
- Teams: 42 (2026)
- Current champion: Louisville City FC
- Most championships: Northern Colorado Hailstorm FC, Hartford Athletic, Louisville City FC (1 title)
- Broadcaster(s): ESPN+, CBS
- Motto: A Shot at Glory
- Website: uslleagueone.com
- 2026 USL Cup

The USL Cup is an annual soccer competition in men's domestic American soccer. The USL Cup is currently known as the Prinx Tires USL Cup after its title sponsor, Prinx Tires. The competition is open to all clubs in USL Championship and USL League One.

== History ==
The first USL Cup featured teams exclusively in USL League One; however, USL already intended to expand the cup beyond just that league. Richmond Kickers chairman Rob Ukrop stated at the time of the announcement that another league had been invited to participate, but wasn't “ready to jump in yet.”

The format of the 2024 USL Cup allowed a balanced league schedule for the 2024 USL League One season, with each team playing each other twice and also preserving the length of the season. Previous to the creation of the USL Cup, the league had regularly played an unbalanced schedule of 28–32 games, often playing other teams in the league three times. The introduction of USL Championship sides into the competition in 2025 re-introduced an unbalanced schedule to USL League One.

In an interview, USL Championship president Jeremy Alumbaugh and USL League One president Lee O'Neill stated that both USL Championship and USL League Two were being considered to enter the competition in future years. However, the USL Cup was not considered to be a replacement for the U.S. Open Cup, and USL teams would continue competing in future U.S. Open Cup tournaments.

O'Neill emphasized in USL's announcement of the tournament that the creation of the USL Cup would "open up more possibilities for the competitive structure going forward." The announcement also hinted that the tournament could be a precursor to a promotion and relegation system within the professional levels of the USL.

The 2025 edition of the USL Cup saw the addition of USL Championship clubs to the competition, keeping a similar format to the previous year's edition.

== Competition format ==
If a game is tied at the end of regulation, a penalty kick shootout will occur. A regulation win is worth three points, a shootout win worth two, and a shootout loss worth one.

The teams participating in the competition are split into groups of six to seven teams, with each team facing two teams in their group at home, and two others away. The top team from each group advances to a knockout round, in addition to the two teams with the most points that do not win their group.

The first edition of the competition split the teams into three groups of four teams. Teams played the other three teams in their group twice, home and away. They played an additional two games against two teams in other groups, one at home and one away. The top team from each group, plus the team with the most goals scored that did not win their group, advanced to the knockout round.

Previous USL Cup logo, when the competition was sponsored by Jägermeister.

== Sponsorship ==
Jägermeister was announced as the title sponsor for the USL Cup on March 18, 2024, three months after the initial announcement of the tournament and one month before the competition's kickoff. The announcement of Jägermeister's sponsorship stated that it was a multi-year agreement. USL Championship president Paul McDonough confirmed in an interview with Sports Business Journal that the agreement with Jägermeister was for two seasons, running through the 2025 edition of the competition. A lawsuit by ownership of Northern Colorado Hailstorm FC placed the cost of the sponsorship at $300,000 per year.

On December 16, 2025, USL announced that the USL Cup would be sponsored by Prinx Tires for its 2026 edition.

== Broadcasting ==
In February 2024, USL announced that ESPN+ would be the exclusive broadcaster for all matches in the 2024 USL Cup. For the 2025 USL Cup, games will continue to be broadcast by ESPN+, with the possibility of also being aired by various CBS networks.

== List of USL Cup finals ==
Key to list of winners
†	Match decided via a penalty shootout after regulation
(#)	Number of trophies won by club
*	2024 edition did not include USL Championship clubs

- The "Season" column refers to the season the competition was held, and wikilinks to the article about that season.

Season	Winners	Score	Runners–up	Venue	Location	Attendance
2024*	Northern Colorado Hailstorm FC (1)	1–1 † (Note: Northern Colorado Hailstorm FC won the penalty shootout 5–4.)	Forward Madison FC	4Rivers Equipment Stadium	Windsor, Colorado	3,550
2025	Hartford Athletic (1)	1–0	Sacramento Republic FC	Heart Health Park	Sacramento, California	11,569
2026	Louisville City FC (1)	1–0	Hartford Athletic	Trinity Health Stadium	Hartford, Connecticut	

== Winners and finalists ==
Club	Wins	First final won	Last final won	Runners-up	Last final lost	Total final appearances
Hartford Athletic	1	2025	2025	1	2026	2
Northern Colorado Hailstorm FC	1	2024	2024	0	—	1
Louisville City FC	1	2026	2026	0	—	1
Forward Madison FC	0	—	—	1	2024	1
Sacramento Republic FC	0	—	—	1	2025	1
