= 2026 Union Omaha season =

Union Omaha
2026 season
- Owner: Gary Green
- Head coach: Vincenzo Candela
- Stadium: Morrison Stadium
- USL League One: 1st
- USL League One Playoffs: TBD
- U.S. Open Cup: Round of 32
- USL Cup: Group Stage
- Top goalscorer: League: Diego Gutierrez and Sergio Ors Navarro (7 goals); All: Sergio Ors Navarro (10 goals)
- Highest home attendance: 2,724 (7/1 v. AVA)
- Lowest home attendance: 1,520 (4/11 v.MAD)
- Average home league attendance: 2,186
- Biggest win: 4 goals (8/16 v. RIC)
- Biggest defeat: 2 goals (twice)

The 2026 Union Omaha season was the seventh season in the soccer team's history, all of which have been in USL League One in the third division of American soccer. After playing their first six seasons at Werner Park in Papillion, Nebraska, the team will play their home games at Morrison Stadium in Downtown Omaha.

This will be the first full season for Vincenzo Candela as head coach. He replaced Dominic Casciato in the middle of the 2025 season, after Casciato left the club to become head coach of Tampa Bay Rowdies in the USL Championship. It will also be the first full season with Jamie Henderson as sporting director, after he joined the club in August 2025.

== Transfers ==
=== Transfers in ===
Date	Position	Name	From	Fee/notes	Ref.
December 9, 2025	MF	(Brazil) Gabriel Cabral	(United States) Tormenta FC		
December 15, 2025	MF	(Germany) Adrian Billhardt	(United States) Richmond Kickers		
December 19, 2025	DF	(Morocco) Younes Boudadi	(United States) Las Vegas Lights		
December 23, 2025	FW	(Germany) Kempes Tekiela	(United States) One Knoxville SC		
January 13, 2026	FW	(United States) Dylan Borczak	(United States) Lexington SC		
January 16, 2026	DF	(Algeria) Sami Guediri	(United States) Monterey Bay FC		
January 27, 2026	DF	(United States) Camron Lawrence	(United States) Monmouth Hawks		
February 3, 2026	DF	(United States) Jamie Orson	(United States) Stony Brook Seawolves		
February 11, 2026	MF	(United States) Edrey Cáceres	(United States) Lexington SC		
March 12, 2026	FW	(United States) Diego Gutierrez	(United States) Monterey Bay FC	25-Day Contract	
April 8, 2026	FW	(United States) Diego Gutierrez		Permanent Contract	

=== Loans in ===
No.	Pos.	Player	Loaned from	Start	End	Source
May 15, 2026	MF	Allen Gavilanes	(United States) Indy Eleven	May 15, 2026		
June 29, 2026	MF	Marlon Vargas	(United States) New Mexico United	June 29, 2026		

=== Transfers out ===
Date	Position	No.	Name	To	Fee/notes	Ref.
December 1, 2025	MF	28	(United States) Ryan Becher	(United States) St. Louis City 2	Loan Expired	
December 1, 2025	MF	17	(United States) Benjamin Barjolo	(United States) Orange County SC	Loan Expired	
December 5, 2025	MF	23	(Germany) Max Schneider	(United States) Tampa Bay Rowdies	Undisclosed	
December 23, 2025	MF	7	(United States) Joe Gallardo	(United States) Spokane Velocity FC		
January 7, 2026	DF	20	(United States) Charlie Ostrem	(United States) Tampa Bay Rowdies		
January 8, 2026	DF	26	(United States) Dion Acoff	(United States) Tampa Bay Rowdies		
January 17, 2026	DF	13	(United States) Anderson Holt	(United States) New York Cosmos	Undisclosed	
February 13, 2026	FW	18	(United States) Mark Bronnik	(United States) Seattle Sounders	Undisclosed	
March 25, 2026	FW	10	(Ghana) Prosper Kasim			

== Roster ==
As of August 13, 2026

=== Current roster ===
No.	Pos.	Nation	Player
3	DF	USA	Blake Malone
4	DF	GHA	Samuel Owusu
5	DF	USA	Jamie Orson
6	DF	ALG	Sami Guediri
7	MF	GER	Adrian Billhardt
8	MF	BRA	Gabriel Cabral
9	FW	MEX	Pato Botello Faz
11	FW	USA	Dylan Borczak
12	MF	USA	Marlon Vargas
14	DF	USA	Brent Kallman
15	MF	USA	Brandon Knapp
16	MF	ENG	Laurence Wootton
17	FW	USA	Diego Gutierrez
19	DF	USA	Camron Lawrence
20	FW	ESP	Sergio Ors Navarro
21	FW	MEX	Aarón Gómez
22	FW	GER	Kempes Tekiela
23	DF	MAR	Younes Boudadi
24	GK	GHA	Rashid Nuhu
27	DF	SSD	Ryen Jiba
28	MF	USA	Edrey Cáceres
77	MF	USA	Allen Gavilanes
99	GK	USA	Cole Jensen

1. On loan from New Mexico United
2. On loan from Indy Eleven

== Competitions ==
=== USL League One ===
==== Standings ====
Pos	Team	Pld	W	L	T	GF	GA	GD	Pts	Qualification
1	Charlotte Independence (S, C)	32	20	6	6	74	46	+28	66	Playoffs
2	Union Omaha	32	19	8	5	54	34	+20	62	Playoffs
3	AC Boise	32	17	8	7	51	41	+10	58	Playoffs
4	Forward Madison FC	32	16	8	8	54	30	+24	56	Playoffs
5	Spokane Velocity FC	32	16	10	6	50	44	+6	54	Playoffs

Source: USL League One
Rules for classification: 1) points; 2) total wins; 3) total goal differential; 4) total goals scored; 5) points earned against top four finishers; 6) disciplinary points; 7) drawing of lots.
(C) Champions; (S) Players' Shield winner

==== Results by round ====
Round	1	2	3	4	5	6	7	8	9	10	11	12	13	14	15	16	17	18	19	20	21	22	23	24	25	26	27	28	29	30	31	32
Stadium	A	H	H	A	H	A	H	H	A	H	A	H	A	A	A	H	H	A	A	A	H	H	A	H	H	A	H	H	A	H	A	A
Result	L	W	W	W	W	L	W	D	W	W	W	W	L	L	L	W	D	W	W	W	W											
Position	16	8	4	3	3	4	2	2	1	1	1	1	1	1	1	1	2	1	1	1	1											

Source: USL League One
A = Away; H = Home; W = Win; D = Draw; L = Loss

==== Match results ====
March 15, 2026 1	Spokane Velocity FC	1–0	Union Omaha	Spokane, WA
5:00 CDT	Kallman 67' (o.g.)	Report	Cáceres (yellow card) 52'	Stadium: ONE Spokane Stadium; Attendance: 1,669; Referee: Robert Vincze

March 22, 2026 2	Union Omaha	3–2	Athletic Club Boise	Omaha, NE
4:00 CDT	Mayaka 22' (o.g.); Ors (yellow card) 55'; Gutierrez 73', 84'; Guediri (yellow card) 86'; Nuhu (yellow card) 90+1'	Report	Ndiaye (yellow card) 21'; Brito 28' (pen.); Mayaka (yellow card) 70', (goal) 81'	Stadium: Morrison Stadium; Attendance: 1,732; Referee: Mark Verso

March 28, 2026 3	Union Omaha	2–1	Corpus Christi FC	Omaha, NE
	Knapp 17'; Wootton (yellow card) 87'; Owusu 90+3'		Roscoe (yellow card) 73'; Medina 83'; Enock Kwakwa (yellow card) 89'	Stadium: Morrison Stadium; Attendance: 1,774; Referee: Igor Bych

April 4, 2026 4	AV Alta FC	1–3	Union Omaha	Lancaster, CA
	Relerford (yellow card) 17'; Desdunes (yellow card) 40'; Ortiz 90+3'		Tekiela 8'; Pato 20' (pen.); Billhardt 82'	Stadium: Lancaster Municipal Stadium; Attendance: 3,204; Referee: Jaclyn Metz

April 11, 2026 5	Union Omaha	1–0	Forward Madison	Omaha, NE
	Pato 78' (pen.); Knapp (yellow card) 85'; Wootton (yellow card) 85'; Gómez (yellow card) 90'		Edwards (yellow card) 51'	Stadium: Morrison Stadium; Attendance: 1,520; Referee: Alejo Calume

April 18, 2026 6	Richmond Kickers	2–1	Union Omaha	Richmond, VA
	Espinal 6', (yellow card) 50'; Pannholzer 57'; FIllion (yellow card) 82'		Kallman 21'; Cabral (yellow card) 75'; Orson (yellow card) 88' (red card) 90+9'; Wootton (yellow card) 90+2'	Stadium: City Stadium; Attendance: 3,970; Referee: John Matto

May 2, 2026 7	Union Omaha	2–0	Greenville Triumph	Omaha, NE
	Kallman (yellow card) 28'; Tekiela 53', (penalty missed) 81'; Gutierrez 90+2'		Agyaakwah (yellow card) 24'; Herrera (yellow card) 80'; Fritz (yellow card) 80'; Liadi (yellow card) 90+4'	Stadium: Morrison Stadium; Attendance: 2,281; Referee: Joe Surgan

May 9, 2026 8	Union Omaha	2–2	Portland Hearts of Pine	Omaha, NE
	Pato (yellow card) 41'; Tekiela 60'; Cáceres (yellow card) 76'; Owusu 90+4'		Huck 7'; Drack (yellow card) 18'; Washington 45+1'; Varela (yellow card) 73'; Lopez (yellow card) 81'	Stadium: Morrison Stadium; Attendance: 2,406; Referee: Kalilou Jarju

May 13, 2026 9	One Knoxville SC	1–2	Union Omaha	Knoxville, TN
	Murphy 13'; McRobb (yellow card) 59'; Perkins (yellow card) 90+5'		Gutierrez 19'; Borczak (yellow card) 32'; Owusu (yellow card) 78'; Ors 84'	Stadium: Covenant Health Park; Attendance: 2,402; Referee: John Griggs

May 23, 2026 10	Union Omaha	2–0	Chattanooga Red Wolves	Omaha, NE
	Ors 57'; Gavilanes 82'; Jensen (yellow card) 89'		Lelin (yellow card) 13'; Ramos (yellow card) 37'	Stadium: Morrison Stadium; Attendance: 2,373; Referee: Carlos Rodriguez

May 27, 2026 11	New York Cosmos	1–2	Union Omaha	Patterson, NJ
	Mendonca (yellow card) 45+2'; Guenzatti (yellow card) 75'; Holt 80'; Bohui (yellow card) 90+3'		Owusu (yellow card) 24'; Guidiri (yellow card) 31'; Malone (yellow card) 49'; Gómez 60'; Pato (penalty missed) 85'; Tekiela 90+4'	Stadium: Hinchliffe Stadium; Attendance: 2,684

May 30, 2026 12	Union Omaha	2–1	FC Naples	Omaha, NE
	Boudadi (yellow card) 48'; Gutierrez 68'; Jiba 75'		Arevalo 23'; T. Gray (yellow card) 59'; Ferrín (yellow card) 63'; H. Gray (yellow card) 72'	Stadium: Morrison Stadium; Attendance: 2,196; Referee: Esad Omanovic

June 10, 2026 13	Charlotte Independence	2–0	Union Omaha	Matthews, NC
	Manin (yellow card) 20'; Marou 34', (yellow card) 42'; Álvarez 53'; Levy (yellow card) 90+1'; Ngah (yellow card) 90+3'		Cabral (yellow card) 41'; Ors (penalty missed) 70'	Stadium: Sportsplex at Matthews; Attendance: 707; Referee: Stefan Parri

June 13, 2026 14	Sarasota Paradise	2–0	Union Omaha	Lakewood Ranch, FL
6:30 CDT	Sögaard (yellow card) 21'; Terzaghi 55', (yellow card) 70'; Valentine (yellow card) 67'; Rosa 75'	Report	Ors (yellow card) 37'; Pato (yellow card) 77'	Stadium: Premier Sports Campus; Attendance: 1,571; Referee: Mario Maric

June 20, 2026 15	Athletic Club Boise	1–0	Union Omaha	Garden City, ID
8:30 CDT	Adams (yellow card) 45+1'; Moshobane 69'; Kostyshyn (yellow card) 90+4'	Report	Tekiela (yellow card) 49'; Cabral (yellow card) 58'; Kallman (yellow card) 71'	Stadium: Stadium at Expo Idaho; Attendance: 7,247; Referee: Calin Radosav

July 1, 2026 16	Union Omaha	3–1	AV Alta FC	Omaha, NE
8:30 CDT	Lawrence (yellow card) 52'; Kallman (yellow card) 57'; Pato 74'; Cabral 81'; Gómez 87'	Report	Aoumaich 31'; Desdunes (yellow card) 80'	Stadium: Morrison Stadium; Attendance: 2,724; Referee: Matthew Corrigan

July 18, 2026 17	Union Omaha	2–2	Westchester SC	Omaha, NE
6:00 CDT	Ors 9', 80'; Pato (yellow card) 63'; Guediri (yellow card) 82'	Report	Pierre (yellow card) 29'; Bouman 34', (yellow card) 65'; Guezen 52'; McGlynn (yellow card) 56'; Burko (yellow card) 73'; Marinelli (yellow card) 90+4'	Stadium: Morrison Stadium; Attendance: 2,275; Referee: Emmy Nonso-Ayakwo

July 22, 2026 18	Portland Hearts of Pine	1–2	Union Omaha	Portland, ME
6:00 CDT	Gonzalez 9'; Lopez (yellow card) 39'; Wright (yellow card) 45+7'; Barbosa (yellow card) 75'	Report	Gutierrez 16'; Cabral 32'; Owusu (yellow card) 40'; Guediri (yellow card) 55'; Wootton (yellow card) 84'	Stadium: Fitzpatrick Stadium; Attendance: 6,239; Referee: Deny Kulasinac

August 1, 2026 19	Fort Wayne FC	0–2	Union Omaha	Fort Wayne, IN
6:30 CDT	Dias (yellow card) 75'; Rempel (red card) 88'	Report	Gavilanes 61'; Malone (yellow card) 71'; Cabral (yellow card) 71'; Ors 74'; Vargas (yellow card) 90+5'	Stadium: Fort Wayne FC Park; Attendance: 3,801; Referee: Jorge Escobar

August 6, 2026 20	Chattanooga Red Wolves	1–3	Union Omaha	East Ridge, TN
6:00 CDT	Hernandez (red card); Ramos 52', (yellow card) 71'; Lelin (yellow card) 62'; Kelly-Rosales (yellow card) 81'	Report	Ors 3'; Guediri (yellow card) 35'; Gavilanes 50'; Gómez 83'	Stadium: CHI Memorial Stadium; Attendance: 1,070; Referee: Stephen Foster

August 16, 2026 21	Union Omaha	5–1	Richmond Kickers	Omaha, NE
6:00 CDT	Ors 28'; Gómez 34'; Sean Vinberg 38' (o.g.); Owusu (yellow card) 39'; Vargas (yellow card) 41'; Gutierrez 67'; Cáceres (yellow card) 86'; Gavilanes 90'	Report	O'Malley (yellow card) 36'; Bolduc 43'	Stadium: Morrison Stadium; Attendance: 2,582; Referee: Braeden Frey

August 22, 2026 22	Union Omaha	v	Sarasota Paradise	Omaha, NE
				Stadium: Morrison Stadium

August 26, 2026 23	FC Naples	v	Union Omaha	Naples, FL
				Stadium: Paradise Coast Sports Complex

August 29, 2026 24	Union Omaha	v	New York Cosmos	Omaha, NE
				Stadium: Morrison Stadium

September 5, 2026 25	Union Omaha	v	Charlotte Independence	Omaha, NE
				Stadium: Morrison Stadium

September 12, 2026 26	Corpus Christi FC	v	Union Omaha	Corpus Christi, TX
				Stadium: Cabaniss Athletic Complex

September 16, 2026 27	Union Omaha	v	Spokane Velocity FC	Omaha, NE
				Stadium: Morrison Stadium

September 19, 2026 28	Union Omaha	v	One Knoxville SC	Omaha, NE
				Stadium: Morrison Stadium

September 26, 2026 29	Greenville, SC	v	Union Omaha

October 10, 2026 30	Union Omaha	v	Fort Wayne FC	Omaha, NE
				Stadium: Morrison Stadium

October 17, 2026 31	Westchester SC	v	Union Omaha	Mount Vernon, NY
				Stadium: The Stadium at Memorial Field

October 24, 2026 32	Forward Madison	v	Union Omaha	Madison, WI
				Stadium: Breese Stevens Field

=== Prinx Tires USL Cup ===
==== Table ====
Pos	Lg	Team	Pld	W	PKW	PKL	L	GF	GA	GD	Pts	Qualification
1	USLC	Louisville City FC	4	3	1	0	0	12	4	+8	11	Advance to knockout stage
2	USLC	Detroit City FC	4	2	0	2	0	4	2	+2	8	
3	USLC	Indy Eleven	4	1	2	0	1	5	4	+1	7	
4	USL1	Union Omaha	4	2	0	0	2	10	12	−2	6	
5	USLC	Lexington SC	4	1	1	1	1	7	7	0	6	
6	USL1	Forward Madison FC	4	1	0	0	3	6	10	−4	3	
7	USL1	Fort Wayne FC	4	0	0	1	3	6	11	−5	1	

==== Match results ====
April 25, 2026 1	Indy Eleven	1–2	Union Omaha	Indianapolis, IN
7:00 p.m.	Lindley (yellow card) 39'; Quinn (yellow card) 45+2'; Rendón 80'	Report	Cabral (yellow card) 39'; Pato 44'; Borczak 56'; Boudadi (yellow card) 64'	Stadium: Michael A. Carroll Stadium; Attendance: 8,552; Referee: Elvis Osmanovic

May 17, 2026 2	Union Omaha	1–5	Louisville City	Omaha, NE
5:00 p.m.	Diego 40' (pen.); Boudadi (red card); Orson (yellow card) 89'	Report	Wilson 27', 49'; Perez (yellow card) 35'; Showunmi (yellow card) 37'; McFadden (yellow card) 45+1'; Donovan 72', 83'; Huerman 87'	Stadium: Morrison Stadium; Attendance: 2,041; Referee: Trevor Wiseman

June 6, 2026 3	Union Omaha	4–2	Fort Wayne FC	Omaha, NE
8:00 p.m.	Pato 15'; Gavilanes 17'; Tekiela 66', 85', (yellow card) 66'	Report	Nieto (yellow card) 30'; Hernandez (yellow card) 34'; Oyetunde 41'; Becher 45'	Stadium: Morrison Stadium; Attendance: 2,348; Referee: Gerald Flores

July 11, 2026 4	Forward Madison	4–3	Union Omaha	Madison, WI
7:00 CDT	Bolma 31'; R. Carmichael 35', 63'; Segbers (yellow card) 41'; Flores (yellow card) 45+2'; Castro (yellow card) 77'; Karamoko 90+6', (yellow card) 90+7'	Report	Gómez 26'; Cáceres (yellow card) 36'; Boudadi (yellow card) 47'; Owusu (yellow card) 70'; Ors 79'; Gutierrez 83' (pen.); Wootton (yellow card) 90+2'	Stadium: Breese Stevens Field; Attendance: 3,573; Referee: Elton García

=== U.S. Open Cup ===
March 18, 2026 First Round	BOHFS of St. Louis (MWPL) (Missouri)	0–8	Union Omaha (USL1) (Nebraska)	St. Charles, MO
7:00 CDT	Schrum (yellow card) 45'	Report	Cabral 11'; Guediri 21'; Borczak 34'; Owusu 49', 90'; Ors 72', 74'; Pato 81'	Stadium: Harlen C. Hunter Stadium; Attendance: 2,100; Referee: Anthony Sobolevsky

March 31, 2026 Second Round	Indy Eleven (USLC) (Indiana)	1–2	Union Omaha (USL1) (Nebraska)	Indianapolis, IN
6:00 CDT	Charles-Cook (red card) 59'; Blake 90+3'	Report	Kallman (yellow card) 50'; Owusu 75'; Tekiela 83'	Stadium: Michael A. Carroll Stadium; Attendance: 3,469; Referee: John Griggs

April 14, 2026 Round of 32	Colorado Rapids (MLS)	1–0	Union Omaha (USL1) (Nebraska)	Commerce City, CO
8:30 CDT	Sealy 21', (yellow card) 47'; Rosenberry (yellow card) 65'; Defreitas-Hansen (yellow card) 90'	Report	Kallman (yellow card) 80'; Borczak (yellow card) 82'; Guediri (yellow card) 84'; Knapp (yellow card) 90'	Stadium: Dick's Sporting Goods Park; Referee: Alyssa Pennington

=== International Friendly ===
July 25, 2026	Union Omaha (USL1)	1-3	FC Juarez (Liga MX)	Omaha, NE
6:00 CDT	Klein 49'	Report	Galvan 23' Galvan 67' Cota 89'	Stadium: Morrison Stadium; Referee: Jacob Larson

== Statistics ==
=== Appearances and goals ===
Numbers after plus–sign (+) denote appearances as a substitute.

No.	Pos	Nat	Player	Total		USL-1		U.S. Open Cup		USL Cup	
No.	Pos	Nat	Player	Apps	Goals	Apps	Goals	Apps	Goals	Apps	Goals
3	DF	(United States) USA	Blake Malone	14	0	4+7	0	0+0	0	2+1	0
4	DF	(Ghana) GHA	Samuel Owusu	28	5	20+1	2	3+0	3	3+1	0
5	DF	(England) ENG	Jamie Orson	4	0	1+1	0	0+0	0	1+1	0
6	DF	(Algeria) ALG	Sami Guediri	20	1	14+2	0	1+1	1	2+0	0
7	MF	(Germany) GER	Adrian Billhardt	10	1	3+5	1	2+0	0	0+0	0
8	MF	(Brazil) BRA	Gabriel Cabral	24	3	15+3	2	3+0	1	3+0	0
9	FW	(Mexico) MEX	Pato Botello Faz	28	6	17+4	3	1+2	1	3+1	2
11	FW	(United States) USA	Dylan Borczak	16	2	7+4	0	2+0	1	3+0	1
12	MF	(United States) USA	Marlon Vargas	6	0	2+2	0	0+0	0	1+1	0
14	DF	(United States) USA	Brent Kallman	25	1	16+2	1	3+0	0	2+2	0
15	MF	(United States) USA	Brandon Knapp	9	1	6+0	1	1+1	0	1+0	0
16	MF	(England) ENG	Laurence Wootton	27	0	15+5	0	2+1	0	1+3	0
17	FW	(United States) USA	Diego Gutierrez	27	9	10+10	7	2+1	0	2+2	2
19	DF	(United States) USA	Camron Lawrence	20	0	7+8	0	2+0	0	2+1	0
20	FW	(Spain) ESP	Sergio Ors Navarro	20	10	11+4	7	1+1	2	2+1	1
21	FW	(Mexico) MEX	Aarón Gómez	22	5	8+10	4	0+0	0	3+1	1
22	MF	(Germany) GER	Kempes Tekiela	23	7	11+5	4	3+0	1	1+3	2
23	DF	(Morocco) MAR	Younes Boudadi	26	0	17+3	0	1+2	0	3+0	0
24	GK	(Ghana) GHA	Rashid Nuhu	13	0	10+0	0	1+0	0	2+0	0
27	DF	(South Sudan) SSD	Ryen Jiba	25	1	11+8	1	2+1	0	3+0	0
28	MF	(United States) USA	Edrey Cáceres	17	0	6+9	0	1+0	0	1+0	0
77	MF	(United States) USA	Allen Gavilanes	15	5	8+4	4	0+0	0	2+1	1
99	GK	(United States) USA	Cole Jensen	15	0	11+0	0	2+0	0	2+0	0

- Last updated: August 18, 2026
- Source: USL League One

=== Disciplinary record ===
No.	Pos.	Player	USL1			US Open Cup			USL Cup			Total		
No.	Pos.	Player	Yellow card	(yellow card) (yellow-red card)	Red card	Yellow card	(yellow card) (yellow-red card)	Red card	Yellow card	(yellow card) (yellow-red card)	Red card	Yellow card	(yellow card) (yellow-red card)	Red card
3	DF	(United States) Blake Malone	2	0	0	0	0	0	0	0	0	2	0	0
4	DF	(Ghana) Samuel Owusu	4	0	0	0	0	0	1	0	0	5	0	0
5	DF	(United States) Jamie Orson	0	0	1	0	0	0	1	0	0	1	0	1
6	DF	(Algeria) Sami Guediri	5	0	0	1	0	0	0	0	0	6	0	0
7	MF	(Germany) Adrian Billhardt	0	0	0	0	0	0	0	0	0	0	0	0
8	FW	(Brazil) Gabriel Cabral	4	0	0	0	0	0	1	0	0	5	0	0
9	FW	(Spain) Pato Botello Faz	3	0	0	0	0	0	0	0	0	3	0	0
11	FW	(United States) Dylan Borczak	1	0	0	1	0	0	0	0	0	2	0	0
12	MF	(United States) Marlon Vargas	2	0	0	0	0	0	0	0	0	2	0	0
14	DF	(United States) Brent Kallman	3	0	0	2	0	0	0	0	0	5	0	0
15	MF	(United States) Brandon Knapp	1	0	0	1	0	0	0	0	0	2	0	0
16	MF	(England) Laurence Wootton	4	0	0	0	0	0	1	0	0	5	0	0
17	FW	(United States) Diego Gutierrez	0	0	0	0	0	0	0	0	0	0	0	0
19	DF	(United States) Camron Lawrence	1	0	0	0	0	0	0	0	0	1	0	0
20	DF	(Spain) Sergio Ors Navarro	2	0	0	0	0	0	0	0	0	2	0	0
21	FW	(Mexico) Aarón Gómez	1	0	0	0	0	0	0	0	0	1	0	0
22	FW	(Germany) Kempes Tekiela	1	0	0	0	0	0	1	0	0	2	0	0
23	MF	(Morocco) Younes Boudadi	1	0	0	0	0	0	2	0	1	3	0	1
24	GK	(Ghana) Rashid Nuhu	1	0	0	0	0	0	0	0	0	1	0	0
27	DF	(South Sudan) Ryen Jiba	0	0	0	0	0	0	0	0	0	0	0	0
28	MF	(United States) Edrey Cáceres	3	0	0	0	0	0	1	0	0	4	0	0
77	MF	(United States) Allen Gavilanes	0	0	0	0	0	0	0	0	0	0	0	0
99	GK	(United States) Cole Jensen	1	0	0	0	0	0	0	0	0	1	0	0
Total			40	0	1	5	0	0	8	0	1	53	0	2

- Last updated: August 18, 2026
- Source: USL League One
