= 2025 Union Omaha season =

Union Omaha
2025 season
- Owner: Gary Green
- Head coach: Dominic Casciato (until July 8); Vincenzo Candela (interim, from July 9)
- Stadium: Werner Park
- USL League One: 5th
- USL1 Playoffs: Quarterfinal
- U.S. Open Cup: 3rd Round
- USL Cup: Group Stage
- Top goalscorer: League: Sergio Ors Navaro (10 goals); All: Sergio Ors Navaro (11 goals)
- Highest home attendance: 4,429 (10/1 v. POR)
- Lowest home attendance: 1,499 (9/17 v. SPK
- Average home league attendance: 3,043
- Biggest win: 5 goals (9/6 v. TXO)
- Biggest defeat: 3 goals (3/12 @ GVL)

The 2025 Union Omaha season was the sixth season in the soccer team's history, all of which have been in USL League One in the third division of American soccer. Union Omaha played their home games at Werner Park, located in Papillion, Nebraska, United States.

They entered the season as the reigning title holders of both the USL League One Players' Shield and the USL League One Cup, having beaten Spokane Velocity in the previous year's final. Union Omaha also competed in the USL Cup (known as the USL Jägermeister Cup for sponsorship reasons) and the U.S. Open Cup.

On July 8, longtime manager Dominic Casciato left the club to become the manager of the Tampa Bay Rowdies. He was replaced on an interim basis by assistant Vincenzo Candela.

== Transfers ==
=== Transfers in ===
Date	Position	Name	From	Fee/notes	Ref.
January 8, 2025	MF	(Germany) Max Schneider	(United States) Indy Eleven		
January 10, 2025	MF	(France) Kemy Amiche	(France) US Thionville Lusitanos		
January 28, 2025	FW	(France) Mehdi Ouamri	(United States) Chattanooga FC		
February 14, 2025	DF	(United States) Brent Kallman	(United States) Nashville SC		
February 28, 2025	GK	(United States) Russell Shealy	(United States) Northern Colorado Hailstorm		
March 6, 2025	MF	(United States) Isidro Martinez	(United States) Northern Colorado Hailstorm		
March 7, 2025	FW	(Ghana) Prosper Kasim	(United States) Birmingham Legion		
March 12, 2025	GK	(United States) Cole Jensen	(United States) Inter Miami CF II		
March 18, 2025	FW	(Spain) Sergio Ors Navarro	(United States) West Virginia Mountaineers		
March 28, 2025	DF	(Ghana) Samuel Owusu	(United States) New York City FC II		
April 15, 2025	MF	(England) Laurence Wootton	(United States) Chicago Fire		
June 6, 2025	FW	(Mexico) Pato Botello Faz	Unattached		
July 18, 2025	FW	(Brazil) Stefano Pinho	(Brazil) Aparecidense		

=== Loans in ===
No.	Pos.	Player	Loaned from	Start	End	Source
	DF	(United States) Josh Ramsey	(United States) Lexington SC	February 26, 2025	July 10, 2025	
	MF	(United States) Ryan Becher	(United States) St. Louis City SC 2	June 18, 2025		
	FW	(United States) Benjamin Barjolo	(United States) Orange County SC	August 7, 2025		

=== Transfers out ===
Date	Position	No.	Name	To	Fee/notes	Ref.
January 1, 2025	DF	3	(Italy) Luca Mastrantonio	(United States) AV Alta FC		
January 22, 2025	GK	36	(United States) Wallis Lapsley	(United States) Forward Madison FC		
February 3, 2025	MF	9	(Brazil) Pedro Dolabella	(United States) North Carolina FC		
March 6, 2025	MF	22	(United States) Will Perkins	(United States) Texoma FC		
June 17, 2025	FW		(France) Kemy Amiche		Released	
June 17, 2025	FW		(France) Mehdi Ouamri		Released	
June 17, 2025	GK		(United States) Russell Shealy		Released	

== Roster ==
As of October 7, 2025

=== Current roster ===
No.	Pos.	Nation	Player
3	DF	USA	Blake Malone
4	DF	GHA	Samuel Owusu
5	DF	ITA	Marco Milanese
7	MF	USA	Joe Gallardo
8	FW	ESP	Sergio Ors Navarro
10	FW	GHA	Prosper Kasim
13	DF	USA	Anderson Holt
14	DF	USA	Brent Kallman
15	MF	USA	Brandon Knapp
16	MF	ENG	Laurence Wootton
17	DF	USA	Benjamin Barjolo
18	FW	USA	Mark Bronnik
20	DF	USA	Charlie Ostrem
21	FW	MEX	Aarón Gómez
23	MF	GER	Max Schneider
24	GK	GHA	Rashid Nuhu
26	DF	USA	Dion Acoff
27	DF	SSD	Ryen Jiba
28	DF	USA	Ryan Becher
29	DF	BRA	Stefano Pinho
30	MF	USA	Isidro Martinez
36	GK	USA	Cole Jensen
33	FW	MEX	Pato Botello Faz
70	FW	ANG	Lagos Kunga

1. On loan from Orange County SC
2. On loan from St. Louis City SC 2

== Competitions ==
=== Exhibitions ===
February 8, 2025 1	Sporting KC II	0–2	Union Omaha	Kansas City, MO
		Report		Stadium: Swope Soccer Village

February 15, 2025 2	Colorado Springs Switchbacks	2–2	Union Omaha	Colorado Springs, CO
TBD				Stadium: Weidner Field

February 21, 2025 3	Minnesota United FC 2	2–6	Union Omaha

February 27, 2025 4	FC Tulsa	4–4	Union Omaha	Tulsa, OK
2:00 pm CST				Stadium: Titan Sports and Performance Center
Note: Cumulative score of one 90-minute session and one 45-minute session; Union Omaha won the first session 2–4, FC Tulsa won the second session 2–0

March 5, 2025 5	Creighton Bluejays	v	Union Omaha

March 5, 2025 6	Iowa Western Reivers	v	Union Omaha

=== Regular season ===
==== Standings ====
Pos	Team	Pld	W	L	T	GF	GA	GD	Pts	Qualification
3	Spokane Velocity FC	30	14	7	9	41	35	+6	51	Playoffs
4	FC Naples	30	13	9	8	40	32	+8	47	Playoffs
5	Union Omaha	30	13	10	7	51	39	+12	46	Playoffs
6	South Georgia Tormenta FC	30	13	11	6	55	47	+8	45 (Note: South Georgia is ahead of Portland on total wins, South Georgia 13, Portland 11)	Playoffs
7	Portland Hearts of Pine	30	11	7	12	48	38	+10	45	Playoffs

Source: USL League One
Rules for classification: 1) points; 2) total wins; 3) total goal differential; 4) total goals scored; 5) points earned against top four finishers; 6) disciplinary points; 7) drawing of lots.

==== Results by round ====
Round	1	2	3	4	5	6	7	8	9	10	11	12	13	14	15	16	17	18	19	20	21	22	23	24	25	26	27	28	29	30
Stadium	A	A	A	A	H	A	A	A	H	A	H	A	A	H	A	H	H	A	H	H	H	A	H	H	A	H	H	A	H	H
Result	L	W	L	D	D	L	L	W	W	L	L	L	W	L	L	W	D	L	W	W	W	W	D	D	W	W	W	D	W	D
Position	14	8	10	12	11	13	14	11	8	9	11	11	11	12	14	10	10	12	9	8	8	8	6	7	6	6	5	5	4	5

Source: USL League One
A = Away; H = Home; W = Win; D = Draw; L = Loss

==== Match results ====
March 12, 2025 1	Greenville Triumph	3–0	Union Omaha	Greenville, SC
6:00 pm CDT	Castro 36', 47' (yellow card) 67'; Zakowski 45'; Polak (yellow card) 45+5'; Bubb (yellow card) 82'; Patti (yellow card) 84'	Report	Ouamri (yellow card) 45+4'; Malone (yellow card) 73'	Stadium: Paladin Stadium; Attendance: 1,655; Referee: John Matto

March 29, 2025 2	South Georgia Tormenta	1–3	Union Omaha	Statesboro, GA
6:00 pm CDT	Dery (yellow card) 17'; Owusu 40' (o.g.); Bazini (yellow card) 66'; Prepeliță (red card) 87'	Report	Gómez (yellow card) 13'; Milanese (yellow card) 26'; Ors Navarro 34'; Acoff 55'; Schneider 64'; Martinez (yellow card) 90+5'	Stadium: Tormenta Stadium; Attendance: 797; Referee: Edson Carvajal

April 9, 2025 3	Richmond Kickers	1−0	Union Omaha	Richmond, VA
5:00 pm CDT	França (yellow card) 58'; Espinal 82'; Anderson (yellow card) 87'; Vaughan (yellow card) 88'	Report	Kallman (yellow card) 11'; Bronnik (yellow card) 78'	Stadium: City Stadium; Attendance: 2,827; Referee: Ryan Homik

May 3, 2025 4	Forward Madison	0–0	Union Omaha	Madison, WI
5:00 pm CDT	Gebhard (yellow card) 37'; Murphy Jr. (yellow card) 54'; Carrera-García (yellow card) 58'; Brown (yellow card) 80'	Report	Knapp (yellow card) 57'	Stadium: Breese Stevens Field; Attendance: 3,482; Referee: Atahan Yaya

May 10, 2025 5	Union Omaha	2–2	Portland Hearts of Pine	Papillion, NE
7:00 pm CDT	Milanese (yellow card) 35'; Owusu 54'; Ostrem (yellow card) 69'; Kallman (yellow card) 73'; Gallardo 83' (pen.)	Report	Liadi 45+2'; Messer (yellow card) 48'; S. Wright (yellow card) 71'; Washington (yellow card) 74'; James 86'; Quiñones (yellow card) 87'; Reilly (yellow card) 90+3'	Stadium: Werner Park; Attendance: 3,346; Referee: Drew Klemp

May 17, 2025 6	Texoma FC	2–1	Union Omaha	Sherman, TX
9:00 pm CDT	Spengler (yellow card) 2', (goal) 84'; Asante 26'; Kilwien (yellow card) 34'; Jordan II (yellow card) 66'	Report	Schneider (yellow card) 2'; Kilwien 87' (o.g.)	Stadium: Historic Bearcat Stadium; Attendance: 679; Referee: Reyes Vargas

May 25, 2025 7	FC Naples	3–1	Union Omaha	Naples, FL
6:30 pm CDT	Ferrín 20' (pen.); Cisneros (yellow card) 23'; Cerro 45+3'; Onen 49'; O'Connor (yellow card) 69'	Report	Milanese (yellow card) 19'; Gallardo 32' (pen.); Ouamri (yellow card) 56'	Stadium: Paradise Coast Sports Complex; Attendance: 3,907; Referee: Rodrigo Albuquerque

June 7, 2025 8	Forward Madison	0–1	Union Omaha	Madison, WI
7:00 pm CDT	Murphy Jr. (yellow card) 79'; Sousa (yellow card) 85' (yellow-red card) 89'	Report	Martinez 14'; Owusu (yellow card) 48'; Acoff (yellow card) 53'	Stadium: Breese Stevens Field; Attendance: 4,207; Referee: Muhammad Kaleia

June 12, 2025 9	Union Omaha	1–0	Greenville Triumph	Papillion, NE
7:00 pm CDT	Milanese (yellow card) 24' (yellow-red card) 59'; Ors 40', (yellow card) 70'	Report	Fricke (yellow card) 28'; Sims (yellow card) 77'; Herrera (yellow card) 90+3'	Stadium: Werner Park; Attendance: 4,017; Referee: John Griggs

June 15, 2025 10	Portland Hearts of Pine	3–1	Union Omaha	Portland, ME
5:00 CDT	O. Wright 48', 73', 80', (yellow card) 80'; Lopez (yellow card) 50'; Vinberg (yellow card) 58'; Liadi (yellow card) 67'	Report	Holt (yellow card) 25'; Acoff 37'; Schneider (yellow card) 57'	Stadium: Fitzpatrick Stadium; Attendance: 5,703; Referee: Stephen Foster

June 25, 2025 11	Union Omaha	3–4	Richmond Kickers	Papillion, NE
7:00 pm CDT	Pato (yellow card) 17', (goal) 21'; Schneider (yellow card) 52'; Gallardo 58' (pen.); Bronnik 84'	Report	Barnathan (yellow card) 8'; Billhardt 12'; Knapp 14' (o.g.); Cela (yellow card) 41'; Kirkland 44', 50'; França (yellow card) 45+3'; Sneddon (yellow card) 90+3'	Stadium: Werner Park; Attendance: 2,388; Referee: Edson Carvajal

July 5, 2025 12	AV Alta FC	2–1	Union Omaha	Lancaster, CA
10:00 pm CDT	Alassane (yellow card) 16'; Martinez 45+2'; Mastrantonio 50'	Report	Gallardo (yellow card) 14'; Becher (yellow card) 19' (goal) 27'; Schneider (yellow card) 76'	Stadium: Lancaster Municipal Stadium; Attendance: 4,062; Referee: Joe Surgan

July 12, 2025 13	Charlotte Independence	1–2	Union Omaha	Charlotte, NC
8:15 pm CDT	Ndiaye (yellow card) 28'; Ousmanou (yellow card) 81'; Romero (yellow card) 86'; Spielman (yellow card) 88'; Marou 90+2'	Report	Becher 32'; Ors 65'	Stadium: American Legion Stadium; Attendance: 650; Referee: Berna Rico

July 18, 2025 14	Union Omaha	1–2	South Georgia Tormenta	Papillion, NE
6:00 pm CDT	Becher 13'; Schneider (yellow card) 83'	Report	Bazini 9', 19'; Walker (yellow card) 38'	Stadium: Werner Park; Attendance: 3,252; Referee: Greg Dopka

August 2, 2025 15	Spokane Velocity	2–1	Union Omaha	Spokane, WA
9:00 pm CDT	Vinyals 6'; John-Brown (yellow card) 29'; Peláez 45+3'; Garcia (yellow card) 52'	Report	Kallman (yellow card) 5'; Schneider (yellow card) 42'; Ostrem (yellow card) 58'; Ors (yellow card) 62'; Gallardo 84' (pen.)	Stadium: ONE Spokane Stadium; Attendance: 1,680; Referee: Ivan de Cristofaro

August 6, 2025 16	Union Omaha	2–1	Westchester SC	Papillion, NE
7:00 pm CDT	Becher 83'; Schneider (yellow card) 90+5'; Okiyoshi 90+6' (o.g.)	Report	Palma (yellow card) 36'; Saydee 52'; Pierre (yellow card) 90+2'	Stadium: Werner Park; Attendance: 2,021; Referee: Alex Beehler

August 9, 2025 17	Union Omaha	2–2	Chattanooga Red Wolves	Papillion, NE
7:00 pm CDT	Milanese (yellow card) 17'; Bronnik 27'; Pato (yellow card) 53'; Schneider (yellow card) 70'; Pinho 90+5'	Report	Ayimbila 35' (yellow card) 38'; Watters (yellow card) 45+4'; Lelin 84'; Gómez (yellow card) 90+2'	Stadium: Werner Park; Attendance: 4,182; Referee: Velimir Stefanovic

August 16, 2025 18	One Knoxville SC	1–0	Union Omaha	Knoxville, TN
6:00 pm CDT	Diene (yellow card) 58' (goal) 67'	Report	Kallman (yellow card) 21'; Milanese (yellow card) 38'; Schneider (yellow card) 51'; Pinho (yellow card) 66'	Stadium: Covenant Health Park; Attendance: 2,215; Referee: Alexandra Billeter

August 20, 2025 19	Union Omaha	4–1	Charlotte Independence	Papillion, NE
7:00 pm CDT	Becher 5', 32'; Bronnik 49', 54'; Ostrem (yellow card) 56'	Report	Romero (yellow card) 19'; Chaney (yellow card) 27'; Marou 75'; Sorenson (yellow card) 81'; Spielman (yellow card) 90+1'; Mbuyu (yellow card) 90+3'	Stadium: Werner Park; Attendance: 2,023; Referee: William Hale

August 23, 2025 20	Union Omaha	2–0	AV Alta FC	Papillion, NE
7:00 pm CDT	Kasim 27'; Jiba 78'	Report	Pajaro (yellow card) 52'; Blancas (yellow card) 82'	Stadium: Werner Park; Attendance: 3,704; Referee: Rodrigo Albuquerque

September 6, 2025 21	Union Omaha	5–0	Texoma FC	Papillion, NE
2:00 pm CDT	Schneider 7' (yellow card) 48'; Bronnik 13'; Pato 49'; Milanese (yellow card) 82'; Barjolo 84'; Pinho 87'	Report	Chavez (yellow card) 16'; Jordan II (yellow card) 32'	Stadium: Werner Park; Attendance: 3,089; Referee: Carlos Rodriguez

September 13, 2025 22	Westchester SC	1–2	Union Omaha	Mount Vernon, NY
6:00 pm CDT	Obregón 9'; Bolanos (yellow card) 32'; Payne (yellow card) 77'; McGlynn (yellow card) 82'	Report	Pato 15' (yellow card) 90+3' (yellow-red card) 90+3'; Knapp (yellow card) 36'; Bronnik 45+3'; Becher (yellow card) 70'; Schneider (yellow card) 80'	Stadium: The Stadium at Memorial Field; Attendance: 1,381; Referee: Russell Miller

September 17, 2025 23	Union Omaha	2–2	Spokane Velocity	Papillion, NE
7:00 pm CDT	Schneider (yellow card) 40'; Ors 88', 90+1'	Report	Brett 2'; Jome (yellow card) 32'; Opara (yellow card) 57'; Meredith (yellow card) 62'; John-Brown 76'	Stadium: Werner Park; Attendance: 1,499; Referee: Joe Surga

September 21, 2025 24	Union Omaha	2–2	One Knoxville SC	Papillion, NE
4:00 pm CDT	Ors 6', 15'; Schneider (yellow card) 21'; Knapp (yellow card) 63'; Wootton (yellow card) 79'	Report	Gøling (yellow card) 28'; Diene 36' (pen.), 71'; Johnson (yellow card) 39'; Ritchie (yellow card) 41'; Haugli (yellow card) 49'	Stadium: Werner Park; Attendance: 2,534; Referee: Benjamin Meyer

September 27, 2025 25	Chattanooga Red Wolves	0–3	Union Omaha	East Ridge, TN
6:00 pm CDT	Lelin (yellow card) 21'; Kinzner (yellow card) 51'; Watters (yellow card) 71'; Lombardi (yellow card) 88'	Report	Green 14' (o.g.); Ors 32'; Kasim 35'; Ostrem (yellow card) 37'; Wootton (yellow card) 80'	Stadium: CHI Memorial Stadium; Attendance: 2,061; Referee: Lauren Aldrich

October 1, 2025 26	Union Omaha	1–0	Portland Hearts of Pine	Papillion, NE
12:00 pm CDT	Ostrem (yellow card) 34'; Kasim 47'; Wootton (yellow card) 52'; Becher (yellow card) 90+3'	Report	Vinberg (yellow card) 25'; Kamara (yellow card) 90+5'	Stadium: Werner Park; Attendance: 4,429; Referee: Danielle Chesky

October 5, 2025 27	Union Omaha	2–1	FC Naples	Papillion, NE
4:00 pm CDT	Kallman (yellow card) 34'; Kasim 57'; Pinho 64'; Acoff (yellow card) 75'	Report	Henderlong (yellow card) 6'; Torrellas (yellow card) 77'; Bachstein 80'; Dengler (yellow card) 82'; Onen (yellow card) 89'	Stadium: Werner Park; Attendance: 2,285; Referee: Alex Beehler

October 11, 2025 28	Greenville Triumph	0–0	Union Omaha	Greenville, SC
1:00 pm CDT	Robles (yellow card) 56'; Soto (yellow card) 73'; Fricke (yellow card) 76'	Report	Kasim (yellow card) 31'; Knapp (yellow card) 60'; Owusu (yellow card) 74'	Stadium: Paladin Stadium; Attendance: 1,939; Referee: Drew Klemp

October 18, 2025 29	Union Omaha	4–0	Forward Madison	Papillion, NE
6:00 pm CDT	Kasim (yellow card) 13'; Ors 45+2', 79'; Milanese (yellow card) 45+3'; Becher 57'; Schneider (yellow card) 80'; Jiba 90+3'	Report	Ramos (yellow card) 54'; Murphy Jr. (yellow card) 60'	Stadium: Werner Park; Attendance: 3,264; Referee: Dion Coxe-Trieger

October 25, 2025 30	Union Omaha	2–2	Spokane Velocity	Papillion, NE
6:00 pm CDT	Schneider (yellow card) 25', (goal) 41'; Becher 30'; Acoff (yellow card) 36'; Kallman (yellow card) 88'	Report	Hernández 5'; Reedy (yellow card) 32'; Peláez 80'; L. Gil (yellow card) 90'	Stadium: Werner Park; Attendance: 3,607; Referee: Muhammad Hassan

=== USL League One playoffs ===
November 1, 2025 Quarter-Final	FC Naples	0–0 (a.e.t.) (4–3 p)	Union Omaha	Naples, FL
6:30 PM CST	Henderlong (yellow card) 45+1'; Ferrin (yellow card) 49'; O'Connor (yellow card) 76'; Cisneros (yellow card) 107'	Report	Acoff (yellow card) 90+4'; Kasim (yellow card) 99'	Stadium: Paradise Coast Sports Complex; Attendance: 3,636; Referee: Cristian Campo
	Penalties
	Prpa (penalty scored); Pasnik (penalty missed); Dengler (penalty scored); O'Connor (penalty missed); Onen (penalty scored); Garrett (penalty scored)		Ors (penalty scored); Jiba (penalty missed); Botello Faz (penalty scored); Ostrem (penalty missed); Martinez (penalty scored); Bronnik (penalty missed)

=== Table ===
Pos	Lg	Team	Pld	W	PKW	PKL	L	GF	GA	GD	Pts	Qualification
1	USLC	San Antonio FC	4	3	0	1	0	6	2	+4	10	Advance to knockout stage
2	USLC	New Mexico United	4	1	2	1	0	9	7	+2	8	
3	USLC	Colorado Springs Switchbacks FC	4	2	0	1	1	7	4	+3	7	
4	USLC	Phoenix Rising FC	4	1	2	0	1	10	10	0	7	
5	USLC	El Paso Locomotive FC	4	1	1	1	1	3	3	0	6	
6	USL1	Union Omaha	4	1	0	0	3	3	5	−2	3	
7	USL1	Texoma FC	4	0	0	1	3	5	12	−7	1	

Updated to match(es) played on July 26, 2025. Source: USL

==== Match results ====
April 26, 2025 1	New Mexico United	2−0	Union Omaha	Albuquerque, NM
7:00 PM MDT	Maples 42' (pen.); Seymore (yellow card) 46'; Akale (yellow card) 86'; Vargas 90+3'	Report	Ouamri (yellow card) 6'; Schneider (yellow card) 15'; Kallman (yellow card) 25' (red card); Gómez (yellow card) 75'	Stadium: Isotopes Park; Attendance: 9,495; Referee: Brandon Stevis

June 28, 2025 2	San Antonio FC	1–0	Union Omaha	San Antonio, TX
8:00 pm CDT	LaCava 9'; Berrón (yellow card) 28'; N. Hernandez (yellow card) 56'	Report	Schneider (yellow card) 44'; Ostrem (yellow card) 51'; Bronnik (yellow card) 60'; Owusu (yellow card) 69'; Pato (yellow card) 71'; Gallardo (yellow card) 83'; Milanese (yellow card) 90+5'	Stadium: Toyota Field; Attendance: 6,183; Referee: Cristian Campo

July 23, 2025 3	Union Omaha	3–1	Texoma FC	Papillion, NE
7:00 pm CDT	Pato 20'; Kallman (yellow card) 44'; Becher 44'; Ors 51'; Holt (yellow card) 70'; Ostrem (yellow card) 72'; Knapp (yellow card) 90+2'	Report	Chavez (yellow card) 18' (yellow-red card) 28'; Holt 35' (o.g.)	Stadium: Werner Park; Attendance: 1,849; Referee: Trevor Wiseman

July 26, 2025 4	Union Omaha	0–1	El Paso Locomotive	Papillion, NE
7:00 pm CDT	Milanese (yellow card) 57'; Ostrem (yellow card) 77'	Report	Diaz (yellow card) 28'; Avila 39' (yellow card) 77'; Coronado (yellow card) 90+4'	Stadium: Werner Park; Attendance: 2,176; Referee: Amin Hadzic

=== U.S. Open Cup ===
March 21 First Round	Flatirons FC (USL2) (Colorado)	1–2	(Nebraska) Union Omaha (USL1)	Golden, CO
8:00 PM CDT	Hernandez (yellow card) 58'; Andrews 82'	Report	Gómez 28'; Martinez (yellow card) 60'; Gallardo 73' (pen.), (yellow card) 90+1'; Holt (yellow card) 83'	Stadium: Stermole Soccer Stadium; Attendance: 200; Referee: Lukasz Jozefecki

April 2 Second Round	Des Moines Menace (USL2) (Iowa)	1–2	(Nebraska) Union Omaha (USL1)	West Des Moines, IA
7:30 PM CDT	Feilhaber 55' (pen.); Kljestan (yellow card) 69' (yellow-red card) 69'	Report	Acoff 18'; Knapp (yellow card) 24' (yellow-red card) 54'; Gómez 33'; Schneider (yellow card) 35'; Milanese (yellow card) 42'	Stadium: Valley Stadium; Attendance: 1,000; Referee: Cristian Campo Hernández

April 15 Third Round	Union Omaha (USL1) (Nebraska)	1−0	(Texas) San Antonio FC (USLC)	Omaha, NE
7:00 PM CDT	Acoff 36'	Report		Stadium: Caniglia Field; Attendance: 1,112; Referee: Drew Klemp

May 7 Round of 32	St. Louis City SC (Missouri)	2–0	(Nebraska) Union Omaha	St. Louis, Missouri
7:00 p.m. CDT	Zalinsky 68'; Klauss 87'; Joyner (yellow card) 90+3'	Report	Knapp (yellow card) 45+3'; Gallardo (yellow card) 62'; Ostrem (yellow card) 90'	Stadium: Energizer Park; Attendance: 6,042; Referee: William Hale

== Statistics ==
=== Appearances and goals ===
Numbers after plus–sign (+) denote appearances as a substitute.

No.	Pos	Nat	Player	Total		USL-1		U.S. Open Cup		USL Cup	
No.	Pos	Nat	Player	Apps	Goals	Apps	Goals	Apps	Goals	Apps	Goals
3	DF	(United States) USA	Blake Malone	1	0	1+0	0	0+0	0	0+0	0
4	DF	(Ghana) GHA	Samuel Owusu	30	1	25+2	1	1+0	0	2+0	0
5	DF	(Italy) ITA	Marco Milanese	31	0	19+4	0	4+0	0	4+0	0
7	MF	(United States) USA	Joe Gallardo	27	5	6+14	4	4+0	1	2+1	0
8	FW	(Spain) ESP	Sergio Ors Navarro	34	11	15+12	10	1+2	0	2+2	1
9	FW	(France) FRA	Mehdi Ouamri	9	0	1+3	0	1+3	0	1+0	0
10	FW	(Ghana) GHA	Prosper Kasim	26	4	13+9	4	1+2	0	1+0	0
12	GK	(United States) USA	Russell Shealy	1	0	1+0	0	0+0	0	0+0	0
13	DF	(United States) USA	Anderson Holt	20	0	11+2	0	3+1	0	3+0	0
14	DF	(United States) USA	Brent Kallman	28	0	19+2	0	4+0	0	2+1	0
15	MF	(United States) USA	Brandon Knapp	36	0	25+4	0	2+1	0	2+2	0
16	MF	(England) ENG	Laurence Wootton	31	0	14+11	0	1+1	0	1+3	0
17	FW	(United States) USA	Benjamin Barjolo	5	1	0+5	1	0+0	0	0+0	0
18	FW	(United States) USA	Mark Bronnik	34	6	12+15	6	0+4	0	1+2	0
19	DF	(United States) USA	Josh Ramsey	0	0	0+0	0	0+0	0	0+0	0
20	DF	(United States) USA	Charlie Ostrem	37	0	29+0	0	4+0	0	3+1	0
21	FW	(Mexico) MEX	Aarón Gómez	13	2	8+0	0	4+0	2	1+0	0
23	MF	(Germany) GER	Max Schneider	34	3	27+0	3	4+0	0	3+0	0
24	GK	(Ghana) GHA	Rashid Nuhu	28	0	24+0	0	2+0	0	2+0	0
26	DF	(United States) USA	Dion Acoff	27	4	18+6	2	2+0	2	1+0	0
27	DF	(South Sudan) SSD	Ryen Jiba	18	2	3+13	2	0+1	0	1+0	0
28	MF	(United States) USA	Ryan Becher	21	9	13+5	8	0+0	0	3+0	1
29	FW	(Brazil) BRA	Stefano Pinho	19	3	9+8	3	0+0	0	2+0	0
30	MF	(United States) USA	Isidro Martinez	32	1	17+8	1	2+1	0	4+0	0
33	FW	(Mexico) MEX	Pato Botello Faz	23	4	14+6	3	0+0	0	1+2	1
36	GK	(United States) USA	Cole Jensen	9	0	5+0	0	2+0	0	2+0	0
70	FW	(United States) USA	Lagos Kunga	0	0	0+0	0	0+0	0	0+0	0
95	FW	(France) FRA	Kemy Amiche	9	0	1+5	0	2+0	0	0+1	0

- Last updated: October 26, 2025
- Source: USL League One

=== Disciplinary record ===
No.	Pos.	Player	USL1			US Open Cup			USL Cup			Total		
No.	Pos.	Player	Booked	(yellow card) (yellow-red card)	Sent off (straight red)	Booked	(yellow card) (yellow-red card)	Sent off (straight red)	Booked	(yellow card) (yellow-red card)	Sent off (straight red)	Booked	(yellow card) (yellow-red card)	Sent off (straight red)
3	DF	(United States) Blake Malone	1	0	0	0	0	0	0	0	0	1	0	0
4	DF	(Ghana) Samuel Owusu	2	0	0	0	0	0	1	0	0	3	0	0
5	DF	(Italy) Marco Milanese	7	1	0	1	0	0	2	0	0	10	1	0
7	MF	(United States) Joe Gallardo	1	0	0	2	0	0	1	0	0	4	0	0
8	FW	(Spain) Sergio Ors Navarro	2	0	0	0	0	0	0	0	0	2	0	0
9	FW	(France) Mehdi Ouamri	2	0	0	1	0	0	1	0	0	4	0	0
10	FW	(Ghana) Prosper Kasim	2	0	0	0	0	0	0	0	0	2	0	0
12	GK	(United States) Russell Shealy	0	0	0	0	0	0	0	0	0	0	0	0
13	DF	(United States) Anderson Holt	1	0	0	1	0	0	1	0	0	3	0	0
14	DF	(United States) Brent Kallman	7	0	0	1	0	0	2	0	1	10	0	1
15	MF	(United States) Brandon Knapp	4	0	0	2	0	1	1	0	0	7	0	1
16	MF	(England) Laurence Wootton	3	0	0	0	0	0	0	0	0	3	0	0
17	FW	(United States) Benjamin Barjolo	0	0	0	0	0	0	0	0	0	0	0	0
18	FW	(United States) Mark Bronnik	1	0	0	0	0	0	1	0	0	2	0	0
19	DF	(United States) Josh Ramsey	0	0	0	0	0	0	0	0	0	0	0	0
20	DF	(United States) Charlie Ostrem	5	0	0	1	0	0	3	0	0	9	0	0
21	FW	(Mexico) Aarón Gómez	1	0	0	0	0	0	1	0	0	2	0	0
23	MF	(Germany) Max Schneider	15	0	0	1	0	0	2	0	0	18	0	0
24	GK	(Ghana) Rashid Nuhu	0	0	0	1	0	0	0	0	0	1	0	0
26	DF	(United States) Dion Acoff	2	0	0	0	0	0	0	0	0	2	0	0
27	DF	(South Sudan) Ryen Jiba	0	0	0	0	0	0	0	0	0	0	0	0
28	MF	(United States) Ryan Becher	3	0	0	0	0	0	0	0	0	3	0	0
29	FW	(Brazil) Stefano Pinho	1	0	0	0	0	0	0	0	0	1	0	0
30	MF	(United States) Isidro Martinez	1	0	0	1	0	0	0	0	0	2	0	0
33	FW	(Mexico) Pato Botello Faz	1	1	0	0	0	0	1	0	0	2	1	0
36	GK	(United States) Cole Jensen	0	0	0	0	0	0	0	0	0	0	0	0
70	FW	(United States) Lagos Kunga	0	0	0	0	0	0	0	0	0	0	0	0
95	FW	(France) Kemy Amiche	0	0	0	0	0	0	0	0	0	0	0	0
Total			59	2	0	12	0	1	17	0	1	88	2	2

- Last updated: October 26, 2025
- Source: USL League One
