= 2026 Tampa Bay Rowdies season =

Tampa Bay Rowdies
2026 season
- Chairman: Patrick Zalupski
- Head coach: Dominic Casciato
- Stadium: Al Lang Stadium
- USL Championship: 1st, Eastern Conference
- USL Cup playoffs: 1st Round
- USL Cup: Quarterfinals
- Top goalscorer: League: MD Myers (13 goal); All: MD Myers (17 goal)
- Highest home attendance: 7,012
- Lowest home attendance: 4,038
- Average home league attendance: 5,131
- Biggest win: TBR 4–0 BIR (9/19) (USLC); MIA (USLC) 1–4 TBR (5/16) (USL Cup)
- Biggest defeat: TBR 1–4 LEX (7/4) (USLC)
Home colors	Away colors	Third colors

The 2026 Tampa Bay Rowdies season is the Tampa Bay Rowdies' seventeenth season of existence, their tenth in the United Soccer League, and eight in the USL Championship. Including the previous Tampa Bay Rowdies, this will be the 33nd season of a franchise in the Tampa Bay metro area with the Rowdies moniker. Including the now-defunct Tampa Bay Mutiny, this will be the 38th season of professional soccer in the Tampa Bay region.

Following the 2025 season, with both changes to the coaching staff and ownership, Tampa Bay started a reset by announcing their end of season roster decisions, only keeping eight players moving towards the 2026 season.

== Club ==
=== Roster ===
As of September 26, 2026

Squad No.	Name	Nationality	Position(s)	Since	Date of birth (age)	Signed from	Games played	Goals scored
Goalkeepers
1	Jahmali Waite	(Jamaica)	GK	2026	December 24, 1998 (age 27)	(United States) El Paso Locomotive FC	30	0
24	Austin Pack	(United States)	GK	2026	February 15, 1994 (age 32)	(United States) Tormenta FC	5	0
28	Owen Finnerty	(United States)	GK	2026	February 7, 2001 (age 25)	(United States) Forward Madison FC	0	0
35	Caleb Klepacz	(United States)	GK	2026	May 9, 2008 (age 18)	(United States) Tampa Bay Rowdies Academy	0	0
41	Joshua Kachurak	(United States)	GK	2026	December 6, 2006 (age 19)	(United States) Tampa Bay Rowdies Academy	0	0
Defenders
3	Brian Schaefer	(United States)	DF	2026	April 17, 2002 (age 24)	(United States) FC Cincinnati	21	0
5	Yanis Leerman	(France)	DF	2026	June 15, 1998 (age 28)	(United States) Loudoun United FC	9	0
20	Charlie Ostrem	(United States)	DF	2026	October 12, 1999 (age 27)	(United States) Union Omaha	35	1
21	Ethan Bartlow	(United States)	DF	2026	February 2, 2000 (age 26)	(United States) Sporting Kansas City	6	0
26	Dion Acoff	(United States)	DF	2026	September 23, 1991 (age 35)	(United States) Union Omaha	25	0
27	Laurence Wyke	(England)	DF	2025	September 20, 1996 (age 30)	(United States) Phoenix Rising FC	20	1
33	Gennaro Nigro	(United States)	DF	2026	May 29, 2000 (age 26)	(United States) Las Vegas Lights FC	8	0
36	Alex Rodriguez (Note: USL Academy Contract)	(United States)	DF	2026	age=19	(United States) Tampa Bay Rowdies Academy	7	0
37	Jesse Tita	(United States)	DF	2026	age=19	(United States) Tampa Bay Rowdies Academy	0	0
55	Leland Archer	(Trinidad and Tobago)	DF	2026	January 8, 1996 (age 30)	(United States) Charleston Battery	8	0
62	Nathan Dossantos	(Canada)	DF	2026	April 11, 1999 (age 27)	(United States) Charleston Battery	34	0
	Isaiah LeFlore	(United States)	DF	2026	December 11, 2002 (age 23)	(United States) Nashville SC	3	0
	Conner Antley	(United States)	DF	2026	March 22, 1995 (age 31)	(United States) D.C. United	4	1
Midfielders
4	Lewis Hilton	(England)	MF	2020	October 22, 1993 (age 33)	(United States) Saint Louis FC	25	0
8	Pedro Dolabella	(Brazil)	MF	2026	July 29, 1999 (age 27)	(United States) North Carolina FC	34	3
13	Louis Perez	(France)	MF	2026	July 11, 1997 (age 29)	(United States) North Carolina FC	29	5
16	Marco Micaletto	(Italy)	MF	2026	January 19, 1996 (age 30)	(United States) Colorado Springs Switchbacks FC	34	7
23	Max Schneider	(Germany)	MF	2026	July 28, 2000 (age 26)	(United States) Union Omaha	32	2
30	Sebastian Cruz	(United States)	MF	2026	July 31, 2000 (age 26)	(United States) AV Alta FC	27	4
	Mattheus Oliveira	(Brazil)	MF	2026	July 7, 1994 (age 32)	(United Arab Emirates) Al-Nasr SC	13	2
Forwards
7	Evan Conway	(United States)	FW	2026	November 7, 1997 (age 29)	(United States) North Carolina FC	28	4
9	MD Myers	(United States)	FW	2026	April 5, 2001 (age 25)	(United States) Charleston Battery	33	17
10	Russell Cicerone	(United States)	FW	2026	November 17, 1994 (age 31)	(United States) Sacramento Republic FC	28	6
11	Gino Vivi	(Costa Rica)	FW	2026	December 20, 2000 (age 25)	(United States) LA Galaxy	7	1
14	Karsen Henderlong	(United States)	FW	2026	September 24, 2000 (age 26)	(United States) FC Naples	23	5
19	Jürgen Locadia	(Curaçao)	FW	2026	November 7, 1993 (age 33)	(United States) Miami FC	2	0
	Endri Mustali	(United States)	CF	2024	June 7, 2007 (age 19)	(United States) Tampa Bay United SC	0	0

=== Team management and staff ===
Front Office
Owner	(United States) Patrick Zalupski
Co-chairman	(United States) Ken Babby
Co-chairman	(United States) Brian Auld
President	(United States) Ryan Helfrick
Head of Soccer Operations	(Argentina) Nico Castillo
Coaching Staff
Head Coach	(England) Dominic Casciato
Assistant Coach	(France) Yann Ekra
Assistant Coach	(United States) John Pascarella
Assistant Coach	(South Sudan) Ladule Lako LoSarah
Assistant Coach	(England) Andrew Fox
Goalkeeping Coach	(England) Stuart Dobson

== Non-competitive fixtures ==
=== Pre–season ===
Win	Draw	Loss

Date	Opponent	Venue	Location	Result	Scorer(s)
January 23	New York City FC	Al Lang Stadium	Tampa Bay, Florida	2–2	Dolabella 12'; Myers 14'
January 28	St. Louis City SC	Al Lang Stadium	Tampa Bay, Florida	2–2	Myers 35'; Álvarez 78'
February 7	Philadelphia Union	Al Lang Stadium	Tampa Bay, Florida	0-2	
February 14	CF Montréal	Al Lang Stadium	Tampa Bay, Florida	2–2	Henderlong 34'; Cicerone 71'(p)
February 18	FC Naples	Al Lang Stadium	Tampa Bay, Florida	3–0	Schneider 13'; Mendez 46'; Cruz 73'
February 21	USF	Al Lang Stadium	Tampa Bay, Florida		
February 21	Sarasota Paradise	Al Lang Stadium	Tampa Bay, Florida	1–0	Dolabella 65'
February 28	Sporting Club Jacksonville	Al Lang Stadium	Tampa Bay, Florida	1–0	Dolabella 45+4 (p)

== Competitive fixtures ==
=== USL Championship ===
==== Standings ====
Pos	Team	Pld	W	L	T	GF	GA	GD	Pts	Qualification
1	Tampa Bay Rowdies (S)	30	18	5	7	52	26	+26	61	Playoffs
2	Charleston Battery	30	16	9	5	56	35	+21	53	Playoffs
3	Detroit City FC	30	14	7	9	34	21	+13	51	Playoffs
4	Louisville City FC	30	13	9	8	51	43	+8	47	Playoffs
5	Pittsburgh Riverhounds SC	30	13	11	6	33	30	+3	45	Playoffs

Updated to match(es) played on October 24, 2026. Source: USL Championship Standings
Rules for classification: 1) total wins against conference opponents; 2) goal differential against conference opponents; 3) goals scored against conference opponents; 4) head-to-head points against conference opponents; 5) points per game against conference opponents; 6) points per game against non-conference opponents; 7) fewest disciplinary points; 8) coin toss or drawing of lots
(S) Players' Shield winner

==== Matches ====
On December 16, 2025, the USL Championship released the regular season schedule for all 25 teams.

Win	Draw	Loss

Matchday	Date	Opponent	Venue	Location	Result (Note: Tampa Bay Rowdies's score written first)	Scorers	Attendance	Referee	Position
1	March 7	Birmingham Legion FC	Protective Stadium	Birmingham, Alabama	1–0	Micaletto 57'	4,787	Brad Jensen	5th, Eastern Conf.
2	March 21	Pittsburgh Riverhounds SC	Al Lang Stadium	St. Petersburg, Florida	3–0	Cicerone 45+2; Myers 77'; Conway 90+4'	6,267	John Griggs	4th, Eastern Conf.
3	March 28	Loudoun United FC	Al Lang Stadium	St. Petersburg, Florida	3–1	Cruz 7' (o.g.) 52'; Myers 80'	6,088	Brandon Stevis	2nd, Eastern Conf.
4	April 4	Sporting Club Jacksonville	Hodges Stadium	Jacksonville, Florida	1–0	Conway 90+5'	1,982	Servando Berna Rico	2nd, Eastern Conf.
5	April 11	Oakland Roots SC	Al Lang Stadium	St. Petersburg, Florida	2–2	Micaletto 3'; Cicerone 45+2'	4,038	Abdou Ndiaye	2nd, Eastern Conf.
6	April 18	Charleston Battery	Patriots Point Soccer Complex	Mount Pleasant, South Carolina	1–1	Cruz 80'	3,856	Joshua Encarnación	2nd, Eastern Conf.
7	May 2	Indy Eleven	Al Lang Stadium	St. Petersburg, Florida	1–0	Oliveira 53'	4,821	Brandon Stevis	2nd, Eastern Conf
8	May 9	Rhode Island FC	Centreville Bank Stadium	Pawtucket, Rhode Island	1–1	Dolabella 29'	6,790	Rodrigo Albuquerque	2nd, Easter Conf
9	May 20	New Mexico United	Isotopes Park	Albuquerque, New Mexico	1–0	Perez 9'	6,187	Ekaterina Koroleva	1st Eastern Conf
10	May 23	Phoenix Rising FC	Al Lang Stadium	St. Petersburg, Florida	3–0	Dolabella 2'; Myers 28'; Perez 33'	5,776	Elton García	1st Eastern Conf
11	May 30	Louisville City FC	Lynn Family Stadium	Louisville, Kentucky	2–0	Myers 76'; Schneider 90+4'	10,108	Nabil Bensalah	1st, Estarn Conf
12	June 10	Charleston Battery	Al Lang Stadium	St. Petersburg, Florida	2–2	Perez 30'; Mattheus 90+1'	4,468	Elvis Osmanovic	1st, Eastern Conf.
13	June 13	Hartford Athletic	Al Lang Stadium	St. Petersburg, Florida	0–1		4,283	Brad Jensen	1st, Eastern Conf.
14	June 20	Brooklyn FC	Maimonides Park	Brooklyn, New York	2–0	Cicerone 29'; Myers 33' (p)	1,356	Serhii Boiko	1st, Eastern Conf.
15	July 4	Lexington SC	Al Lang Stadium	St. Petersburg, Florida	1–4	Vivi 78	4,997	Chris Penso	1st, Eastern Conf.
16	July 18	Loudoun United FC	Segra Field	Leesburg, Virginia	1–1	Dolabella 21' (p)	1,100	Deny Kulasinac	1st Easter Conf.
17	July 25	Miami FC	Pitbull Stadium	Miami-Dade County, Florida	3–2	Cicerone 10'; Myers 12'; Micaletto 80'	1,249	Matthew Thompson	1st Eastern Conf.
18	August 1	Louisville City FC	Al Lang Stadium	St. Petersburg, Florida	5–4	Cicerone 48', 86'; Micaletto 51'; Myers 54', 89'	5,859	Elton García	1st Eastern Conf.
19	August 8	Orange County SC	Championship Soccer Stadium	Irvine, California	3–0	Myers 24' (p); Micaletto 58'; Henderlong 89'	3,976	Brandon Stevis	1st Eastern Conf.
20	August 15	Rhode Island FC	Al Lang Stadium	St. Petersburg, Florida	2–0	Antley 61; Perez 90+2	49,47	Corbyn May	1st Eastern Conf
21	August 22	Detroit City FC	Keyworth Stadium	Hamtramck, Michigan	0–1		7,124	John Griggs	1st Eastern Conf.
22	August 29	Pittsburgh Riverhounds SC	Highmark Stadium	Pittsburgh, Pennsylvania	0–0		5,861	Elvis Osmanovic	1st Eastern Conf.
23	September 5	Brooklyn FC	Al Lang Stadium	St. Petersburg, Florida	2–0	Perez 24'; Conway 90+2'	4,537	Jeremy Scheer	1st Eastern Conf.
24	September 12	Hartford Athletic	Trinity Health Stadium	Hartford, Connecticut	1–3	Wyke 79'	3,908	Carlos Rodriguez	1st Eastern Conf.
25	September 19	Birmingham Legion FC	Al Lang Stadium	St. Petersburg, Florida	4–0	(o.g.) 30'; Myers 39', 56', 60'	5,440	Muhammad Hassan	1st Eastern Conf.
26	September 26	San Antonio FC	Toyota Field	San Antonio, Texas	0–0		5,848	Calin Radosav	1st Eastern Conf.
27	October 3	Miami FC	Al Lang Stadium	St. Petersburg, Florida	1–2	Ostrem 53'	7,012	Servando Berna Rico	1st Eastern Conf.
28	October 10	Indy Eleven	Carroll Soccer Stadium	Indianapolis, Indiana	3–1	Myers 73'; Cruz 85'; Micaletto 90+2'	9,627	Trevor Wiseman	1st Eastern Conf.
29	October 17	Detroit City FC	Al Lang Stadium	St. Petersburg, Florida	1–0	Cruz 88'	4,783	Erick Lezama	1st Eastern Conf.
30	October 24	Sporting Club Jacksonville	Al Lang Stadium	St. Petersburg, Florida	2–0	Henderlong 29; Micaletto 82'	5,179	Anthony Sobolevsky	1st Eastern Conf.

=== USL Championship playoffs ===
Win	Draw	Loss

Matchday	Date	Opponent	Venue	Location	Result (Note: Tampa Bay Rowdies's score written first)	Scorers	Attendance	Referee
Conference Quarterfinals	October 30	Miami FC	Al Lang Stadium	St. Petersburg, Florida	1-1 (4–5 p)	MD Myers 44'	5,448	Matthew Corrigan

=== USL Cup ===
On December 16, 2025, USL Championship announced the format for the third iteration of the USL Cup, that will feature all 43 teams from its league and USL League One. Of note is the match on April 25, 2025, which will be the first time Tampa Bay will face Sarasota Paradise of League One.

==== Standings ====
Pos	Lg	Team	Pld	W	PKW	PKL	L	GF	GA	GD	Pts	Qualification
1	USLC	Tampa Bay Rowdies	4	4	0	0	0	10	1	+9	12	Advance to knockout stage
2	USLC	Miami FC	4	3	0	0	1	11	5	+6	9	Advance to knockout stage (wild card)
3	USLC	Sporting Club Jacksonville	4	1	0	1	2	3	4	−1	4	
4	USL1	Sarasota Paradise	4	1	0	0	3	2	9	−7	3	
5	USL1	FC Naples	4	0	1	0	3	2	9	−7	2	

==== Results ====
Win	Draw	Loss

Matchday	Date	Opponent	Venue	Location	Result	Scorers	Attendance	Referee	Position
1	April 25	Sarasota Paradise (USL1)	Al Lang Stadium	St. Petersburg, Florida	2–0	Henderlong 31', 58'	5,669	Stefan Perri	1st, Group 7
2	May 16	Miami FC (USLC)	Pitbull Stadium	Miami-Dade County, Florida	4–1	Perez 12'; Myers 42', 47'; Schneider 68'	762	John Matto	1st, Group 7
3	June 6	Sporting Club Jacksonville (USLC)	Hodges Stadium	Jacksonville, Florida	2–0	Cruz 35'; Myers 45+2	869	Amin Hadzic	1st, Group 7
4	July 11	FC Naples (USL1)	Al Lang Stadium	St. Petersburg, Florida	2–0	Henderlong 41'; Conway 44'	4,928	Jorge Escobar	1st, Group 7
QF	August 13	Louisville City FC (USLC)	Al Lang Stadium	St. Petersburg, Florida	0-0; 3–5 (p)		2,287	Joshua Encarnación	N/A

=== U.S. Open Cup ===
On December 4, 2025, U.S. Soccer announced the format for the 2026 U.S. Open Cup. To prevent any scheduling conflict with the 2026 FIFA World Cup, the Open Cup was being reduced to 80 teams with seven rounds of play, rather than the eight rounds as it had in 2025. Because of this USL Championship was only given 17 slots based on 2025 standings. Tampa Bay did not qualify for one of those slots and will not partake in the competition this year.

== Statistics ==
=== Top scorers ===
Rank	Position	Number	Name	USLC	USLC playoffs	USL Cup	Total
1	FW	9	(United States) MD Myers	13	1	3	17
2	MF	16	(Italy) Marco Micaletto	7	0	0	7
3	FW	10	(United States) Russell Cicerone	6	0	0	6
3	MF	13	(France) Louis Perez	5	0	1	6
5	FW	14	(United States) Karsen Henderlong	1	0	3	5
6	FW	7	(United States) Evan Conway	3	0	1	4
6	MF	30	(United States) Sebastian Cruz	3	0	1	4
4	MF	8	(Brazil) Pedro Dolabella	3	0	0	3
9	MF	23	(Germany) Max Schneider	2	0	0	2
9	MF	17	(Brazil) Mattheus	2	0	0	2
11	FW	2	(United States) Conner Antley	1	0	0	1
11	FW	11	(Costa Rica) Gino Vivi	1	0	0	1
11	DF	20	(United States) Charlie Ostrem	1	0	0	1
11	DF	27	(England) Laurence Wyke	1	0	0	1
Total				45	1	10	56

- Last updated: October 30, 2026
- Source: USLC

=== Top assists ===
Rank	Position	Number	Name	USLC	USL Cup	Total
1	DF	20	(United States) Charlie Ostrem	8	2	10
2	FW	10	(United States) Russell Cicerone	5	0	5
3	MF	30	(United States) Sebastian Cruz	2	2	4
3	FW	9	(United States) MD Myers	4	0	4
3	MF	16	(Italy) Marco Micaletto	3	1	4
3	DF	26	(United States) Dion Acoff	3	1	4
7	FW	4	(England) Lewis Hilton	3	0	3
7	MF	8	(Brazil) Pedro Dolabella	2	1	3
7	MF	17	(Brazil) Mattheus	2	1	3
10	FW	7	(United States) Evan Conway	2	0	2
11	MF	13	(France) Louis Perez	1	0	1
11	MF	16	(United States) Karsen Henderlong	1	0	1
11	MF	23	(Germany) Max Schneider	1	0	1
11	DF	62	(Canada) Nathan Dossantos	1	0	1
Total				37	6	43

- Last updated: October 24, 2026
- Source: USLC

=== Disciplinary record ===
No.	Pos.	Player	USLC			USLC Playoffs			USL Cup			Total		
No.	Pos.	Player	Yellow card	(yellow card) (yellow-red card)	Red card	Yellow card	(yellow card) (yellow-red card)	Red card	Yellow card	(yellow card) (yellow-red card)	Red card			
1	GK	(Jamaica) Jahmali Waite	4	0	0	0	0	0	0	0	0	4	0	0
3	DF	(United States) Brian Schaefer	1	0	0	0	0	0	0	0	0	1	0	0
4	MF	(England) Lewis Hilton	4	0	0	1	0	0	0	0	0	5	0	0
5	DF	(France) Yanis Leerman	0	0	0	0	0	0	0	0	0	0	0	0
7	FW	(United States) Evan Conway	2	0	0	0	0	0	0	0	0	2	0	0
8	MF	(Brazil) Pedro Dolabella	3	0	0	2	0	0	1	0	0	6	0	0
9	FW	(United States) MD Myers	3	0	0	0	0	0	0	0	0	3	0	0
10	FW	(United States) Russell Cicerone	3	0	0	0	0	0	0	0	0	3	0	0
11	FW	(Costa Rica) Gino Vivi	1	0	0	0	0	0	0	0	0	1	0	0
13	MF	(France) Louis Perez	5	1	0	3	0	0	0	0	0	8	1	0
14	FW	(United States) Karsen Henderlong	0	0	0	1	0	0	0	0	0	1	0	0
16	MF	(Italy) Marco Micaletto	5	0	0	0	0	0	0	0	0	5	0	0
17	MF	(Brazil) Mattheus	0	0	0	1	0	0	0	0	0	1	0	0
19	DF	(United States) Isaiah LeFlore	0	1	0	0	0	0	0	0	0	0	1	0
20	DF	(Argentina) Charlie Ostrem	8	0	0	0	0	0	1	0	0	9	0	0
21	FW	(United States) Endri Mustali	1	0	0	0	0	0	0	0	0	1	0	0
22	DF	(United States) Gennaro Nigro	0	0	0	0	0	0	0	0	0	0	0	0
23	MF	(Germany) Max Schneider	9	0	0	0	0	0	0	0	0	9	0	0
24	GK	(United States) Austin Pack	0	0	0	0	0	0	0	0	0	0	0	0
26	DF	(United States) Dion Acoff	4	0	0	0	0	0	0	0	0	4	0	0
27	DF	(England) Laurence Wyke	3	0	0	1	0	0	1	0	0	5	0	0
30	MF	(United States) Sebastian Cruz	5	0	0	0	0	0	0	0	0	5	0	0
32	MF	(United States) Micah Burton	0	0	0	0	0	0	0	0	0	0	0	0
36	DF	(United States) Alex Rodriguez	0	0	0	0	0	0	0	0	0	0	0	0
37	DF	(United States) Jesse Tita	0	0	0	0	0	0	0	0	0	0	0	0
55	DF	(Trinidad and Tobago) Leland Archer	1	0	0	0	0	0	0	0	0	1	0	0
62	DF	(Canada) Nathan Dossantos	6	0	0	1	0	0	1	0	0	8	0	0
	Man.	(England) Dominic Casciato	4	0	0	0	0	0	0	0	0	4	0	0
Total			70	2	0	8	0	0	4	0	0	82	2	0

- Last updated: October 24, 2026
- Source: USLC

== Awards and honors ==
=== USL Championship Team of the Matchday ===
Matchday	Player	Opponent	Position	Ref
1	(Germany) Max Schneider	Birmingham Legion FC	MF	
3	(United States) Russell Cicerone	Pittsburgh Riverhounds SC	FW	
3	(United States) MD Myers	Pittsburgh Riverhounds SC	Bench	
3	(England) Dominic Casciato	Pittsburgh Riverhounds SC	Coach	
4	(United States) Sebastian Cruz	Loudoun United FC	MF	
5	(Germany) Max Schneider (2)	Sporting Club Jacksonville	Bench	
6	(United States) Russell Cicerone (2)	Oakland Roots SC	Bench	
USL Cup 1	(United States) Karsen Henderlong	Sarasota Paradise	MF	
10	(Jamaica) Jahmali Waite	Rhode Island FC	Bench	
USL Cup 2	(United States) MD Myers (2)	Miami FC	FW	
USL Cup 2	(France) Louis Perez	Miami FC	Bench	
11/12	(United States) MD Myers (3)	Phoenix Rising FC	FW	
11/12	(France) Louis Perez (2)	Phoenix Rising FC	MF	
11/12	(England) Dominic Casciato	Phoenix Rising FC	Coach	
13	(Germany) Max Schneider (3)	Louisville City FC	MF	
13	(United States) Charlie Ostrem	Louisville City FC	Bench	
USL Cup 3	(United States) Sebastian Cruz (2)	Sporting Club JAX	MF	
16	(United States) Russell Cicerone (3)	Brooklyn FC	FW	
21	(United States) MD Myers (4)	Miami FC	FW	
21	(United States) Charlie Ostrem (2)	Miami FC	DF	
22	(United States) Russell Cicerone (4)	Louisville City FC	FW	
22	(United States) MD Myers (5)	Louisville City FC	Bench	
23	(United States) MD Myers (6)	Orange County SC	FW	
24	(United States) Conner Antley	Rhode Island FC	DF	
29	(United States) MD Myers (7)	Birmingham Legion FC	FW	
29	(United States) Charlie Ostrem (3)	Birmingham Legion FC	DF	
32	(United States) Sebastian Cruz	indy Eleven	MF	

=== USL Championship Player of the Matchday ===
Matchday	Player	Opponent	Position	Ref
USL Cup 2	(United States) MD Myers	Miami FC	FW	
22	(United States) Russell Cicerone	Louisville City FC	FW	

=== USL Championship Goal of the Matchday ===
Matchday	Player	Opponent	Position	Ref
4	(United States) Sebastian Cruz	Sporting Club Jacksonville	MF	
USL Cup 2	(France) Louis Perez	Miami FC	MF	
14/15	(United States) Russell Cicerone	Charleston Battery	FW	
24	(France) Louis Perez (2)	Rhode Island FC	MF	

=== USL Championship Coach of the Month ===
Month	Name	Ref
March	(England) Dominic Casciato	
May	(England) Dominic Casciato	
