= 2024 Indy Eleven season =

Indy Eleven
2024 season
- Owner: List: Brian Bauer Don Gottwald Shane Hageman Jeffrey Laborsky Fred Merritt Ersal Ozdemir Quinn Ricker Chris Traylor
- Head coach: Sean McAuley
- Stadium: Carroll Stadium
- USL Championship: Eastern Conference: 4th
- USL Playoffs: Conference quarterfinals
- 2024 U.S. Open Cup: Semi-finals
- Top goalscorer: League: Blake, A. Williams (10); All: A. Williams (13)
- Highest home attendance: 10,780 (October 5 vs. Louisville)
- Lowest home attendance: 7,623 (November 3 vs. Rhode Island)
- Average home league attendance: 9,795
- Biggest win: 4–0 (September 28 vs Miami)
- Biggest defeat: 0–5 (August 2 at Charleston)
Home colors	Away colors

The 2024 Indy Eleven season was a domestic season for Indy Eleven, a professional soccer club based in Indianapolis, Indiana, beginning in February 2024 and ending in November 2024, comprising 40 competitive matches and 6 friendlies. It was also the club's eleventh season of existence, their eleventh consecutive season in the second tier of American soccer, and their seventh season in the USL Championship. The team also participated in the U.S. Open Cup, making the semi-finals for the first time in the club's history.

== Background ==
The previous season was the second consecutive season where the USL played a 34-match schedule divided into two conferences with both conferences having a single table. While being the first where all sides from both conferences played against each other.

The 2023 season was seen as relatively successful for Indy, as they qualified for the USL Championship Playoffs for the first time since 2019 by finishing 6th in the Eastern Conference. The team lost to eventual finalists Charleston Battery in the Conference Quarterfinals on October 22, 2023. The team exited the U.S. Open Cup in the third round with a 1–0 away loss to MLS side Columbus Crew on April 26, 2023.

Following the conclusion of the 2023 season the club parted ways with head coach Mark Lowry, who later became the head coach for MLS Next Pro side Real Monarchs. The team announced the arrival of former Manchester United player and Minnesota United interim head coach Sean McAuley as their new head coach on January 8, 2024.

== Roster ==
As of October 26, 2024

No.	Name	Nationality	Position(s)	Date of birth (age)	Signed in	Previous club	League Apps.	League Goals
Goalkeepers
0	Hunter Sulte	(United States)	GK	April 25, 2002 (age 21)	2024	(United States) Portland Timbers (on loan)	26	0
1	Yannik Oettl	(Germany)	GK	November 19, 1996 (age 29)	2023	(United States) Hartford Athletic	26	0
24	Hayden Vostal	(United States)	GK	October 18, 2005 (age 20)	2024	(United States) Indy Eleven Academy	0	0
46	Cayden Crawford	(United States)	GK	September 29, 2006 (age 19)	2024	(United States) Indy Eleven Academy	0	0
Defenders
2	Josh O'Brien	(Republic of Ireland)	DF	February 7, 2003 (age 23)	2024	(Scotland) Hamilton Academical	25	1
3	Aedan Stanley	(United States)	DF	December 13, 1999 (age 26)	2024	(United States) Miami FC	32	0
5	Callum Chapman-Page	(England)	DF	November 6, 1995 (age 30)	2023	(United States) Miami FC	25	1
15	Adrián Diz Pe	(Cuba)	DF	March 4, 1994 (age 32)	2023	(United States) FC Tulsa	55	4
30	Ben Ofeimu	(United States)	DF	September 30, 2000 (age 25)	2024	(United States) Miami FC	30	1
33	Hayden White	(England)	DF	April 15, 1995 (age 31)	2024	(England) Ebbsfleet United	6	0
37	Logan Neidlinger	(United States)	DF	September 6, 2005 (age 21)	2024	(United States) Indy Eleven Adacemy	14	1
41	James Musa	(New Zealand)	DF	April 1, 1992 (age 34)	2024	(United States) Colorado Springs Switchbacks	7	1
44	Macauley King	(England)	DF	October 4, 1995 (age 30)	2023	(United States) Colorado Springs Switchbacks	13	0
55	Maverick McCoy	(United States)	DF	July 24, 2007 (age 19)	2024	(United States) Indy Eleven Adacemy	0	0
Midfielders
6	Cameron Lindley	(United States)	MF	July 18, 1997 (age 29)	2023	(United States) Colorado Springs Switchbacks	62	1
8	Jack Blake	(Scotland)	MF	September 22, 1994 (age 31)	2023	(United States) San Diego Loyal	56	13
12	Diego Sanchez	(United States)	MF	December 12, 2004 (age 21)	2023	(United States) Indiana Fire Academy	3	0
14	Aodhan Quinn	(United States)	MF	March 22, 1992 (age 34)	2023	(United States) Phoenix Rising	39	9
16	Laurence Wootton	(England)	MF	January 10, 2000 (age 26)	2024	(United States) Chicago Fire (on loan)	24	2
20	Ben Mines	(United States)	MF	May 13, 2000 (age 26)	2024	(United States) Miami FC	20	0
22	Tyler Gibson	(United States)	MF	January 12, 1991 (age 35)	2024	(United States) Louisville City	21	1
32	Brem Soumaoro	(Liberia)	MF	August 8, 1996 (age 30)	2024	(Canada) York United FC	8	0
39	Nikola Ivetic	(United States)	MF	June 29, 2007 (age 19)	2024	(United States) Indy Eleven Academy	0	0
Forwards
7	Karsen Henderlong	(United States)	FW	September 24, 2000 (age 25)	2024	(United States) Indiana University	5	0
9	Augustine Williams	(Sierra Leone)	FW	August 3, 1997 (age 29)	2024	(United States) Charleston Battery	31	10
10	Romario Williams	(Jamaica)	FW	August 15, 1994 (age 32)	2024	(United States) Hartford Athletic	18	2
13	Sebastián Guenzatti	(Uruguay)	FW	July 8, 1991 (age 35)	2023	(United States) Tampa Bay Rowdies	61	16
18	Elliot Collier	(New Zealand)	FW	February 22, 1995 (age 31)	2024	(United States) San Diego Loyal	30	5
42	Douglas Martínez	(Honduras)	FW	June 5, 1997 (age 29)	2023	(United States) Sacramento Republic	59	7
99	Maalique Foster	(Jamaica)	FW	November 5, 1996 (age 29)	2024	(United States) Colorado Springs Switchbacks	11	1

== Non-competitive ==
=== Preseason ===
The Eleven released their preseason schedule on January 19, 2024. Six games were announced, four home games and two away games. The Eleven faced clubs in the USL Championship, MLS Next Pro, USL League One, and one collegiate team.

The Eleven concluded their preseason games following a 3–1 victory over Detroit City on February 29. They ended their preseason series undefeated with five wins and one draw, and a +16 goal differential.

February 6 Friendly	Pittsburgh Riverhounds	0–0	Indy Eleven	Pittsburgh, PA
12:00 PM EST		Report		Stadium: Highmark Stadium

February 10 Friendly	Indy Eleven	2–0	Chicago Fire FC II	Westfield, IN
6:30 PM EST	Williams 28'; Blake 31'	Report		Stadium: Grand Park

February 13 Friendly	Indy Eleven	5–0	Indiana Wesleyan University	Westfield, IN
2:00 PM EST	Blake 12', 31'; Henderlong 17'; Molina 50'; Williams 65'	Report		Stadium: Grand Park

February 18 Friendly	Indy Eleven	7–1	Columbus Crew 2	Westfield, IN
3:00 PM EST	Blake 10', 38', 39'; Guenzatti 18'; Martinez 33', 33'; Williams (pen.), 75'	Report	Unknown 24'	Stadium: Grand Park

February 24 Friendly	Lexington SC	0–1	Indy Eleven	Lexington, KY
		Report	Unknown (unknown)

February 29 Friendly	Indy Eleven	3–1	Detroit City	Westfield, IN
3:00 PM EST	Williams 2'; Chapman-Page 29'; Stanley 39'	Report	Unknown (pen.), 17'	Stadium: Grand Park

== Competitive ==
=== USL Championship ===
==== Standings ====
Pos	Team	Pld	W	L	T	GF	GA	GD	Pts	Qualification
1	Louisville City FC (S)	34	24	6	4	86	43	+43	76	Playoffs
2	Charleston Battery	34	18	6	10	68	35	+33	64	Playoffs
3	Detroit City FC	34	15	8	11	46	32	+14	56	Playoffs
4	Indy Eleven	34	14	11	9	49	50	−1	51	Playoffs
5	Rhode Island FC	34	12	7	15	56	41	+15	51	Playoffs
6	Tampa Bay Rowdies	34	14	12	8	55	46	+9	50	Playoffs
7	Pittsburgh Riverhounds SC	34	12	10	12	41	28	+13	48	Playoffs
8	North Carolina FC	34	13	12	9	54	43	+11	48	Playoffs
9	Birmingham Legion FC	34	13	15	6	44	51	−7	45	
10	Hartford Athletic	34	12	14	8	39	52	−13	44	
11	Loudoun United FC	34	11	14	9	44	39	+5	42	
12	Miami FC	34	3	29	2	26	89	−63	11	

Source: USL Championship Standings
Rules for classification: 1) head-to-head points; 2) head-to-head goal differential; 3) points-per game within conference; 4) total wins; 5) total goal differential; 6) total goals scored; 7) points earned against top four Conference finishers; 8) disciplinary points; 9) coin toss or drawing of lots
(S) Players' Shield winner

==== Match results ====
The league announced the 34 week regular season campaign for every club on December 18, 2023. Indy began their season away to Western Conference side Oakland Roots on March 9, with their home opener taking place in week three against Sacramento Republic on March 23. The regular season concluded with an away game against Tampa Bay Rowdies on October 26.

The season consists of 34 matches, with the Eleven playing home and away against each Eastern Conference opponent. Indy faced expansion club Rhode Island FC for the first time ever on July 5, drawing 3–3, and also played against North Carolina FC for the first time since 2020 on April 27, winning 2–1. The top 8 teams in the Eastern Conference will qualify for the 2024 USL Championship playoffs. The Eleven qualified for the playoffs following a 3–2 home win over Birmingham Legion FC on October 19. This marks the first playoff game hosted by Indy Eleven since 2019.

March 9 1	Oakland Roots	2–1	Indy Eleven	Hayward, CA
10:00 PM EST	Cedeno 3'; Tamacas 50'; Njiel (yellow card) 89'; Donasiyano (yellow card) 98'	Report	Blake (yellow card) 24', (goal) 43'; Guenzatti (yellow card) 24'; Henderlong (yellow card) 25'; Chapman-Page (yellow card) 41'; Collier (yellow card) 70'; Lindley (yellow card) 98'	Stadium: Pioneer Stadium; Attendance: 5,146; Referee: Elton Garcia

March 16 2	Memphis 901 FC	1–2	Indy Eleven	Memphis, TN
4:00 PM EDT	Jiminez (yellow card) 15' (yellow-red card) 45'; Yacoubou (yellow card) 25'; Cissoko 91'; Deric (yellow card) 94'; Ward (yellow card) 97' (yellow-red card) 97'	Report	Chapman-Page (yellow card) 8'; Blake 26'; Barbir (yellow card) 35'; Martínez 42', (yellow card) 57'; E. O'Brien (yellow card) 93'	Stadium: Autozone Park; Attendance: 2,621; Referee: Sergii Demianchuk

March 23 3	Indy Eleven	1–1	Sacramento Republic	Indianapolis, IN
7:00 PM EDT	Williams 34'; Diz Pe (yellow card) 71'; Schneider (yellow card) 79'	Report	Chapman-Page 31' (o.g.); Timmer (yellow card) 83'	Stadium: Carroll Stadium; Attendance: 8,451; Referee: Joshua Encarnación

March 30 4	Indy Eleven	1–2	Detroit City	Indianapolis, IN
7:00 PM EDT	Boudadi (yellow card) 15'; Guenzatti 24'; Diz Pe (yellow card) 87'	Report	Diop (yellow card) 42'; Coote 55'; Rodriguez 88'; Carroll (yellow card) 90'	Stadium: Carroll Stadium; Attendance: 9,044; Referee: Velimir Stefanovic

April 6 5	Louisville City	5–3	Indy Eleven	Louisville, KY
4:00 PM EDT	Harris 16', 62', 71'; Wilson 41'; Wynder 50'; Las (yellow card) 77'; Serrano (yellow card) 87'; Gonzalez Asensi (yellow card) 96'	Report	Martinez (yellow card) 32'; Blake 34', 59'; Boudadi (yellow card) 40'; Oettl (yellow card) 71'; McCabe 82' (o.g.)	Stadium: Lynn Family Stadium; Attendance: 11,330; Referee: Jeremy Scheer

April 13 6	Indy Eleven	2–4	Charleston Battery	Indianapolis, IN
7:00 PM EDT	Ikoba 27'; Guenzatti 28'; Chapman-Page (yellow card) 45+2'; Blake (yellow card) 52'; Stanley (yellow card) 68'; King (yellow card) 90+1'	Report	Ycaza 19'; Allan (yellow card) 31'; Markanich 45+2'; King 75' (o.g.); Smith (yellow card) 78'; Myers 86'	Stadium: Carroll Stadium; Attendance: 8,556; Referee: Greg Dopka

April 20 7	Colorado Springs Switchbacks	1–1	Indy Eleven	Colorado Springs, CO
8:00 PM EDT	Damus 3'; Rocha (yellow card) 15'; Tejada (yellow card) 20'; Rocha (yellow card) 15'; Hanya (yellow card) 45'; Ackwei (red card) 58'; Foster (yellow card) 70'	Report	Chapman-Page (yellow card) 14'; Lindley (yellow card) 14'; Martínez (yellow card) 18'; Williams 31'; Ofeimu (yellow card) 87'	Stadium: Weidner Field; Attendance: 6,687; Referee: Trevor Wiseman

April 27 8	Indy Eleven	2–1	North Carolina FC	Indianapolis, IN
7:00 PM EDT	Ikoba (yellow card) 45+1'; Maldonado 48' (o.g.); Martínez 75'	Report	Perez 51'; Placias (yellow card) 72'; Armstrong (yellow card) 74'; Brewer (yellow card) 85'; da Costa (yellow card) 90+1'	Stadium: Carroll Stadium; Attendance: 10,071; Referee: Eric Tattersall

May 4 9	Monterey Bay	0–1	Indy Eleven	Seaside, CA
10:00 PM EDT	Archimède (yellow card) 75'; Fehr (yellow card) 87'	Report	Stanley (yellow card) 71'; Diz Pe (yellow card) 74'; Collier 88'; Blake (yellow card) 90+2'	Stadium: Cardinale Stadium; Attendance: 4,504; Referee: Corbyn May

May 12 10	Miami FC	1–3	Indy Eleven	Miami, FL
7:00 PM EDT	Cardona (yellow card) 19'; López (yellow card) 31'; Mitrano (yellow card) 45+1'; Luis Pedro 57'	Report	Gibson (yellow card) 3'; Diz Pe 41'; Lindley (yellow card) 61'; Williams (pen.), 67', 70'; Williams (yellow card) 90+2'	Stadium: FIU Stadium; Attendance: 1,004; Referee: Muhammad Hassan

May 18 11	Indy Eleven	4–1	Hartford Athletic	Indianapolis, IN
7:00 PM EDT	Blake (pen.), 3'; Williams (yellow card) 11'; Diz Pe (yellow card) 15'; Ofeimu 45+3'; Martínez 54'; Williams 58'	Report	Ngalina 80'; Vancaeyezeele (yellow card) 82'	Stadium: Carroll Stadium; Attendance: 10,021; Referee: Elton García

May 25 12	Indy Eleven	2–1	Phoenix Rising	Indianapolis, IN
7:00 PM EDT	Blake (pen.), 26'; Lindley (yellow card) 41'; Boudadi (yellow card) 45+2'; Blake (yellow card) 57'; Blake 64'; E. O'Brien (yellow card) 90'	Report	Hernández 19'; Hernández (yellow card) 27'; Scearce (yellow card) 32'; Wyke (yellow card) 50'; Ríos Novo (yellow card) 62'	Stadium: Carroll Stadium; Attendance: 10,066; Referee: Calin Radosav

June 1 13	Pittsburgh Riverhounds	1–2	Indy Eleven	Pittsburgh, PA
7:00 PM EDT	Griffin 57'; Diene (yellow card) 90+3'	Report	O'Brien 23'; O'Brien (yellow card) 39'; Guenzatti 46'; Stanley (yellow card) 51'; Mines (yellow card) 59'; Collier (yellow card) 90+2'	Stadium: Highmark Stadium; Attendance: 5,002; Referee: Lorenzo Hernandez

June 9 14	Birmingham Legion	0–1	Indy Eleven	Birmingham, AL
7:00 PM EDT		Report	Blake (pen.), 34'	Stadium: Protective Stadium; Attendance: 5,147; Referee: Natalie Simon

June 15 15	Indy Eleven	1–0	San Antonio FC	Indianapolis, IN
7:00 PM EDT	Ofeimu (yellow card) 2'; Burks 29' (o.g.); Mines (yellow card) 52'; Chapman-Page (yellow card) 79'; Blake (yellow card) 88'	Report	Hernández (penalty missed) 16'; Taintor (yellow card) 32'; Chol (yellow card) 50'; Gomez (yellow card) 54'	Stadium: Carroll Stadium; Attendance: 10,491; Referee: Adam Kilpatrick

June 22 16	Indy Eleven	0–1	Orange County	Indianapolis, IN
7:00 PM EDT	Ofeimu (yellow card) 45+8'; R. Williams (yellow card) 52'	Report	Zubak 25'; Sorto (yellow card) 35'; Zubak (yellow card) 42'; Chattha (yellow card) 73'	Stadium: Carroll Stadium; Attendance: 9,490; Referee: Joe Surgan

July 5 17	Rhode Island FC	3–3	Indy Eleven	Smithfield, RI
7:30 PM EDT	Nodarse (yellow card) 19'; Nodarse 52', 69'; Williams (yellow card) 80'; Kwizera (yellow card) 84'; Angking 90+5'	Report	Wootton 20'; Collier 28'; Mines (yellow card) 35'; Sulte (yellow card) 52'; O'Brien (yellow card) 59'; Gibson 79'	Stadium: Beirne Stadium; Attendance: 4,728; Referee: Ricardo Montero

July 13 18	Indy Eleven	1–1	Loudoun United	Indianapolis, IN
7:00 PM EDT	Chapman-Page (yellow card) 28'; R. Williams (yellow card) 46'; Collier 74'	Report	Leggett 58'; Ryan (yellow card) 63'	Stadium: Carroll Stadium; Attendance: 9,672; Referee: Brandon Stevis

July 20 19	Indy Eleven	0–2	Tampa Bay Rowdies	Indianapolis, IN
7:00 PM EDT	Wooton (yellow card) 33'	Report	Crisostomo (yellow card) 13'; Jennings 36'; Rivera 80'	Stadium: Carroll Stadium; Attendance: 10,636; Referee: Thomas Snyder

July 26 20	FC Tulsa	0–0	Indy Eleven	Tulsa, OK
8:30 PM EDT	Goodrum (yellow card) 26'; Laszo (yellow card) 47'; St Clair (yellow card) 52'	Report	Chapman-Page (yellow card) 27'; Diz (yellow card) 58'; O'Brien (yellow card) 72'; Ofeimu (yellow card) 79'	Stadium: ONEOK Field; Attendance: 3,490; Referee: Lorenzo Hernandez

August 2 21	Charleston Battery	5–0	Indy Eleven	Mount Pleasant, SC
7:30 PM EDT	Myers 52'; Ycaza 70'; Markanich 78'; Conway 85'; Crawford 90+5'	Report	A. Williams (yellow card) 51'; Diz Pe (yellow card) 67'; Neidlinger (yellow card) 77'	Stadium: Patriots Point Soccer Complex; Attendance: 2,845; Referee: Joshua Encarnación

August 7 22	Indy Eleven	1–0	Rhode Island FC	Indianapolis, IN
7:00 PM EDT	Guenzatti 34'; Martínez (yellow card) 37'; Guenzatti (yellow card) 50'; Diz Pe (yellow card) 90+5'	Report	Stoneman (yellow card) 44'	Stadium: Carroll Stadium; Attendance: 8,091; Referee: Ricardo Fierro

August 11 23	Indy Eleven	1–3	New Mexico United	Indianapolis, IN
5:00 PM EDT	Quinn (yellow card) 27'; Neidlinger 28'; Diz Pe (yellow card) 61'; Chapman-Page (yellow card) 78'	Report	Rivas (yellow card) 27'; Houssou (yellow card) 27'; Ryden (yellow card) 45+2'; Swartz 53'; Rivas 64'; Hurst 75'; Hurst (yellow card) 90+4'	Stadium: Carroll Stadium; Attendance: 10,013; Referee: Adam Kilpatrick

August 24 24	Las Vegas Lights	3–2	Indy Eleven	Las Vegas, NV
10:30 PM EDT	Ngando 2'; Arozarena (yellow card) 21'; Ngando (yellow card) 33'; Noël 43'; Bennett 45+4'; Nigro (yellow card) 54'	Report	Guenzatti 26'; Collier 45+3'; Mines (yellow card) 56'	Stadium: Cashman Field; Attendance: 4.532; Referee: Trevor Wiseman

August 31 25	Indy Eleven	1–1	Pittsburgh Riverhounds	Indianapolis, IN
7:00 PM EDT	Martínez (yellow card) 34'; Lindley (yellow card) 71'; R. Williams (yellow card) 72'; R. Williams 90+7'	Report	Hogan (red card) 4'; Mertz (yellow card) 66'; Griffin 73'	Stadium: Carroll Stadium; Attendance: 10,319; Referee: Elijio Arreguin

September 7 26	Hartford Athletic	0–0	Indy Eleven	Hartford, CT
7:00 PM EDT		Report	Blake (yellow card) 59'; White (yellow card) 72'	Stadium: Trinity Health Stadium; Attendance: 5,283; Referee: Thomas Snyder

September 14 27	Indy Eleven	3–1	El Paso Locomotive	Indianapolis, IN
7:00 PM EDT	R. Williams 12'; Foster 49'; White (yellow card) 58'; Collier 77'; Lindley (yellow card) 90+6'	Report	Alfaro (yellow card) 63'; Zacarías 83'; Coronado (yellow card) 86' (yellow-red card) 90+3'; Lyons (yellow card) 86' (yellow-red card) 90+4'; Dollenmayer (yellow card) 88'	Stadium: Carroll Stadium; Attendance: 10,132; Referee: Sergii Demianchuk

September 21 28	North Carolina FC	2–0	Indy Eleven	Cary, NC
7:30 PM EDT	Mentzingen 19'; Maldonado (yellow card) 22'; Batista (yellow card) 45+7'; Mentzingen (yellow card) 55'; Martin (yellow card) 73'; Anderson 77'; Anderson (yellow card) 79'	Report	R. Williams (yellow card) 33'; White (yellow card) 45'	Stadium: WakeMed Soccer Park; Attendance: 2,478; Referee: Jeremy Scheer

September 28 29	Indy Eleven	4–0	Miami FC	Indianapolis, IN
7:00 PM EDT	Quinn (yellow card) 42'; Blake (pen.), 62'; A. Williams 73', 84', 86', (yellow card) 87'; Diz Pe (red card) 77'; Soumaoro (yellow card) 87'	Report	Gavilanes (yellow card) 25'; Knutson (yellow card) 60'; Ndiaye (red card) 77'; Palacios (yellow card) 90+1'	Stadium: Carroll Stadium; Attendance: 10,145; Referee: Matthew Thompson

October 5 30	Indy Eleven	2–2	Louisville City	Indianapolis, IN
7:00 PM EDT	Quinn (yellow card) 4'; Foster (yellow card) 20'; A. Williams 45+3', 68'	Report	Dia 12'; McFadden (yellow card) 29'; Serrano (yellow card) 44'; Adams (yellow card) 85'; Morris 90+4'	Stadium: Carroll Stadium; Attendance: 10,780; Referee: Alyssa Nichols

October 8 31	Loudoun United	0–1	Indy Eleven	Leesburg, VA
7:00 PM EDT	Johnston (yellow card) 16'; Fauroux (yellow card) 53'; Leerman (yellow card) 58'; Tingey (yellow card) 63'	Report	Martínez (yellow card) 53'; Mines (yellow card) 67'; Musa 83'; Diz Pe (red card) 85'	Stadium: Segra Field; Attendance: 1,787; Referee: Abdou Ndiaye

October 12 32	Detroit City	0–0	Indy Eleven	Hamtramck, MI
4:00 PM EDT	Murphy (yellow card) 39'; Diop (yellow card) 69'; Rodriguez (yellow card) 78'	Report	Soumaoro (yellow card) 57'; Musa (yellow card) 69'	Stadium: Keyworth Stadium; Attendance: 6,240; Referee: Gerald Flores

October 19 33	Indy Eleven	3–2	Birmingham Legion	Indianapolis, IN
7:00 PM EDT	Kavita 14' (o.g.); Blake 15'; A. Williams (yellow card) 79'; Wootton 86'	Report	Pinho 54'; Zouhir 90'	Stadium: Carroll Stadium; Attendance: 10,540; Referee: Matthew Corrigan

October 26 34	Tampa Bay Rowdies	3–0	Indy Eleven	Bradenton, FL
7:30 PM EDT	Arteaga (pen.), 9'; Chrisostomo 25'; Hilton (yellow card) 50'; Jennings 63'; Munjoma (yellow card) 73'; Worth (yellow card) 90+2'	Report	Chapman-Page (yellow card) 52'	Stadium: IMG Academy Soccer Stadium; Attendance: 496; Referee: Calin Radosav

==== USL Cup Playoffs ====
The top eight teams in each USL Championship conference advanced to the 2024 USL Championship Playoffs. The Eleven qualified for the playoffs following a 3–2 home win over Birmingham Legion FC on October 19. The team secured a home game in the Conference Quarterfinals and a guaranteed top 4 conference finish on October 23 following Rhode Island FC's draw against Charleston Battery. The Eleven lost 2–3 at home to Rhode Island FC in the Conference Quarterfinals on November 3.

Conference Quarterfinals; November 1–3	Conference Semifinals; November 9–10
E1	Louisville City FC	3
E8	North Carolina FC	2
E1	Louisville City FC	0
E5	Rhode Island FC	3
E4	Indy Eleven	2
E5	Rhode Island FC	3
Eastern Conference
E3	Detroit City FC	1 (1)
E6	Tampa Bay Rowdies (p)	1 (3)
E6	Tampa Bay Rowdies	1
E2	Charleston Battery	2
E2	Charleston Battery	1
E7	Pittsburgh Riverhounds SC	0
W1	New Mexico United	2
W8	Phoenix Rising FC	1
W1	New Mexico United	0
W4	Las Vegas Lights FC	1
W4	Las Vegas Lights FC (p)	0 (3)
W5	Sacramento Republic FC	0 (2)
Western Conference
W3	Memphis 901 FC	0
W6	Orange County SC (a.e.t.)	1
W6	Orange County SC	1
W2	Colorado Springs Switchbacks FC (a.e.t.)	2
W2	Colorado Springs Switchbacks FC	2
W7	Oakland Roots SC	0

Conference Finals; November 16
E5	Rhode Island FC	2
E2	Charleston Battery	1
W4	Las Vegas Lights FC	0
W2	Colorado Springs Switchbacks FC	1

USL Championship Final; November 23
E5	Rhode Island FC	0
W2	Colorado Springs Switchbacks FC	3

===== Playoff results =====
November 3 Conference Quarterfinals	Indy Eleven	2–3	Rhode Island FC	Indianapolis, IN
1:00 PM EDT	Quinn 35'; Martínez (yellow card) 45+2'; Foster (yellow card) 58'; Musa (yellow card) 69'; Martínez 78'; Ofeimu (yellow card) 90+2'	Report	Williams (pen.), 19', 38', 52'; Herivaux (yellow card) 81'	Stadium: Carroll Stadium; Attendance: 7,623; Referee: Joshua Encarnación

=== U.S. Open Cup ===
As a member of the USL Championship, Indy Eleven entered the U.S. Open Cup tournament in the third round. The Eleven qualified for the Round of 32 for the first time since 2016 with a 1–0 victory over the Chicago Fire FC II on April 17, the team's first away victory in the U.S. Open Cup and their first shutout of the season.

The draw for the Round of 32 took place on April 18, with the Eleven hosting fellow USL Championship club San Antonio FC at home on May 8. On April 18, the Eleven announced that the match against San Antonio would be played at the Bud and Jackie Sellick Bowl on the campus of Butler University in Indianapolis.

The Eleven defeated San Antonio 2–0 on May 8 to advance to the Round of 16 for the first time in their history. In the Round of 16 on May 22, the Eleven defeated fellow USL Championship club Detroit City FC 3–0, who had defeated MLS side Houston Dynamo in the Round of 32.

The Eleven faced MLS side Atlanta United in the Quarter-finals on July 9, the first ever meeting of the two teams and Indy's first ever appearance in the Open Cup Quarter-finals. The Eleven's 2–1 victory was the team's first ever win over an MLS side, and advanced the team to a historic semi-final matchup. Indy Eleven's tournament ended in a 0–2 away loss to Sporting Kansas City on August 27 in the Eastern Semi-final. The Eleven were the only non-MLS team to reach the semi-finals and the result is the team's best-ever performance in the tournament.

==== Match results ====
April 17 Third round	Chicago Fire FC II (Illinois)	0–1	(Indiana) Indy Eleven	Bridgeview, IL
8:00 PM EDT	Glasgow (yellow card) 73'; Rochester (yellow card) 80'	Report	Martínez 4'; Ofeimu (yellow card) 31'; Schneider (yellow card) 67'; Diz Pe (yellow card) 67'; Gibson (yellow card) 85'	Stadium: SeatGeek Stadium; Attendance: 326; Referee: Peter Bernardy

May 8 Round of 32	Indy Eleven (Indiana)	2–0	(Texas) San Antonio FC	Indianapolis, IN
7:00 PM EDT	A. Williams 2'; Blake 10'; Guenzatti (yellow card) 58'	Report	Hernández (yellow card) 20'; Chol (yellow card) 41'; Burks (yellow card) 66'; Lacey (yellow card) 69'	Stadium: Sellick Bowl; Attendance: 4,086; Referee: Kyle Johnston

May 22 Round of 16	Indy Eleven (Indiana)	3–0	(Michigan) Detroit City FC	Indianapolis, IN
7:00 PM EDT	Ofeimu (yellow card) 7'; Carroll 14' (o.g.); A. Williams 33'; Ofeimu 36'; Blake (yellow card) 65'; Schneider (yellow card) 90+1'	Report	Amoo-Mensah (yellow card) 61'	Stadium: Carroll Stadium; Referee: Yosuke Araki

July 9 Quarterfinals	Atlanta United (Georgia (U.S. state))	1–2	(Indiana) Indy Eleven	Kennesaw, GA
7:00 PM EDT	Wiley (yellow card) 48'; Firmino 90+2'	Report	A. Williams 31'; Martínez (yellow card) 52'; McCarty 83' (o.g.)	Stadium: Fifth Third Stadium; Attendance: 2,417; Referee: Sergii Demianchuk

August 27 Semifinals	Sporting Kansas City	2–0	(Indiana) Indy Eleven	Kansas City, Kansas
10:00 PM EDT	Russell 14'; Rosero 35'; Sallói (yellow card) 68'; Pulido (penalty missed) 90+6'	Report	Quinn (yellow card) 19'	Stadium: Children's Mercy Park; Attendance: 10,812; Referee: Rosendo Mendoza

== Statistics ==
=== Appearances and goals ===
As of October 26, 2024.

No.	Pos	Nat	Player	Total		USLC		U.S. Open Cup	
No.	Pos	Nat	Player	Apps	Goals	Apps	Goals	Apps	Goals
0	GK	(United States) USA	Hunter Sulte	31	0	27	0	4	0
1	GK	(Germany) GER	Yannik Oettl	9	0	8	0	1	0
2	DF	(Republic of Ireland) IRL	Josh O'Brien	31	1	26	1	5	0
3	DF	(United States) USA	Aedan Stanley	39	0	34	0	5	0
5	DF	(England) ENG	Callum Chapman-Page	19	0	17	0	2	0
6	MF	(United States) USA	Cam Lindley	34	0	30	0	4	0
7	FW	(United States) USA	Karsen Henderlong	6	0	6	0	0	0
8	MF	(Scotland) SCO	Jack Blake	32	10	28	9	4	1
9	FW	(Sierra Leone) SLE	Augustine Williams	38	13	33	10	5	3
10	FW	(Jamaica) JAM	Romario Williams	19	2	19	2	0	0
12	MF	(United States) USA	Diego Sanchez	3	0	2	0	1	0
13	FW	(Uruguay) URU	Sebastian Guenzatti	33	5	29	5	4	0
14	MF	(United States) USA	Aodhan Quinn	13	1	12	1	1	0
15	DF	(Cuba) CUB	Adrian Diz Pe	32	1	29	1	3	0
16	MF	(England) ENG	Laurence Wootton	28	2	24	2	4	0
18	FW	(New Zealand) NZL	Elliot Collier	36	5	31	5	5	0
20	MF	(United States) USA	Ben Mines	26	0	22	0	4	0
21	MF	(Republic of Ireland) IRL	Ethan O'Brien	4	0	3	0	1	0
22	MF	(United States) USA	Tyler Gibson	24	1	21	1	3	0
24	GK	(United States) USA	Hayden Vostal	0	0	0	0	0	0
30	DF	(United States) USA	Ben Ofeimu	33	2	28	1	5	1
32	MF	(Liberia) LBR	Brem Soumaoro	9	0	9	0	0	0
33	DF	(England) ENG	Hayden White	7	0	7	0	0	0
34	MID	(Germany) GER	Max Schneider	11	0	7	0	4	0
37	DF	(United States) USA	Logan Neidlinger	17	1	16	1	1	0
39	MF	(United States) USA	Nikola Ivetic	0	0	0	0	0	0
41	DF	(New Zealand) NZL	James Musa	9	1	8	1	1	0
42	FW	(Honduras) HON	Douglas Martinez	35	5	30	4	5	1
44	DF	(England) ENG	Macauley King	3	0	2	0	1	0
46	GK	(United States) USA	Cayden Crawford	0	0	0	0	0	0
55	DF	(United States) USA	Maverick McCoy	0	0	0	0	0	0
99	FW	(Jamaica) JAM	Maalique Foster	13	1	12	1	1	0
Players who left Indy during the season:
4	DF	(United States) USA	Danny Barbir	3	0	3	0	0	0
17	MF	(United States) USA	Tega Ikoba	12	1	9	1	3	0
23	DF	(Morocco) MAR	Younes Boudadi	9	0	8	0	1	0
30	DF	(United States) USA	Jay Klein	0	0	0	0	0	0
50	FW	(El Salvador) ESA	Roberto Molina	5	0	5	0	0	0

Source: Indy stats

=== Disciplinary record ===
No.	Pos.	Name	USLC		Playoffs		U.S. Open Cup		Total	
No.	Pos.	Name	Booked	Sent off (straight red)	Booked	Sent off (straight red)	Booked	Sent off (straight red)	Booked	Sent off (straight red)
0	GK	(United States) Hunter Sulte	1	0	0	0	0	0	1	0
1	GK	(Germany) Yannik Oettl	1	0	0	0	0	0	1	0
2	DF	(Republic of Ireland) Josh O'Brien	4	0	0	0	0	0	4	0
3	DF	(United States) Aedan Stanley	3	0	0	0	0	0	3	0
5	DF	(England) Callum Chapman-Page	8	0	0	0	0	0	8	0
6	MF	(United States) Cameron Lindley	6	0	0	0	0	0	6	0
7	FW	(United States) Karsen Henderlong	1	0	0	0	0	0	1	0
8	MF	(Scotland) Jack Blake	6	0	0	0	1	0	7	0
9	FW	(Sierra Leone) Augustine Williams	4	0	0	0	0	0	4	0
10	FW	(Jamaica) Romario Williams	5	0	0	0	0	0	5	0
13	FW	(Uruguay) Sebastián Guenzatti	2	0	0	0	1	0	3	0
14	MF	(United States) Aodhan Quinn	3	0	0	0	1	0	4	0
15	DF	(Cuba) Adrián Diz Pe	7	2	0	0	1	0	8	2
16	MF	(England) Laurence Wootton	1	0	0	0	0	0	1	0
17	FW	(United States) Tega Ikoba	1	0	0	0	0	0	1	0
18	FW	(New Zealand) Elliot Collier	2	0	0	0	0	0	2	0
20	MF	(United States) Ben Mines	5	0	0	0	0	0	5	0
21	MF	(Republic of Ireland) Ethan O'Brien	1	0	0	0	0	0	1	0
22	MF	(United States) Tyler Gibson	1	0	0	0	1	0	2	0
23	DF	(Morocco) Younes Boudadi	3	0	0	0	0	0	3	0
30	DF	(United States) Ben Ofeimu	4	0	1	0	2	0	7	0
32	MF	(Liberia) Brem Soumaoro	2	0	0	0	0	0	2	0
33	DF	(England) Hayden White	3	0	0	0	0	0	3	0
34	MF	(Germany) Max Schneider	1	0	0	0	2	0	3	0
37	DF	(United States) Logan Neidlinger	1	0	0	0	0	0	1	0
41	DF	(New Zealand) James Musa	1	0	1	0	0	0	2	0
42	FW	(Honduras) Douglas Martínez	6	0	1	0	1	0	8	0
44	DF	(United States) Macauley King	1	0	0	0	0	0	1	0
99	FW	(Jamaica) Maalique Foster	1	0	1	0	0	0	2	0

Source: Indy Stats

=== Clean sheets ===
No.	Name	USLC	Playoffs	U.S. Open Cup	Total	Games Played
0	(United States) Hunter Sulte	9	0	2	11	31
1	(Germany) Yannik Oettl	0	0	1	1	9
24	(United States) Hayden Vostal	0	0	0	0	0
46	(United States) Cayden Crawford	0	0	0	0	0

Source: Indy stats

=== Goals ===
Rank	No.	Name	USLC	Playoffs	U.S. Open Cup	Total	Games Played
1	9	(Sierra Leone) Augustine Williams	10	0	3	13	38
2	8	(Scotland) Jack Blake	10	0	1	11	32
T-3	13	(Uruguay) Sebastian Guenzatti	5	0	0	5	33
T-3	42	(Honduras) Douglas Martinez	3	1	1	5	35
T-3	18	(New Zealand) Elliot Collier	5	0	0	5	36
T-6	10	(Jamaica) Romario Williams	2	0	0	2	19
T-6	16	(England) Laurence Wootton	2	0	0	2	28
T-6	30	(United States) Ben Ofeimu	1	0	1	2	33
T-9	41	(New Zealand) James Musa	1	0	0	1	9
T-9	17	(United States) Tega Ikoba	1	0	0	1	12
T-9	14	(United States) Aodhan Quinn	0	1	0	1	13
T-9	99	(Jamaica) Maalique Foster	1	0	0	1	13
T-9	37	(United States) Logan Neidlinger	1	0	0	1	17
T-9	22	(United States) Tyler Gibson	1	0	0	1	24
T-9	2	(Republic of Ireland) Josh O'Brien	1	0	0	1	31
T-9	15	(Cuba) Adrian Diz Pe	1	0	0	1	32

Source: Indy stats

== Awards ==
USL Championship Team of the Week Selections
Week	Starters			Bench		Opponent(s)	Link
1	(Scotland) Jack Blake	(Morocco) Younes Boudadi				Oakland	
2	(Scotland) Jack Blake	(United States) Aedan Stanley				Memphis	
5	(Scotland) Jack Blake					Louisville	
8				(England) Callum Chapman-Page		North Carolina	
9	(Scotland) Jack Blake			(Cuba) Adrian Diz Pe		Monterey Bay	
10	(United States) Aedan Stanley	(Cuba) Adrian Diz Pe	(Sierra Leone) A. Williams			Miami	
11	(United States) Aedan Stanley			(Morocco) Younes Boudadi	(United States) Ben Ofeimu	Hartford	
12	(Scotland) Jack Blake					Phoenix	
13	(United States) Ben Ofeimu					Pittsburgh	
15	(United States) Hunter Sulte					San Antonio	
19				(United States) Ben Ofeimu		Loudoun	
25	(Scotland) Jack Blake					Las Vegas	
26				(United States) Ben Ofeimu		Pittsburgh	
27				(Cuba) Adrian Diz Pe		Hartford	
28	(Scotland) Jack Blake			(Jamaica) Romario Williams	(Jamaica) Maalique Foster	El Paso	
30	(Sierra Leone) A. Williams			(Scotland) Jack Blake		Miami	
31	(Sierra Leone) A. Williams					Louisville	
32	(United States) Ben Ofeimu			(United States) Hunter Sulte		Loudoun, Detroit	
33	(Scotland) Jack Blake					Birmingham	

USL Championship Player of the Week
Week	Player	Opponent(s)	Link
10	(United States) Aedan Stanley	Miami	
30	(Sierra Leone) Augustine Williams	Miami	

USL Championship Save of the Week
Week	Player	Opponent(s)	Link
15	(United States) Hunter Sulte	San Antonio	
19	(United States) Hunter Sulte	Loudoun	
23	(United States) Hunter Sulte	New Mexico	
31	(United States) Hunter Sulte	Louisville	

USL Championship Coach of the Month
Month	Coach	Month Record (W–D–L)	Link
May	(England) Sean McAuley	(6–0–0)	

== Kits ==
Home	Away

Type	Shirt	Shorts	Socks	First appearance / Record
Home	Blue	Blue	Blue	Match 3 vs. Sacramento / 8–3–4
Away	Red	Red	Red	Match 1 vs. Oakland / 6–3–3

== See also ==
- Indy Eleven
- List of Indy Eleven seasons
- 2024 in American soccer
- 2024 USL Championship season
