= Max Schneider (footballer) =

German footballer (born 2000)

Personal information
- Date of birth: 28 July 2000 (age 26)
- Place of birth: Cologne, Germany
- Height: 6 ft 3 in (1.91 m)
- Position: Midfielder

Team information
- Current team: Tampa Bay Rowdies
- Number: 23

Youth career
- 2017–2019: Bayer Leverkusen

College career
Years	Team	Apps	(Gls)
2019–2021	Marshall Thundering Herd	52	(6)

Senior career*
Years	Team	Apps	(Gls)
2022	St. Louis City 2	20	(3)
2023	St. Louis City	0	(0)
2023	→ St. Louis City 2 (loan)	26	(0)
2024	Indy Eleven	8	(0)
2024	→ Union Omaha (loan)	9	(0)
2025	Union Omaha	27	(4)
2026–	Tampa Bay Rowdies	29	(1)
- * Club domestic league appearances and goals as of 17:58, 8 November 2026 (UTC)

Max Schneider (born 28 July 2000) is a German professional footballer who plays as a midfielder for USL Championship team Tampa Bay Rowdies.

== Early years ==
Schneider was born in Cologne, Germany and played for the academy of Bayer Leverkusen before moving to the United States to play college soccer with the Marshall Thundering Herd. He never played for the Leverkusen first team, however, he was called up to the bench for a Europa League match.

=== College career ===
Schneider played soccer for Marshall University from 2019 until 2022. He made a total of 52 appearances and scored 6 goals over three seasons for the team. He was a part of the team that won the 2020 NCAA College Cup and won numerous accolades throughout his career, including Conference USA Commissioner's Honor Roll, Conference USA All-Freshman Team, 2020 Second Team All-Conference USA, 2020 United Soccer Coaches All-Region Second Team, 2020 NCAA All-Tournament Team, and 2021 Second Team All-Conference USA.

== Club career ==
=== St. Louis City 2 ===
On 7 February 2022, Schneider signed with St. Louis City 2 for the inaugural MLS Next Pro season. On 25 March, Schneider started in the inaugural game for St. Louis City 2 and MLS Next Pro in a 2–0 against Rochester New York FC. Schneider scored his first goal for the club in a 4–3 win against the Tacoma Defiance.

=== St. Louis City ===
On 18 November 2022, St. Louis City SC announced that it has exercised a clause in Schneider's contract to promote him to the first team for the team's inaugural Major League Soccer season in 2023. On 31 December 2023, his contract was declined and he was a free agent.

==== St. Louis City 2 (loan) ====
On 10 March 2023, Schneider signed for St. Louis City 2 on loan from St. Louis City SC. On 26 March 2023 he debuted in a 1–1 draw against Tacoma Defiance at the CityPark. Schneider joined the St. Louis City SC first team on a short-term loan on 16 June 2023.

=== Indy Eleven ===
Schneider signed with USL Championship club Indy Eleven on 18 January 2024. He made his debut for Indy Eleven on 23 March 2024 in a 1–1 draw against Sacramento Republic. Schneider provided the assist for Augustine Williams' equalizing goal.

=== Union Omaha ===
On 18 July 2024, USL League One club Union Omaha announced they had signed Schneider on loan from Indy Eleven. He made his debut for the club on 19 July in a 2–0 loss to Northern Colorado Hailstorm FC in the USL Jägermeister Cup, replacing forward Zeiko Lewis in the 62nd minute. Schneider made his league debut for the club on 27 July, in a 1–0 home loss to Chattanooga Red Wolves SC. Schneider made his first start for Omaha in a 1–0 win over Central Valley Fuego FC on 9 August. Indy Eleven announced they had temporarily recalled Schneider from his loan on 22 August 2024. Schneider returned on loan with Omaha by their next match, a 3–1 home victory over Central Valley Fuego FC on 26 August.

Schneider scored the opening goal in Union Omaha's 3–0 victory over Spokane Velocity FC in the USL League One playoffs final on 17 November 2024, striking in the 3rd minute. His winning goal guaranteed Omaha as the first team in league history to win multiple playoff titles.

Schneider joined Omaha on a permanent basis ahead of the 2025 season. He started in Omaha's season opening 0–3 defeat away to Greenville Triumph SC on March 12, 2025. He scored his first regular season goal for the club on 29 March, in a 3–1 away victory over South Georgia Tormenta FC. Schneider ended the 2025 regular season with 33 total appearances, including 27 league appearances, and 3 total goals.

=== Tampa Bay Rowdies ===
On 5 December 2025, USL Championship club the Tampa Bay Rowdies announced they had signed Schneider ahead of the 2026 season.

== Career statistics ==
=== Club ===
As of match played 30 October 2026

Appearances and goals by club, season and competition
Club	Season	League			League Cup		U.S. Open Cup		Playoffs		Total	
Club	Season	Division	Apps	Goals	Apps	Goals	Apps	Goals	Apps	Goals	Apps	Goals
St. Louis City 2	2022	MLS Next Pro	20	3	—		2	0	—		22	3
St. Louis City SC	2023	MLS	0	0	—		0	0	—		0	0
St. Louis City 2 (loan)	2023	MLS Next Pro	26	0	—		0	0	—		26	0
Indy Eleven	2024	USLC	8	0	—		4	0	0	0	12	0
Union Omaha (loan)	2024	USL1	9	0	3 (Note: Appearances in USL League One Cup)	0	3	0	3 (Note: Appearances in USL League One playoffs)	1	18	1
Union Omaha	2025	USL1	27	3	3 (Note: Appearances in USL Cup)	0	3	0	1	0	34	3
Tampa Bay Rowdies	2026	USLC	30	1	4	1	0	0	1 (Note: Appearances in USL Championship playoffs)	0	36	2
Career total			120	7	10	1	13	0	5	1	148	9

== Honours ==
=== Marshall Thundering Herd ===
- Conference USA regular season: 2020
- NCAA National Championship: 2020

=== Union Omaha ===
- USL League One regular season: 2024
- USL League One playoff: 2024
- USL League One All-League First Team: 2025
