= Laurence Wootton =

English footballer (born 2000)

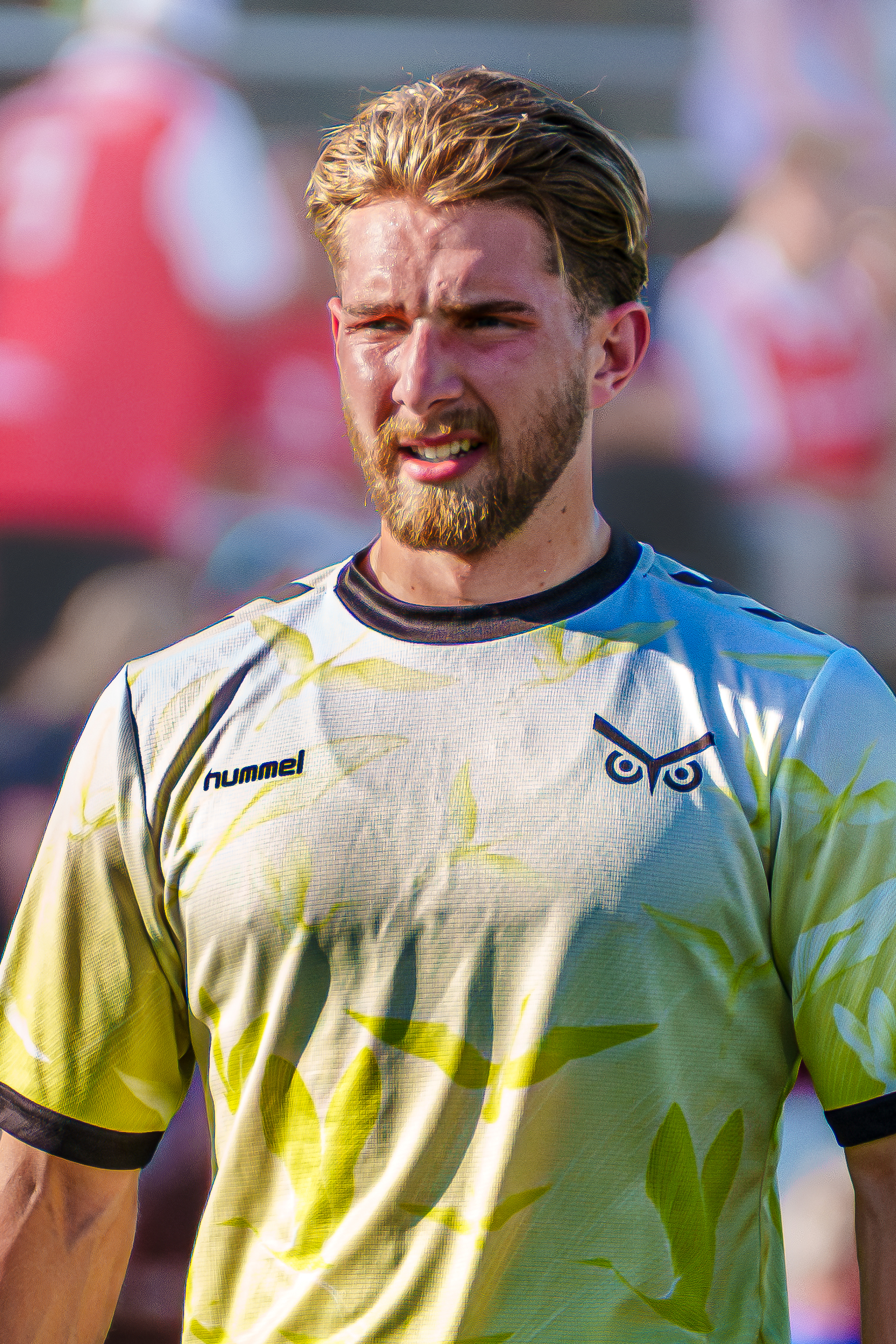
- Wooton with Union Omaha in 2026

Personal information
- Full name: Laurence Thomas Wootton
- Date of birth: 10 January 2000 (age 26)
- Place of birth: Halstead, England
- Height: 1.75 m (5 ft 9 in)
- Position: Midfielder

Team information
- Current team: Union Omaha
- Number: 16

Youth career
- 2006–2017: Stoke City
- 2017–2020: Cardiff City

College career
Years	Team	Apps	(Gls)
2020–2023	Ohio State Buckeyes	63	(18)

Senior career*
Years	Team	Apps	(Gls)
2024	Chicago Fire	0	(0)
2024	→ Indy Eleven (loan)	24	(2)
2025–	Union Omaha	54	(1)
- * Club domestic league appearances and goals as of 15:50, 3 November 2026 (UTC)

Laurence Thomas Wootton (born 10 January 2000) is an English footballer who plays as a midfielder for USL League One club Union Omaha.

== Early life ==
Wootton grew up in Halstead, England, and joined the Stoke City Academy at age six, spending ten years there before joining Welsh club Cardiff City's Academy, where he spent another three years.

== College career ==
In May 2020, he committed to attend Ohio State University in the United States to play for their men's soccer team. On 3 March 2021, he scored his first collegiate goal in a victory over the Michigan State Spartans. At the end of his freshman season, he was named the Big Ten Conference Freshman of the Year. He was also named to the All-Big Ten First Team, the Big Ten All-Freshman Team, and the All-Big Ten Tournament Team.

Ahead of his sophomore season, he was named a team captain. In October 2021, he was named the Big Ten Offensive Player of the Week and was also ranked as the #21 nationally ranked collegiate player. At the end of the season, he was again named to the All-Big Ten First Team, the All-North Region Second Team, First Team All-Ohio, Academic All-Big Ten, and the team's MVP.

During his junior season in 2022, he once again earned Big Ten Offensive Player of the Week in August. At the end of the season, he was named the Big Ten Midfielder of the Year, All-Big Ten First Team, Academic All-Big Ten, and the All-America Third Team.

Ahead of his senior season, he was named to the MAC Hermann Trophy Watch List. At the end of the season, he was once again named the Big Ten Midfielder of the Year and earned his fourth consecutive All-Big Ten First Team honour. He was also named to the All-North Region First Team. He finished his four seasons with Ohio State with 17 goals in 62 matches.

== Club career ==
At the 2024 MLS SuperDraft, Wootton was selected in the third round (64th overall) by Chicago Fire FC. In April 2024, he signed a one-year contract with the club with options for 2025 through 2027, and was immediately sent on loan to the Indy Eleven of the USL Championship for the 2024 season. Wootton made his debut for Indy Eleven on 17 April 2024, in a 1–0 U.S. Open Cup win over Chicago Fire FC II, the MLS Next Pro affiliate team of his parent club. Wootton scored his first professional goal on 5 July 2024, scoring the opening goal for Indy Eleven in a 3–3 draw against Rhode Island FC. He scored his second goal for the club in a 3–2 home victory over Birmingham Legion FC on 19 October. Wootton ended the 2024 season with 2 goals in 28 total appearances, including the club's historic semifinal appearance in the Open Cup. After his loan expired, Chicago declined his option for the 2025 season.

In April 2025, he signed with Union Omaha in USL League One. Wootton made 30 total appearances for Omaha in the 2025 regular season, including 25 League One appearances.

== Career statistics ==
As of match played 25 October 2025.

Appearances and goals by club, season and competition
Club	Season	League			Playoffs		National cup		Other		Total	
Club	Season	Division	Apps	Goals	Apps	Goals	Apps	Goals	Apps	Goals	Apps	Goals
Chicago Fire FC	2024	Major League Soccer	0	0	0	0	—		0	0	0	0
Indy Eleven (loan)	2024	USL Championship	24	2	0	0	4	0	—		28	2
Union Omaha	2025	USL League One	25	0	0	0	1	0	4 (Note: Appearances in USL Cup.)	0	30	0
Career total			49	2	0	0	5	0	4	0	58	2
