= Kempes Tekiela =

German footballer (born 1997)

Personal information
- Full name: Kempes Waldemar Tekiela
- Date of birth: 15 October 1997 (age 29)
- Place of birth: Iserlohn, Germany
- Height: 1.87 m (6 ft 2 in)
- Position: Forward

Team information
- Current team: Union Omaha
- Number: 22

Senior career*
Years	Team	Apps	(Gls)
2017	FC Kray	13	(1)
2017–2018	Westfalia Rhynern	29	(6)
2018–2021	Borussia Dortmund II	10	(1)
2019–2021	→ Progrès Niederkorn (loan)	37	(13)
2021–2022	Esbjerg fB	6	(0)
2022–2023	Union Titus Pétange	36	(20)
2024–2025	One Knoxville	42	(16)
2026–	Union Omaha	24	(5)
- * Club domestic league appearances and goals as of 31 October 2026

Kempes Waldemar Tekiela (born 15 October 1997) is a German professional footballer who plays as a forward for Union Omaha in USL League One.

== Early life ==
Tekiela is a native of Iserlohn, Germany. He is of Polish descent.

== Career ==
In 2019, Tekiela signed for Luxembourgian side Progrès Niederkorn, where he was described as "perhaps slowly establishing himself as the most formidable goalscorer that Niederkorn has had in a long time".

Tekiela joined American USL League One club One Knoxville on 17 January 2024.

In 2026, Tekiela signed for Union Omaha in USL League One.

== Style of play ==
Tekiela mainly operates as a striker and is left-footed.

== Personal life ==
Tekiela has a sister. He has dated Germany's Next Topmodel contestant Elisa Schattenberg.
