= Augustine Williams (footballer) =

Sierra Leonean footballer (born 1997)

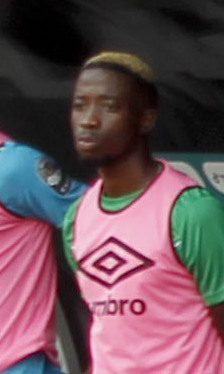
- Williams in 2022

Personal information
- Date of birth: 3 August 1997 (age 29)
- Place of birth: Freetown, Sierra Leone
- Height: 1.88 m (6 ft 2 in)
- Position: Forward

Team information
- Current team: Hartford Athletic

Youth career
- 2015–2016: Nomads SC

Senior career*
Years	Team	Apps	(Gls)
2016–2018	Portland Timbers 2	65	(11)
2017	Portland Timbers	0	(0)
2019–2021	LA Galaxy II	55	(20)
2021	LA Galaxy	7	(0)
2021	→ San Diego Loyal (Loan)	12	(6)
2022–2023	Charleston Battery	63	(29)
2024	Indy Eleven	31	(10)
2025	Pittsburgh Riverhounds	30	(9)
2026–	Hartford Athletic	27	(5)

International career^{‡}
2021–	Sierra Leone	6	(0)
- * Club domestic league appearances and goals as of November 4, 2026 ‡ National team caps and goals as of 17 October 2023

Augustine "Augi" Williams (born 3 August 1997) is a Sierra Leonean professional footballer who plays as a forward for USL Championship club Hartford Athletic and the Sierra Leone national team.

== Club career ==
=== Portland Timbers (2016–2018) ===
Williams joined United Soccer League side Portland Timbers 2 on 3 August 2016. Additionally, he made his debut for the Portland Timbers in a U.S. Open Cup contest against Seattle Sounders FC on 13 June 2017, scoring Portland's lone goal in the 2–1 defeat.

=== LA Galaxy (2019–2021) ===
After two seasons in Portland, Williams joined LA Galaxy II on 28 January 2019. On 30 April 2021, he was promoted to the LA Galaxy senior roster. In August, however, he signed on loan with San Diego Loyal of the USL Championship.

Following the 2021 season, Williams' contract option was declined by the Galaxy.

=== Charleston Battery (2022–2023) ===
On 9 February 2022, Williams signed with USL Championship club Charleston Battery to a two-year contract. Williams scored in his debut for the club, a match-winner against FC Tulsa on 12 March. He scored his 50th career goal in the USL Championship regular season on 12 August in a 1–3 victory over New York Red Bulls II. The striker would lead the team in goals and set a new career-high with 16 goals, along with three assists. He additionally became the Battery's first double-digit goalscorer since 2018. Williams was garnered All-League Second Team honors following the conclusion of the season.

Williams enjoyed success in his second year with the Battery, helping lead their turnaround campaign to reach the 2023 USL Championship Final. He again led the team in scoring with 16 goals across all competitions and added three assists across 38 games. Nine of his goals in 2023 were match-winners. Williams was named to the league's Team of the Week four times and won Player of the Week for Week 6. In the playoffs, Williams scored two goals and one assist, his second proving to be a match-winner to secure the Eastern Conference title. In the title match, Williams scored during the PK shootout as the Battery eventually came up short 2–3 on penalties. He became a free agent following the 2023 season.

=== Indy Eleven (2024) ===
Williams signed with USL Championship side Indy Eleven on 24 January 2024, ahead of the 2024 USL Championship season. He made his debut for the club in a 2–1 away defeat to Oakland Roots on 9 March in the first league game of the season. Williams scored his first goal for Indy Eleven in his home debut on 23 March, in a 1–1 draw against Sacramento Republic.

Williams scored his second goal for the club on 20 April, in a 1–1 draw against Colorado Springs Switchbacks. He scored a brace at Miami FC on 12 May, in a 3–1 league victory.

Williams scored the first goal in the Eleven's 2–1 away win over Major League Soccer club Atlanta United in the Open Cup quarterfinals on 9 July 2024, the team's first-ever victory over an MLS club and a historic win that advanced Williams and the team to a first-ever Open Cup semi-final against Sporting Kansas City.

Williams scored his first hat-trick of his USL Championship career on 28 September 2024 in a 4–0 home victory over Miami FC, becoming only the third Indy Eleven player to record a hat-trick and winning the league Player of the Week award. He scored two goals in the Eleven's next match, a 2–2 draw against Louisville City FC on 5 October, to become the first player in franchise history to score five goals in consecutive games.

On 20 November 2024, the club announced Williams would not return following the conclusion of the 2024 season.

=== Pittsburgh Riverhounds (2025) ===
On 27 January 2025, USL Championship club Pittsburgh Riverhounds announced they had signed Williams to a one-year deal ahead of the 2025 USL Championship season, with an option for an additional year. He made his league debut for the club on 8 March 2025 in a 1–1 away draw against North Carolina FC, scoring Pittsburgh's lone goal.

=== Hartford Athletic (2026-) ===
On 27January 2026, USL Championship club Hartford Athletic announced they had signed Williams to a contract for the 2026 season.

== International career ==
Williams made his debut for Sierra Leone on 15 June 2021 in an Africa Cup of Nations qualifier against Benin. On 30 December 2021, Williams was named to John Keister's final 28-man Sierra Leone squad for the 2021 Africa Cup of Nations. He was called up again for a pair of friendlies in September 2022 against South Africa and the Democratic Republic of the Congo, featuring in both games. Williams started another match on 19 November 2022 against the Algeria A' national football team.

== Honors ==
Charleston Battery

- Eastern Conference Champions (Playoffs): 2023

Pittsburgh Riverhounds

- USL Championship Finals Champions (Playoffs) : 2025

Individual

- USL Championship All-League First Team: 2020
- USL Championship All-League Second Team: 2022
