= American Legion Stadium =

Baseball venue in Odessa, Texas, US

Coordinates: 31.92076°N 102.39538°W

American Legion Stadium is a baseball venue located in Odessa, Texas, and the home of the Odessa College Wranglers baseball team in the Western Junior College Athletic Conference. The facility holds a capacity of 1,000.
