= Dion Acoff =

American soccer player (born 1991)

Personal information
- Full name: Dion Jeremy Acoff
- Date of birth: September 23, 1991 (age 35)
- Place of birth: Fontana, California, U.S.
- Height: 1.75 m (5 ft 9 in)
- Positions: Forward; full-back

Team information
- Current team: Tampa Bay Rowdies
- Number: 26

College career
Years	Team	Apps	(Gls)
2009–2011	Creighton Bluejays	58	(5)
2012	UC Santa Barbara Gauchos	16	(1)

Senior career*
Years	Team	Apps	(Gls)
2015–2016	Þróttur	40	(9)
2017–2019	Valur	32	(6)
2019	SJK	15	(0)
2020	Þróttur	9	(1)
2021	Grindavík	12	(1)
2022–2025	Union Omaha	91	(4)
2026–	Tampa Bay Rowdies	23	(0)
- * Club domestic league appearances and goals as of 00:32, October 26, 2026 (UTC)

Dion Jeremy Acoff (born September 23, 1991) is an American professional soccer player who plays as a right back for the Tampa Bay Rowdies in the USL Championship.

== Early life and education ==
Acoff was born in Fontana, California. He attended Damien High School and was named to the 2009 Parade All-America High School Soccer Team. He attended Creighton University in Omaha, Nebraska where he played for the men's soccer team. Between 2009 and 2011 he appeared in 58 games, scoring 5 goals and assisting on 16 others. Following his junior year, Acoff did not have his scholarship at Creighton renewed.

Acoff looked to return to Southern California and ultimately chose to transfer to the University of California, Santa Barbara. He played in 16 games for the UC Santa Barbara Gauchos men's soccer team for his senior season and scored one goal and three assists.

== Career ==
=== Professional ===
Acoff signed for SJK on February 15, 2019. On October 21, 2019, Acoff was released by SJK following the completion of their season along with eight other players.

On June 1, 2020, Acoff returned to the Icelandic club Knattspyrnufélagið Þróttur.

Acoff signed with Grindavík in March 2021 and reunited with his former Valur assistant coach, Sigurbjörn Örn Hreiðarsson.

Acoff signed with Union Omaha in February 2022, reuniting him with head coach Jay Mims, who coached Acoff while he was an assistant coach at Creighton.

On 8 January 2026, Acoff signed for the Tampa Bay Rowdies in the USL Championship.

== Career statistics ==
=== Club ===
As of match played October 30, 2026

Appearances and goals by club, season and competition
Club	Season	League			National Cup (Note: Appearances in Icelandic Men's Football Cup, Finnish Cup, and U.S. Open Cup)		League Cup		Continental		Other		Total	
Club	Season	Division	Apps	Goals	Apps	Goals	Apps	Goals	Apps	Goals	Apps	Goals	Apps	Goals
Þróttur	2015	1. deild karla	20	7	3	0	–		–		–		23	7
Þróttur	2016	Úrvalsdeild	20	2	2	0	–		–		–		22	2
Þróttur	Total		40	9	5	0	0	0	-	-	-	-	45	9
Valur	2017	Úrvalsdeild	20	2	0	0	0	0	4 (Note: Appearances in UEFA Europa League)	0	1 (Note: Appearance in Icelandic Men's Football Super Cup)	0	25	2
Valur	2018	Úrvalsdeild	12	4	1	1	1 (Note: Appearance in Icelandic Men's Football League Cup)	1	4	0	1	0	19	6
Valur	Total		32	6	1	1	1	1	8	0	2	0	44	8
SJK	2019	Veikkausliiga	15	0	2	0	–		–		–		17	0
Þróttur	2020	1. deild karla	9	1	1	0	–		–		–		10	1
Grindavík	2021	1. deild karla	17	1	0	0	–		–		–		17	1
Union Omaha	2022	USL League One	26	1	4	0	–		–		–		30	1
Union Omaha	2023	USL League One	25	1	1	0	–		–		–		26	1
Union Omaha	2024	USL League One	19	0	3	0	4 (Note: Appearances in USL League One playoffs)	0	–		–		26	0
Union Omaha	2025	USL League One	25	2	2	2	–		–		1 (Note: Appearances in USL Cup)	0	28	4
Union Omaha	Total		95	4	10	2	4	0	0	0	1	0	110	6
Tampa Bay Rowdies	2026	USL Championship	23	0	0	0	1 (Note: Appearances in USL Championship Playoffs)	0	–		2	0	26	0
Career total			231	21	28	3	6	1	8	0	3	0	269	25

== Awards and honors ==
Valur

- Úrvalsdeild: 2017, 2018
- League Cup: 2018
- Icelandic Super Cup: 2017, 2018
