= Charlie Ostrem =

American soccer player (born 1999)

Personal information
- Date of birth: October 12, 1999 (age 27)
- Place of birth: Richmond Beach, Washington, United States
- Height: 5 ft 8 in (1.72 m)
- Position: Left-back

Team information
- Current team: Tampa Bay Rowdies
- Number: 20

Youth career
- Seattle United
- 2015–2018: Washington Crossfire

College career
| Years | Team | Apps | (Gls) |
| 2018–2021 | Washington Huskies | 75 | (4) |

Senior career*
| Years | Team | Apps | (Gls) |
| 2019 | Crossfire Redmond | 8 | (6) |
| 2022–2023 | Chicago Fire II | 37 | (5) |
| 2024 | Western Suburbs | 14 | (3) |
| 2024–2025 | Union Omaha | 39 | (2) |
| 2026– | Tampa Bay Rowdies | 30 | (1) |
- * Club domestic league appearances and goals as of 17:55, 8 November 2026 (UTC)

Charlie Ostrem (born October 12, 1999) is an American professional soccer player who plays as a left-back for the Tampa Bay Rowdies in the USL Championship.

== Early career ==
=== Youth ===
Ostrem attended Shorewood High School, whilst playing club soccer with Seattle United and Washington Crossfire, where he won the State Cup with Seattle and was a two-time Surf Cup champion.

=== College & amateur ===
In 2018, Ostrem attended the University of Washington to play college soccer. In four seasons with the Huskies, Ostrem made 75 appearances, scoring four goals and tallying 22 assists. While at college, Ostrem earned All-American and 2020-21 PAC-12 Defensive Player of the Year honors following a strong junior campaign, and also achieved All PAC-12 First Team recognition.

While at college, Ostrem also appeared for Crossfire Redmond during the NPSL 2019 season, where he netted six times in eight regular season games.

== Professional career ==
=== Chicago Fire II ===
On January 11, 2022, Ostrem was selected 33rd overall in the 2022 MLS SuperDraft by Chicago Fire. He signed with the club's MLS Next Pro side Chicago Fire II on March 9, 2022.

=== Union Omaha ===
After a spell in with Western Suburbs of the New Zealand Central League, Ostrem returned to the United States on July 31, 2024, joining USL League One side Union Omaha. Upon the completion of the 2025 regular season he was awarded with the USL League One Golden Playmaker Award after finishing the season with 10 assists.

=== Tampa Bay Rowdies ===
On 7 January 2026, Ostrem transferred to Tampa Bay Rowdies in the USL Championship.
