= List of Indy Eleven records and statistics =

Indy Eleven are an American professional soccer team based in Indianapolis.

This list encompasses the major records set by the club and their players in both the North American Soccer League (2014–2017) and USL Championship (2018–present).

== Player records ==
=== Appearances ===
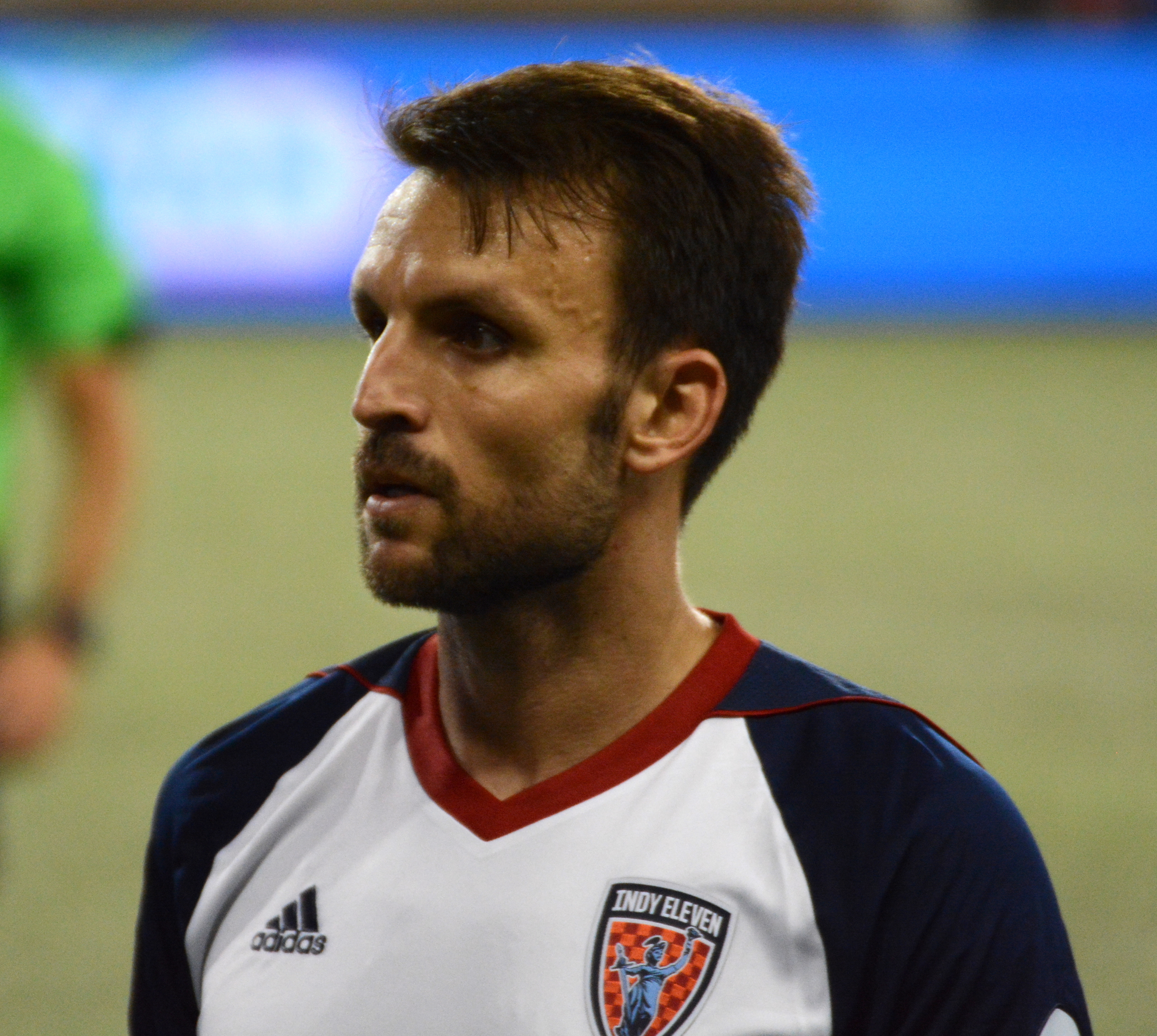
Ayoze Garcia is the club's record holder for games played (126), started (106) and assists (22).

As of April 21, 2026.

Competitive matches only, includes appearances as substitute. Numbers in parentheses indicate goals scored.

	Name	Years	Signed from	League	Playoffs	U.S. Open Cup	USL Cup	Total
1	(Spain) Ayoze Garcia	2018–2022	New York Cosmos	120 (13)	4 (0)	2 (0)	–	**126** (13)
2	(United States) **Cameron Lindley**	**2020, 2023–present**	Orlando City SC, Colorado Springs Switchbacks	106 (2)	1 (0)	10 (0)	5 (0)	**122** (2)
3	(United States) Brad Ring	2014–2018	Portland Timbers	109 (4)	2 (0)	4 (0)	–	**115** (4)
4	(Canada) Karl Ouimette	2018–2022	San Francisco Deltas	100 (7)	4 (1)	4 (0)	–	**108** (8)
5	(Scotland) **Jack Blake**	**2023–present**	San Diego Loyal	90 (25)	1 (0)	8 (2)	5 (1)	**104** (28)
6	(Jamaica) Don Smart	2014–2017	RVA FC	95 (10)	2 (0)	4 (0)	–	**101** (10)
7	(Trinidad and Tobago) Neveal Hackshaw	2019–2022	Charleston Battery	88 (7)	3 (0)	2 (0)	–	**93** (7)
8	(United States) Dylan Mares	2014–2016, 2018	Indiana Hoosiers, Miami FC 2	85 (12)	2 (0)	5 (1)	–	**92** (13)
9	(United States) Marco Franco	2014, 2015–2017	Chicago Fire	82 (0)	2 (0)	4 (0)	–	**88** (0)
10	(United States) **Aodhan Quinn**	**2023–present**	Phoenix Rising	73 (12)	1 (1)	6 (0)	5 (1)	**85** (14)

Bold denotes players still playing for the club.

=== Goals ===
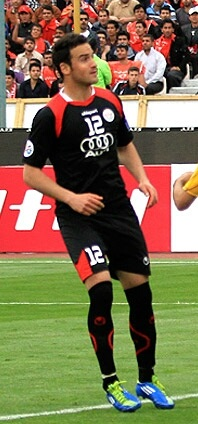
Éamon Zayed scored 27 goals in 63 games during his two years with the club.

As of April 21, 2026.

Competitive matches only. Numbers in parentheses indicate appearances made.

	Name	Years	Signed from	League	Playoffs	U.S. Open Cup	USL Cup	Total
1	(Scotland) **Jack Blake**	**2023–present**	San Diego Loyal	25 (90)	0 (1)	2 (8)	1 (5)	**28** (104)
2	(Libya) Éamon Zayed	2016–2017	Sabah	26 (59)	0 (2)	1 (2)	–	**27** (63)
3	(Canada) Tyler Pasher	2018–2020	Sporting Kansas City	22 (57)	2 (3)	0 (2)	–	**24** (62)
4	(United States) Justin Braun	2016–2018	Sacramento Republic	18 (60)	0 (3)	1 (4)	–	**19** (67)
5	(Uruguay) Sebastián Guenzatti	2023–2024	Tampa Bay Rowdies	16 (62)	0 (1)	0 (6)	–	**16** (69)
6	(Venezuela) Manuel Arteaga	2021–2022	Zamora	15 (53)	0 (0)	0 (0)	–	**15** (53)
7	(United States) **Aodhan Quinn**	**2023–present**	Phoenix Rising	12 (73)	1 (1)	0 (6)	1 (5)	**14** (85)
8	(Sierra Leone) Augustine Williams	2024	Charleston Battery	10 (32)	0 (1)	3 (5)	–	**13** (38)
8	(Brazil) Stéfano Pinho	2022–2023	Austin Bold	13 (50)	0 (1)	0 (1)	–	**13** (52)
8	(Spain) Ayoze García	2018–2022	New York Cosmos	13 (120)	0 (4)	0 (2)	–	**13** (126)
8	(United States) Dylan Mares	2014–2016, 2018	Indiana Hoosiers, Miami FC 2	12 (85)	0 (2)	1 (5)	–	**13** (92)

Bold denotes players still playing for the club.

=== Clean Sheets ===
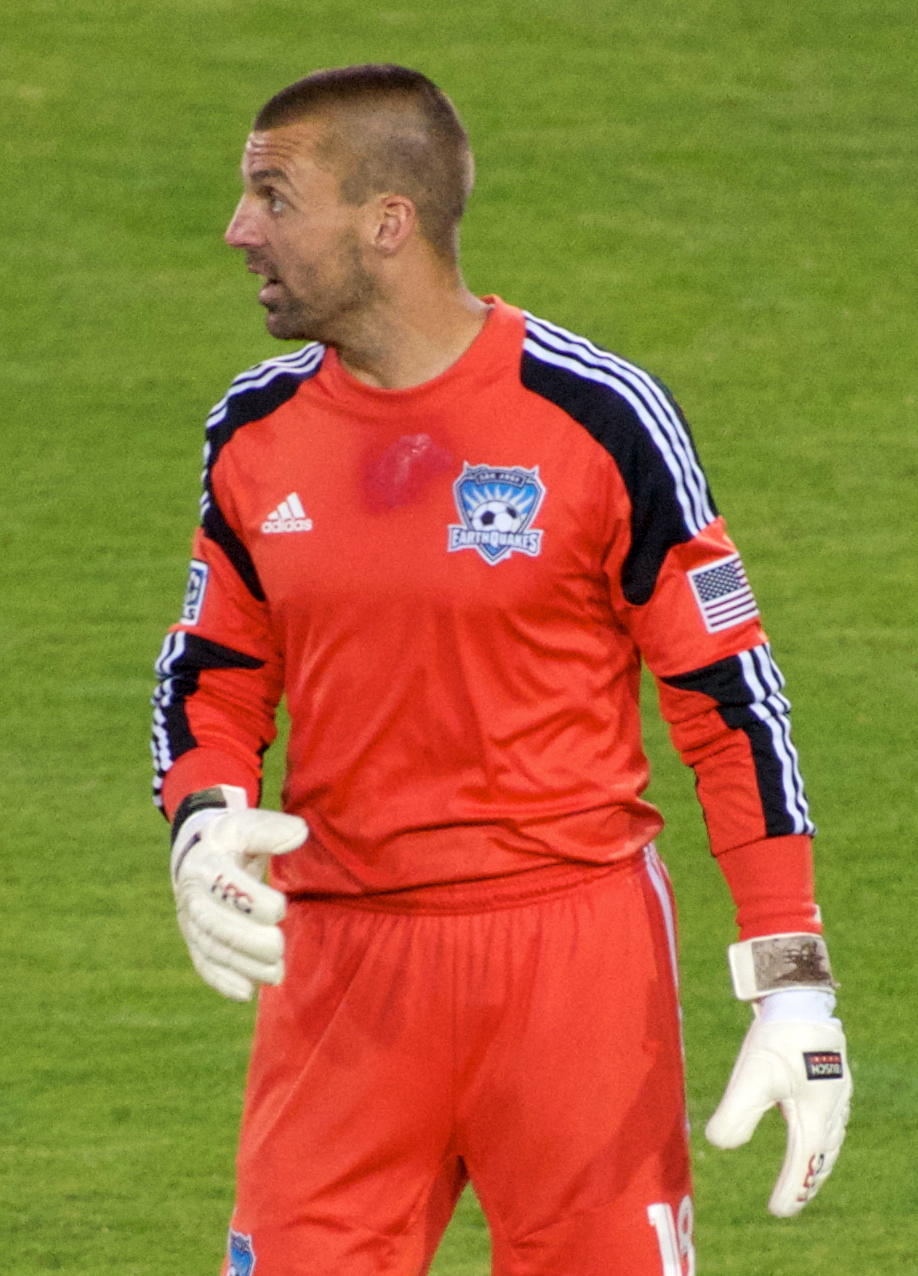
Jon Busch kept a record 19 clean sheets over two seasons with the club.

As of April 21, 2026.

Competitive matches only. Numbers in parentheses indicate appearances made.

	Name	Years	Signed from	League	Playoffs	U.S. Open Cup	USL Cup	Total
1	(United States) Jon Busch	2016–2017	Chicago Fire	17 (59)	2 (2)	0 (1)	–	**19** (62)
2	(United States) Hunter Sulte	2024–2025	Portland Timbers	14 (49)	0 (1)	2 (5)	1 (4)	**17** (59)
3	(United States) Evan Newton	2019–2020	FC Cincinnati	13 (42)	0 (0)	1 (1)	–	**14** (43)
4	(United States) Jordan Farr	2018–2021	Portland Timbers U23	9 (31)	2 (3)	1 (2)	–	**12** (36)
5	(Wales) Owain Fôn Williams	2018	Inverness CT	11 (34)	0 (1)	0 (1)	–	**11** (36)
6	(United States) Tim Trilk	2022–2023	Chattanooga Red Wolves	9 (30)	0 (1)	0 (1)	–	**9** (32)
7	(Germany) Yannik Oettl	2023–2024	New England Revolution II	6 (28)	0 (0)	1 (3)	–	**7** (31)
8	(Germany) Kristian Nicht	2014–2015	Rochester Rhinos	7 (47)	0 (0)	0 (3)	–	**7** (50)
9	**(Grenada) Reice Charles-Cook**	**2025–present**	Welling United FC	1 (4)	0 (0)	2 (4)	1 (1)	**4** (9)
10	(United States) Elliot Panicco	2022	Nashville SC	2 (10)	0 (0)	0 (0)	–	**2** (10)

Bold denotes players still playing for the club.

== Managerial records ==
As of March 19, 2026.

Includes USL Regular Season, USL Playoffs, U.S. Open Cup & USL Cup. Excludes friendlies.

Name	From	To	P	W	D	L	GS	GA	%W	Honors
(United States) Juergen Sommer	June 11, 2013	June 2, 2015	38	8	13	17	49	63	21.05	
(United States) Tim Regan (interim)	June 2, 2015	December 2, 2015	22	7	5	10	26	37	31.82	
(United States) Tim Hankinson	December 2, 2015	November 28, 2017	69	24	24	21	94	89	34.78	(1) NASL Spring Season
(Scotland) Martin Rennie	January 16, 2018	June 16, 2021	99	45	35	19	126	108	45.45	
(England) Mark Lowry	November 16, 2021	November 28, 2023	72	26	15	31	90	102	36.11	
(England) Sean McAuley	January 8, 2024	Present	78	34	17	27	116	110	43.59	

- Notes:

P – Total of played matches W – Won matches D – Drawn matches L – Lost matches GS – Goals scored GA – Goals against
%W – Percentage of matches won
