= Maalique Foster =

Jamaican footballer (born 1996)

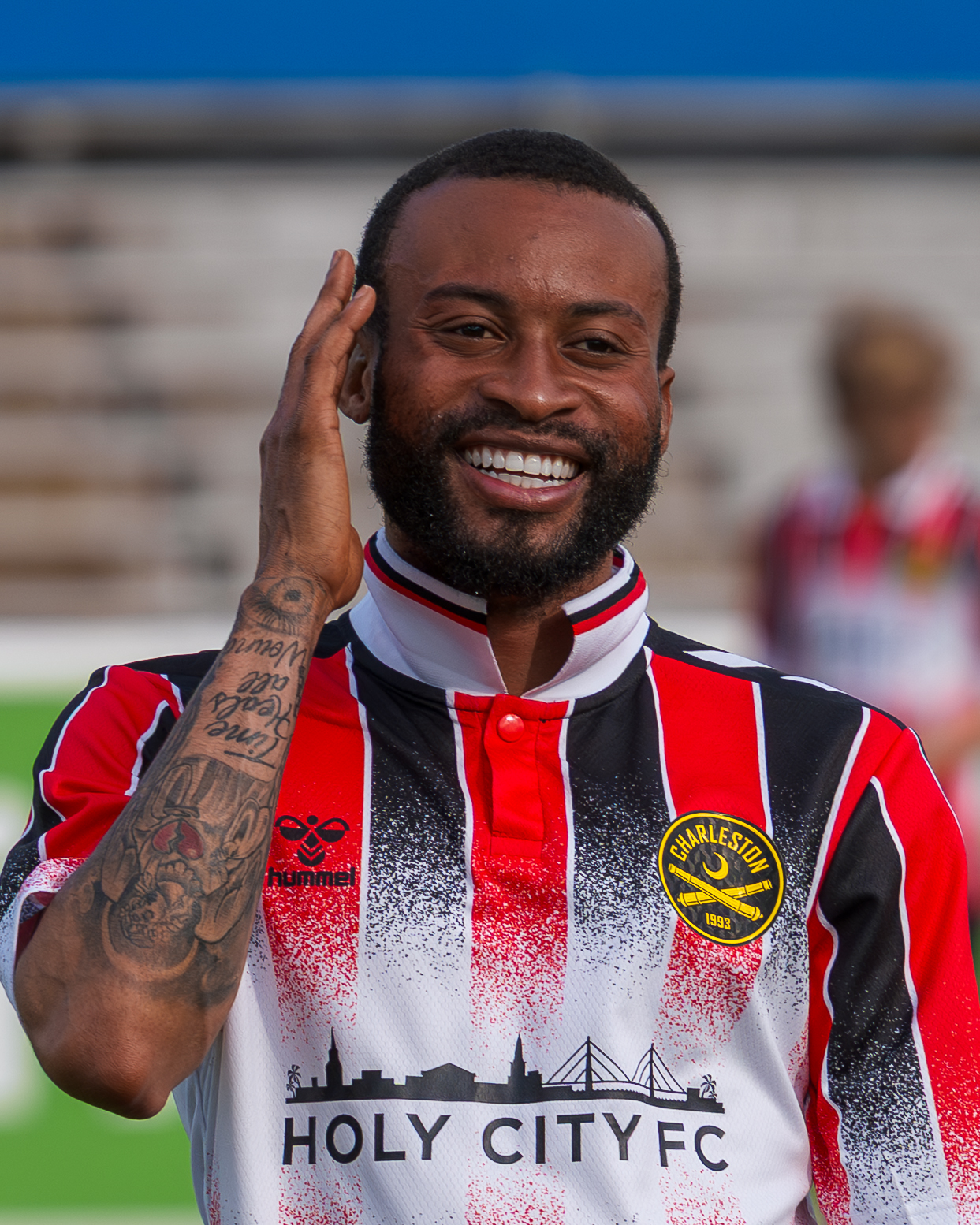
- Foster with the Charleston Battery in 2026

Personal information
- Full name: Maalique Nathanael Foster
- Date of birth: 5 November 1996 (age 29)
- Place of birth: Jamaica
- Height: 1.70 m (5 ft 7 in)
- Position: Winger

Team information
- Current team: Charleston Battery

Senior career*
Years	Team	Apps	(Gls)
2015–2018	Portmore United	70	(14)
2018–2020	Alajuelense	10	(2)
2019	→ Rio Grande Valley FC (loan)	11	(3)
2019–2020	→ Santos de Guápiles (loan)	12	(5)
2020	→ Ironi Kiryat Shmona (loan)	13	(0)
2021–2022	Sacramento Republic	38	(6)
2023–2024	Colorado Springs Switchbacks	53	(8)
2024–2025	Indy Eleven	32	(4)
2026–	Charleston Battery	30	(9)

International career^{‡}
2013	Jamaica U17		
2018–2023	Jamaica	9	(3)
- * Club domestic league appearances and goals as of 12:20, 4 November 2026 (UTC) ‡ National team caps and goals as of 19:24, 7 October 2024 (UTC)

Maalique Nathanael Foster (born 5 November 1996) is a Jamaican footballer who plays as a forward for Charleston Battery in the USL Championship and the Jamaica national football team.

== Career ==
=== Portmore United ===
Foster played for Portmore United in the Jamaican RPSL, before he signed with Alajuelense. Foster won an RSPL title in the 2017–18 season.

=== LD Alajuelense ===
On 1 September 2018, Foster joined Alajuelense in Costa Rica on a season-long loan. Foster scored his first goal for Alajuelense a month later on 28 October.

==== Rio Grande Valley FC (loan) ====
On 27 January 2019, Foster joined USL Championship side Rio Grande Valley FC Toros on loan.

==== Santos de Guápiles (loan) ====
Foster joined Costa Rican side Santos de Guápiles on loan following the end of his spell at Rio Grande Valley.

=== Sacramento Republic ===
On 10 December 2020, Foster moved to USL Championship side Sacramento Republic ahead of their 2021 season. On 28 June 2022, Foster was named USL Championship Player of the Week for Week 16 of the 2022 season, after scoring both goals in a 2–1 victory over Monterey Bay FC.

=== Colorado Springs Switchbacks ===
Ahead of the 2023 season, Foster signed with USL Championship side Colorado Springs Switchbacks.

=== Indy Eleven ===
After two seasons in Colorado Springs, Foster joined fellow USL Championship side Indy Eleven on 23 August 2024, midway through the 2024 season. He made his first appearance for the club the next day on 24 August in a 2–3 away loss to Las Vegas Lights FC, replacing Jack Blake at halftime. Foster scored his first goal for the Indianapolis-based club on 14 September in a 3–1 home win over El Paso Locomotive FC. He ended the season with one goal in 13 appearances, including the club's playoff loss to Rhode Island FC and their historic semifinal appearance in the Open Cup.

On 20 November 2024, Indy Eleven announced that Foster would remain with the club for the 2025 season. Foster scored his second goal for the club on 29 March 2025, in a 2–3 home loss against his former club Colorado Springs Switchbacks. Foster scored his third league goal for the club, and second of the season, on 25 June in a 3–1 loss against Tampa Bay Rowdies. Foster ended the season with 28 appearances and 3 goals in all competitions, exiting the club as a free agent.

=== Charleston Battery ===
In January 2026, Foster joined Charleston Battery for the 2026 USL Championship season.

== International ==
Foster, a naturalized American citizen, represents his home country of Jamaica in international football. He played for the Jamaica U17s in 2013 at the CONCACAF final round in Panama. Foster made his senior team debut on 30 January 2018, in a friendly match against South Korea in Antalya, Turkey. The South Koreans were ahead 2–1 in the game, however, Jamaica pulled level with a distant strike from Maalique Foster, which found the top corner, and scored his inaugural international goal in the 72nd minute of his debut match for Jamaica to end the encounter in a creditable 2–2 draw.

=== International goals ===
Scores and results list Jamaica's goal tally first.

No.	Date	Venue	Opponent	Score	Result	Competition
1.	30 January 2018	Mardan Sports Complex, Antalya, Turkey	South Korea	2–2	2–2	Friendly
2.	15 October 2019	Ergilio Hato Stadium, Willemstad, Curaçao	Aruba	2–0	6–0	2019–20 CONCACAF Nations League B
3.	15 October 2019	Ergilio Hato Stadium, Willemstad, Curaçao	Aruba	6–0	6–0	2019–20 CONCACAF Nations League B

== Honors ==
=== Portmore United F.C. ===
- Jamaica Premier League: 1

2017–18
