= 2025 Indy Eleven season =

Indy Eleven 2025 soccer season

Indy Eleven
2025 season
- Owner: List: Brian Bauer Don Gottwald Shane Hageman Jeffrey Laborsky Fred Merritt Ersal Ozdemir Quinn Ricker Chris Traylor
- Head coach: Sean McAuley
- Stadium: Carroll Stadium
- USL Championship: Eastern Conference: 9th
- USL Playoffs: Did not qualify
- U.S. Open Cup: Round of 32
- USL Cup: Quarterfinals
- Top goalscorer: League: Blake: 10; All: Blake: 11
- Highest home attendance: 10,375 (September 11 vs Birmingham)
- Lowest home attendance: 4,043 (August 20 vs Greenville)
- Average home league attendance: 9,465
- Biggest win: 4–0 (April 26 at Madison)
- Biggest defeat: 1–3, 2–4, 0–2 (April 19 vs Charleston, May 16 at El Paso, June 25 at Tampa Bay, July 18 at North Carolina, August 2 vs Tampa Bay, August 30 vs Louisville, October 4 at Louisville)

The 2025 Indy Eleven season was the most recent season for Indy Eleven, a professional soccer club based in Indianapolis, Indiana. It was the club's twelfth season of existence, their twelfth consecutive season in the second tier of American soccer, and their eighth season in the USL Championship. The team also participated in the U.S. Open Cup for the 10th time and the interleague USL Cup for the first time.

== Background ==
The 2024 season was a historic success for Indy Eleven. The first season under new head coach Sean McAuley, the club finished in 4th place in the USL Championship Eastern Conference, their best league finish since 2019, and clinched their first home playoff game since 2019. The team achieved a club record 12-game unbeaten streak in all competitions from their 1–0 U.S. Open Cup win over Chicago Fire FC II on April 17 to a 1–0 league win over San Antonio FC on June 15. Midfielder Jack Blake and forward Augustine Williams each scored a club-leading 10 league goals, and Williams' 13 total goals were the highest for the team since Éamon Zayed's record 16 goals in 2016.

Indy Eleven reached the semifinals of the 2024 U.S. Open Cup for the first time in their history, defeating Major League Soccer (MLS) side Atlanta United in the process and becoming only the 10th non-MLS side to reach the semifinals since 1996. The victory over Atlanta United also marked the club's first-ever victory over an MLS side in a competitive match.

Indy ended the 2024 season with a conference quarterfinal home loss to eventual finalists Rhode Island FC on November 3, 2024.

== Summary ==
=== Preseason ===
==== Transfers ====
The preseason began for Indy Eleven on November 4, 2024, following their playoff loss to Rhode Island FC. On November 20, the club announced the initial 14 players who would remain for the 2025 season. Notable returnees include 2024 joint-top league goalscorer for the team Jack Blake, who returns for a 3rd consecutive season, 2024 team assist leader Aedan Stanley, and Logan Neidlinger, who became the youngest player in team history to score a goal on August 11, 2024, against New Mexico United. Among those initially not returning for 2025 include goalkeeper Hunter Sulte, who registered 11 assists in 2024 and returned to parent club Portland Timbers, overall 2024 team-leading goalscorer Augustine Williams, and midfielder Tyler Gibson, who has the 9th most appearances in franchise history for the team (79) and joined fellow USL Championship side Oakland Roots on December 3, 2024.

The team made several new player signings prior to the start of the season, including forward Edward Kizza on December 3, defenders Bruno Rendón and Pat Hogan on December 5 and 12, and goalkeeper Antony Siaha on December 10. Siaha departed the club in preseason, joining fellow USL Championship team Hartford Athletic on February 25. Former Detroit City FC forward Elvis Amoh joined the club on January 7. The club added goalkeeper Reice Charles-Cook from English sixth-tier team Welling United F.C. on January 21, and Swedish midfielder Oliver Brynéus was signed from Swedish third-tier team Tvååkers IF on January 23. Veteran defender Adrian Diz Pe departed the club to join Hartford Athletic on January 27, and midfielder James Murphy joined after departing Detroit City on January 29.

On February 4, MLS club Portland Timbers announced that goalkeeper Hunter Sulte would return to Indy for a second consecutive season. Scottish defender Finn McRobb joined the club on February 7, having previously played for MLS Next Pro side Minnesota United FC 2.

Defender Brian Schaefer joined the team on loan from FC Cincinnati 2 on September 3, 2025. Indy signed an additional defender on September 8, when Joey Zalinsky joined on loan from St. Louis City SC for the remainder of the season. Goalkeeper Luke Pruter joined the team's roster on September 10, on loan from Columbus Crew 2.

==== Preseason friendlies ====
On January 16, fellow USL Championship club Pittsburgh Riverhounds SC announced a preseason friendly against Indy Eleven, scheduled to take place on February 12 at Grand Park Sports Campus in Westfield. The remainder of the club's preseason games were announced on January 12. The team faced MLS Next Pro side Columbus Crew II on January 31 and will also play Chicago Fire II, FC Cincinnati 2, and USL League One club Forward Madison FC.

Indy Eleven's preseason matches began with a 1–1 draw away to MLS Next Pro side Columbus Crew SC II on January 31, followed by a 1–2 loss at home the Pittsburgh Riverhounds on February 12 and a 0–3 away victory behind closed doors against Chicago Fire II. The Eleven followed up with a 5–0 home victory over Forward Madison FC on February 21 and a 3–1 home win over FC Cincinnati 2.

=== Regular season ===
The 2025 USL Championship schedule was released on December 19, 2024.

==== March ====
Indy Eleven began their regular season with a 1–3 away victory against Miami FC on March 15. Midfielder Jack Blake scored the first competitive goal for the season in the 3rd minute, a successful penalty kick conversion following a foul against defender James Musa in the Miami box. Blake's goal was his seventh consecutive converted penalty. The opening goal was followed by an outside-the-box strike from captain Aodhan Quinn to double the lead in the 18th before debutant Patrick Hogan scored in the 35th minute. Miami's Kevin Hoyos scored a consolation goal in the 65th minute. Both Blake and Hogan earned a spot in the USL Championship Team of the Week for Week 2 following their performance.

Indy continued their road campaign on March 22 against league debutants Lexington SC. Following a cagey first half, defender Bruno Rendón scored the opening goal in the 60th minute after gathering the ball off a deflected cross from Jack Blake. Lexington midfielder Marcus Epps would equalize in the 79th minute. The inaugural match between the two clubs ended in a 1–1 draw.

Indy had their first home match on March 29 against 2024 USL Championship playoffs champions Colorado Springs Switchbacks FC. Indy opened the scoring in the 19th minute with Maalique Foster controlling a deflected cross from Aodhan Quinn and shooting into the net from the edge of the box. Colorado Springs would pull ahead with a double from Marco Micaletto on either side of halftime before Justin Dhillon scored to pull ahead by 2. Quinn would score in stoppage time via a direct free kick to cut the gap, but Indy would go on to lose their first match of the season 2–3. Three former Boys in Blue featured for Colorado Springs: Jonas Fjeldberg, Duke Lacroix and Juan Tejada.

==== April ====
April began with a 2–2 home league draw against North Carolina FC on April 5. For the fourth consecutive match, Indy Eleven scored first via an own goal after North Carolina midfielder Raheem Somersall deflected a corner kick from Aedan Stanley into the net in the 26th minute. Indy would pull further ahead immediately after the break, with forward Edward Kizza scored his first goal for the club in the 48th minute. North Carolina pulled a goal back after Evan Conway scored in the 51st minute and finally equalized in the closing seconds of the match, as defender Conor Donovan headed the ball home off of a free kick.

Indy's league match at Hartford, originally scheduled for April 12, was postponed prior to the match due to an unplayable field condition and rescheduled for September 3.

The first non-league competitive match of the season was an Open Cup match at home against Miami FC on April 16, which ended in a 1–0 victory for Indy in added time. Defender Hayden White scored the only goal of the match following an Indy corner.

Indy's second home game of the month was on April 19 against fellow Eastern Conference club Charleston Battery. Charleston forward MD Myers scored twice within the first 10 minutes to give the visitors an early 2–0 lead. Arturo Rodriguez scored shortly after the half to put Charleston up by three. Indy striker Elvis Amoh scored a consolation goal in the 94th minute, his first goal with the club, to end the match as a 1–3 loss.

Indy then traveled to face USL League One side Forward Madison FC on April 26 for the team's debut match in the USL Cup. Following a tepid first half at Breese Stevens Field in Madison, Indy broke the deadlock with quick pair of goals from Aodhan Quinn and Jack Blake before Elvis Amoh scored a brace in the final 9 minutes of the match to give Indy an 0–4 away victory.

==== May ====
Like the previous month, May began with Indy Eleven drawing 2–2 with Eastern Conference rivals Detroit City FC on May 3. Following two early goal from Detroit's Connor Rutz and Darren Smith, Elvis Amoh scored on either side of halftime in his first start of the season to grab a point for the Boys in Blue.

Indy then travelled to Pennsylvania to face Major League Soccer side Philadelphia Union in the Round of 32 in the U.S. Open Cup on May 7. Indy held the MLS side to a 1–1 draw in regulation and added time thanks to a goal from Elvis Amoh and failed to advance following a 5–4 penalty shootout loss.

Indy travelled to California to take on Sacramento Republic in the league, ending in a 1–1 draw. Indy's Elvis Amoh scored in the 36th minute to put the team in the lead, but the team failed to hold on to the game, conceding a penalty in the 96th minute to draw the match.

The Eleven were on the road for a third straight match on May 16, traveling to face Western Conference side El Paso Locomotive FC. The team fell to three goals from Amando Moreno, Eric Calvillo and Frank Daroma before Edward Kizza pulled one back in the 85th minute.

Indy's fourth consecutive road match took place on May 24 against USL League One side One Knoxville SC. A lone goal by Elvis Amoh at the start of the second half resulted in a 0–1 victory for the Eleven, as well as extending their undefeated streak in the USL Cup.

Back home in Indianapolis on May 28, Indy Eleven faced Eastern Conference side Hartford Athletic in the league. The match ended in a 4–4 draw thanks to two goals from Romario Williams and a goal each from Ben Ofeimu and Jack Blake. The draw meant Indy remained winless in the league at home.

==== June ====
June began for Indy Eleven with a league away match against Birmingham Legion. Indy scored in the 4th minute of the match with a 25-yard outside-the-box shot from Cam Lindley following a deflection by Jack Blake. The match ended in a 0–1 victory for the Eleven, the team's first league victory since their opening day win over Miami FC on March 15.

On June 14, Indy won their first home league match of the season with a 1–0 win over the Pittsburgh Riverhounds, thanks to a strike from Jack Blake in first half stoppage time.

Following two successive 1–0 victories, Indy Eleven hosted Western Conference side Las Vegas Lights on June 21. The match ended in a close-fought 0–1 defeat for the Eleven, despite having more shots on target and a larger amount of possession throughout. This marked the first game in any competition all season where Indy was held scoreless.

Indy's next game was a midweek home match at the Tampa Bay Rowdies on June 25. Following a thunderstorm delay and a late start, Indy went ahead via an outside-the-box volley from Maalique Foster in first half stoppage time, only to fall behind in the second half following goals from Tampa Bay players Blake Bodily, Laurence Wyke and former Indy player Nick Moon to end in a 3–1 loss.

==== July ====
Indy began July with a decisive 3–0 home victory against Monterey Bay on July 5, thanks to goals from Aodhan Quinn, Jack Blake and Romario Williams.

Continuing an upturn in form, Indy hosted 2024 USL Championship playoffs finalists Rhode Island FC on July 12. Indy won 1–0 off of a team goal with contributions from Cam Lindley and Aodhan Quinn that was finally scored by Romario Williams.

Following two quick home victories, Indy sat above the playoff line as they travelled to visit North Carolina FC on July 18. The reverse fixture ended in a 2–2 draw in Indianapolis on April 5. North Carolina scored early in the first half, and Indy midfielder James Murphy scored his first goal for the club to equalize in the 43rd minute. The game got away from Indy in the second half with North Carolina scoring three additional goals. Jack Blake scored a consolation penalty in the 93rd minute, bringing his total league season goals to 5 and ending the match in a 2–4 defeat.

Indy returned to cup play in the USL Cup when they hosted FC Tulsa on July 26, earning a 2–1 victory that resulted in the team topping their group and advancing to the quarterfinals.

==== August ====
Following a July with three victories and only one defeat, Indy returned to league play on August 2 against the Tampa Bay Rowdies. Indy fell behind early after striker Woobens Pacius scored in the 12th minute but equalized before halftime thanks to a headed goal from Ben Ofeimu. Tampa Bay pulled ahead in the second half with two goals to defeat the Eleven 1–3.

Indy's first August away match came against Detroit City FC on August 9. Indy went down a player early following a 30th minute red card shown against Bruno Rendón, and fell behind after the ball was deflected into the net by a James Musa own goal in the 57th minute. Indy lost the match 0–1, the team's first ever loss to Detroit City in four total meetings.

The Eleven fell to a fourth straight league defeat on August 16, in a 3–2 away loss to Loudoun United FC. Despite goals from James Musa and Elvis Amoh keeping the team in the lead until the 82nd minute, a pair of goals from Loudoun pushed Indy below the playoff line.

On August 20, Indy were eliminated from USL Cup competition in the quarterfinals following a 1–1 home draw and 5–6 penalty shootout home loss to USL League One side Greenville Triumph SC.

Following a difficult start to the month, Indy resumed league play on August 23 at home against Miami FC. Despite falling behind early thanks to a goal from Miami's Francisco Bonfiglio, a brace from Jack Blake and goal from Patrick Hogan led Indy to a 3–2 home victory, the team's first league win since a 1–0 victory over Rhode Island FC on July 12.

Indy ended August with a home defeat in the LIPAFC rivalry, falling 1–3 to Louisville City despite scoring in the game's 2nd minute.

==== September ====
Following a difficult August with one victory, four defeats and a penalty shootout loss in the USL Cup, Indy began September strong with a 0–2 away victory against Hartford Athletic on September 3. Leading goalscorer Jack Blake scored in the 3rd minute, with Maalique Foster's strike in the 76th minute sealing the win.

Indy continued their campaign on the road on September 6, falling 2–1 to the Charleston Battery. Battery striker Cal Jennings scored a brace before Jack Blake pulled a goal back in the 72nd minute from a corner kick routine.

Indy Eleven lost a second straight away match on the 16th, falling 0–1 to 2024 USL Championship playoff finalists Rhode Island FC thanks to an own goal from James Musa.

Indy began the final games of the regular season with a hard-fought 2–1 home victory over Birmingham Legion FC on September 21. Despite falling behind in the first half from a Peter-Lee Vassell free kick, Edward Kizza and Ben Ofeimu both scored within six minutes to pull out a win and keep Indy in the hunt for a playoff spot.

Indy continued their form with a second straight victory on September 27 against Western Conference leaders FC Tulsa, the Eleven's first back-to-back league victory since July. Jack Blake's goal in the 68th minute made him the team leader in USL Championship goals (25) and moved the Eleven back into a playoff position.

==== October ====
Indy Eleven entered the final month of the USL Championship regular season in the final playoff spot in the Eastern Conference, only to drop down into 9th place following their 0–2 away loss to Louisville City FC on October 4.

The team's slide continued with a 1–2 away loss at Pittsburgh Riverhounds on October 11. Indy fell behind by two goals, with James Musa scoring in the 88th minute to pull one back. The loss kept the Eleven in 9th place in the Eastern Conference, three points behind Detroit City FC in the final playoff qualifying position.

With Indy needing to win both of their final two games for an opportunity to qualify for the playoffs, Indy pulled out a 2–1 win against Loudoun United on October 18 in their final home game of the season, thanks to a brace from Bruno Rendón.

The final regular season game for Indy Eleven took place on October 25 away against Western Conference side Orange County SC, with the Eleven needing a victory along with Detroit City failing to defeat the Tampa Bay Rowdies to make the playoffs. Detroit's 1–1 draw left Indy with an opportunity to seal the final playoff position in the Eastern Conference. The Eleven fell behind early following a strike from defender Vuk Latinovich but equalized 13 minutes later after a Romario Williams header following a corner. With the match tied until the 91st minute, Orange County midfielder Ousmane Sylla scored to eliminate Indy Eleven from playoff contention and end their season.

Aodhan Quinn's 11th assist of the season won him the Golden Playmaker award for the USL Championship's assist leader throughout the regular season, becoming the first player in league history to notch double-digit assists in a season three separate times.

== Roster ==
As of October 27, 2025

No.	Name	Nationality	Position(s)	Date of birth (age)	Signed in	Previous club	League Apps.	League Goals
Goalkeepers
0	Hunter Sulte	(United States)	GK	April 25, 2002 (age 23)	2024, 2025	(United States) Portland Timbers	49	0
23	Reice Charles-Cook	(Grenada)	GK	April 8, 1994 (age 32)	2025	(England) Welling United F.C.	4	0
31	Luke Pruter	(United States)	GK	September 3, 2001 (age 24)	2025	(United States) Columbus Crew 2	4	0
44	Ryan Hunsucker (Note: USL Academy Signing)	(United States)	GK	July 29, 2007 (age 18)	2025	(United States) Indy Eleven Academy	0	0
Defenders
2	Josh O'Brien	(Republic of Ireland)	DF	February 7, 2003 (age 23)	2024	(Scotland) Hamilton Academical	46	1
3	Patrick Hogan	(United States)	DF	September 17, 1997 (age 28)	2024	(United States) Pittsburgh Riverhounds	19	2
4	Finn McRobb	(Scotland)	DF	January 30, 2002 (age 24)	2025	(United States) Minnesota United FC 2	10	0
12	Brian Schaefer	(United States)	DF	April 17, 2002 (age 24)	2025	(United States) FC Cincinnati 2	9	1
16	Aedan Stanley	(United States)	DF	December 13, 1999 (age 26)	2024	(United States) Miami FC	40	0
27	Bruno Rendón	(Cuba)	DF	May 7, 2000 (age 25)	2024	(United States) Northern Colorado Hailstorm	26	3
30	Ben Ofeimu	(United States)	DF	September 30, 2000 (age 25)	2024	(United States) Miami FC	53	4
33	Hayden White	(England)	DF	April 15, 1995 (age 31)	2024	(England) Ebbsfleet United	23	0
41	James Musa	(New Zealand)	DF	April 1, 1992 (age 34)	2024	(United States) Colorado Springs Switchbacks	36	3
55	Maverick McCoy (Note: USL Academy Signing)	(United States)	DF	July 24, 2007 (age 18)	2024	(United States) Indy Eleven Academy	0	0
71	Joey Zalinsky	(United States)	DF	January 3, 2003 (age 23)	2025	(United States) St. Louis City SC	7	0
Midfielders
5	James Murphy	(United States)	MF	September 17, 1997 (age 28)	2025	(United States) Detroit City FC	30	1
6	Cameron Lindley	(United States)	MF	July 18, 1997 (age 28)	2020, 2023	(United States) Colorado Springs Switchbacks	100	2
8	Jack Blake	(Scotland)	MF	September 22, 1994 (age 31)	2023	(United States) San Diego Loyal	87	22
14	Aodhan Quinn	(United States)	MF	March 22, 1992 (age 34)	2023	(United States) Phoenix Rising	67	12
17	Logan Neidlinger	(United States)	MF	September 6, 2005 (age 20)	2024	(United States) Indy Eleven Academy	22	1
21	Oliver Brynéus	(Sweden)	MF	September 5, 1998 (age 27)	2025	(Sweden) Tvååkers IF	13	0
32	Brem Soumaoro	(Liberia)	MF	August 8, 1996 (age 29)	2024	(Canada) York United FC	15	0
Forwards
9	Romario Williams	(Jamaica)	FW	August 15, 1994 (age 31)	2024	(United States) Hartford Athletic	39	8
18	Elliot Collier	(New Zealand)	FW	February 22, 1995 (age 31)	2024	(United States) San Diego Loyal	60	6
19	Edward Kizza	(Uganda)	FW	December 17, 1998 (age 27)	2024	(United States) Pittsburgh Riverhounds	28	3
22	Elvis Amoh	(Ghana)	FW	February 2, 1992 (age 34)	2025	(United States) Detroit City FC	27	5
99	Maalique Foster	(Jamaica)	FW	November 5, 1996 (age 29)	2024	(United States) Colorado Springs Switchbacks	32	4

== Transfers ==
=== In ===
No.	Pos.	Player	Transferred from	Fee/notes	Date	Source
Preseason transfers
19	FW	(Uganda) Edward Kizza	Pittsburgh Riverhounds	Free transfer	12/3/24	
27	DF	(Cuba) Bruno Rendón	Northern Colorado Hailstorm FC	Undisclosed	12/5/24	
–	GK	(Cameroon) Antony Siaha	Monterey Bay FC	Undisclosed	12/10/24	
3	DF	(United States) Patrick Hogan	Pittsburgh Riverhounds	Free transfer	12/12/24	
22	FW	(Ghana) Elvis Amoh	Detroit City FC	Free transfer	1/7/25	
23	GK	(Grenada) Reice Charles-Cook	Welling United F.C.	Undisclosed	1/21/25	
21	MF	(Sweden) Oliver Brynéus	Tvååkers IF	Free transfer	1/23/25	
5	MF	(United States) James Murphy	Detroit City FC	Free transfer	1/29/25	
44	GK	(United States) Ryan Hunsucker	-	Academy signing	1/30/25	
0	GK	(United States) Hunter Sulte	Portland Timbers	Loan	2/4/25	
4	DF	(Scotland) Finn McRobb	Minnesota United FC 2	Free Transfer	2/7/25	
12	DF	(United States) Brian Schaefer	FC Cincinnati 2	Loan	9/3/25	
71	DF	(United States) Joey Zalinsky	St. Louis City SC	Loan	9/8/25	
31	GK	(United States) Luke Pruter	Columbus Crew 2	Loan	9/10/25	

=== Out ===
No.	Pos.	Player	Transferred to	Fee/notes	Date	Source
Preseason transfers
–	GK	(Cameroon) Antony Siaha	Hartford Athletic	Mutual contract termination	2/25/25	
0	GK	(United States) Hunter Sulte	Portland Timbers	End of loan	11/4/24	
1	GK	(Germany) Yannik Oettl	-	Released	11/20/24	
5	DF	(England) Callum Chapman-Page	-	Released	11/20/24	
7	FW	(United States) Karsen Henderlong	FC Naples	Released	1/10/25	
9	FW	(Sierra Leone) Augustine Williams	Pittsburgh Riverhounds	Released	1/27/25	
12	MF	(United States) Diego Sanchez	-	Released	11/20/24	
13	FW	(Uruguay) Sebastián Guenzatti	Detroit City FC	Released	3/7/25	
15	DF	(Cuba) Adrián Diz Pe	Hartford Athletic	Undisclosed	1/27/25	
16	MF	(England) Laurence Wootton	Chicago Fire	End of loan	11/4/24	
20	MF	(United States) Ben Mines	Loudoun United FC	Released	11/20/24	
22	MF	(United States) Tyler Gibson	Oakland Roots	Free transfer	12/3/24	
42	FW	(Honduras) Douglas Martinez	Charleston Battery	Free transfer	12/23/24	
44	DF	(England) Macauley King	-	Released	11/20/24	

== Non-competitive ==
=== Preseason ===
January 31, 2025 Friendly	Columbus Crew 2	1–1	Indy Eleven	Columbus, OH
2:00 PM EST	Unknown	Report	Kizza

February 12, 2025 Friendly	Indy Eleven	1–2	Pittsburgh Riverhounds SC	Westfield, IN
1:00 PM EST	Amoh pen' (28)	Report	Larsen 78', 84'	Stadium: Grand Park Sports Complex

February 15, 2025 Friendly	Chicago Fire FC II	0–3	Indy Eleven	Bridgeview, IL
		Report	Rendón; Williams; Kizza

February 21, 2025 Friendly	Indy Eleven	5–0	Forward Madison FC	Westfield, IN
11:00 AM EST	Blake 16'; Williams 56', 81'; Brynéus 62'; Unknown 86' (o.g.)	Report		Stadium: Grand Park Sports Complex

March 2, 2025 Friendly	Indy Eleven	3–1	FC Cincinnati 2	Indianapolis, IN
5:00 PM EST	Foster 13'; Neidlinger 43'; Brynéus 87'	Report	Opeymi 5'	Stadium: Carroll Stadium

== Competitive ==
=== USL Championship ===
==== Standings ====
Pos	Team	Pld	W	L	T	GF	GA	GD	Pts	Qualification
1	Louisville City FC (S)	30	22	1	7	56	19	+37	73	Playoffs
2	Charleston Battery	30	19	6	5	62	32	+30	62	Playoffs
3	North Carolina FC	30	13	11	6	40	39	+1	45	Playoffs
4	Pittsburgh Riverhounds SC (C)	30	12	10	8	32	28	+4	44 (Note: Pittsburgh Riverhounds SC are ahead of Hartford Athletic on head-to-head points. PGH 6, HFD 0.)	Playoffs
5	Hartford Athletic	30	13	12	5	48	36	+12	44	Playoffs
6	Loudoun United FC	30	12	12	6	45	48	−3	42	Playoffs
7	Rhode Island FC	30	10	12	8	29	28	+1	38	Playoffs
8	Detroit City FC	30	9	11	10	33	35	−2	37	Playoffs
9	Indy Eleven	30	10	15	5	44	52	−8	35	
10	Tampa Bay Rowdies	30	9	14	7	43	50	−7	34	
11	Miami FC	30	8	16	6	29	44	−15	30	
12	Birmingham Legion FC	30	5	13	12	36	50	−14	27	

Source: USL Championship Standings
Rules for classification: 1) head-to-head points; 2) head-to-head goal differential; 3) points-per-game within conference; 4) total wins; 5) total goal differential; 6) total goals scored; 7) points earned against top four Conference finishers; 8) disciplinary points; 9) coin toss or drawing of lots
(C) Champions; (S) Players' Shield winner

==== Match results ====
The league announced the 34 week regular season schedule for every club on December 19, 2024. Indy began their season away to Eastern Conference side Miami FC on March 15 with their home opener taking place on week 3 against 2024 champion Colorado Springs Switchbacks on March 29. The regular season concluded with an away game against Orange County Soccer Club on October 25. The Eleven faced expansion club Lexington SC for the first time in a competitive match on March 22.

The regular season consisted of 30 matches, with the Eleven playing home and away against each Eastern Conference opponent. They also played 8 matches against Western conference opponents, 4 at home and 4 away. The additional 4 matches in the season were made up by group stage games in the USL Cup.

March 15 1	Miami FC	1–3	Indy Eleven	Miami, FL
6:30 PM EST	Hoyos 65'; Celeste (yellow card) 68'; Romero (yellow card) 90+1'	Report	Blake 3' (pen.); Quinn 18'; Hogan 35'	Stadium: Pitbull Stadium; Attendance: 1,027; Referee: Elvis Osmanovic

March 22 2	Lexington SC	1–1	Indy Eleven	Lexington, KY
7:00 PM EST	Beer (yellow card) 28'; Djeffal (yellow card) 36'; Burks (yellow card) 62'; Epps 79'; Sargeant (yellow card) 90+5'	Report	Kizza (yellow card) 24'; Musa (yellow card) 45+1'; Rendón 60'	Stadium: Lexington SC Stadium; Attendance: 4,299; Referee: Luis Arroyo

March 29 3	Indy Eleven	2–3	Colorado Springs Switchbacks	Indianapolis, IN
7:00 PM EST	Foster 19'; Murphy (yellow card) 53'; Quinn 90+8'	Report	Adams (yellow card) 7'; Micaletto 43', 62'; Ward (yellow card) 59'; Dhillon 64'; Romero (yellow card) 90+5'	Stadium: Carroll Stadium; Attendance: 10,202; Referee: Joshua Encarnación

April 5 4	Indy Eleven	2–2	North Carolina FC	Indianapolis, IN
7:00 PM EST	Murphy (yellow card) 6'; Musa (yellow card) 8'; Somersall 26' (o.g.); Kizza 48'; Quinn (yellow card) 89'	Report	Mentzingen (yellow card) 13'; Somersall (yellow card) 45'; Conway 51'; Craig (yellow card) 81'; Servania (yellow card) 83'; Donovan 90+3'	Stadium: Carroll Stadium; Attendance: 7,017; Referee: Edson Carvajal

April 19 6	Indy Eleven	1–3	Charleston Battery	Indianapolis, IN
7:00 PM EST	Blake (yellow card) 28'; Rendón (yellow card) 43'; White (yellow card) 66'; Amoh 90+4'	Report	Myers 4', 8'; Rodríguez 49'; Zamudio (yellow card) 90+4'	Stadium: Carroll Stadium; Attendance: 10,080; Referee: Natalie Simon

May 3 7	Indy Eleven	2–2	Detroit City	Indianapolis, IN
7:00 PM EST	Amoh 27', 66'; White (yellow card) 32' (yellow-red card) 60'; Musa (yellow card) 55'; Quinn (yellow card) 64'	Report	Rutz 2'; Williams (yellow card) 4'; Smith 15'; Yamazaki (yellow card) 58'; Chapman (yellow card) 65'; Bryant (yellow card) 72'; Amoo-Mensah (yellow card) 85'	Stadium: Carroll Stadium; Attendance: 9,738; Referee: Elijio Arreguin

May 10 8	Sacramento Republic	1–1	Indy Eleven	Sacramento, CA
10:00 PM EST	Timmer (yellow card) 17'; Parano (yellow card) 33'; Amann 90+6' (pen.)	Report	O'Brien (yellow card) 20'; Amoh 36'; Musa (yellow card) 58'	Stadium: Heart Health Park; Attendance: 9,358; Referee: Benjamin Meyer

May 16 9	El Paso Locomotive	3–1	Indy Eleven	El Paso, TX
9:00 PM EST	Moreno 13'; Calvillo 32'; Ruiz (yellow card) 42'; Diaz (yellow card) 65'; Daroma 82'	Report	Blake (yellow card) 29'; Foster (yellow card) 36'; Hogan (yellow card) 47'; Kizza 85'	Stadium: Southwest University Park; Attendance: 5,077; Referee: Greg Dopka

May 28 10	Indy Eleven	4–4	Hartford Athletic	Indianapolis, Indiana
7:00 PM EST	Ofeimu 13'; McRobb (yellow card) 35'; Williams 45+2', 90+3'; Blake 46'; Ofeimu (yellow card) 90+7'	Report	Edwards 26' (pen.), 32'; Scarlett 42'; Dieng 46'	Stadium: Carroll Stadium; Attendance: 9,056; Referee: Joshua Encarnación

Jun 4 11	Birmingham Legion	0–1	Indy Eleven	Birmingham, AL
8:00 PM EST	Centeno (yellow card) 16'; Damus (yellow card) 70'; Hernandez-Foster (yellow card) 75'; Torres (yellow card) 76'	Report	Lindley 4'; Musa (yellow card) 27'; O'Brien (yellow card) 90+1'; Murphy (yellow card) 90+4'	Stadium: Protective Stadium; Attendance: 4,332; Referee: Elton Garcia

June 14 12	Indy Eleven	1–0	Pittsburgh Riverhounds	Indianapolis, IN
7:00 PM EST	Blake 45+2'	Report		Stadium: Carroll Stadium; Attendance: 9,207; Referee: Alyssa Nichols

June 21 13	Indy Eleven	0–1	Las Vegas Lights	Indianapolis, IN
7:00 PM EST		Report	Nigro (yellow card) 2'; Pickering 90'	Stadium: Carroll Stadium; Attendance: 9,132; Referee: John Griggs

June 25 14	Tampa Bay Rowdies	3–1	Indy Eleven	St. Petersburg, FL
9:00 PM EST	Arteaga (penalty missed) 54'; Guillén (yellow card) 55'; Bodily 60'; Moon 69'; Wyke 90+3'; Pacius (yellow card) 90+5'	Report	Kizza (yellow card) 43'; Foster 45+1', (yellow card) 66'; Rendón (yellow card) 45+4'; Hogan (yellow card) 68'; Lindley (yellow card) 82'	Stadium: Al Lang Stadium; Attendance: 3,692; Referee: Jeremy Scheer

July 5 15	Indy Eleven	3–0	Monterey Bay	Indianapolis, IN
7:30 PM EST	Quinn 8'; Blake 45+11' (p); Williams 83'	Report	Muir (yellow card) 60'	Stadium: Carroll Stadium; Attendance: 9,169; Referee: Natalie Simon

July 12 16	Indy Eleven	1–0	Rhode Island FC	Indianapolis, IN
7:00 PM EST	Williams 55'; White (yellow card) 75'; Collier (yellow card) 88'; Sulte (yellow card) 90+5'	Report	Shapiro-Thompson (yellow card) 24'; Yao (yellow card) 51'; Williams (yellow card) 90+1'	Stadium: Carroll Stadium; Attendance: 9,039; Referee: Mark Verso

July 18 17	North Carolina FC	4–2	Indy Eleven	Cary, NC
7:30 PM EST	Mentzingen (yellow card) 16', (goal) 20'; Servania 48'; Conway 55'; Martin (yellow card) 58'; Dolabella 73'	Report	Rendón (yellow card) 18'; Blake (yellow card) 41', (goal) 90+3'; Murphy 43'	Stadium: WakeMed Soccer Park; Attendance: 2,383; Referee: Joshua Encarnación

August 2 18	Indy Eleven	1–3	Tampa Bay Rowdies	Indianapolis, IN
7:00 PM EST	Ofeimu 44'; Musa (yellow card) 75'; Murphy (yellow card) 80'; Foster (yellow card) 90+10'	Report	Pacius 12', (yellow card) 72'; Moon (yellow card) 38'; Álvarez 57'; Skinner 90+8'	Stadium: Carroll Stadium; Attendance: 9,107; Referee: Abdou Ndiaye

August 9 19	Detroit City	1–0	Indy Eleven	Hamtramck, MI
7:00 PM EST	Bryant (yellow card) 36'; Musa 57' (o.g.)	Report	Rendón (red card) 30'; Charles-Cook (yellow card) 88'	Stadium: Keyworth Stadium; Attendance: 6,317; Referee: Matthew Corrigan

August 16 20	Loudoun United	3–2	Indy Eleven	Leesburg, VA
7:00 PM EST	Awuah (yellow card) 43'; Ordóñez 63', (yellow card) 74', (goal) 86'; Ryan 82'	Report	Williams (yellow card) 38'; Musa 51'; Amoh 78', (yellow card) 90+3'	Stadium: Segra Field; Attendance: 2,413; Referee: Atahan Yaya

August 23 21	Indy Eleven	3−2	Miami FC	Indianapolis, IN
7:00 PM EST	Murphy (yellow card) 28'; Ofeimu (yellow card) 35'; Blake 45+1' (p), 69'; Hogan 51'; Quinn (yellow card) 85'	Report	Bonfiglio 21', (yellow card) 72'; Romero (yellow card) 39'; Knutson (yellow card) 77'; Hoyos 90+1'; Campisi (yellow card) 90+6'	Stadium: Carroll Stadium; Attendance: 9,942; Referee: Carlos Rodriguez

August 30 22	Indy Eleven	1–3	Louisville City	Indianapolis, IN
7:00 PM EST	Williams 2'; Foster (yellow card) 74'	Report	McFadden 45'; Lambert 49', (yellow card) 65'; Totsch 56'	Stadium: Carroll Stadium; Attendance: 10,230; Referee: Greg Dopka

September 3 5	Hartford Athletic	0–2	Indy Eleven	Hartford, CT
7:30 PM EST	Siaha (yellow card) 65'	Report	Blake 3'; Foster 76'; Williams (yellow card) 77'	Stadium: Trinity Health Stadium; Attendance: 4,966; Referee: Matthew Thompson

September 6 23	Charleston Battery	2–1	Indy Eleven	Mount Pleasant, SC
7:30 PM EST	Jennings 38' (p), 67'; Myers (yellow card) 45+4'; Ycaza (yellow card) 57'	Report	McRobb (yellow card) 30'; Murphy (yellow card) 38'; Schaefer (yellow card) 65'; Foster (yellow card) 70'; Blake 72'	Stadium: Patriots Point Soccer Complex; Attendance: 5,012; Referee: Nabil Bensalah

September 13 24	Rhode Island FC	1–0	Indy Eleven	Pawtucket, RI
4:30 PM EST	Herivaux (yellow card) 23'; Fuson (yellow card) 54'; Musa 64' (o.g.); Mabika (red card) 88'	Report	Ofeimu (yellow card) 19'; Musa (yellow card) 45+2'; Amoh (red card) 90+2'	Stadium: Tidewater Landing Stadium; Attendance: 8,498; Referee: Rodrigo Albuquerque

September 21 25	Indy Eleven	2–1	Birmingham Legion	Indianapolis, IN
5:00 PM EST	Kizza 54'; Ofeimu 60'	Report	Vassell 12'; Travis (yellow card) 33'; Turnbull (yellow card) 90+3'	Stadium: Carroll Stadium; Attendance: 10,375; Referee: Alyssa Pennington

September 27 26	Indy Eleven	2–1	FC Tulsa	Indianapolis, IN
7:00 PM EST	Schaefer 8'; Murphy (yellow card) 45+1'; Zalinsky (yellow card) 51'; Blake 68'; Pruter (yellow card) 88'; Lindley (yellow card) 90+2'	Report	St Clair (yellow card) 33'; Diallo 80'; Dalou (yellow card) 89'	Stadium: Carroll Stadium; Attendance: 9,512; Referee: John Mato

October 4 27	Louisville City	2–0	Indy Eleven	Louisville, KY
7:30 PM EST	Dia 36'; Davila 58'; Perez (yellow card) 63'; Las (red card) 72'	Report		Stadium: Lynn Family Stadium; Attendance: 9,785; Referee: Servando Berna Rico

October 11 28	Pittsburgh Riverhounds	2–1	Indy Eleven	Pittsburgh, PA
7:00 PM EST	Griffin 38'; Suber 76'; Barnes (yellow card) 86'	Report	Schaefer (yellow card) 18'; Lindley (yellow card) 63'; Musa 88'	Stadium: Highmark Stadium; Attendance: 5,618; Referee: Muhammad Kaleia

October 18 29	Indy Eleven	2–1	Loudoun United	Indianapolis, Indiana
8:00 PM EST	Rendón 11', 54'; Murphy (yellow card) 44'	Report	Bidois (yellow card) 26'; Skundrich (yellow card) 34'; Lindley 65' (o.g.); Awuah (yellow card) 70'	Stadium: Carroll Stadium; Attendance: 10,163; Referee: Brandon Stevis

October 25 30	Orange County SC	2–1	Indy Eleven	Irvine, CA
10:00 PM EST	Latinovich 23', (yellow card) 80'; Sylla 90+1'	Report	Williams 36', (yellow card) 45+3'; Blake (yellow card) 48'; Ofeimu (yellow card) 72'	Stadium: Championship Soccer Stadium; Attendance: 5,000; Referee: Elvis Osmanovic

==== USL Championship Playoffs ====
The top eight teams in each USL Championship conference advanced to the 2025 USL Championship playoffs following the conclusion of the regular season.

=== U.S. Open Cup ===
As a member of the USL Championship, Indy Eleven participated in the U.S. Open Cup tournament for the 10th time, following their semi-final appearance in 2024. All 23 other USL Championship teams also participated, as well as 14 USL League One teams, 16 MLS teams, 10 MLS Next Pro teams, and 32 amateur teams from USL League Two, National Premier Soccer League, and open division qualifying. The format for the 2025 U.S. Open Cup was released on January 28, 2025, with Indy Eleven entering as hosts in the third round. The third round draw took place on April 3, 2025, with Indy Eleven hosting fellow USL Championship team Miami FC on April 16. Miami FC entered the tournament in the first round, defeating amateur team Naples United FC and MLS Next Pro side Inter Miami CF II prior to facing Indy, who won the match following a 123rd-minute goal from Hayden White.

Indy travelled to face MLS side Philadelphia Union in the Round of 32 on May 7, with the winner playing the winner of the match between Pittsburgh Riverhounds and New York City FC. Indy held Philadelphia to a 1–1 draw through regulation time and 30 minutes of extra time, advancing to penalties where Philadelphia advanced 5–4. Indy goalkeeper Reice Charles-Cook made 10 total saves to limit the first division side to only one goal.

==== Match results ====
April 16 3rd round	Indy Eleven (Indiana)	1–0 (a.e.t.)	(Florida) Miami FC	Indianapolis, IN
7:30 PM EST	Neidlinger (yellow card) 5'; Soumaoro (yellow card) 27'; Ofeimu (yellow card) 61'; White 120+3'	Report	Gavilanes (yellow card) 41'; Cardona (yellow card) 42'; Knutson (yellow card) 51'	Stadium: Carroll Stadium; Attendance: 4,366; Referee: Calin Radosav

May 7 Round of 32	Philadelphia Union (Pennsylvania)	1–1 (a.e.t.) (5–4 p)	(Indiana) Indy Eleven	Chester, PA
7:30 PM EST	Bedoya 6'; Vazquez (yellow card) 55'; Makhanya (yellow card) 88'	Report	Amoh 48'; Murphy (yellow card) 69'; Ofeimu (yellow card) 90+1'; Stanley (yellow card) 90+2'	Stadium: Subaru Park; Attendance: 8,633; Referee: Matthew Corrigan
	Penalties
	Vassilev (penalty scored); Baribo (penalty scored); Westfield (penalty scored); Rafanello (penalty scored); Lukić (penalty scored)		(penalty scored) Williams; (penalty scored) Blake; (penalty missed) Quinn; (penalty scored) Lindley; (penalty scored) Stanley

=== USL Cup ===
The 2025 edition of the USL Cup is a professional soccer tournament held between teams in USL Championship and USL League One. Teams are split into six groups of six to seven teams; each team will play two teams in their group at home, and two others away. The teams winning their group, along with the two teams that scored the most goals among those that did not win their group, will move to a single-elimination knockout round.

The group stage of the USL cup is played from April 26 to the weekend of July 26. Teams are divided into six regional groups and play two regional opponents at home and the other two away. Indy Eleven was placed into Group 3, competing against fellow USL Championship sides Birmingham Legion and FC Tulsa as well as USL League One clubs Chattanooga Red Wolves, Forward Madison, and One Knoxville. The winner of the group stage in each group will advance to the knockout stage with several runners-up qualifying via a wild card.

Indy's first group stage match, an away game against Forward Madison FC, resulted in an 0–4 victory. Indy followed up with a second victory on May 24 against One Knoxville and a penalty shootout win against Birmingham Legion on June 28. Indy concluded the group stage with a 2–1 home victory over FC Tulsa, successfully advancing with an undefeated record to the quarterfinals of the tournament in their first appearance.

Indy next faced USL League One side Greenville Triumph SC on August 20. Despite scoring early in the second half and leading until the final minute of regular time, Indy conceded an own goal following a deflection from Aodhan Quinn. With the match level after regular time the teams advanced to penalties, where Greenville goalkeeper Gunther Rankenburg made the deciding save against Oliver Brynéus to eliminate Indy from the competition.

==== Group stage ====
Pos	Lg	Team	Pld	W	PKW	PKL	L	GF	GA	GD	Pts	Qualification
1	USLC	Indy Eleven	4	3	1	0	0	8	2	+6	11	Advance to knockout stage
2	USLC	Birmingham Legion FC	4	3	0	1	0	8	4	+4	10	Advance to knockout stage (wild card)
3	USL1	Chattanooga Red Wolves SC	4	1	1	0	2	4	8	−4	5	
4	USLC	FC Tulsa	4	1	0	1	2	8	7	+1	4	
5	USL1	Forward Madison FC	4	1	0	1	2	3	7	−4	4	
6	USL1	One Knoxville SC	4	0	1	0	3	2	5	−3	2	

Updated to match(es) played on July 26, 2025. Source: USL

==== Match results ====
April 26 Matchday 1	Forward Madison (Wisconsin)	0–4	(Indiana) Indy Eleven	Madison, WI
7:00 PM EST	Murphy (yellow card) 59'; Sousa (yellow card) 70'	Report	Rendón (yellow card) 20'; Murphy (yellow card) 50'; Quinn (yellow card) 50', (goal) 69'; Blake 72'; Amoh 84', 90+3'; Musa (yellow card) 90+3'	Stadium: Breese Stevens Field; Attendance: 3,748; Referee: Muhammad Hassan

May 24 Matchday 2	One Knoxville (Tennessee)	0–1	(Indiana) Indy Eleven	Knoxville, TN
7:00 PM EST	Skelton (yellow card) 80' (yellow-red card) 90+1'	Report	White (yellow card) 6'; Amoh 47'; Blake (yellow card) 78'; Lindley (yellow card) 90+3'	Stadium: Covenant Health Park; Referee: Muhammad Kaleia

Jun 28 Matchday 3	Indy Eleven (Indiana)	1–1 (7–6 p)	(Alabama) Birmingham Legion	Indianapolis, IN
7:00 PM EST	O'Brien 28', (yellow card) 50'; Musa (yellow card) 69'; Murphy (yellow card) 88'	Report	Preston 90+4'; Pasher (yellow card) 90+6'	Stadium: Carroll Stadium; Attendance: 9,028; Referee: Brad Jensen
	Penalties
	Williams (penalty missed); Blake (penalty scored); Lindley (penalty scored); Quinn (penalty scored); McRobb (penalty scored); Rendón (penalty scored); Collier (penalty scored); O'Brien (penalty scored)		(penalty scored) Pasher; (penalty scored) Laszo; (penalty scored) Hernandez-Foster; (penalty scored) Preston; (penalty missed) Damus; (penalty scored) Suárez; (penalty scored) McIllhatton; (penalty missed) Centeno

July 26 Matchday 4	Indy Eleven (Indiana)	2–1	(Oklahoma) FC Tulsa	Indianapolis, IN
7:00 PM EST	Ofeimu (yellow card) 33'; Williams 38'; Batista 51' (o.g.); Murphy (yellow card) 73'; Rendón (yellow card) 90+5'	Report	Seagrist (yellow card) 7'; Batista (yellow card) 35'; Colli 72'; Stauffer (yellow card) 90+1'	Stadium: Carroll Stadium; Attendance: 9,065; Referee: Gerald Flores

August 20 Quarterfinals	Indy Eleven (Indiana)	1–1 (5–6 p)	(South Carolina) Greenville Triumph	Indianapolis, IN
7:00 PM EST	Blake (yellow card) 12'; Williams 55'; Foster (yellow card) 68'; Ofeimu (yellow card) 76'	Report	Evans (yellow card) 21'; Quinn 90' (o.g.)	Stadium: Carroll Stadium; Attendance: 4,043; Referee: Elvis Osmanovic
	Penalties
	Foster (penalty scored); Amoh (penalty scored); Hogan (penalty scored); Ofeimu (penalty scored); Quinn (penalty scored); Brynéus (penalty missed)		(penalty scored) Evans; (penalty scored) Fricke; (penalty scored) Herrera; (penalty scored) Zakowski; (penalty scored) Patti; (penalty scored) Soto

== Season statistics ==
=== Appearances and goals ===
As of October 13, 2025.

No.	Pos	Nat	Player	Total		USLC		U.S. Open Cup		USL Cup	
No.	Pos	Nat	Player	Apps	Goals	Apps	Goals	Apps	Goals	Apps	Goals
0	GK	(United States) USA	Hunter Sulte	28	0	23	0	1	0	4	0
2	DF	(Republic of Ireland) IRL	Josh O'Brien	28	1	21	0	2	0	5	1
3	DF	(United States) USA	Patrick Hogan	22	2	19	2	1	0	2	0
4	DF	(Scotland) SCO	Finn McRobb	13	0	10	0	1	0	2	0
5	MF	(United States) USA	James Murphy	36	1	30	1	1	0	5	0
6	MF	(United States) USA	Cam Lindley	33	1	26	1	2	0	5	0
8	MF	(Scotland) SCO	Jack Blake	36	10	30	9	1	0	5	1
9	FW	(Jamaica) JAM	Romario Williams	26	8	21	6	1	0	4	2
12	DF	(United States) USA	Brian Schaefer	9	1	9	1	0	0	0	0
14	MF	(United States) USA	Aodhan Quinn	34	4	28	3	1	0	5	1
16	DF	(United States) USA	Aedan Stanley	11	0	8	0	2	0	1	0
17	MF	(United States) USA	Logan Neidlinger	9	0	7	0	1	0	1	0
18	FW	(New Zealand) NZL	Elliot Collier	24	0	18	0	2	0	4	0
19	FW	(Uganda) UGA	Edward Kizza	33	3	28	3	1	0	4	0
21	MF	(Sweden) SWE	Oliver Brynéus	15	0	12	0	1	0	2	0
22	FW	(Ghana) GHA	Elvis Amoh	33	9	27	5	2	1	4	3
23	GK	(Grenada) GRN	Reice Charles-Cook	7	0	4	0	2	0	1	0
27	DF	(Cuba) CUB	Bruno Rendón	33	3	26	3	2	0	5	0
30	DF	(United States) USA	Ben Ofeimu	32	3	26	3	2	0	4	0
31	GK	(United States) USA	Luke Pruter	4	0	4	0	0	0	0	0
32	MF	(Liberia) LBR	Brem Soumaoro	10	0	7	0	1	0	2	0
33	DF	(England) ENG	Hayden White	22	1	17	0	2	1	3	0
41	DF	(New Zealand) NZL	James Musa	35	2	29	2	1	0	5	0
44	GK	(United States) USA	Ryan Hunsucker	0	0	0	0	0	0	0	0
55	DF	(United States) USA	Maverick McCoy	0	0	0	0	0	0	0	0
71	DF	(United States) USA	Joey Zalinsky	7	0	7	0	0	0	0	0
99	FW	(Jamaica) JAM	Maalique Foster	28	3	21	3	2	0	5	0

- Source: Indy stats

=== Disciplinary record ===
No.	Pos.	Name	USLC		Playoffs		Open Cup		USL Cup		Total	
No.	Pos.	Name	Booked	Sent off (straight red)	Booked	Sent off (straight red)	Booked	Sent off (straight red)	Booked	Sent off (straight red)	Booked	Sent off (straight red)
0	GK	(United States) Hunter Sulte	1	0	0	0	0	0	0	0	1	0
2	DF	(Republic of Ireland) Josh O'Brien	2	0	0	0	0	0	1	0	3	0
3	DF	(United States) Patrick Hogan	2	0	0	0	0	0	0	0	2	0
4	DF	(Scotland) Finn McRobb	2	0	0	0	0	0	0	0	2	0
5	MF	(United States) James Murphy	8	0	0	0	1	0	3	0	12	0
6	MF	(United States) Cameron Lindley	3	0	0	0	0	0	1	0	4	0
8	MF	(Scotland) Jack Blake	4	0	0	0	0	0	2	0	6	0
9	FW	(Jamaica) Romario Williams	3	0	0	0	0	0	0	0	3	0
12	DF	(United States) Brian Schaefer	2	0	0	0	0	0	0	0	2	0
14	MF	(United States) Aodhan Quinn	3	0	0	0	0	0	1	0	4	0
15	DF	(Cuba) Adrián Diz Pe	0	0	0	0	0	0	0	0	0	0
16	DF	(United States) Aedan Stanley	0	0	0	0	1	0	0	0	1	0
17	MF	(United States) Logan Neidlinger	0	0	0	0	1	0	0	0	1	0
18	FW	(New Zealand) Elliot Collier	1	0	0	0	0	0	0	0	1	0
19	FW	(Uganda) Edward Kizza	2	0	0	0	0	0	0	0	2	0
21	MF	(Sweden) Oliver Brynéus	0	0	0	0	0	0	0	0	0	0
22	FW	(Ghana) Elvis Amoh	1	1	0	0	0	0	0	0	1	1
23	GK	(Grenada) Reice Charles-Cook	1	0	0	0	0	0	0	0	1	0
27	DF	(Cuba) Bruno Rendón	3	1	0	0	0	0	2	0	5	1
30	DF	(United States) Ben Ofeimu	4	0	0	0	2	0	2	0	8	0
31	GK	(United States) Luke Pruter	1	0	0	0	0	0	0	0	1	0
32	MF	(Liberia) Brem Soumaoro	0	0	0	0	1	0	0	0	1	0
33	DF	(England) Hayden White	3	1	0	0	0	0	1	0	4	1
41	DF	(New Zealand) James Musa	7	0	0	0	0	0	2	0	9	0
44	GK	(United States) Ryan Hunsucker	0	0	0	0	0	0	0	0	0	0
55	DF	(United States) Maverick McCoy	0	0	0	0	0	0	0	0	0	0
71	DF	(United States) Joey Zalinsky	1	0	0	0	0	0	0	0	1	0
99	FW	(Jamaica) Maalique Foster	5	0	0	0	0	0	1	0	6	0

Source: Indy Stats

=== Clean sheets ===
No.	Name	USLC	Playoffs	Open Cup	USL Cup	Total	Games Played
0	(United States) Hunter Sulte	5	0	0	1	6	28
23	(Grenada) Reice Charles-Cook	1	0	1	1	3	7
31	(United States) Luke Pruter	0	0	0	0	0	4
44	(United States) Ryan Hunsucker	0	0	0	0	0	0

Source: Indy stats

=== Goals ===
Rank	Name	USLC	Playoffs	Open Cup	USL Cup	Total	Games Played
1	(Scotland) Jack Blake	10	0	0	1	11	36
2	(Ghana) Elvis Amoh	5	0	1	3	9	33
3	(Jamaica) Romario Williams	6	0	0	2	8	26
4	(United States) Aodhan Quinn	3	0	0	1	4	34
T–5	(Jamaica) Maalique Foster	3	0	0	0	3	28
T–5	(United States) Ben Ofeimu	3	0	0	0	3	32
T–5	(Uganda) Edward Kizza	3	0	0	0	3	33
T–5	(Cuba) Bruno Rendón	3	0	0	0	3	33
T–9	(United States) Patrick Hogan	2	0	0	0	2	21
T–9	(New Zealand) James Musa	2	0	0	0	2	35
T–11	(United States) Brian Schaefer	1	0	0	0	1	9
T–11	(England) Hayden White	0	0	1	0	1	22
T–11	(Republic of Ireland) Josh O'Brien	0	0	0	1	1	28
T–11	(United States) Cameron Lindley	1	0	1	0	1	33
T–11	(United States) James Murphy	1	0	0	0	1	36

Source: Indy stats

== Awards ==
=== Weekly awards ===
USL Championship Team of the Week Selections
Week	Starters		Bench		Opponent(s)	Link
2	(Scotland) Jack Blake	(United States) Patrick Hogan	–	–	Miami	
3	(Cuba) Bruno Rendón	–	–	–	Lexington	
4	–	–	(Jamaica) Maalique Foster	–	Colorado Springs	
5	(Jamaica) Maalique Foster	–	–	–	North Carolina	
8/9	(Ghana) Elvis Amoh	–	–	–	Detroit	
13/14	(United States) Hunter Sulte	(Jamaica) Romario Williams	–	–	Hartford, Birmingham	
15	(United States) Ben Ofeimu	–	–	–	Pittsburgh	
17/18	(Scotland) Jack Blake (Player of the Week)		(United States) Aodhan Quinn	–	Tampa Bay, Monterey Bay	
25	(Scotland) Jack Blake	–	–	–	Miami	
27	(Scotland) Jack Blake	–	(United States) Hunter Sulte	–	Hartford, Charleston	
29	(United States) Brian Schaefer	–	(United States) Ben Ofeimu	(United States) Aodhan Quinn	Birmingham	
30	–	–	(United States) Brian Schaefer	–	Tulsa	
33	(Cuba) Bruno Rendón	–	–	–	Loudoun	

USL Championship Save of the Week
Week	Player	Opponent	Link
27	(United States) Hunter Sulte	Charleston	
33	(United States) Hunter Sulte	Loudoun	

USL Cup Team of the Week Selections
Round	Starter	Bench	Opponent	Link
1	(Scotland) Jack Blake	(Ghana) Elvis Amoh	Madison	
3	–	(United States) Hunter Sulte	Birmingham	

=== Season awards ===
- USL Championship 2025 Golden Playmaker: Aodhan Quinn

== Kits ==
Type	Shirt	Shorts	Socks	First appearance / Record (W–D–L)
Home	Blue	Blue	Blue	March 29 v. Colorado Springs / 7–4–8
Away	Red	Blue/Red	Blue/Red	March 16 a. Miami FC / 5–2–6
Third	Black	Black	Black	April 19 v. Charleston / 1–1–1

== See also ==
- Indy Eleven
- List of Indy Eleven seasons
- 2025 in American soccer
- 2025 USL Championship season
