= List of Indy Eleven seasons =

Since its inaugural season in 2014, the American soccer club Indy Eleven, has competed in the second division of American soccer. The team currently competes in the USL Championship after spending its first four years in the defunct North American Soccer League. The following list covers each season of the club's existence, documenting its performance in all competitive competitions.

== Key ==
Key to competitions

- USL Championship (USLC) – The second division of soccer in the United States, established in 2010 and previously known as USL and USL Pro. The Championship was the third division of American soccer from its founding until its elevation to second division status in 2017.
- North American Soccer League (NASL) – The second division of soccer in the United States from 2011 through 2017, now defunct.
- U.S. Open Cup (USOC) – The premier knockout cup competition in US soccer, first contested in 1914.
- CONCACAF Champions League (CCL) – The premier competition in North American soccer since 1962. It went by the name of Champions' Cup until 2008.

Key to colors and symbols

1st or W	Winners
2nd or RU	Runners-up
Last	Wooden Spoon
♦	League Golden Boot
	Highest average attendance

Key to league record

- Season = The year and article of the season
- Div = Level on pyramid
- League = League name
- Pld = Games played
- W = Games won
- L = Games lost
- D = Games drawn
- GF = Goals scored
- GA = Goals against
- Pts = Points
- PPG = Points per game
- Conf = Conference position
- Overall = League position

Key to cup record

- DNE = Did not enter
- DNQ = Did not qualify
- NH = Competition not held or canceled
- QR = Qualifying round
- PR = Preliminary round
- GS = Group stage
- R1 = First round
- R2 = Second round
- R3 = Third round
- R4 = Fourth round
- R5 = Fifth round
- QF = Quarterfinals
- SF = Semifinals
- RU = Runners-up
- W = Winners

== Seasons ==
Season	League											Position		Playoffs	USL Cup	USOC	Continental / Other	Average attendance	Top goalscorer(s)	
Season	Div	League	Pld	W	L	D	GF	GA	GD	Pts	PPG	Conf.	Overall	Playoffs	USL Cup	USOC	Continental / Other	Average attendance	Name	Goals
2014	2	NASL	27	6	12	9	35	46	–11	27	1.00	N/A	9th	DNQ	Ineligible	R4	Ineligible	10,465	(Brazil) Kléberson	8
2015	2	NASL	30	8	13	9	36	48	–12	33	1.10	N/A	9th	DNQ	Ineligible	R3	DNQ	9,809	(United States) Dylan Mares	6
2016	2	NASL	32	15	7	10	51	33	+18	55	1.72	N/A	2nd	RU	Ineligible	R4	DNQ	8,396	(Libya) Éamon Zayed	15
2017	2	NASL	32	7	13	12	39	56	–17	33	1.03	N/A	6th	DNQ	Ineligible	R2	DNQ	8,395	(Libya) Éamon Zayed	11
2018	2	USL	34	13	11	10	45	42	+3	49	1.44	7th	16th	R1	Ineligible	R2	DNQ	10,163	(United States) Jack McInerney	10
2019	2	USLC	34	19	9	6	48	29	+19	63	1.85	3rd	4th	SF	Ineligible	R3	DNQ	10,734	(Canada) Tyler Pasher	11
2020	2	USLC	16	7	7	2	21	19	+2	23	1.44	9th	18th	DNQ	Ineligible	NH	DNQ	5,167	(Canada) Tyler Pasher	10
2021	2	USLC	32	9	15	8	32	47	–15	35	1.09	12th	25th	DNQ	Ineligible	NH	DNQ	N/A	(Venezuela) Manuel Arteaga	10
2022	2	USLC	34	12	17	5	41	55	–14	41	1.21	9th	19th	DNQ	Ineligible	R2	DNQ	8,285	(Brazil) Stefano Pinho	11
2023	2	USLC	34	13	11	10	46	38	+5	49	1.44	6th	11th	R1	Ineligible	R3	DNQ	9,709	(Uruguay) Sebastián Guenzatti	11
2024	2	USLC	34	14	11	9	49	50	–1	51	1.50	4th	7th	R1	Ineligible	SF	DNQ	9,795	(Sierra Leone) Augustine Williams	13
2025	2	USLC	30	10	15	5	44	52	–8	35	1.16	9th	18th	DNQ	QF	R32	DNQ	9,465	(Scotland) Jack Blake	11
Total	–	–	369	133	141	95	487	516	–29	494	1.34	–	–	–	–	–	–	–	(Libya) Éamon Zayed	26

1. Avg. attendance only includes statistics from regular season matches.
2. Top goalscorer(s) includes all goals scored in the regular season play, playoffs, U.S. Open Cup, USL Cup and other competitive matches.
