= Brian Schaefer =

American soccer player (born 2002)

Personal information
- Date of birth: April 17, 2002 (age 24)
- Place of birth: Seattle, Washington, US
- Height: 6 ft 3 in (1.91 m)
- Position: Defender

Team information
- Current team: Tampa Bay Rowdies
- Number: 3

Youth career
- Jacksonville Armada

College career
Years	Team	Apps	(Gls)
2020–2023	South Florida Bulls	53	(5)

Senior career*
Years	Team	Apps	(Gls)
2021	Jacksonville Armada U-23		
2022	Tampa Bay United	3	(0)
2023	St. Petersburg FC		
2024–	FC Cincinnati 2	47	(5)
2025	→ Indy Eleven (loan)	9	(1)
2026–	→ Tampa Bay Rowdies (loan)	17	(0)
- * Club domestic league appearances and goals as of 17:55, 8 November 2026 (UTC)

Brian Schaefer (born April 17, 2002) is an American professional soccer player who plays as a defender for Tampa Bay Rowdies.

== Early life ==
Schaefer played youth soccer with the Jacksonville Armada. Schaefer attended Fletcher High School and won the Gateway Conference championship in 2020 and was named the Player of the Year.

== College career ==
In 2020, Schaefer began attending the University of South Florida, where he played for the men's soccer team. On March 6, 2021, he scored the winning goal in a 2–1 victory over the Tulsa Golden Hurricane, for his first career collegiate goal, subsequently being named to the American Athletic Conference Weekly Honor Roll. At the end of his freshman season, he was named to the AAC All-Freshman Team. In 2022, he was named to the All-ACC Second Team and an Academic All-District selection.

== Club career ==
In 2021, he played with the Jacksonville Armada U-23 in the National Premier Soccer League.

In 2022, Schaefer played with Tampa Bay United in USL League Two. In 2023, he played with St. Petersburg FC in USL League Two.

At the 2024 MLS SuperDraft, Schaefer was selected in the first round (27th overall) by FC Cincinnati. After participating in training camp with the first team, he signed a professional contract with the second team, FC Cincinnati 2 of MLS Next Pro, in February. He made his debut on March 17 against Chicago Fire FC II. He scored his first goal on June 15 against Carolina Core FC.

Schaefer scored his first goal of the 2025 MLS Next Pro season on April 20, 2025, in a 3–1 home victory over the New York Red Bulls II.

Schaefer joined USL Championship team Indy Eleven on loan on September 3, 2025. He made his first appearance for the club on the same day, in a 0–2 away league victory over Hartford Athletic, replacing midfielder James Murphy in the 61st minute. He scored his first goal for the club on September 27, 2025, in a 2–1 home victory over FC Tulsa. Schaefer's loan expired at the end of the 2025 season, returning to FC Cincinnati 2.
