= Logan Neidlinger =

American soccer player (born 2005)

Personal information
- Full name: Logan Neidlinger
- Date of birth: September 6, 2005 (age 21)
- Place of birth: Indianapolis, Indiana, United States
- Height: 5 ft 9 in (1.75 m)
- Positions: Midfielder; defender

Team information
- Current team: Indy Eleven
- Number: 17

Youth career
- 2018–2020: Columbus Express SC
- 2021–2024: Indy Eleven Academy

Senior career*
Years	Team	Apps	(Gls)
2024–	Indy Eleven	24	(1)
- * Club domestic league appearances and goals as of October 25, 2025

Logan Neidlinger (born September 6, 2005) is an American soccer player who plays as both a defender and a midfielder for USL Championship club Indy Eleven. Neidlinger became the youngest goal scorer in Indy Eleven history on August 11, 2024, in a home match against New Mexico United.

== Early life and youth career ==
Born in Indianapolis, Neidlinger began his youth career at Columbus Express Soccer Club in Columbus, Indiana before joining the Indy Eleven Academy in 2021. On January 30, 2024, Neidlinger joined the Indy Eleven first team as an Academy signing, which allowed him to train with the team and compete in the USL Championship and Open Cup while maintaining NCAA eligibility.

== Career ==
Neidlinger made his first appearance with the Indy Eleven first team on July 13, 2024, replacing Sebastián Guenzatti in the 84th minute in a 1–1 home draw against Loudoun United FC.

On August 11, 2024, Neidlinger scored his first professional goal in a 1–3 home loss to New Mexico United. With this goal he became the first Indy Eleven player on a USL Academy contract to score for the club, as well as the youngest goal scorer in the club's history.

Neidlinger signed his first professional contract with Indy Eleven on October 9, 2024, following appearances in 11 games and one goal.

Neidlinger ended the 2024 season with 17 total appearances and one goal, including starting in the club's Open Cup semifinal match against Major League Soccer side Sporting Kansas City. On November 20, 2024, Indy Eleven confirmed Neidlinger would return for the 2025 season.

== Personal life ==
Neidlinger attended Roncalli High School in Indianapolis prior signing a professional contract with Indy Eleven.

== Career statistics ==
=== Club ===
As of match played August 2, 2025.

Appearances and goals by club, season and competition
Club	Season	League			U.S. Open Cup		League cup (Note: Includes USL Cup)		League Playoffs		Total	
Club	Season	Division	Apps	Goals	Apps	Goals	Apps	Goals	Apps	Goals	Apps	Goals
Indy Eleven	2024	USL Championship	15	1	1	0	–		1	0	17	1
Indy Eleven	2025	USL C	5	0	0	0	1	0	0	0	6	0
Career total			20	1	1	0	1	0	1	0	23	1

== See also ==
- Indy Eleven
- 2024 Indy Eleven season
- List of Indy Eleven records and statistics
