= Hunter Sulte =

American soccer player (born 2002)

- Sulte with the Portland Timbers in 2026

Personal information
- Date of birth: April 25, 2002 (age 24)
- Place of birth: Anchorage, Alaska, US
- Height: 6 ft 7 in (2.01 m)
- Position: Goalkeeper

Team information
- Current team: Portland Timbers
- Number: 26

Youth career
- 2016–2020: Portland Timbers

Senior career*
Years	Team	Apps	(Gls)
2018–	Portland Timbers 2	26	(0)
2021–	Portland Timbers	3	(0)
2024–2025	→ Indy Eleven (loan)	49	(0)
- * Club domestic league appearances and goals as of 18:07, December 8, 2025 (UTC)

Hunter Pendleton Sulte (born April 25, 2002) is an American professional soccer player who plays as a goalkeeper for Major League Soccer club Portland Timbers.

== Club career ==
=== Portland Timbers 2 (2018–2021) ===
Born in Anchorage, Alaska, Sulte left his hometown when he was 13 to attend a soccer academy in Portland, Oregon. After playing with the Portland Timbers academy, Sulte appeared for Portland's USL Championship side Portland Timbers 2 on March 7, 2020, starting in a 6–1 loss to Phoenix Rising. He had previously appeared with the club on the bench during their 2018 and 2019 seasons.

=== Portland Timbers (2021–present) ===
On November 11, 2020, it was announced that Sulte would join Portland's MLS roster as a homegrown player from the 2021 season. He is the first player from Alaska to sign an MLS Homegrown contract with an MLS club. Sulte chose Portland over a scholarship offer to play college soccer at Georgetown.

On May 1, 2021, Sulte made his MLS debut starting in a 4–1 loss to FC Dallas. At the age of 19 years and 6 days, Sulte became the second youngest goalkeeper to start an MLS match. Sulte, 6 ft. 7 in., became the tallest goalkeeper in MLS history to play in a match. On November 1, 2024, Sulte's contract option was picked up by Portland following a successful loan spell at Indy Eleven.

On December 4, 2025, Sulte signed a new multi-year contract with Portland following a second successive season on loan at Indy Eleven, with a contract through 2028 with an option for the 2028-29 season.

==== Indy Eleven (Loan, 2024–2025) ====
On February 23, 2024, Portland announced that Sulte would spend the 2024 season on loan at USL Championship club Indy Eleven. Sulte made his debut for Indy Eleven in a 1–1 away draw against Colorado Springs Switchbacks FC on April 20. Sulte won his first clean sheet on May 4, in a 1–0 victory away to Monterey Bay FC. He won his second league clean sheet in a 1–0 away win over Birmingham Legion FC on June 9 and his third on June 15 in a 1–0 home win over San Antonio FC. Sulte was named to the USL Championship Team of the Week and won the Save of the Week award for his week 15 performance against San Antonio, in which he saved a penalty kick and made his fifth overall clean sheet of the season in the league and cup. Sulte ended the season with 9 league and 2 Open Cup clean sheets, appearing in 31 matches for Indy Eleven.

On February 4, 2025, Portland announced that Sulte would return on loan to Indy Eleven for a second consecutive season. Sulte ended the season with 4 league clean sheets and 70 league saves. His 18 total clean sheets over two years across all competitions is the second-best record in Indy Eleven's history, as of 2025.
