= Josh O'Brien =

Irish footballer (born 2003)

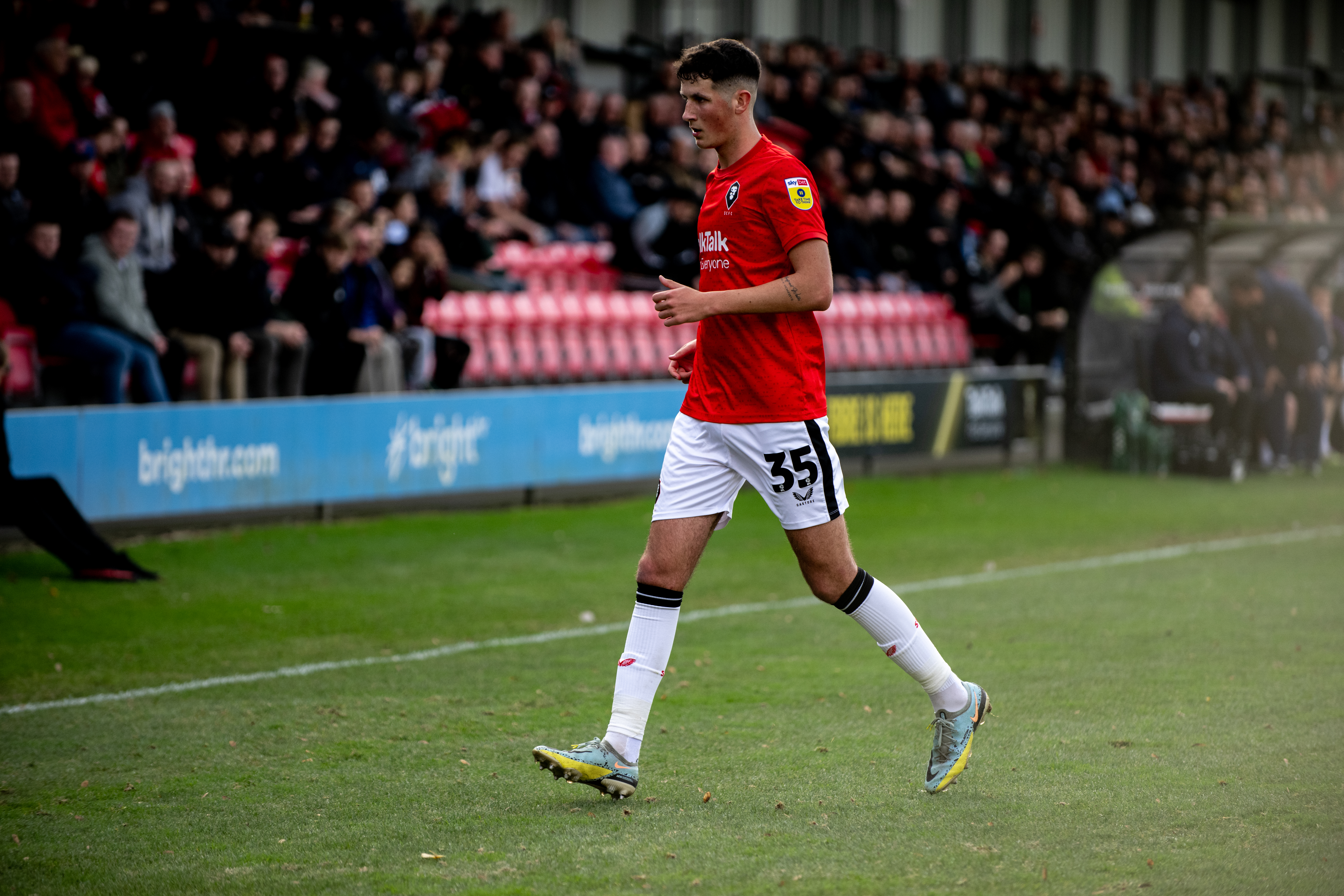
- O'Brien playing for Salford in October 2022

Personal information
- Full name: Joshua Manfred O'Brien
- Date of birth: 7 February 2003 (age 23)
- Place of birth: Dublin, Ireland
- Position: Defender

Team information
- Current team: Indy Eleven
- Number: 5

Youth career
- 20??–2020: Seattle Sounders FC
- 2020–2021: De Anza Force
- 2021–2022: Watford

Senior career*
Years	Team	Apps	(Gls)
2022–2023	Salford City	2	(0)
2022–2023	→ Telford United (loan)	10	(1)
2023–2024	Hamilton Academical	8	(0)
2024–	Indy Eleven	91	(9)
- * Club domestic league appearances and goals as of 19:09, 7 November 2026 (UTC)

Joshua Manfred O'Brien (born 7 February 2003) is an Irish professional footballer who plays as a defender or midfielder for USL Championship club Indy Eleven.

== Early life ==
O'Brien was born in Dublin, but moved to the United States at ten weeks old due to a change in his father's job. O'Brien's father is Irish and his mother, Nicole, is German. O'Brien has four brothers; Aran represented Santa Clara University and Ethan played for the University of Notre Dame. O'Brien was educated at Eastside Catholic in Washington state and Archbishop Mitty in California.

== Career ==
=== Youth career ===
O'Brien began his career with the Crossfire academy, though moved to Northern California to join developmental team De Anza Force in 2020. He attended the University of Washington, but in 2021 put his studies on hold to join English Premier League club Watford on a one-year contract (with the option of a further year) following a successful trial. O'Brien had been recommended to the club by the brother of Northern Ireland international George Saville. O'Brien was released by Watford in the summer of 2022 and joined the development squad at Salford City of EFL League Two.

=== Professional career ===
O'Brien made his senior debut for Salford on 30 August 2022, playing the full ninety minutes of a 2–1 win over Liverpool U21 at Moor Lane, and his first league start came against Northampton Town, keeping a clean sheet in a 1–0 win at Sixfields. On 12 December he joined Telford United on loan.

O'Brien joined Scottish League One side Hamilton Academical in August 2023, making 10 total appearances for the South Lanarkshire club.

On 1 February 2024, Indianapolis-based club Indy Eleven announced the signing of O'Brien ahead of the 2024 USL Championship season. The USL Championship club's owners had been interested in signing O'Brien since he joined Watford's development squad in 2021. O'Brien made his first appearance with the Eleven in their 2–1 season opening defeat against Oakland Roots as a substitute in the 75th minute, replacing Younes Boudadi. O'Brien scored his first goal for the Eleven on 1 June in a 2–1 away win against Pittsburgh Riverhounds. On 20 November 2024, Indy Eleven announced O'Brien would return for the 2025 season.

O'Brien scored his first goal of the 2025 season, and second for Indy Eleven, in a 1–1 draw against Birmingham Legion FC on 28 June in the USL Cup.

== Personal ==
O'Brien's brother, Ethan O'Brien, is also a professional footballer, with the brothers playing together at Indy Eleven in 2024.

== Career statistics ==
As of match played 2 August 2025.

Appearances and goals by club, season and competition
Club	Season	League			National cup (Note: Includes FA Cup, Scottish Cup, U.S. Open Cup)		League cup (Note: Includes EFL Cup, Scottish League Cup, USL Cup)		Other		Total	
Club	Season	Division	Apps	Goals	Apps	Goals	Apps	Goals	Apps	Goals	Apps	Goals
Salford City	2022-23	League Two	2	0	0	0	0	0	2 (Note: Appearance(s) in EFL Trophy)	0	4	0
Telford United (loan)	2022-23	National League North	10	1	0	0	—		1 (Note: Appearance(s) in FA Trophy)	0	11	1
Hamilton Academical	2023-24	Scottish League One	8	0	0	0	0	0	2 (Note: Appearance(s) in Scottish Challenge Cup)	0	10	0
Indy Eleven	2024	USL Championship	25	1	5	0	—		0	0	30	1
Indy Eleven	2025	USL Championship	21	0	2	0	5	1	0	0	28	1
Indy Eleven	2026	USL Championship	3	0	2	0	0	0	0	0	5	0
Indy Eleven	Total		69	2	9	0	5	1	0	0	88	2
Career total			88	2	9	0	5	1	5	0	88	3
