= Cameron Lindley =

American soccer player (born 1997)

Cam Lindley
Personal information
- Full name: Cameron Lindley
- Date of birth: July 18, 1997 (age 29)
- Place of birth: Carmel, Indiana, United States
- Height: 1.75 m (5 ft 9 in)
- Position: Midfielder

Team information
- Current team: Indy Eleven
- Number: 6

Youth career
- 2010–2016: Indiana Fire Juniors

College career
Years	Team	Apps	(Gls)
2016–2017	North Carolina Tar Heels	43	(7)

Senior career*
Years	Team	Apps	(Gls)
2016	Chicago Fire U-23	8	(2)
2017	Wilmington Hammerheads	6	(0)
2018–2019	Orlando City	3	(0)
2018	→ Saint Louis FC (loan)	1	(0)
2019	→ Memphis 901 (loan)	25	(1)
2020	Indy Eleven	12	(0)
2021	San Antonio FC	31	(0)
2022	Colorado Springs Switchbacks	31	(2)
2023–	Indy Eleven	116	(2)

International career^{‡}
2013	United States U17	10	(0)
2014–2015	United States U18	15	(0)
2015	United States U20	1	(0)
2019	United States U23	2	(0)
- * Club domestic league appearances and goals as of October 31, 2026 ‡ National team caps and goals as of March 24, 2019

Cameron Lindley (born July 18, 1997) is an American soccer player who plays as a midfielder for Indy Eleven in the USL Championship. Having played college soccer for the University of North Carolina at Chapel Hill, he joined Orlando City in 2018 after his Homegrown rights were traded from Chicago Fire.

== Youth and college career ==
Lindley grew up in Carmel, Indiana and spent a majority of his youth career with Indiana Fire Juniors, Chicago Fire's youth soccer club. He played high school soccer and basketball at Guerin Catholic High School in Noblesville, Indiana. Following several seasons with the youth club, Lindley spent a season in the Premier Development League with Chicago FC United before attending college. He spent two years at the University of North Carolina at Chapel Hill, scoring seven goals in 43 regular season matches.

== Professional career ==
=== Orlando City (2018 – 2019) ===
On January 18, 2018, Lindley's Homegrown rights were traded from Chicago Fire to Orlando City as Lindley signed a four-year deal with the Central Florida club. He made his professional debut in the season opener, a 1–1 draw at home to DC United. After starting three of the first four games of the season, Lindley failed to make another Major League Soccer (MLS) appearance in 2018 and only made one US Open Cup appearance.

==== St Louis FC (Loan, 2018) ====
On May 24, 2018, he was loaned to Saint Louis FC and made one start before returning.

==== Memphis 901 FC (Loan, 2019) ====
On April 12, 2019, he was loaned to USL Championship team Memphis 901 FC and made 26 appearances in all competitions. On November 21, 2019, it was announced Lindley had his contract option for the 2020 season declined by Orlando as part of the end-of-season roster decisions.

=== Indy Eleven (2020) ===
Lindley joined USL Championship side Indy Eleven on February 18, 2020. Over the course of the shortened 2020 USL Championship season, Lindley made 12 total appearances, 9 of which were starts, for the club. Lindley made his first appearance for the club in a 2–1 home victory over Sporting Kansas City II on July 18, 2020.

=== San Antonio FC (2021) ===
After a season with USL Championship side Indy Eleven in 2020, it was announced Lindley would sign with San Antonio FC ahead of the 2021 USL Championship season. Lindley played the majority of games for San Antonio that season, making 31 total league appearances including 23 starts.

=== Colorado Springs Switchbacks (2022) ===
On December 9, 2021, it was announced that Lindley would join USL Championship side Colorado Springs Switchbacks ahead of their 2022 season. Lindley played 34 games for Colorado Springs, scoring 2 goals as he assisted the team to the Western Conference final in the USL Championship Playoffs, where they lost 2–0 to San Antonio, Lindley's former club. San Antonio would go on to win the Playoffs by defeating Louisville City 3–1 in the final. Lindley was named to the USL Championship All-League team at the end of the 2022 season.

=== Return to Indy Eleven (2023 – present) ===
On December 1, 2022, Lindley made the move back to his former club Indy Eleven ahead of the 2023 season. Lindley made 36 total appearances in his return season to Indianapolis, including 33 USL Championship appearances, two US Open Cup appearances, and playing all 90 minutes of Indy Eleven's 5–0 loss to Charleston Battery in the 2023 USL Championship Playoffs.

Indy Eleven announced that Lindley would remain with the team for the 2024 season on November 17, 2023. He ended the season with 32 total league and cup appearances for the team, helping the Eleven reach the semifinals of the U.S. Open Cup for the first time in the club's history, defeating MLS side Atlanta United FC in the process. Indy Eleven announced on November 20, 2024, that Lindley would remain with the club for a third consecutive season.

Lindley scored his second goal for Indy on June 4, 2025, in a 1–0 victory over Birmingham Legion FC. The game also marked his 80th league appearance for the club across his two stints. Lindley made his 100th career appearance for Indy on August 2, 2025, in a 1–3 loss to Tampa Bay Rowdies, becoming the fifth player in the team's history to make 100 or more appearances.

== International career ==
Lindley has represented the United States internationally at various youth levels.

On March 19, 2019, Lindley was selected by his former Orlando City head coach Jason Kreis for the United States U23 squad for friendlies against Egypt and the Netherlands ahead of qualification for the Tokyo 2020 Olympics.

== Personal life ==
Lindley's younger sister, Cassidy, is also a soccer player who played for the University of Florida, Clemson University, and the Indy Eleven W League team.

== Career statistics ==
=== College ===
School	Season	NCAA Regular Season			
School	Season	Division	Apps	Goals	Assists
North Carolina Tar Heels	2016	Div. I	21	0	7
North Carolina Tar Heels	2017	Div. I	22	7	13
NCAA Total			43	7	20

- Source

=== Club ===
As of match played August 2, 2025.

Club	Season	League			League Cup		Open Cup		Playoffs		Total	
Club	Season	Division	Apps	Goals	Apps	Goals	Apps	Goals	Apps	Goals	Apps	Goals
Orlando City	2018	Major League Soccer	3	0	–		1	0	–		4	0
Orlando City	2019	Major League Soccer	0	0	–		0	0	0	0	0	0
Orlando City	Total		3	0	0	0	1	0	0	0	4	0
Saint Louis FC (loan)	2018	USL	1	0	–		0	0	0	0	1	0
Memphis 901 FC (loan)	2019	USL Championship	25	1	–		1	0	0	0	26	1
Indy Eleven	2020	USL Championship	12	0	–		–		0	0	12	0
San Antonio FC	2021	USL Championship	30	0	–		–		1	0	31	0
Colorado Springs Switchbacks	2022	USL Championship	31	2	–		0	0	3	0	34	2
Indy Eleven	2023	USL Championship	33	1	–		2	0	1	0	36	1
Indy Eleven	2024	USL Championship	29	0	–		4	0	0	0	33	0
Indy Eleven	2025	USL Championship	13	1	4	0	2	0	0	0	19	1
Indy Eleven	Total		75	2	4	0	8	0	1	0	88	2
Career totals			173	5	4	0	10	0	5	0	196	5

== Honors ==
=== Individual ===
- Atlantic Coast Conference Men's Soccer Freshman of the Year: 2016
- Atlantic Coast Conference Midfielder of the Year: 2017
- USL Championship All League Second Team: 2022, 2023
