= Sean McAuley =

English football manager (born 1972)

Personal information
- Date of birth: 23 June 1972 (age 54)
- Place of birth: Sheffield, England
- Height: 6 ft 0 in (1.83 m)
- Position: Defender

Team information
- Current team: Indy Eleven (Head Coach)

Youth career
- 1988–1990: Manchester United

Senior career*
Years	Team	Apps	(Gls)
1990–1992	Manchester United	0	(0)
1992–1995	St Johnstone	62	(0)
1994	→ Chesterfield (loan)	1	(1)
1995–1997	Hartlepool United	81	(1)
1997–2000	Scunthorpe United	69	(1)
1999	→ Scarborough (loan)	7	(0)
2000–2002	Rochdale	37	(0)
2002	Portland Timbers	16	(0)
2002–2005	Halifax Town	25	(0)

International career
1992	Scotland U21	1	(0)

Managerial career
- 2006: Sheffield Wednesday (caretaker)
- 2009–2010: Sheffield Wednesday (caretaker)
- 2023–2024: Minnesota United (interim)
- 2024–: Indy Eleven
- * Club domestic league appearances and goals

Sean McAuley (born 23 June 1972) is a football manager and former player who is the manager of Indy Eleven of the USL Championship. Born in England, he made one appearance for the Scotland U21 national team.

== Playing career ==
Sheffield-born McAuley began his football career with Manchester United, signing on with the club as an apprentice in July 1988. He turned professional on 21 June 1990, but was sold to St Johnstone for £80,000 two years later, without having made a single appearance for the United first team.

== Coaching career ==
=== Sheffield Wednesday F.C. caretaker (2006 & 2009–2010) ===
McAuley was appointed Sheffield Wednesday F.C.'s Academy head coach in January 2006.

He became caretaker manager of Sheffield Wednesday between the sacking of Paul Sturrock and the appointment of Brian Laws in late October and early November 2006 respectively. McAuley was in charge for four first-team games, winning three and drawing one. The victories were over Queens Park Rangers, Crystal Palace and Leicester City. The draw was a 2–2 scoreline at Wolverhampton Wanderers. Following the appointments of both Laws and Alan Irvine, he returned to his career as the Owls' Academy head coach.

Following the sacking of Brian Laws on 13 December 2009, McAuley was re-installed as caretaker manager, until a replacement could be found. His first game was a 2–0 home defeat to Swansea. He then went on to draw 2–2 with league leaders Newcastle United and lose 2–1 to Crystal Palace in the 3rd round of the FA Cup, both at home.

McAuley was also involved in Sheffield Wednesday's work to build partner relationships with clubs in North America. He developed ties with clubs in northern California and Michigan, and in April 2009 he travelled to Canada to undertake coaching sessions with Victoria Highlanders.

=== MLS assistant (2012 – 2024) ===
In July 2012, Sean McAuley departed Sheffield Wednesday in order to become the Assistant Manager at Major League Soccer club Portland Timbers. McAuley previously played in Portland for the pre-MLS Timbers. In August 2018, McAuley joined James O'Connor's technical staff at Orlando City SC as an assistant coach. In January 2020, McAuley joined Adrian Heath's coaching staff at Minnesota United FC as an assistant coach. In October 2023, McAuley was named interim head coach at Minnesota United FC following the sacking of Adrian Heath. McAuley departed Minnesota United FC on January 5.

=== Indy Eleven manager (2024 – present) ===
On January 8, 2024, McAuley was announced as the manager of Indy Eleven. McAuley was named USL Championship Coach of the Month on 12 June 2024 for a perfect month of May, winning 4 league matches and two U.S. Open Cup matches in that time. McAuley ended his first full season as manager with an 18–9–13 record in all competitions, leading Indy Eleven to their first home playoff match in 5 years and their best-ever performance in the U.S. Open Cup, falling in the semi-finals to finalists Sporting Kansas City.

== Managerial statistics ==
As of match played 5 April 2025.

Managerial record by team and tenure
Team	Nat	From	To	Record								Ref
Team	Nat	From	To	G	W	D	L	GF	GA	GD	Win %	Ref
Sheffield Wednesday (caretaker)	(England)	19 October 2006	6 November 2006	4	3	1	0	10	7	+3	75.00	
Sheffield Wednesday (caretaker)	(England)	13 December 2009	7 January 2010	3	0	1	2	3	6	−3	0.00	
Minnesota United (interim)	(United States)	6 October 2023	5 January 2024	2	1	0	1	6	5	+1	50.00	
Indy Eleven	(United States)	8 January 2024	Present	44	20	11	13	67	63	+4	45.45	
Total				53	24	13	16	86	81	+5	45.28	—
