= Indy Eleven =

American professional soccer club based in Indianapolis

- Full name: Indy Eleven
- Nickname: The Boys in Blue
- Founded: January 16, 2013; 13 years ago
- Stadium: Michael A. Carroll Stadium; Indianapolis, Indiana
- Capacity: 10,524 (expanded to 12,111)
- Owners: List: Ersal Ozdemir Brian Bauer Don Gottwald Shane Hageman Jeffrey A. Laborsky Fred Merritt Quinn Ricker Chris Traylor
- Chief Executive Officer: Greg Stremlaw
- Head coach: Sean McAuley
- League: USL Championship
- 2025: 9th, Eastern Conference; Playoffs: Did not qualify
- Website: indyeleven.com
Home colors	Away colors	Third colors

Indy Eleven is an American professional soccer team based in Indianapolis, Indiana, that plays in the USL Championship. Founded in 2013, the team made its debut in the North American Soccer League (NASL) in 2014, before moving to the United Soccer League (USL) in 2018. The club also began fielding a women's team in the USL W League beginning in 2022, with plans of eventually moving up to USL Super League.

The franchise plays its home games at IU Michael A. Carroll Track & Soccer Stadium, with plans for a new stadium at Eleven Park currently in doubt.

== History ==
Thanks in part to efforts from a grassroots soccer organization known as the Brickyard Battalion, on January 16, 2013, the NASL announced that an Indianapolis expansion team owned by Ersal Özdemir, CEO of Keystone Group LLC, would join the league in 2014. Özdemir named Peter Wilt as the team's first president and general manager, after the veteran American soccer executive had served in a consulting role to explore the viability of professional soccer in Indianapolis in the three months leading up to the January 2013 announcement.

The name and club colors were officially revealed to the public on April 25, 2013, during a ceremony held at Indianapolis' Soldiers' and Sailors' Monument. The team was named after the 11th Indiana Volunteer Infantry Regiment, an infantry regiment that served with notoriety in the Union Army during the American Civil War. Colonel Lew Wallace commanded the regiment, which was mustered on April 25, 1861. The team name reflects both the culture of the game and pays homage to the history of the state. The number also is an obvious reference to the number of players on the field when at full strength. The number eleven is also important to the world-renowned Indianapolis 500, with the race traditionally featuring eleven rows of cars and drivers and the first race being held in 1911.

Indy Eleven named former Indiana University standout and U.S. international, English Premier League, and Major League Soccer (MLS) veteran Juergen Sommer as its first head coach/director of soccer operations on June 11, 2013. On October 1, 2013, the team announced Kristian Nicht as their first signing.

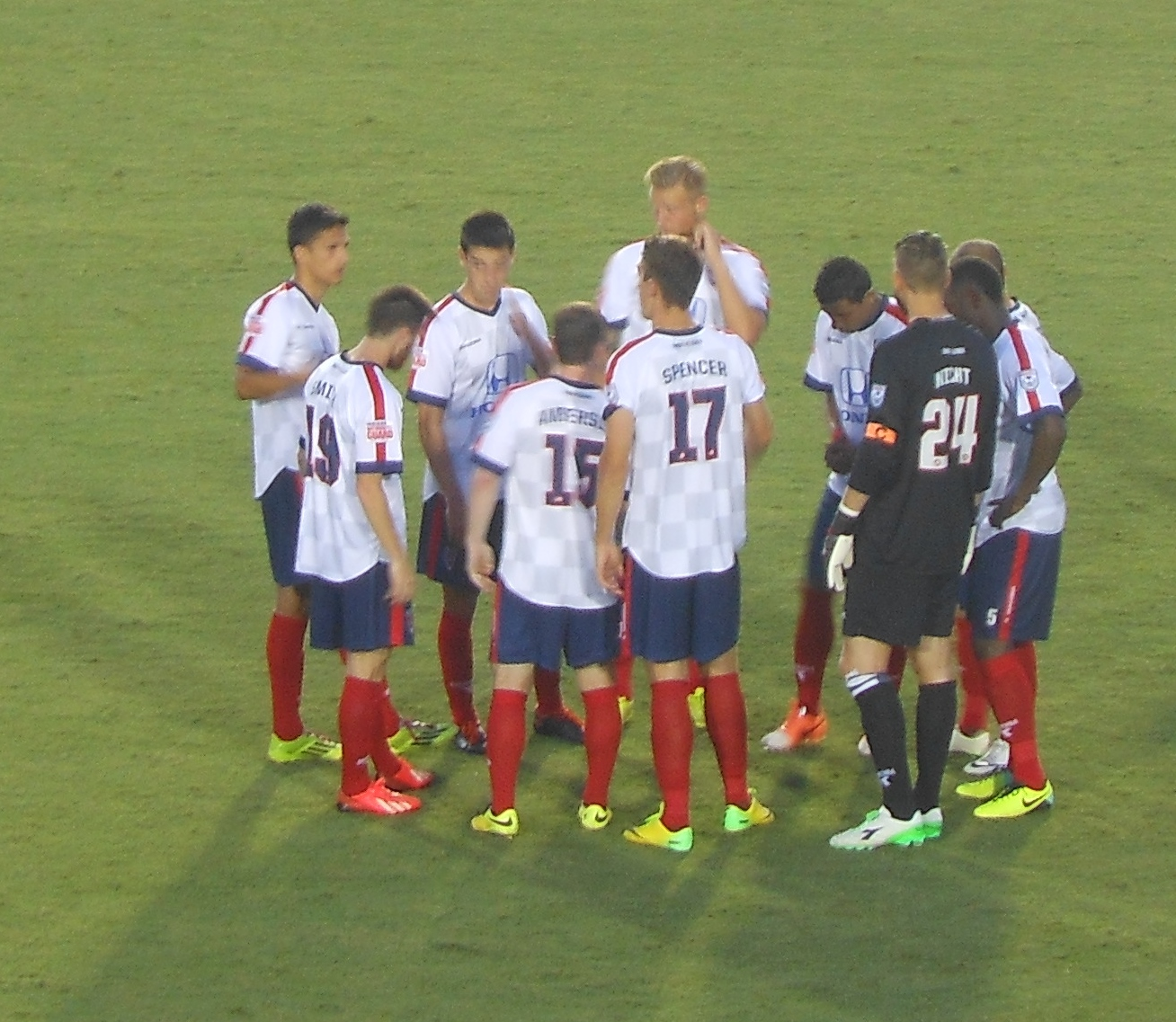
Indy Eleven players during a 2014 fall season league game

Even though the team did not begin play until the spring 2014 season, the team announced in November 2013 that it had already sold over 7,000 season tickets, and in capping season ticket sales, became the first team in NASL history to have a wait list for season tickets.

The team made its NASL regular-season debut on April 12, 2014, in a 1–1 draw against the Carolina Railhawks at home in front of 11,048 fans at Carroll Stadium.

On June 2, 2015, Sommer was fired as manager, with Tim Regan taking over in an interim capacity. Regan's interim role ended on December 2 with Tim Hankinson being appointed as the club's manager.

Indy Eleven won the 2016 Spring Championship after an undefeated season. The team, in a game called "The Miracle at the Mike," overturned a three-goal tiebreaker deficit to secure its first title.

On January 31, 2017, the Eleven announced that they would seek to join Major League Soccer during the league's expansion efforts for teams to join by 2020. The Eleven were passed over in the initial 2017 bidding.

On November 28, 2017, the Eleven announced that Tim Hankinson would not be returning as manager for the 2018 season.

On January 10, 2018, the Eleven announced they had left the NASL and joined the United Soccer League for the 2018 season. Martin Rennie was then named as the Eleven's new head coach on January 16.

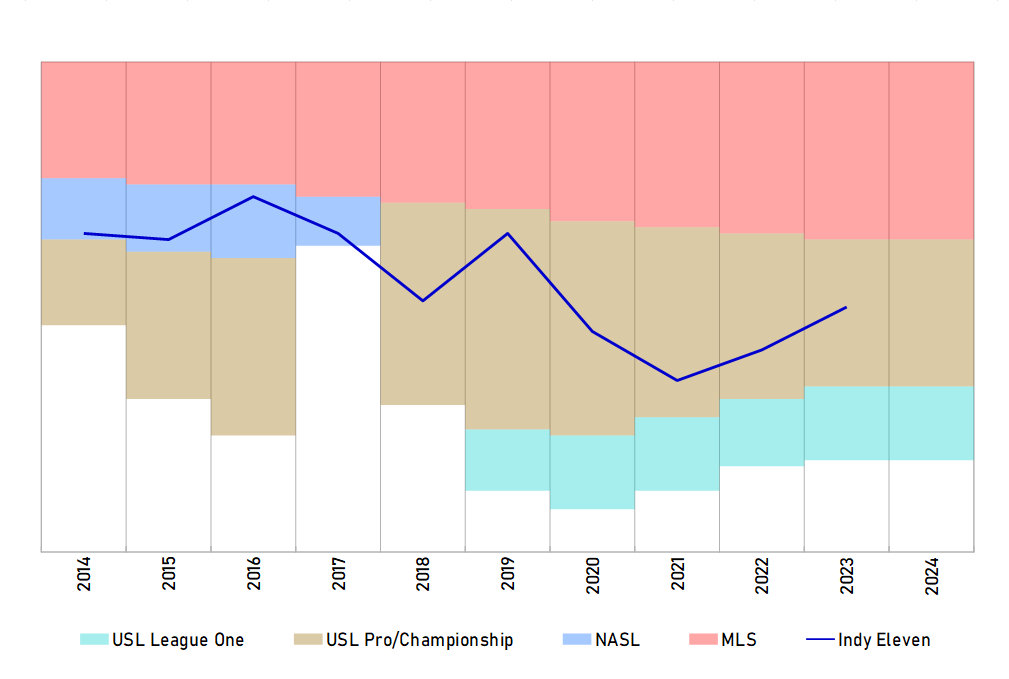
Historical chart of Indy Eleven's regular season performance within the American soccer pyramid

On March 27, 2020, The Shop Indy teamed up with Indy Eleven to start selling t-shirts with "Indy Eleven Cares" on it in response to the COVID-19 pandemic. Funds from the t-shirt sells would go to the Community Health Network Foundation's Lisa Borinstein Caregiver Assistance Fund to help employees and caregivers pay for medical expenses, transportation, food, and more.

On June 16, 2021, Indy Eleven and Rennie mutually agreed to part ways after four seasons. Rennie managed 99 matches and was the longest tenured coach in Indy Eleven history.

On November 16, 2021, Indy Eleven named Mark Lowry as the team's new head coach and fourth in club history.

On November 28, 2023, Indy Eleven announced the departure of Lowry after two seasons. Lowry led the Eleven to an overall regular season record of 25–28–15 and their first USL Championship playoff appearance since 2019.

On January 8, 2024, the club named former Minnesota United interim manager Sean McAuley as head coach, the fifth in club history.

=== Major League Soccer ===
Indianapolis became the 12th team to apply for one of four available expansion spots in MLS, submitting their application just before the January 31, 2017, deadline. However, on November 29, 2017, MLS Commissioner Don Garber announced the four finalist cities for the round of expansion and Indianapolis was not among them. Subsequently, Indy Eleven released a statement claiming, "We are planning on being a finalist for the next round of MLS expansion opportunities." Despite Indy Eleven's persistence to establish a stadium deal with the city and a location for the venue, other cities surpassed their efforts and were awarded franchises. This included Cincinnati, Nashville, Sacramento, St. Louis, and Charlotte, along with a new team in Austin.

Greg Stremlaw reiterated after Charlotte was accepted to MLS in December 2019, as the league's 30th team, that Indy Eleven is still committed to their bid and believes further expansion will occur. Stremlaw stated, "I think we have a very strong application" and claimed that the ownership group and the bid will stick to the process that they have followed throughout the expansion talks. Construction of Eleven Park was tied to an application for an MLS team initialized in 2024.

On April 25, 2024, Indianapolis mayor Joe Hogsett announced that he had been speaking with MLS commissioner Don Garber about bringing an expansion team to the city. Indy Eleven, as well as Eleven Park stadium developer Keystone Group, were not made aware of this fact or involved in the process, which places the club's future in doubt.

Keystone Group issued a statement on the same day accusing the mayoral administration of "preparing to walk away" from the stadium deal, which Hogsett's office later denied, stating that a proposal was made between Keystone and Indy Eleven but not the city. This is despite the fact that Hogsett himself attended the groundbreaking of the site in May 2023, which officials said was not a city endorsement of the project.

=== Indy Eleven Women ===
On September 24, 2021, Indy Eleven announced the fielding of a team in the amateur USL W League as part of the league's inaugural season in 2022. The team was the 17th team to be announced for the amateur women's league. The team hosted the league's first-ever match, defeating Kings Hammer FC 3–1. Indy Eleven won the Great Lakes Division in an undefeated 10–0–2 season and advanced to the playoffs, where they fell to eventual finalists Minnesota Aurora FC 2–1 in the quarter-finals.

On May 16, 2023, Indy Eleven announced that they had also acquired a franchise in the forthcoming professional USL Super League.

In the 2023 USL W League season, Indy Eleven won the USL W League's Valley division on head-to-head tiebreaker against Racing Louisville FC, then won the Central Conference championship over Minnesota Aurora FC. The campaign included a league-record 16–0 victory against St. Charles FC to clinch the division, avenging Indy Eleven's only loss during the season. Indy then advanced to its first national championship finals match on a 91st-minute stoppage-time goal by Alia Martin to defeat the San Francisco Glens 3–2 in the national semi-finals. Indy Eleven defeated the North Carolina Courage U23 2–1 to earn their first USL W League Championship.

Following the confirmation on February 9, 2024, that the USL Super League would receive Division One Sanctioning from the U.S. Soccer Federation ahead of the inaugural 2024–25 Super League season, the team announced the Indianapolis franchise would begin play following the completion of Eleven Park Stadium in 2025.

In June 2024, former Indy Eleven player Hal Hershfelt was called up as an alternate to the United States National Team's squad for the 2024 Summer Olympics in France.

In January 2025, Brandon Kim was promoted to head coach.

==== Year-by-year ====
Indy Eleven Women records by season
Season	League	Division	Regular season									Playoffs	Top goalscorer(s)	
Season	League	Division	Pld	W	L	D	GF	GA	GD	Pts.	Pos.	Playoffs	Name	Goals
2022	USL W	Great Lakes	12	10	0	2	31	7	+24	32	1st	QF	Katie Soderstrom	11
2023	USL W	Valley	10	8	1	1	40	3	+37	25	1st (Note: Tied for first on points with Racing Louisville FC, and won the first tiebreaker of head-to-head record (1–0–1).)	Champions	Sam Dewey; Madison Williams	7
2024	USL W	Valley	10	7	2	1	38	13	+25	23	1st	Conference Finals	Natalie Mitchell	7
2025	USL W	Valley	10	5	5	0	22	12	+10	15	3rd	did not qualify	Maddy Osswald	3
2026	USL W	Valley	9	6	1	2	29	6	+23	19	2nd	did not qualify	Reese Sochacki	6

== Record ==
This is a partial list of the last five seasons completed by Indy. For the full season-by-season history, see List of Indy Eleven seasons.

Overview of Indy Eleven seasons
Season	League											Position		Playoffs	USL Cup	USOC	Continental	Average attendance	Top goalscorer(s)	
Season	Div	League	Pld	W	L	D	GF	GA	GD	Pts	PPG	Conf.	Overall	Playoffs	USL Cup	USOC	Continental	Average attendance	Name	Goals
2021	2	USLC	32	9	15	8	32	47	−15	35	1.09	12th	25th	DNQ	N/A	NH	DNQ	N/A	(Venezuela) Manuel Arteaga	10
2022	2	USLC	34	12	17	5	41	55	−14	41	1.21	9th	19th	DNQ	N/A	R2	DNQ	8,285	(Brazil) Stefano Pinho	11
2023	2	USLC	34	13	11	10	46	38	+5	49	1.44	6th	11th	R1	N/A	R3	DNQ	9,709	(Uruguay) Sebastián Guenzatti	11
2024	2	USLC	34	14	11	9	49	50	-1	51	1.50	4th	7th	R1	N/A	SF	DNQ	9,795	(Sierra Leone) Augustine Williams	13
2025	2	USLC	30	10	15	5	44	52	-8	35	1.16	9th	18th	DNQ	QF	Ro32	DNQ	9,465	(Scotland) Jack Blake	11

1. Avg. attendance include statistics from league matches only.
2. Top goalscorer(s) includes all goals scored in league, league playoffs, U.S. Open Cup, USL Cup and other competitive continental matches.

== Colors and crest ==
The name "Eleven" does not reference the eleven players who take to the field representing the club, but pays homage to Indiana's 11th Regiment Indiana Infantry in the American Civil War, while the navy colored checkered background is a nod to both Indianapolis' auto-racing culture and the Brickyard Battalion supporters group. Lady Victory from the Soldiers' and Sailors' monument is the focal point of the crest. The color scheme is the same as that of the civic flag of Indianapolis.

== Kits ==
Predominantly red, white, and blue, the jerseys unveiled on October 1, 2013, also featured a sublimated checker board pattern paying homage to Indianapolis' rich auto racing heritage centered around the Indianapolis Motor Speedway. The jerseys were manufactured by Diadora and Honda was the primary sponsor.

The jerseys used from 2017 to 2020 were manufactured by Adidas with Honda remaining the sponsor. In 2021, USL entered into an agreement with sports apparel manufacturer Puma as the leagues official apparel partner. As part of this move, several teams including Indy Eleven changed to Puma as their kit manufacturer.

On January 1, 2024, the team announced that Under Armour would serve as their official kit provider beginning in the 2024 season. The club announced a sponsorship deal with Ford on January 16, 2024, that includes the auto company serving as the front shirt sponsor beginning in the 2024 season. The sponsorship replaces Honda, who were the team's primary sponsor from their first jersey unveiling in 2013.

=== Kit history ===
Home, away, and third kits.

- Home

2014–16	2017–18	2019–20	2021	2022–23	2024	2025	2026–

- Away

2014–16	2017–19	2020	2021	2022	2023	2024	2025	2026–

- Third

2014	2015	2025	2026–

=== Sponsorship ===
Kit sponsors for Indy Eleven
Period	Kit manufacturer	Shirt sponsor
2014–2016	(Italy) Diadora	Honda
2017–2020	(Germany) Adidas	Honda
2021–2023	(Germany) Puma	Honda
2024–present	(United States) Under Armour	Ford

== Supporters ==
=== Brickyard Battalion ===
The primary supporters group for the Indy Eleven is the Brickyard Battalion, established on August 3, 2011. The supporters group has its origins in a grassroots campaign to elicit local support for bringing professional soccer to Indianapolis. Membership consists of more than 2,000 supporters, with over 4,000 officially registered supporters throughout the state of Indiana; affiliate chapters in the greater Indianapolis area and beyond include, but are not limited to: Slaughterhouse-19 BYB, Battery 37 BYB and Cologne – Germany BYB (an affiliate chapter based in Cologne, Germany). The Brickyard Battalion name stems from the nearby Indianapolis Motor Speedway, nicknamed the Brickyard after the Start/Finish line, which is the sole remaining section of the original brick track.

== Rivalries ==
=== LIPAFC ===
Indy Eleven first played against Louisville City FC in the third round of the 2015 U.S. Open Cup, a game Louisville City won, 2–0. The two clubs met again in a series of friendlies the following two seasons, as well as the third round of the 2016 U.S. Open Cup, where Indy defeated Louisville by a score of 2–1. The arrival of the Eleven to the United Soccer League in 2018 resulted in the two becoming divisional rivals, and was given the unusual title of "Louisville-Indianapolis Proximity Association Football Contest", or "LIPAFC" during the season by both clubs on social media.

=== Victory & Liberty Derby ===
Named for the statues of Victory atop the Soldiers' and Sailors' Monument (Indianapolis) and of Lady Liberty atop the Allen County Courthouse (Indiana) dome in Fort Wayne, Indiana, the Eleven's inaugural match against Fort Wayne FC took place at Ruoff Mortgage Stadium on May 16, 2026, in the group stage of the USL Cup. Regular time finished 2–2 with Indy Eleven winning 3–1 in the ensuing penalty shootout.

== Stadium ==
Indy Eleven have played their home matches at IU Michael A. Carroll Track & Soccer Stadium, in downtown Indianapolis throughout their existence except for 2018 through 2020, when they played at the nearby Lucas Oil Stadium.

In early 2014, Indy Eleven sought to build a new $87 million stadium with a capacity of 18,500 seats, but were not able to build the political support to finance their plan. On January 13, 2015, House Bill 1273 was submitted to the Indiana General Assembly, proposing to pay for the stadium by expanding ticket taxes through 2045 instead of ending in 2023 at a projected $5 million per year, but the bill failed to pass.

In 2018, the club announced that they would play their home matches at Lucas Oil Stadium, home of the Indianapolis Colts. IU Carroll Stadium continued to be used as a secondary venue for if the home matches needed to be moved due to scheduling conflicts at Lucas Oil Stadium.

In 2019, the club announced a plan to build Eleven Park, a new $550 million mixed-use development, with a new stadium with a capacity of 20,000 as the centerpiece. This site is planned to include 600 apartments, 150,000 square feet (14,000 m^{2}) of office space, 100,000 square feet (9,300 m^{2}) of retail space, and a 200-room hotel. Ersal Ozdemir stated that is "the opportunity to create a vibrant community that will attract individuals and families from near and far to live, work and play". The club is proposing to fund $400 million for the project, with the remaining $150 million being financed through a public-private partnership. In February 2019, the Indy Eleven ownership asked lawmakers to fund $150 million of a soccer-specific stadium in the city.

On April 8, 2019, the Indiana House Ways and Means Committee unanimously voted to allow Indy Eleven to negotiate a stadium regardless of whether the team is accepted into MLS or not. This subsequently passed through the Senate and Governor Eric Holcomb approved plans to build the stadium.

On January 31, 2020, it was reported that the stadium's capacity might be adjusted downward from the original 20,000 to 12,000. Greg Stremlaw noted that the stadium will not be smaller than 12,000 seats and "will be built to ensure we can properly accommodate the fan base associated with leading the USL Championship league, but also be able to expand to all MLS specifications if and as needed". On February 3, 2021, the club stated it would return to Carroll Stadium starting with the 2021 season while the new stadium is constructed.

The club announced on June 24, 2022, that it had acquired 20 acres (8.1 ha) of land bounded by Kentucky Avenue, West Street, and the White River and will construct a 20,000 seat multi-purpose stadium starting in spring 2023 and opening in spring 2025. The complex will include apartments, offices, retail, and a hotel, and is projected to cost $1 billion. The site in southwest downtown Indianapolis was formerly the location of the Diamond Chain company and was acquired by Ozdemir's Keystone Group, which will handle development of the complex. Upon completion, the stadium itself will be owned by the Indianapolis Capital Improvement Board.

== Players ==
As of September 1, 2026

=== Current roster ===
Note: Flags indicate national team as defined under FIFA eligibility rules; some limited exceptions apply. Players may hold more than one non-FIFA nationality.

No.	Pos.	Nation	Player
1	GK	USA	Eric Dick
2	DF	ENG	Hayden White
3	DF	USA	Patrick Hogan
4	DF	TRI	Anthony Herbert
5	DF	IRL	Josh O'Brien
6	MF	USA	Cameron Lindley
8	MF	SCO	Jack Blake
9	FW	USA	Charlie Sharp
13	DF	USA	Joe Hafferty (on loan from Lexington SC)
14	MF	USA	Aodhan Quinn
15	FW	USA	Malik Henry-Scott (on loan from Lexington SC)
19	FW	UGA	Edward Kizza

No.	Pos.	Nation	Player
20	FW	USA	Dylan Sing
21	DF	USA	Makel Rasheed
22	MF	SOM	Mohamed Omar
23	GK	GRN	Reice Charles-Cook
27	FW	CUB	Bruno Rendón
29	DF	VEN	Alejandro Mitrano
36	DF	KEN	Nabilai Kibunguchy
37	DF	ENG	Paco Craig
39	DF	JAM	Hesron Barry
70	FW	USA	Tyler Lowden
90	FW	TOG	Loïc Mesanvi

1. USL Academy Contract

=== Out on loan ===
Note: Flags indicate national team as defined under FIFA eligibility rules; some limited exceptions apply. Players may hold more than one non-FIFA nationality.

No.	Pos.	Nation	Player
7	MF	USA	Allen Gavilanes (on loan to Union Omaha)
10	FW	ENG	Kian Williams (on loan to Detroit City FC)
17	DF	USA	Logan Neidlinger (on loan to Fort Wayne FC)

== Club Management ==
Ownership
Owners	Brian Bauer; Don Gottwald; Shane Hageman; Jeffrey Laborsky; Fred Merritt; Ersal Ozdemir; Quinn Ricker; Chris Traylor
Front Office
Chairman	Ersal Ozdemir
Chief Executive Officer	Greg Stremlaw
President	Chris Huber
Technical Staff
Head Coach	Sean McAuley
First Assistant Coach & Recruiting Coordinator	Phil Presser
Assistant Coach	Jason Perry
Director, Goalkeeping & Video Analyst	Andy Swift

== Honors ==
Indy Eleven honors
Competitions	Titles	Seasons
NASL Spring championship	1	2016

Indy Eleven Women's honors
Competitions	Titles	Seasons
USL W League Championship	1	2023

== See also ==
- List of Indy Eleven records and statistics
- LIPAFC
