= Jack Blake =

Scottish footballer (born 1994)

Personal information
- Full name: Jack James Blake
- Date of birth: 22 September 1994 (age 32)
- Place of birth: Nottingham, England
- Position: Midfielder

Team information
- Current team: Indy Eleven
- Number: 8

Youth career
- 2002–2004: Notts County
- 2004–2013: Nottingham Forest

Senior career*
| Years | Team | Apps | (Gls) |
| 2013–2015 | Nottingham Forest | 0 | (0) |
| 2013 | → Mansfield Town (loan) | 3 | (0) |
| 2016 | Minnesota United | 11 | (0) |
| 2017 | Jacksonville Armada | 27 | (10) |
| 2018 | Tampa Bay Rowdies | 6 | (1) |
| 2018 | → Real Monarchs (loan) | 17 | (1) |
| 2019–2020 | Real Monarchs | 38 | (9) |
| 2021–2022 | San Diego Loyal | 51 | (8) |
| 2023– | Indy Eleven | 128 | (35) |

International career^{‡}
| 2011–2012 | Scotland U19 | 5 | (1) |
- * Club domestic league appearances and goals as of 31 October 2026 ‡ National team caps and goals as of 28 October 2019

Jack James Blake (born 22 September 1994) is a professional footballer who plays for USL Championship side Indy Eleven. Born in England, he has represented Scotland at youth level.

== Career ==
=== Nottingham Forest (2013–2015) ===
Blake started his football career at the Notts County youth level before joining neighbours Nottingham Forest at youth level from the under-10's team through to the club's academy. In May 2012, Blake was awarded his first professional contract with the club. Blake then made a first team breakthrough when he was included in the bench for the senior team for the club's home game against Peterborough United on 12 January 2013.

==== Mansfield Town (loan, 2013) ====
Blake was loaned for a month to county rivals, Mansfield Town on 19 October 2013. He made his professional debut on 22 October 2013 during a 0–0 draw against Bury. After making his professional debut, Blake expressed his happiness to make his debut. After making three appearances for the club, Blake made his return to his parent club. Despite rumors that Blake may returned to Mansfield Town on loan for the second time, this was played down by manager Paul Cox.

After his loan spell at Mansfield Town came to an end, Blake continued playing in the club's reserve until being released by the club at the end of the 2014–15 season.

=== Minnesota United (2016) ===
On 26 May 2016, Minnesota United announced that Blake had signed with the North American Soccer League club. Seven days later on 2 June 2016, Blake scored his first Minnesota United debut (and his first professional goal) in the third round of the U.S. Open Cup, winning 3–0 against Saint Louis.

=== Jacksonville Armada (2017) ===
On 18 January 2017, it was reported that the Jacksonville Armada had signed Blake ahead of the NASL's 2017 season. Blake was named the NASL's Young Player of the Year after recording nine goals and four assists with the Armada.

=== Tampa Bay Rowdies (2018) ===
On 8 February 2018, the Tampa Bay Rowdies announced they had received Blake on a season-long loan from Jacksonville. A little over a month later, on 15 March 2018, he terminated his Armada FC contact, and joined the Rowdies on a permanent basis.

On 19 June 2018, Blake moved on loan to Utah-based USL side Real Monarchs.

=== Real Monarchs (2019–2020) ===
Blake's moved to Salt Lake permanently ahead of their 2019 season, going on to captain Real Monarchs during their 2019 season. He re-signed with the club on 18 December 2019 for the 2020 season. He announced his departure from the club in December 2020.

=== San Diego Loyal (2021–2022) ===
On 14 December 2019, Blake signed with USL Championship side San Diego Loyal.

=== Indy Eleven (2023–present) ===
After two seasons in San Diego, Blake moved to USL Championship club Indy Eleven on 6 January 2023.

Blake scored the first goal for Indy Eleven in the 2024 USL Championship season in a 2–1 defeat at Oakland Roots on 9 March 2024. Blake scored two goals for Indy Eleven in their 5–3 defeat away to rivals Louisville City, a penalty kick in the 34th minute and the team's second goal of the game in the 60th minute, assisted by Sebastian Guenzatti. He scored a second brace in a 2–1 home victory over Phoenix Rising on 25 May, leading the team to an 8 game winning streak in all competitions. Blake was named to the USL Championship team of the week five times in the first 12 weeks of the 2024 season, notably leading the Eleven to a 9-game undefeated streak in all competitions and a perfect month of May with no draws or losses. Blake led the team with 4 league goals and one U.S. Open Cup goal in May 2024. Blake scored his eleventh league goal for Indy Eleven, and 8th goal of the season, on 9 June 2024, converting a penalty in the team's 1–0 away victory over Birmingham Legion FC. Blake ended the season as the club's joint top goalscorer in the league and helped lead the team to a historic first semifinal in the U.S. Open Cup, defeating Major League Soccer (MLS) side Atlanta United FC in the quarterfinals.

Indy Eleven announced that Blake would return for a third consecutive season on 20 November 2024. Blake scored the opening goal for Indy Eleven's 2025 season, converting a penalty kick in the 3rd minute of their 3–1 away victory over Miami FC on 15 March 2025. Blake scored his fifth league goal of the season on 18 July 2025 in a 2–4 away defeat against North Carolina FC. He scored his sixth career brace on 23 August 2025 for defeat Miami FC 3–2 and record 20 total league goal for Indy Eleven.

== International career ==
Though he was born in Nottingham, England, Blake is eligible to play for Scotland through his Scottish grandfather. In September 2011, Blake was called up by Scotland U19 and went on to make five appearances for the team.

== Personal life ==
Blake earned his U.S. green card in 2019. His status also qualifies him as a domestic player for MLS roster purposes.

== Career statistics ==
=== Club ===
As of match played 27 September 2025.

Appearances and goals by club, season and competition
| Club | Season | League | | | National Cup | | League Cup | | Other | | Total | |
| Club | Season | Division | Apps | Goals | Apps | Goals | Apps | Goals | Apps | Goals | Apps | Goals |
|---|---|---|---|---|---|---|---|---|---|---|---|---|
| Nottingham Forest | 2012–13 | EFL Championship | 0 | 0 | 0 | 0 | 0 | 0 | — | | 0 | 0 |
| Nottingham Forest | 2013–14 | EFL Championship | 0 | 0 | 0 | 0 | 0 | 0 | — | | 0 | 0 |
| Nottingham Forest | 2014–15 | EFL Championship | 0 | 0 | 0 | 0 | 0 | 0 | — | | 0 | 0 |
| Nottingham Forest | Total | | 0 | 0 | 0 | 0 | 0 | 0 | — | | 0 | 0 |
| Mansfield Town (loan) | 2013–14 | EFL League Two | 3 | 0 | 0 | 0 | 0 | 0 | — | | 3 | 0 |
| Mansfield Town (loan) | Total | | 3 | 0 | 0 | 0 | 0 | 0 | — | | 3 | 0 |
| Minnesota United | 2016 | NASL | 11 | 0 | 1 | 1 | — | | — | | 12 | 1 |
| Minnesota United | Total | | 11 | 0 | 1 | 1 | 0 | 0 | — | | 12 | 1 |
| Jacksonville Armada | 2017 | NASL | 27 | 10 | 2 | 1 | — | | — | | 29 | 11 |
| Jacksonville Armada | Total | | 27 | 10 | 2 | 1 | — | | — | | 29 | 11 |
| Tampa Bay Rowdies | 2018 | USL | 6 | 1 | 1 | 0 | — | | — | | 7 | 1 |
| Tampa Bay Rowdies | Total | | 6 | 1 | 1 | 0 | — | | — | | 7 | 1 |
| Real Monarchs (loan) | 2018 | USL | 17 | 1 | — | | — | | — | | 17 | 1 |
| Real Monarchs | 2019 | USL Championship | 25 | 8 | — | | — | | 4 | 3 | 29 | 11 |
| Real Monarchs | 2020 | USL C | 13 | 1 | Cancelled: COVID-19 pandemic | | — | | — | | 13 | 1 |
| Real Monarchs | Total | | 55 | 10 | — | | — | | 4 | 3 | 59 | 13 |
| San Diego Loyal | 2021 | USL C | 25 | 5 | Cancelled: COVID-19 pandemic | | — | | — | | 25 | 5 |
| San Diego Loyal | 2022 | USL C | 26 | 3 | 1 | 0 | — | | — | | 27 | 3 |
| San Diego Loyal | Total | | 51 | 8 | 1 | 0 | — | | — | | 52 | 8 |
| Indy Eleven | 2023 | USL C | 30 | 3 | 2 | 0 | 0 | 0 | — | | 32 | 3 |
| Indy Eleven | 2024 | USL C | 26 | 10 | 4 | 1 | 1 | 0 | — | | 31 | 11 |
| Indy Eleven | 2025 | USL C | 26 | 10 | 1 | 0 | 5 | 1 | 0 | 0 | 32 | 11 |
| Indy Eleven | Total | | 82 | 23 | 7 | 1 | 6 | 1 | 0 | 0 | 95 | 25 |
| Career total | | | 235 | 52 | 12 | 3 | 6 | 1 | 4 | 3 | 257 | 59 |
