= 2025 FC Naples season =

FC Naples
2025 season
- CEO: Roberto Moreno
- Head Coach: Matt Poland
- Stadium: Paradise Coast Sports Complex Stadium
- USL League One: 4th
- U.S. Open Cup: Third Round
- USL Cup: 6th Group Stage Dead Last
- USL Playoffs: Semifinals
- Top goalscorer: League: Karsen Henderlong (14 goals); All: Karsen Henderlong (16 goals)
- Highest home attendance: 4,618 vs Chattanooga Red Wolves SC March 8
- Lowest home attendance: 2,267 vs South Georgia Tormenta FC August 6, 2,174 vs Little Rock Rangers April 2 (US Open Cup)
- Average home league attendance: 3,488, 3,527 with USL Cup, With USL Cup and U.S. Open Cup 3,450, With Playoffs, USL Cup, and U.S. Open Cup 3,459, With Playoffs, USL Cup but not US Open Cup 3,533, With USL Cup but not US Open Cup or Playoffs 3,527
- Biggest win: Texoma FC 0–3 FC Naples April 5
- Biggest defeat: FC Naples 1–4 AV Alta FC June 28

The 2025 season was the inaugural season in the club's existence as well as their first in USL League One, the third-tier of American soccer.

== Current roster ==
As of August 5, 2025

Note: Flags indicate national team as defined under FIFA eligibility rules; some limited exceptions apply. Players may hold more than one non-FIFA nationality.

| No. | Pos. | Nation | Player |
|---|---|---|---|
| 1 | GK | USA | Lalo Delgado |
| 2 | DF | USA | Brecc Evans |
| 3 | DF | USA | Julian Cisneros |
| 4 | DF | NCA | Max Glasser |
| 5 | DF | ARG | Tomás Ritondale |
| 6 | DF | USA | Gustavo Fernandes |
| 7 | MF | SCO | Tyler Pasnik |
| 8 | DF | AUS | Chris Heckenberg |
| 9 | FW | USA | Karsen Henderlong |
| 10 | MF | UGA | Jayden Onen |
| 11 | FW | USA | Dominick Bachstein |
| 12 | DF | USA | Ian Garrett |

| No. | Pos. | Nation | Player |
|---|---|---|---|
| 14 | DF | IRL | Kevin O'Connor |
| 17 | GK | USA | Tony Halterman |
| 18 | GK | PUR | Joel Serrano |
| 19 | MF | USA | Thomas Bowe |
| 21 | MF | ESP | Marc Torrellas |
| 22 | MF | USA | Luka Prpa |
| 23 | MF | COL | Andrés Ferrín |
| 24 | MF | USA | Roscoe Rubinstein |
| 25 | DF | USA | Jake Dengler |
| 30 | MF | USA | Ian Cerro |
| 32 | DF | PUR | Rodolfo Sulia |
| 34 | GK | IRL | Luca Cy Fitzgerald |

1. USL Academy Contract

== Transfers ==
=== In ===
| Date | Position | Number | Name | from | Type | Fee | Ref. |
|---|---|---|---|---|---|---|---|
| December 9, 2024 | MF | 10 | (Uganda) Jayden Onen | (United States) Lexington SC | Signing | NA | |
| December 13, 2024 | DF | 14 | (Republic of Ireland) Kevin O'Connor | (Republic of Ireland) Cork City | Signing | NA | |
| December 17, 2024 | DF | 25 | (United States) Jake Dengler | (United States) South Georgia Tormenta FC | Signing | NA | |
| December 20, 2024 | GK | 1 | (United States) Lalo Delgado | (United States) Northern Colorado Hailstorm | Signing | NA | |
| December 23, 2024 | MF | 30 | (United States) Ian Cerro | (United States) Georgia FC | Signing | NA | |
| December 23, 2024 | DF | 4 | (Nicaragua) Max Glasser | (United States) Monterey Bay FC | Signing | NA | |
| December 27, 2024 | FW | 7 | (Scotland) Tyler Pasnik | (United States) Huntsville City FC | Signing | NA | |
| December 30, 2024 | DF | 2 | (United States) Brecc Evans | (United States) Northern Colorado Hailstorm | Signing | NA | |
| January 3, 2025 | GK | 17 | (United States) Tony Halterman | (United States) Chicago House AC | Signing | NA | |
| January 3, 2025 | GK | 18 | (Puerto Rico) Joel Serrano | (Puerto Rico) Academia Quintana | Signing | NA | |
| January 9, 2025 | DF | 12 | (United States) Ian Garrett | (Finland) SalPa | Signing | NA | |
| January 9, 2025 | MF | 21 | (Spain) Marc Torrellas | (United States) Loyola Ramblers | Signing | NA | |
| January 11, 2025 | FW | 9 | (United States) Karsen Henderlong | (United States) Indy Eleven | Signing | NA | |
| January 11, 2025 | DF | 3 | (United States) Julian Cisneros | (United States) Loyola Ramblers | Signing | NA | |
| January 14, 2025 | FW | 8 | (Australia) Chris Heckenberg | (United States) Central Valley Fuego FC | Signing | NA | |
| January 18, 2025 | FW | 11 | (United States) Justin Weiss | (United States) Indiana Hoosiers | Signing | NA | |
| February 6, 2025 | MF | 22 | (United States) Luka Prpa | (United States) Chicago Fire FC II | Signing | NA | |
| February 10, 2025 | FW | | (Bolivia) Sebastián Joffre | (United States) Real Monarchs | Signing | NA | |
| February 20, 2025 | DF | 6 | (United States) Gustavo Fernandes | (United States) Chattanooga Red Wolves SC | Signing | NA | |
| February 20, 2025 | DF | 32 | (Puerto Rico) Rodolfo Sulia | (Puerto Rico) Academia Quintana | Signing | NA | |
| February 26, 2025 | MF | 23 | (Colombia) Andrés Ferrín | (Colombia) Once Caldas U20 | Signing | NA | |
| April 24, 2025 | MF | 24 | (United States) Roscoe Rubinstein | (United States) FC Naples Academy | Academy Call Up | NA | |
| April 24, 2025 | MF | 19 | (United States) Thomas Bowe | (United States) FC Naples Academy | Academy Call Up | NA | |
| July 23, 2025 | GK | 34 | (Republic of Ireland) Luca Cy Fitzgerald | (United States) FC Naples Academy | Academy Callup | NA | |
| July 25, 2025 | DF | 5 | (United States) Tomas Ritondale | (United States) Huntsville City FC | 25 Day Contract | NA | |
| August 5, 2025 | FW | 11 | (United States) Dominick Bachstein | (United States) Des Moines Menace | signing | NA | |

=== Out ===
| Date | Position | Number | Name | to | Type | Fee | Ref. |
|---|---|---|---|---|---|---|---|
| July 14, 2025 | FW | | (United States) Justin Weiss | NA | Retirement | NA | |

== Non-competitive fixtures ==
=== Friendlies ===
| June 17 Midseason | FC Naples (United States) | 1–2 | (Portugal) Benfica | Tampa, Florida |
| | Weiss | Report | Oliveira; Belotti | Stadium: Waters Sportsplex |

| September 17 Midseason | FC Naples | 2–2 | Naples United | Naples, Florida |
| 7:00 PM EDT | Cerro (pen.); Fernandes | Report | Goal | Stadium: Paradise Coast Sports Complex |

== Competitive fixtures ==
=== Regular season ===
| March 8 1 | FC Naples | 1–1 | Chattanooga Red Wolves SC | Naples, Florida |
| 7:00 PM EDT | Heckenberg (yellow card) 23'; Ferrín 77' (pen.); O'Connor (yellow card) 90+4' | Report | Bentley (yellow card) 29'; Filipe (yellow card) 42'; Hernandez 47'; Kinzner (yellow card) 75'; Jnohope (red card) 90+8' | Stadium: Paradise Coast Sports Complex; Attendance: 4,618; Referee: Alejo Calume |

| March 15 2 | FC Naples | 2–0 | Forward Madison FC | Naples, Florida |
| 7:00 PM EDT | Henderlong 22', 41'; Onen (yellow card) 24'; Glasser (yellow card) 90'; Fernandes (yellow card) 90+4' | Report | Murphy (yellow card) 20' | Stadium: Paradise Coast Sports Complex; Attendance: 4,598; Referee: Edson Carvajal |

| March 22 3 | Spokane Velocity | 0–1 | FC Naples | Spokane, Washington |
| 4:00 PM PDT | Peláez (yellow card) 57' | Report | Henderlong 55'; Delgado (yellow card) 90+1' | Stadium: ONE Spokane Stadium; Attendance: 1,903; Referee: Robert Vincze |

| March 29 4 | FC Naples | 0–0 | Portland Hearts of Pine | Naples, Florida |
| 7:00 PM EDT | Glasser (yellow card) 28'; Ferrín (yellow card) 35'; Cisneros (yellow card) 45+3'; Pasnik (yellow card) 87' | Report | Varela (yellow card) 38'; Wright (yellow card) 61' | Stadium: Paradise Coast Sports Complex; Attendance: 4,294; Referee: Benjamin Meyer |

| April 5 5 | Texoma FC | 0–3 | FC Naples | Sherman, Texas |
| 8:00 PM EDT | Kilwien (yellow card) 37'; Chavez (yellow card) 44'; Asanté (yellow card) 45+2'; Ramos (yellow card) 71'; Jordan (yellow card) 82' | Report | Henderlong 30'; Evans 53'; Cisneros (yellow card) 57'; Torrellas (yellow card) 65'; Dengler 88' | Stadium: Sherman Bearcat Stadium; Attendance: 854; Referee: Jaclyn Metz |

| April 12 6 | FC Naples | 2–1 | Richmond Kickers | Naples, Florida |
| 7:00 PM EDT | Ferrín 8'; Henderlong 22' (yellow card) 50'; Glasser (yellow card) 45+1'; O'Connor (yellow card) 68'; Delgado (yellow card) 75'; Prpa (yellow card) 90+7' | Report | Garnett (yellow card) 18'; Schenfeld (yellow card) 26'; Espinal 35'; França (yellow card) 42'; Vaughan (yellow card) 80' | Stadium: Paradise Coast Sports Complex; Attendance: 4,005; Referee: Amin Hadzic |

| April 19 7 | FC Naples | 0–1 | One Knoxville SC | Naples, Florida |
| 7:00 PM EDT | Garrett (yellow card) 43'; Evans (yellow card) 45'; Fernandes (yellow card) 57'; Onen (yellow card) 63'; Dengler (yellow card) 90+3' | Report | Ritchie (yellow card) 9'; Zarokostas (yellow card) 25'; Caputo (yellow card) 38'; Tekiela 45' (pen.); Lewis (yellow card) 77'; Haugli (yellow card) 90+3' | Stadium: Paradise Coast Sports Complex; Attendance: 3,846; Referee: Velimir Stefanovic |

| May 14 9 | Chattanooga Red Wolves SC | 3–1 | FC Naples | East Ridge, Tennessee |
| 12:00 PM EDT | Ayimbila (yellow card) 8'; Kinzner (yellow card) 16'; Hernández 42'; Mackenzie (yellow card) 60'; Knapp 85' (red card) 90+8'; Alhassan (yellow card) 89'; Bentley 90+4' | Report | Onen 10' (yellow card) 26' (red card) 90+10'; Cisneros (yellow card) 15'; Evans (yellow card) 22'; Ferrín (yellow card) 35'; O'Connor (yellow card) 65'; Dengler (yellow card) 87' (red card) 90+10'; Delgado (red card) 90+9' | Stadium: CHI Memorial Stadium; Attendance: 1,986; Referee: Gloria Resendiz |

| May 17 10 | Portland Hearts of Pine | 2–1 | FC Naples | Portland, Maine |
| 6:00 PM EDT | Vinberg (yellow card) 40'; Kamara 43'; Morse (yellow card) 58'; Messer (yellow card) 60'; Varela 75' | Report | Serrano (red card) 8'; Heckenberg (yellow card) 30'; Henderlong (yellow card) 45' (yellow-red card) 77'; Fernandes (yellow card) 45+4'; Prpa 56' | Stadium: Fitzpatrick Stadium; Attendance: 5,715; Referee: Lauren Aldrich |

| May 25 11 | FC Naples | 3–1 | Union Omaha | Naples, Florida |
| 8:00 PM EDT | Ferrín 20' (pen.); Cisneros (yellow card) 23'; Cerro 45+3'; Onen 49'; O'Connor (yellow card) 69' | Report | Milanese (yellow card) 19'; Gallardo 32' (pen.); Ouamri (yellow card) 56' | Stadium: Paradise Coast Sports Complex; Attendance: 3,907; Referee: Rodrigo Albuquerque |

| June 7 12 | Greenville Triumph SC | 1–1 | FC Naples | Clemson, South Carolina |
| 7:00 PM EDT | Castro 37'; Soto (yellow card) 88'; Evans (yellow card) 90+7' | Report | Henderlong 13'; Heckenberg (yellow card) 62'; Ferrín (yellow card) 69'; Onen (yellow card) 90+8' | Stadium: Riggs Field; Attendance: 1,221; Referee: Alex Beehler |

| June 14 13 | FC Naples | 2–2 | Chattanooga Red Wolves SC | Naples, Florida |
| 8:00 PM EDT | Weiss 33', 41'; Ferrín (yellow card) 51'; Evans (yellow card) 62'; Garrett (yellow card) 90+6' | Report | Knapp 36'; Hernández 43'; Jérez (yellow card) 81'; Ayimbila (yellow card) 83' | Stadium: Paradise Coast Sports Complex; Attendance: 3,518; Referee: Alexandra Billeter |

| June 25 14 | South Georgia Tormenta FC | 2–1 | FC Naples | Statesboro, Georgia |
| 7:30 PM EDT | Alves (yellow card) 33'; Pack (yellow card) 36'; Dengler 43' (o.g.); Gray (yellow card) 66'; Reid-Stephen 81'; Jones (yellow card) 87'; Cabral (yellow card) 90+7' | Report | Onen 37' (pen.); Prpa (yellow card) 57'; Cisneros (red card) 71' | Stadium: Tormenta Stadium; Attendance: 377; Referee: Luis Arroyo |

| June 28 8 | AV Alta FC | 4–1 | FC Naples | Lancaster, California |
| 11:00 PM EDT | Desdunes 26'; Blancas 59', 73', 86'; Alassane (yellow card) 61'; Pajaro (yellow card) 69'; Aoumaich (yellow card) 78' | Report | Torrellas 47' | Stadium: Lancaster Municipal Stadium; Attendance: 4,420; Referee: Jay Schlesinger |

| July 12 15 | FC Naples | 2–1 | Westchester SC | Naples, Florida |
| 8:00 PM EDT | Delgado (yellow card) 12'; Onen 33' (yellow card) 73'; Henderlong 83' | Report | Obregón 14' (pen.) (yellow card) 73'; Bolanos (yellow card) 32'; Mackic (yellow card) 35'; Guezen (yellow card) 72'; Palma (yellow card) 85' | Stadium: Paradise Coast Sports Complex; Attendance: 2,974; Referee: John Griggs |

| July 19 16 | AV Alta FC | 1–1 | FC Naples | Lancaster, California |
| 11:00 PM EDT | Alassane (yellow card) 20'; Robledo (yellow card) 28'; Villalobos 32'; Pehlivanov (yellow card) 35'; Avilez (yellow card) 73' | Report | Dengler (yellow card) 24'; Henderlong (yellow card) 50'; Evans (yellow card) 61'; Glasser (yellow card) 86'; Cisneros 90+1' | Stadium: Lancaster Municipal Stadium; Attendance: 4,557; Referee: Dion Coxe-Trieger |

| August 2 17 | Richmond Kickers | 1–2 | FC Naples | Richmond, Virginia |
| 7:00 PM EDT | Johnson 12'; Baer (yellow card) 45'; O'Dwyer (yellow card) 60' | Report | Henderlong (yellow card) 38'; Prpa 57'; Henderlong 63' | Stadium: City Stadium; Attendance: 4,393; Referee: Rogelio Alvarez |

| August 6 18 | FC Naples | 2–1 | South Georgia Tormenta FC | Naples, Florida |
| 8:00 PM EDT | Torrellas (yellow card) 16'; Henderlong 36'; Prpa 45+4' | Report | Reid-Stephen 41'; Drey (yellow card) 44' | Stadium: Paradise Coast Sports Complex; Attendance: 2,267; Referee: Joshua Encarnación |

| August 9 19 | FC Naples | 2–1 | Texoma FC | Naples, Florida |
| 7:30 PM EDT | Garrett 23'; Cisneros 45+1'; Cerro (yellow card) 56'; Dengler (yellow card) 66'; Torrellas (yellow card) 86' | Report | Baker (yellow card) 58'; Spengler (yellow card) 69'; McCormick 90+1' | Stadium: Paradise Coast Sports Complex; Attendance: 3,065; Referee: Amin Hadzic |

| August 16 20 | Forward Madison FC | 0–0 | FC Naples | Madison, Wisconsin |
| 8:00 PM EDT | Murphy (yellow card) 32'; Mesias (yellow card) 33'; Brown (yellow card) 54'; Glaeser (yellow card) 56' | Report | Garrett (yellow card) 79' | Stadium: Breese Stevens Field; Attendance: 4,305; Referee: Servando Berna Rico |

| August 27 21 | One Knoxville SC | 0–0 | FC Naples | Knoxville, Tennessee |
| 7:00 PM EDT | Brown (yellow card) 29'; Caputo (yellow card) 54'; Zarokostas (yellow card) 80'; Thomas (yellow card) 90' | Report | Cisneros (yellow card) 57'; Evans (yellow card) 86' | Stadium: Covenant Health Park; Attendance: 1,547; Referee: John Matto |

| August 30 22 | FC Naples | 2–2 | Westchester SC | Naples, Florida |
| 7:00 PM EDT | Henderlong 14', 23'; Onen (yellow card) 67' | Report | Obregón 4'; Pierre (yellow card) 41'; Saydee (yellow card) 45'; Palma (yellow card) 45+6'; Bouman 49'; Guezen (yellow card) 62'; Bolanos (yellow card) 89' | Stadium: Paradise Coast Sports Complex; Attendance: 2,742; Referee: Carlos Rodriguez |

| September 6 23 | FC Naples | 2–1 | Greenville Triumph SC | Naples, Florida |
| 7:00 PM EDT | Henderlong 45+5'; Cisneros 45+9' | Report | Mensah 66'; Evans (yellow card) 83' | Stadium: Paradise Coast Sports Complex; Attendance: 2,774; Referee: Kevin Lewis |

| September 12 24 | Charlotte Independence | 0–1 | FC Naples | Charlotte, North Carolina |
| 7:00 PM EDT | Jauregui (yellow card) 40' | Report | Onen 74' (pen.) (yellow card) 85'; Cerro (yellow card) 90+4'; Delgado (yellow card) 90+5'; O'Connor (yellow card) 90+7' | Stadium: American Legion Memorial Stadium; Attendance: 1,042; Referee: DeShun Beard |

| September 21 25 | Portland Hearts of Pine | 1–0 | FC Naples | Portland, Maine |
| 5:00 PM EDT | Murphy (yellow card) 9'; Wright 39' (pen.) (yellow card) 68'; Messer (yellow card) 44'; Morse (yellow card) 90+3' | Report | Dengler (yellow card) 37' (yellow-red card) 80'; Heckenberg (yellow card) 85' | Stadium: Fitzpatrick Stadium; Attendance: 5,862; Referee: Edson Carvajal |

| September 27 26 | FC Naples | 4–0 | AV Alta FC | Naples, Florida |
| 7:00 PM EDT | Onen 28' (yellow card) 45+5'; O'Connor 45+2'; Cisneros 58'; Fernandes (yellow card) 76'; Cerro 76' | Report | Pehlivanov (yellow card) 10' | Stadium: Paradise Coast Sports Complex; Attendance: 3,091; Referee: Aleksandar Zhelyazkov |

| October 5 27 | Union Omaha | 2–1 | FC Naples | Papillion, Nebraska |
| 5:00 PM EDT | Kallman (yellow card) 34'; Kasim 57'; Pinho 64'; Acoff (yellow card) 73' | Report | Henderlong (yellow card) 6'; Torrellas (yellow card) 77'; Bachstein 80'; Dengler (yellow card) 82'; Onen (yellow card) 89' | Stadium: Werner Park; Attendance: 2,285; Referee: Alex Beehler |

| October 12 28 | Westchester SC | 2–0 | FC Naples | Mount Vernon, New York |
| 2:00 PM EDT | Palma (yellow card) 11'; Evans 64' (o.g.); Obregón 74' | Report | Dengler (yellow card) 49'; Heckenberg (yellow card) 86' | Stadium: The Stadium at Memorial Field; Attendance: 2,121; Referee: Benjamin Meyer |

| October 18 29 | FC Naples | 0–1 | Spokane Velocity | Naples, Florida |
| 7:00 PM EDT | Ferrín (yellow card) 32'; Heckenberg (yellow card) 90+5' | Report | Gil 87'; Akale (yellow card) 90+6' | Stadium: Paradise Coast Sports Complex; Attendance: 3,572; Referee: Richonne Clark |

| October 25 30 | FC Naples | 2–0 | Charlotte Independence | Naples, Florida |
| 7:00 PM EDT | Heckenberg (yellow card) 24'; Henderlong 64', 80' (pen.); Pasnik (yellow card) 75' | Report | Sorenson (yellow card) 15'; Ciss (yellow card) 40' | Stadium: Paradise Coast Sports Complex; Attendance: 3,043; Referee: Corbyn May |

=== Playoffs ===
| November 1 Quarterfinals | FC Naples | 0–0 (a.e.t.) (4–3 p) | Union Omaha | Naples, Florida |
| 7:30 PM EDT | Henderlong (yellow card) 45+1'; Ferrín (yellow card) 49'; O'Connor (yellow card) 76'; Cisneros (yellow card) 107' | Report | Acoff (yellow card) 90+4'; Kasim (yellow card) 99' | Stadium: Paradise Coast Sports Complex; Attendance: 3,636; Referee: Cristian Campo |
| | Penalties |
| | Prpa (penalty scored); Pasnik (penalty missed); Dengler (penalty scored); O'Connor (penalty missed); Onen (penalty scored); Garrett (penalty scored) | | (penalty scored) Ors; (penalty missed) Jiba; (penalty scored) Faz; (penalty missed) Ostrem; (penalty scored) Martinez; (penalty missed) Bronnik |

| November 8 Semifinals | One Knoxville SC | 1–0 | FC Naples | Knoxville, Tennessee |
| 7:00 PM EDT | Zarokostas (yellow card) 40'; Fuller (yellow card) 62'; Tekiela 66'; Skelton (yellow card) 70' | Report | Cisneros (yellow card) 42' | Stadium: Covenant Health Park; Attendance: 4,285; Referee: John Griggs |

=== Lamar Hunt US Open Cup ===
| March 18 First Round | Sarasota Paradise | 1–2 | FC Naples | Lakewood Ranch, Florida |
| 7:00 PM EDT | Sljivic (yellow card) 34'; Rodriguez (yellow card) 45+3' (yellow-red card) 90+6'; Salgado 88'; Panozzo (yellow card) 90+8' | Report | Dengler (yellow card) 64'; Cisneros (yellow card) 68'; Henderlong 79'; O'Connor 90+1' (yellow card) 90+7'; Delgado (yellow card) 90+7' | Stadium: Premier Sports Campus; Attendance: 2,248; Referee: Mazdid Coric |

| April 2 Second Round | FC Naples | 3–0 | Little Rock Rangers | Naples, Florida |
| 7:30 PM EDT | Onen 1'; Evans 14'; Ferrín 77' | Report | Gray (yellow card) 57'; Dube (yellow card) 58' | Stadium: Paradise Coast Sports Complex; Attendance: 2,174; Referee: Edson Caravajal |

| April 16 Third Round | FC Naples | 1–1 (a.e.t.) (8–9 p) | Tampa Bay Rowdies | Naples, Florida |
| 7:00 PM EDT | Onen (yellow card) 10'; Prpa 27'; Cisneros (yellow card) 69'; Torrellas (yellow card) 102' | Report | Guillén (yellow card) 2'; Niyongabire 26'; Bassett (yellow card) 106' | Stadium: Paradise Coast Sports Complex; Attendance: 3,418; Referee: Muhammad Hassan |
| | Penalties |
| | Henderlong (penalty scored); Onen (penalty scored); Dengler (penalty scored); Heckenberg (penalty missed); Cerro (penalty scored); Pasnik (penalty scored); Evans (penalty scored); Torrellas (penalty scored); Fernandes (penalty scored); Cisneros (penalty missed) | | Bassett (penalty scored); Fernandes (penalty missed); MacPherson (penalty scored); Crisotomo (penalty scored); Pacius (penalty scored); Mustali (penalty scored); Castellanos (penalty scored); Skinner (penalty scored); Vancaeyezeele (penalty scored); Lasso (penalty scored) |

=== USL Cup ===
| April 26 Group Stage | FC Naples | 1–0 | Charleston Battery | Naples, Florida |
| 7:00 PM EDT | Henderlong 18' (yellow card) 38'; Dengler (yellow card) 90'; Gordan (red card) 90+6' | Report | Rubín (yellow card) 90+5' | Stadium: Paradise Coast Sports Complex; Attendance: 4,172; Referee: Atahan Yaya |

| May 31 Group Stage | Miami FC | 3–2 | FC Naples | Miami, Florida |
| 7:30 PM EDT | Romero (yellow card) 21'; Mercado (yellow card) 29' (goal) 50'; Ricketts 36'; Lawrence 76' | Report | O'Connor 44'; Cisneros 47'; Dengler (yellow card) 55'; Evans (yellow card) 90+4' | Stadium: Pitbull Stadium; Attendance: 1,208; Referee: Greg Dopka |

| July 4 Group Stage | FC Naples | 0–2 | Tampa Bay Rowdies | Naples, Florida |
| 8:00 PM EDT | Ferrín (yellow card) 74'; Cisneros (yellow card) 76' | | Vancaeyezeele (yellow card) 26'; Pacius 38'; Arteaga 60'; Lasso (yellow card) 61'; Wyke (yellow card) 90+3' | Stadium: Paradise Coast Sports Complex; Attendance: 3,472; Referee: Calin Radosav |

| July 26 Group Stage | Greenville Triumph SC | 2–1 | FC Naples | Greenville, South Carolina |
| 7:00 PM EDT | Soto (yellow card) 16'; Wright (yellow card) 45+4'; Castro 45+7'; Marsh 67' | Report | Pasnik 2' (yellow card) 45+2'; Ferrín (yellow card) 45+4'; Prpa (yellow card) 47'; Heckenberg (yellow card) 64' | Stadium: Paladin Stadium; Attendance: 1,265; Referee: Muhammad Hassan |

=== Appearances and goals ===
| No. | Pos | Nat | Player | Total | | USL League One | | Lamar Hunt US Open Cup | | USL Cup | | USL League One Playoffs | |
| No. | Pos | Nat | Player | Apps | Goals | Apps | Goals | Apps | Goals | Apps | Goals | Apps | Goals |
|---|---|---|---|---|---|---|---|---|---|---|---|---|---|
| 1 | GK | (United States) USA | Lalo Delgado | 37 | 0 | 29+0 | 0 | 3+0 | 0 | 3+0 | 0 | 2+0 | 0 |
| 2 | DF | (United States) USA | Brecc Evans | 39 | 2 | 30+0 | 1 | 3+0 | 1 | 3+1 | 0 | 2+0 | 0 |
| 3 | DF | (United States) USA | Julian Cisneros | 38 | 5 | 25+4 | 4 | 3+0 | 0 | 3+1 | 1 | 2+0 | 0 |
| 4 | DF | (Nicaragua) NCA | Max Glasser | 35 | 0 | 25+1 | 0 | 1+2 | 0 | 3+1 | 0 | 2+0 | 0 |
| 5 | DF | (Argentina) ARG | Tomas Ritondale | 4 | 0 | 0+3 | 0 | 0+0 | 0 | 1+0 | 0 | 0+0 | 0 |
| 6 | DF | (United States) USA | Gustavo Fernandes | 21 | 0 | 4+12 | 0 | 1+1 | 0 | 1+1 | 0 | 0+1 | 0 |
| 7 | FW | (Scotland) SCO | Tyler Pasnik | 26 | 1 | 1+18 | 0 | 2+1 | 0 | 1+2 | 1 | 0+1 | 0 |
| 8 | MF | (Australia) AUS | Chris Heckenberg | 39 | 0 | 28+2 | 0 | 3+0 | 0 | 3+1 | 0 | 2+0 | 0 |
| 9 | FW | (United States) USA | Karsen Henderlong | 38 | 16 | 28+1 | 14 | 1+2 | 1 | 3+1 | 1 | 2+0 | 0 |
| 10 | MF | (Uganda) UGA | Jayden Onen | 32 | 7 | 23+1 | 6 | 3+0 | 1 | 3+0 | 0 | 2+0 | 0 |
| 11 | FW | (United States) USA | Dominick Bachstein | 7 | 1 | 0+7 | 1 | 0+0 | 0 | 0+0 | 0 | 0+0 | 0 |
| 11 | FW | (United States) USA | Justin Weiss | 7 | 2 | 3+2 | 2 | 0+0 | 0 | 0+2 | 0 | 0+0 | 0 |
| 12 | DF | (United States) USA | Ian Garrett | 21 | 1 | 4+12 | 1 | 1+0 | 0 | 1+1 | 0 | 0+2 | 0 |
| 14 | DF | (Republic of Ireland) IRL | Kevin O'Connor | 37 | 3 | 22+7 | 1 | 2+1 | 1 | 2+1 | 1 | 2+0 | 0 |
| 17 | GK | (United States) USA | Tony Halterman | 1 | 0 | 0+1 | 0 | 0+0 | 0 | 0+0 | 0 | 0+0 | 0 |
| 18 | GK | (Puerto Rico) PUR | Joel Serrano | 4 | 0 | 1+1 | 0 | 0+0 | 0 | 1+0 | 0 | 0+1 | 0 |
| 19 | MF | (United States) USA | Thomas Bowe | 0 | 0 | 0+0 | 0 | 0+0 | 0 | 0+0 | 0 | 0+0 | 0 |
| 21 | MF | (Spain) ESP | Marc Torrellas | 37 | 0 | 22+6 | 0 | 1+2 | 0 | 3+1 | 0 | 2+0 | 0 |
| 22 | MF | (United States) USA | Luka Prpa | 37 | 4 | 14+14 | 3 | 3+0 | 1 | 2+2 | 0 | 0+2 | 0 |
| 23 | MF | (Colombia) COL | Andrés Ferrín | 38 | 4 | 26+3 | 3 | 1+2 | 1 | 4+0 | 0 | 0+2 | 0 |
| 24 | MF | (United States) USA | Roscoe Rubinstein | 8 | 0 | 0+4 | 0 | 1+1 | 0 | 1+1 | 0 | 0+0 | 0 |
| 25 | DF | (United States) USA | Jake Dengler | 33 | 1 | 26+0 | 1 | 2+0 | 0 | 2+1 | 0 | 2+0 | 0 |
| 30 | MF | (United States) USA | Ian Cerro | 30 | 1 | 16+6 | 1 | 2+1 | 0 | 2+1 | 0 | 2+0 | 0 |
| 32 | DF | (Puerto Rico) PUR | Rodolfo Sulia | 16 | 0 | 2+11 | 0 | 0+1 | 0 | 1+1 | 0 | 0+0 | 0 |
| 34 | GK | (Republic of Ireland) IRL | Luca Cy Fitzgerald | 0 | 0 | 0+0 | 0 | 0+0 | 0 | 0+0 | 0 | 0+0 | 0 |
| | FW | (Bolivia) BOL | Sebastián Joffre | 0 | 0 | 0+0 | 0 | 0+0 | 0 | 0+0 | 0 | 0+0 | 0 |

=== Top goalscorers ===
| Rank | Position | Number | Name | USL1 Season | U.S. Open Cup | USL Cup | USL League One Playoffs | Total |
|---|---|---|---|---|---|---|---|---|
| 1 | FW | 9 | (United States) Karsen Henderlong | 14 | 1 | 1 | 0 | 16 |
| 2 | MF | 10 | (Uganda) Jayden Onen | 6 | 1 | 0 | 0 | 7 |
| 3 | DF | 3 | (United States) Julian Cisneros | 4 | 0 | 1 | 0 | 5 |
| 4 | MF | 23 | (Colombia) Andrés Ferrín | 3 | 1 | 0 | 0 | 4 |
| 4 | MF | 24 | (United States) Luka Prpa | 3 | 1 | 0 | 0 | 4 |
| 6 | DF | 14 | (Republic of Ireland) Kevin O'Connor | 1 | 1 | 1 | 0 | 3 |
| 7 | FW | 11 | (United States) Justin Weiss | 2 | 0 | 0 | 0 | 2 |
| 7 | MF | 30 | (United States) Ian Cerro | 2 | 0 | 0 | 0 | 2 |
| 7 | DF | 2 | (United States) Brecc Evans | 1 | 1 | 0 | 0 | 2 |
| 10 | FW | 11 | (United States) Dominick Bachstein | 1 | 0 | 0 | 0 | 1 |
| 10 | DF | 12 | (United States) Ian Garrett | 1 | 0 | 0 | 0 | 1 |
| 10 | MF | 21 | (Spain) Marc Torrellas | 1 | 0 | 0 | 0 | 1 |
| 10 | DF | 25 | (United States) Jake Dengler | 1 | 0 | 0 | 0 | 1 |
| 10 | FW | 7 | (Scotland) Tyler Pasnik | 0 | 0 | 1 | 0 | 1 |
| Total | | | | 40 | 6 | 4 | 0 | 50 |

=== Assist scorers ===
| Rank | Position | Number | Name | USL1 Season | U.S. Open Cup | USL Cup | USL League One Playoffs | Total |
|---|---|---|---|---|---|---|---|---|
| 1 | MF | 14 | (Republic of Ireland) Kevin O'Connor | 5 | 2 | 0 | 0 | 7 |
| 2 | FW | 9 | (United States) Karsen Henderlong | 4 | 0 | 0 | 0 | 4 |
| 2 | MF | 10 | (Uganda) Jayden Onen | 2 | 1 | 1 | 0 | 4 |
| 4 | MF | 23 | (Colombia) Andrés Ferrín | 3 | 0 | 0 | 0 | 3 |
| 4 | MF | 21 | (Spain) Marc Torrellas | 2 | 0 | 1 | 0 | 3 |
| 6 | DF | 8 | (Nicaragua) Max Glasser | 2 | 0 | 0 | 0 | 2 |
| 6 | MF | 22 | (United States) Luka Prpa | 1 | 1 | 0 | 0 | 2 |
| 8 | MF | 8 | (United States) Chris Heckenberg | 1 | 0 | 0 | 0 | 1 |
| 8 | MF | 30 | (United States) Ian Cerro | 1 | 0 | 0 | 0 | 1 |
| 8 | FW | 7 | (Scotland) Tyler Pasnik | 0 | 1 | 0 | 0 | 1 |
| 8 | DF | 12 | (United States) Ian Garrett | 0 | 0 | 1 | 0 | 1 |
| Total | | | | 21 | 5 | 3 | 0 | 29 |

=== Clean sheets ===
| Rank | Number | Name | USL1 Season | U.S. Open Cup | USL Cup | Total |
|---|---|---|---|---|---|---|
| 1 | 1 | (United States) Edward Delgado | 6 | 1 | 1 | 8 |

=== Disciplinary record ===
| No. | Pos. | Player | USL League One Regular Season | | | Lamar Hunt US Open Cup | | | USL Cup | | | USL League One Playoffs | | | Total | | |
| No. | Pos. | Player | Yellow card | (yellow card) (yellow-red card) | Red card | Yellow card | (yellow card) (yellow-red card) | Red card | Yellow card | (yellow card) (yellow-red card) | Red card | Yellow card | (yellow card) (yellow-red card) | Red card | Yellow card | (yellow card) (yellow-red card) | Red card |
| 1 | GK | (United States) Lalo Delgado | 4 | 0 | 1 | 1 | 0 | 0 | 0 | 0 | 0 | 0 | 0 | 0 | 5 | 0 | 1 |
| 2 | DF | (United States) Brecc Evans | 5 | 0 | 0 | 0 | 0 | 0 | 1 | 0 | 0 | 0 | 0 | 0 | 6 | 0 | 0 |
| 3 | DF | (United States) Julian Cisneros | 5 | 0 | 1 | 2 | 0 | 0 | 1 | 0 | 0 | 2 | 0 | 0 | 10 | 0 | 1 |
| 4 | DF | (Nicaragua) Max Glasser | 4 | 0 | 0 | 0 | 0 | 0 | 0 | 0 | 0 | 0 | 0 | 0 | 4 | 0 | 0 |
| 5 | DF | (Argentina) Tomas Ritondale | 0 | 0 | 0 | 0 | 0 | 0 | 0 | 0 | 0 | 0 | 0 | 0 | 0 | 0 | 0 |
| 6 | DF | (United States) Gustavo Fernandes | 4 | 0 | 0 | 0 | 0 | 0 | 0 | 0 | 0 | 0 | 0 | 0 | 4 | 0 | 0 |
| 7 | FW | (Scotland) Tyler Pasnik | 2 | 0 | 0 | 0 | 0 | 0 | 1 | 0 | 0 | 0 | 0 | 0 | 3 | 0 | 0 |
| 8 | MF | (Australia) Chris Heckenberg | 7 | 0 | 0 | 0 | 0 | 0 | 1 | 0 | 0 | 0 | 0 | 0 | 8 | 0 | 0 |
| 9 | FW | (United States) Karsen Henderlong | 7 | 1 | 0 | 0 | 0 | 0 | 1 | 0 | 0 | 1 | 0 | 0 | 9 | 1 | 0 |
| 10 | MF | (Uganda) Jayden Onen | 9 | 0 | 1 | 1 | 0 | 0 | 0 | 0 | 0 | 0 | 0 | 0 | 10 | 0 | 1 |
| 11 | FW | (United States) Justin Weiss | 0 | 0 | 0 | 0 | 0 | 0 | 0 | 0 | 0 | 0 | 0 | 0 | 0 | 0 | 0 |
| 11 | FW | (United States) Dominick Bachstein | 0 | 0 | 0 | 0 | 0 | 0 | 0 | 0 | 0 | 0 | 0 | 0 | 0 | 0 | 0 |
| 12 | DF | (United States) Ian Garrett | 3 | 0 | 0 | 0 | 0 | 0 | 0 | 0 | 0 | 0 | 0 | 0 | 3 | 0 | 0 |
| 14 | DF | (Republic of Ireland) Kevin O'Connor | 5 | 0 | 0 | 1 | 0 | 0 | 0 | 0 | 0 | 1 | 0 | 0 | 7 | 0 | 0 |
| 17 | GK | (United States) Tony Halterman | 0 | 0 | 0 | 0 | 0 | 0 | 0 | 0 | 0 | 0 | 0 | 0 | 0 | 0 | 0 |
| 18 | GK | (Puerto Rico) Joel Serrano | 0 | 0 | 1 | 0 | 0 | 0 | 0 | 0 | 0 | 0 | 0 | 0 | 0 | 0 | 1 |
| 19 | MF | (United States) Thomas Bowe | 0 | 0 | 0 | 0 | 0 | 0 | 0 | 0 | 0 | 0 | 0 | 0 | 0 | 0 | 0 |
| 21 | MF | (Spain) Marc Torrellas | 4 | 0 | 0 | 1 | 0 | 0 | 0 | 0 | 0 | 0 | 0 | 0 | 5 | 0 | 0 |
| 22 | MF | (United States) Luka Prpa | 2 | 0 | 0 | 0 | 0 | 0 | 1 | 0 | 0 | 0 | 0 | 0 | 3 | 0 | 0 |
| 23 | MF | (Colombia) Andres Ferrin | 5 | 0 | 0 | 0 | 0 | 0 | 2 | 0 | 0 | 1 | 0 | 0 | 8 | 0 | 0 |
| 25 | DF | (United States) Jake Dengler | 8 | 1 | 1 | 1 | 0 | 0 | 2 | 0 | 0 | 0 | 0 | 0 | 11 | 1 | 1 |
| 30 | MF | (United States) Ian Cerro | 2 | 0 | 0 | 0 | 0 | 0 | 0 | 0 | 0 | 0 | 0 | 0 | 2 | 0 | 0 |
| 32 | DF | (Puerto Rico) Rodolfo Sulia | 0 | 0 | 0 | 0 | 0 | 0 | 0 | 0 | 0 | 0 | 0 | 0 | 0 | 0 | 0 |
| | FW | (Bolivia) Sebastian Joffre | 0 | 0 | 0 | 0 | 0 | 0 | 0 | 0 | 0 | 0 | 0 | 0 | 0 | 0 | 0 |
| | MF | (United States) Thomas Bowe | 0 | 0 | 0 | 0 | 0 | 0 | 0 | 0 | 0 | 0 | 0 | 0 | 0 | 0 | 0 |
| | Coaching | (United States) | 0 | 0 | 0 | 0 | 0 | 0 | 0 | 0 | 1 | 0 | 0 | 0 | 0 | 0 | 0 |
| Total | | | 76 | 2 | 5 | 7 | 0 | 0 | 10 | 0 | 1 | 5 | 0 | 0 | 98 | 2 | 6 |

== Awards and honors ==
=== USL League One Team of the Matchday ===
| Matchday | Player | Opponent | Position | Ref |
|---|---|---|---|---|
| 1 | (United States) Jake Dengler | Chattanooga Red Wolves SC | DF | |
| 1 | (Colombia) Andrés Ferrín | Chattanooga Red Wolves SC | Bench | |
| 2 | (Uganda) Jayden Onen | Forward Madison FC | MF | |
| 2 | (United States) Karsen Henderlong | Forward Madison FC | FW | |
| 2 | (United States) Ian Cerro | Forward Madison FC | Bench | |
| 3 | (United States) Brecc Evans | Spokane Velocity | DF | |
| 3 | (United States) Karsen Henderlong | Spokane Velocity | FW | |
| 3 | (United States) Lalo Delgado | Spokane Velocity | Bench | |
| 3 | (Spain) Marc Torrellas | Spokane Velocity | Bench | |
| 3 | (United States) Matt Poland | Spokane Velocity | Coach | |
| 5 | (United States) Jake Dengler | Texoma FC | DF | |
| 5 | (United States) Brecc Evans | Texoma FC | DF | |
| 5 | (Australia) Chris Heckenberg | Texoma FC | MF | |
| 5 | (United States) Karsen Henderlong | Texoma FC | FW | |
| 6 | (Colombia) Andrés Ferrín | Richmond Kickers | MF | |
| 6 | (United States) Karsen Henderlong | Richmond Kickers | Bench | |
| 7 | (United States) Brecc Evans | One Knoxville SC | DF | |
| 12 | (Nicaragua) Max Glasser | Union Omaha | DF | |
| 12 | (Uganda) Jayden Onen | Union Omaha | MF | |
| 12 | (Colombia) Andres Ferrin | Union Omaha | FW | |
| 12 | (United States) Matt Poland | Union Omaha | Coach | |
| 14 | (United States) Jake Dengler | Greenville Triumph SC | Defender | |
| 14 | (United States) Karsen Henderlong | Greenville Triumph SC | Forward | |
| 14 | (Colombia) Andrés Ferrín | Greenville Triumph SC | Bench | |
| 15 | (United States) Justin Weiss | Chattanooga Red Wolves SC | FW | |
| 17/18 | (Spain) Marc Torrellas | AV Alta FC | Bench | |
| 19 | (Spain) Marc Torrellas | Westchester SC | MF | |
| 19 | (United States) Karsen Henderlong | Westchester SC | FW | |
| 19 | (United States) Matt Poland | Westchester SC | Coach | |
| 20 | (United States) Julian Cisneros | AV Alta FC | DF | |
| 21/22 | (United States) Luka Prpa | Richmond Kickers | MF | |
| 21/22 | (Spain) Marc Torrellas | Richmond Kickers | Bench | |
| 23 | (United States) Matt Poland | South Georgia Tormenta FC and Texoma FC | Coach | |
| 23 | (United States) Jake Dengler | South Georgia Tormenta FC and Texoma FC | Bench | |
| 24 | (United States) Lalo Delgado | Forward Madison FC | Bench | |
| 26 | (Republic of Ireland) Kevin O'Connor | One Knoxville SC and Westchester SC | MF | |
| 26 | (United States) Karsen Henderlong | One Knoxville SC and Westchester SC | FW | |
| 27 | (United States) Karsen Henderlong | Greenville Triumph SC | Bench | |
| 28 | (United States) Matt Poland | Charlotte Independence | Coach | |
| 30 | (United States) Julian Cisneros | AV Alta FC | DF | |
| 30 | (Republic of Ireland) Kevin O'Connor | AV Alta FC | MF | |
| 30 | (United States) Lalo Delgado | AV Alta FC | Bench | |
| 30 | (Uganda) Jayden Onen | AV Alta FC | Bench | |
| 34 | (Spain) Marc Torrellas | Charlotte Independence | MF | |
| 34 | (United States) Karsen Henderlong | Charlotte Independence | FW | |
| 34 | (Nicaragua) Max Glasser | Charlotte Independence | Bench | |

=== USL Jägermeister Cup Team of the Round ===
| Round | Player | Opponent | Position | Ref |
|---|---|---|---|---|
| 1 | (United States) Karsen Henderlong | Charleston Battery | Bench | |

=== USL League One Goal of the Week ===
| Matchday | Player | Opponent | Ref |
|---|---|---|---|
| 12 | (Uganda) Jayden Onen | Union Omaha | |
| 14 | (United States) Karsen Henderlong | Greenville Triumph SC | |
| 19 | (United States) Karsen Henderlong | Westchester SC | |

=== USL League One Save of the Week ===
| Matchday | Player | Opponent | Ref |
|---|---|---|---|
| 30 | (United States) Lalo Delgado | AV Alta FC | |
| 31 | (United States) Lalo Delgado | Union Omaha | |

=== USL League One Player of the Month ===
| Player | Month | Reference |
|---|---|---|
| (United States) Karsen Henderlong | March | |

=== USL League One Coach of the Month ===
| Coach | Month | Reference |
|---|---|---|
| (United States) Matt Poland | March | |

=== USL Jägermeister Cup Save of the Round ===
| Round | Player | Opponent | Ref |
|---|---|---|---|
| 4 | (Puerto Rico) Joel Serrano | Greenville Triumph SC | |

=== USL League One Annual Awards ===
==== USL League One All-League Team honorees ====
| Player | Team | Position | Reference |
|---|---|---|---|
| (United States) Karsen Henderlong | First | FW | |
| (United States) Jake Dengler | Second | DF | |
| (United States) Brecc Evans | Second | DF | |
