= 2025 U.S. Open Cup =

110th edition of cup competition in American soccer

2025 Lamar Hunt U.S. Open Cup
Tournament details
- Country: United States
- Dates: March 18 – October 1
- Teams: 96

Final positions
- Champions: Nashville SC (1st title)
- Runners-up: Austin FC

Tournament statistics
- Matches played: 95
- Goals scored: 220 (2.32 per match)
- Top goal scorer(s): Sam Surridge (Nashville SC); 6 goals

The 2025 Lamar Hunt U.S. Open Cup was the 110th edition of the U.S. Open Cup, the knockout domestic cup competition of American soccer, organized by the United States Soccer Federation. It involved 96 teams, including 64 teams from all three professional tiers of the United States soccer league system, and 32 amateur teams in the "Open Division". The competition began on March 18 and culminated in the final on October 1. The defending champions, Los Angeles FC, were represented by their reserve team, and were eliminated in the second round by extension side AV Alta of USL League One.

The full format was announced on January 28, 2025. U.S. Soccer adopted new rules for the competition that restricted the use of alternative venues, and had random draws for hosting beginning in the Round of 16.

Of the 27 American clubs in Major League Soccer, 24 participated, with teams that were playing in the 2025 CONCACAF Champions Cup being represented by their reserve teams. The first teams entered in the round of 32 (the fourth round), while the eight affiliated reserve teams and the two independent teams from MLS Next Pro participated beginning in the first round. Atlanta United FC, Colorado Rapids, and expansion San Diego FC did not have any representation from their clubs in the 2025 U.S. Open Cup. Half of the MLS first team entrants hosted their first matches, while the rest began with an away game. The MLS Next Pro teams were able to field players from their senior MLS team's supplemental roster via loans. The USL Championship sent all 24 of its teams, with the highest sixteen rated teams of the 2024 regular season entering in the Third Round, and the eight lower-seeded teams entering in the first round alongside all 14 teams from USL League One. The 32 Open Division teams entered in the first round.

The winner, Nashville SC, qualified for the 2026 CONCACAF Champions Cup.

== Schedule ==
Schedule for 2025 Lamar Hunt U.S. Open Cup
Round	Draw date	Match day	Entrants	Teams entered to date
First Round	February 5, 2025	March 18–21	14 local qualifiers 1 National Amateur Cup champion 1 United Premier Soccer League Spring season champion 7 National Premier Soccer League teams 9 USL League Two teams 14 USL League One teams 10 MLS Next Pro teams 8 USL Championship teams	64 teams
Second Round	March 21, 2025	April 1–2	32 winners from First Round	64 teams
Third Round	April 3, 2025	April 15–16	16 winners from Second Round; 16 USL Championship teams	80 teams
Round of 32	April 17, 2025	May 6–7	16 winners from Third Round; 16 Major League Soccer teams	96 teams
Round of 16	April 17, 2025	May 20–21	16 winners from Round of 32	96 teams
Quarterfinals	May 22, 2025	July 8–9	8 winners from Round of 16	96 teams
Semifinals	May 22, 2025	September 16–17	4 winners from Quarterfinals	96 teams
Final		October 1	2 winners from Semifinals	96 teams

== Teams ==
=== Table ===
Enter in First Round				Enter in Third Round	Enter in Round of 32
Open Division		Division III	Division II		Division I
USASA/USSSA; 16 teams	NPSL/USL2; 16 teams	MLS Next Pro/USL1; 24 teams	USL Championship; 24 teams		MLS; 16 teams
National Amateur Cup: New York Pancyprian-Freedoms (APSL); UPSL Spring Champions: Soda City FC; Local Qualifiers: CD Faialense (BSSL); Foro SC (UPSL); Harbor City FC (UPSL); Harpos FC (CPL); International San Francisco (SFSFL); Laguna United FC (UPSL); Miami United FC (UPSL); New Jersey Alliance FC (UPSL); NY Renegades FC (UPSL); Southern Indiana FC (UPSL); Tulsa Athletic (UPSL); Virginia Dream FC (VSSL); West Chester United SC (USLPA); Washington Athletic Club (SRATS)	NPSL: Appalachian FC; Duluth FC; El Farolito SC $; FC Arizona; FC Motown; Naples United FC; New York Shockers; USL2: Asheville City SC; Ballard FC; Corpus Christi FC; Des Moines Menace; Flatirons FC; Little Rock Rangers; Long Island Rough Riders; Sarasota Paradise; Ventura County Fusion	MLS Next Pro: Carolina Core FC; Chattanooga FC; Columbus Crew 2; FC Cincinnati 2; Los Angeles FC 2; Inter Miami CF II; Real Monarchs; Sporting Kansas City II; Tacoma Defiance; Ventura County FC; USL1: AV Alta FC; Charlotte Independence; Chattanooga Red Wolves SC; FC Naples; Forward Madison FC; Greenville Triumph SC; One Knoxville SC; Portland Hearts of Pine; Richmond Kickers; South Georgia Tormenta FC; Spokane Velocity FC; Texoma FC; Union Omaha $; Westchester SC	Birmingham Legion FC; El Paso Locomotive FC; Hartford Athletic; Lexington SC; Loudoun United FC; Miami FC; Monterey Bay FC; FC Tulsa	Charleston Battery; Colorado Springs Switchbacks FC; Detroit City FC; Indy Eleven; Las Vegas Lights FC; Louisville City FC; New Mexico United; North Carolina FC; Oakland Roots SC; Orange County SC; Phoenix Rising FC; Pittsburgh Riverhounds SC $; Rhode Island FC; Sacramento Republic FC; San Antonio FC; Tampa Bay Rowdies	Austin FC $$; Charlotte FC; Chicago Fire FC; D.C. United; FC Dallas; Houston Dynamo FC; Minnesota United FC; Nashville SC $$$; New England Revolution; New York City FC; New York Red Bulls; Orlando City SC; Philadelphia Union; Portland Timbers; San Jose Earthquakes; St. Louis City SC

- $: Winner of $50,000 bonus for advancing the furthest in the competition from their respective divisions.
- $$: Winner of $250,000 for being the runner-up in the competition.
- $$$: Winner of $600,000 for winning the competition.

=== Map ===
Locations of teams in the tournament proper.
- MLS
- USLC
- Division 3 (MLSNP/USL1)
- Open Division (USL2/NPSL)
- Open Division (USASA/USSSA)
- Multiple Teams

Metro areas with multiple teams:

- Boston: New England Revolution (MLS), CD Faialense (BSSL)
- Chattanooga: Chattanooga FC (MLSNP), Chattanooga Red Wolves SC (USL1)
- Charlotte: Charlotte FC (MLS), Charlotte Independence (USL1)
- Dallas: FC Dallas (MLS), Foro SC (UPSL)
- Denver: Flatirons FC (USL2), Harpos FC (CPL)
- Los Angeles: Orange County SC (USLC), Los Angeles FC 2 (MLSNP), Ventura County FC (MLSNP), Laguna United FC (UPSL), Ventura County Fusion (USL2)
- Louisville: Louisville City FC (USLC), Southern Indiana FC (UPSL)
- Miami: Inter Miami CF II (MLSNP), Miami United FC (UPSL), Miami FC (USLC)
- Naples: FC Naples (USL1), Naples United FC (NPSL)
- New York City: New York City FC (MLS), New York Red Bulls (MLS), Westchester SC (USL1), FC Motown (NPSL), New York Pancyprian-Freedoms (EPSL), NY Renegades FC (UPSL)
- Philadelphia: Philadelphia Union (MLS), West Chester United SC (USLPA)
- Phoenix: Phoenix Rising FC (USLC), FC Arizona (NPSL)
- San Francisco Bay Area: San Jose Earthquakes (MLS), Oakland Roots SC (USLC), El Farolito SC (NPSL), International San Francisco (SFSFL)
- Seattle: Ballard FC (USL2), Washington Athletic Club (SRATS)
- Tulsa: FC Tulsa (USLC), Tulsa Athletic (UPSL)
- Washington D.C.: D.C. United (MLS), Loudoun United FC (USLC), Virginia Dream FC (VSSL)

=== Number of teams by state ===
A total of 36 states and D.C. were represented by clubs in the U.S. Open Cup this year.

States	Number	Teams
California	12	AV Alta FC, El Farolito SC, International San Francisco, Laguna United FC, Los Angeles FC 2, Monterey Bay FC, Oakland Roots SC, Orange County SC, Sacramento Republic FC, San Jose Earthquakes, Ventura County FC, Ventura County Fusion
Florida	9	FC Naples, Harbor City FC, Inter Miami CF II, Miami FC, Miami United FC, Naples United FC, Orlando City SC, Sarasota Paradise, Tampa Bay Rowdies
Texas	8	Austin FC, Corpus Christi FC, FC Dallas, El Paso Locomotive FC, Foro SC, Houston Dynamo FC, San Antonio FC, Texoma FC
North Carolina	6	Appalachian FC, Asheville City SC, Carolina Core FC, Charlotte FC, Charlotte Independence, North Carolina FC
New York	6	Long Island Rough Riders, New York City FC, New York Pancyprian-Freedoms, NY Renegades FC, New York Shockers, Westchester SC,
Tennessee	4	Chattanooga FC, Chattanooga Red Wolves SC, One Knoxville SC, Nashville SC
Washington	4	Ballard FC, Spokane Velocity FC, Tacoma Defiance, Washington Athletic Club
Colorado	3	Colorado Springs Switchbacks FC, Flatirons FC, Harpos FC
New Jersey	3	FC Motown, New Jersey Alliance FC, New York Red Bulls
Pennsylvania	3	Philadelphia Union, Pittsburgh Riverhounds SC, West Chester United SC
South Carolina	3	Charleston Battery, Greenville Triumph SC, Soda City FC
Virginia	3	Loudoun United FC, Richmond Kickers, Virginia Dream FC
Arizona	2	FC Arizona, Phoenix Rising FC
Indiana	2	Indy Eleven, Southern Indiana FC
Kentucky	2	Louisville City FC, Lexington SC
Massachusetts	2	CD Faialense, New England Revolution
Minnesota	2	Duluth FC, Minnesota United FC
Missouri	2	St. Louis City SC, Sporting Kansas City II
Ohio	2	Columbus Crew 2, FC Cincinnati 2
Oklahoma	2	FC Tulsa, Tulsa Athletic
Alabama	1	Birmingham Legion FC
Arkansas	1	Little Rock Rangers
Connecticut	1	Hartford Athletic
District of Columbia	1	D.C. United
Georgia	1	South Georgia Tormenta FC
Illinois	1	Chicago Fire FC
Iowa	1	Des Moines Menace
Maine	1	Portland Hearts of Pine
Michigan	1	Detroit City FC
Nebraska	1	Union Omaha
Nevada	1	Las Vegas Lights FC
New Mexico	1	New Mexico United
Oregon	1	Portland Timbers
Rhode Island	1	Rhode Island FC
Utah	1	Real Monarchs
Wisconsin	1	Forward Madison FC

=== Open Cup debuts ===
26 teams made their Open Cup debuts in the 2025 tournament.

- MLSNP: Columbus Crew 2, FC Cincinnati 2, Los Angeles FC 2, Inter Miami CF II, Real Monarchs, Sporting Kansas City II
- USL1: AV Alta FC, FC Naples, Portland Hearts of Pine, Texoma FC, Westchester SC
- NPSL: Naples United FC, New York Shockers
- USL2: Corpus Christi FC, Flatirons FC, Sarasota Paradise
- Local: CD Faialense, Harbour City FC, Laguna United FC, New Jersey Alliance FC, NY Renegades FC, Soda City FC, Southern Indiana FC, Virginia Dream FC, Washington Athletic Club

== Early rounds ==
=== Bracket ===
The first three rounds of the tournament bracket are shown below, with bold denoting the winners of each match.

First round March 18–21
**MLSNP**	**(Ohio) Columbus Crew 2**	**4**
UPSL	(New York (state)) NY Renegades FC	1
**USLC**	**(Kentucky) Lexington SC**	**5**
UPSL	Southern Indiana FC	0
**USL1**	**(Georgia (U.S. state)) South Georgia Tormenta FC**	**3**
UPSL	(Florida) Harbor City FC	0
USL1	(Texas) Texoma FC	1
**UPSL**	**(Texas) Foro SC**	**2**
**MLSNP**	**(Florida) Inter Miami CF II**	**4**
UPSL	(Florida) Miami United FC	2
**USLC**	**(Florida) Miami FC**	**4**
NPSL	(Florida) Naples United FC	1
USL2	(New York (state)) Long Island Rough Riders	2
**USL1**	**(North Carolina) Charlotte Independence**	**3**
**MLSNP**	**(North Carolina) Carolina Core FC**	**4**
UPSL	(South Carolina) Soda City FC	2
**USLC**	**(California) Monterey Bay FC**	**4**
SFSFL	(California) International San Francisco	0
MLSNP	(Utah) Real Monarchs	1
**NPSL**	**(California) El Farolito SC**	**3**
**USL1**	**(California) AV Alta FC**	**3**
USL2	(California) Ventura County Fusion	1
**MLSNP**	**(California) Los Angeles FC 2**	**7**
NPSL	FC Arizona	1
USLPA	(Pennsylvania) West Chester United SC	2
**USLC**	**(Virginia) Loudoun United FC**	**3**
USL1	(Virginia) Richmond Kickers	1
**VSSL**	**Virginia Dream FC**	**3**
**USL1**	**(Maine) Portland Hearts of Pine**	**4**
BSSL	(Massachusetts) CD Faialense	0
**USLC**	**(Connecticut) Hartford Athletic**	**3**
NPSL	(New York (state)) New York Shockers	0
NPSL	(New Jersey) FC Motown	0
**USL1**	**(New York (state)) Westchester SC**	**1**
MLSNP	(Ohio) FC Cincinnati 2	0 (4)
**EPSL**	**(New York (state)) New York Pancyprian-Freedoms**	**0 (5)**
**MLSNP**	**(Tennessee) Chattanooga FC**	**1**
USL2	(Texas) Corpus Christi FC	0
UPSL	New Jersey Alliance FC	2 (2)
**USL1**	**(Tennessee) Chattanooga Red Wolves SC**	**2 (4)**
USL2	(North Carolina) Asheville City SC	0 (3)
**USL1**	**(South Carolina) Greenville Triumph SC**	**0 (4)**
NPSL	(North Carolina) Appalachian FC	0
**USL1**	**(Tennessee) One Knoxville SC**	**3**
USL2	(Florida) Sarasota Paradise	1
**USL1**	**(Florida) FC Naples**	**2**
**USL2**	**(Arkansas) Little Rock Rangers**	**1**
USLC	(Alabama) Birmingham Legion FC	0
**USL1**	**(Wisconsin) Forward Madison FC**	**5**
NPSL	(Minnesota) Duluth FC	1
UPSL	(Oklahoma) Tulsa Athletic	0
**USLC**	**(Oklahoma) FC Tulsa**	**1**
MLSNP	(Missouri) Sporting Kansas City II	1
**USL2**	**(Iowa) Des Moines Menace**	**2**
USL2	(Colorado) Flatirons FC	1
**USL1**	**(Nebraska) Union Omaha**	**2**
**MLSNP**	**(Washington (state)) Tacoma Defiance**	**3**
SRATS	(Washington (state)) Washington Athletic Club	1
USL2	(Washington (state)) Ballard FC	0
**USL1**	**(Washington (state)) Spokane Velocity FC**	**1**
**MLSNP**	**(California) Ventura County FC**	**7**
UPSL	(California) Laguna United FC	0
**USLC**	**(Texas) El Paso Locomotive FC**	**5**
CPL	(Colorado) Harpos FC	1

Second round April 1–2
**MLSNP**	**(Ohio) Columbus Crew 2**	**3**
USLC	(Kentucky) Lexington SC	0
**USL1**	**(Georgia (U.S. state)) South Georgia Tormenta FC**	**3**
UPSL	(Texas) Foro SC	2
MLSNP	(Florida) Inter Miami CF II	0
**USLC**	**(Florida) Miami FC**	**1**
**USL1**	**(North Carolina) Charlotte Independence**	**2**
MLSNP	(North Carolina) Carolina Core FC	1
USLC	(California) Monterey Bay FC	1
**NPSL**	**(California) El Farolito SC**	**2**
**USL1**	**(California) AV Alta FC**	**2**
MLSNP	(California) Los Angeles FC 2	1
**USLC**	**(Virginia) Loudoun United FC**	**4**
VSSL	Virginia Dream FC	2
**USL1**	**(Maine) Portland Hearts of Pine**	**1 (4)**
USLC	(Connecticut) Hartford Athletic	1 (2)
**USL1**	**(New York (state)) Westchester SC**	**3**
EPSL	(New York (state)) New York Pancyprian-Freedoms	2
MLSNP	(Tennessee) Chattanooga FC	1 (3)
**USL1**	**(Tennessee) Chattanooga Red Wolves SC**	**1 (4)**
USL1	(South Carolina) Greenville Triumph SC	1
**USL1**	**(Tennessee) One Knoxville SC**	**3**
**USL1**	**(Florida) FC Naples**	**3**
USL2	(Arkansas) Little Rock Rangers	0
USL1	(Wisconsin) Forward Madison FC	1
**USLC**	**(Oklahoma) FC Tulsa**	**3**
USL2	(Iowa) Des Moines Menace	1
**USL1**	**(Nebraska) Union Omaha**	**2**
**MLSNP**	**(Washington (state)) Tacoma Defiance**	**2**
USL1	(Washington (state)) Spokane Velocity FC	1
MLSNP	(California) Ventura County FC	0
**USLC**	**(Texas) El Paso Locomotive**	**3**

Third round April 15–16
MLSNP	(Ohio) Columbus Crew 2	0
**USLC**	**(Pennsylvania) Pittsburgh Riverhounds SC**	**1**
**USLC**	**(South Carolina) Charleston Battery**	**4**
USL1	(Georgia (U.S. state)) South Georgia Tormenta FC	0
**USLC**	**(Indiana) Indy Eleven**	**1**
USLC	(Florida) Miami FC	0
USL1	(North Carolina) Charlotte Independence	1
**USLC**	**North Carolina FC**	**3**
**USLC**	**(California) Sacramento Republic FC**	**1**
NPSL	(California) El Farolito SC	0
**USL1**	**(California) AV Alta FC**	**2 (4)**
USLC	(California) Orange County SC	2 (2)
**USLC**	**(Kentucky) Louisville City FC**	**2**
USLC	(Virginia) Loudoun United FC	1
USL1	(Maine) Portland Hearts of Pine	1
**USLC**	**Rhode Island FC**	**2**
**USLC**	**(Michigan) Detroit City FC**	**3**
USL1	(New York (state)) Westchester SC	1
USLC	(Nevada) Las Vegas Lights FC	2 (3)
**USL1**	**(Tennessee) Chattanooga Red Wolves SC**	**2 (4)**
**USLC**	**Colorado Springs Switchbacks FC**	**3**
USL1	(Tennessee) One Knoxville SC	2
USL1	(Florida) FC Naples	1 (8)
**USLC**	**(Florida) Tampa Bay Rowdies**	**1 (9)**
USLC	(Oklahoma) FC Tulsa	1 (2)
**USLC**	**(Arizona) Phoenix Rising FC**	**1 (4)**
**USL1**	**(Nebraska) Union Omaha**	**1**
USLC	(Texas) San Antonio FC	0
**MLSNP**	**(Washington (state)) Tacoma Defiance**	**2**
USLC	(California) Oakland Roots SC	1
USLC	New Mexico United	2 (1)
**USLC**	**(Texas) El Paso Locomotive**	**2 (4)**

Host team listed first
Bold = winner

=== First round ===
The complete draw for the first round, including match dates and times, was announced on February 6, 2025.

March 18	**Hartford Athletic (USLC) (Connecticut)**	**3–0**	**(New York (state))** New York Shockers (NPSL)	Hartford, Connecticut
6:30 p.m. EDT	Obalola 12'; Dieng 38'; Ngalina 87'	Report		Stadium: Trinity Health Stadium; Attendance: 2,287; Referee: Johnathan Luk

March 18	Sarasota Paradise (USL2) **(Florida)**	**1–2**	**(Florida) FC Naples (USL1)**	Lakewood Ranch, Florida
7:00 p.m. EDT	Salgado 88'	Report	Henderlong 79'; O'Connor 90+1'	Stadium: Premier Sports Campus; Attendance: 2,248; Referee: Mazdid Coric

March 18	**Miami FC (USLC) (Florida)**	**4–1**	**(Florida)** Naples United FC (NPSL)	Miami, Florida
7:00 p.m. EDT	Bonfiglio 41', 45+1'; Gavilanes 66'; Zárate 69'	Report	Moreno 83'	Stadium: FIU Soccer Stadium; Attendance: 542; Referee: Edson Carvajal

March 18	New Jersey Alliance FC (UPSL) **(New Jersey)**	**2–2** (a.e.t.) (**2–4** p)	**(Tennessee) Chattanooga Red Wolves SC (USL1)**	Newark, New Jersey
7:00 p.m. EDT	Preciado 45+1'; Quist 90+2'	Report	Bentley 65' (pen.), 84'	Stadium: Lubetkin Field; Attendance: 200; Referee: Danielle Cornetta
	**Penalties**
	Quist (penalty scored); Villegas (penalty missed); Rodzen (penalty missed); Hurtado (penalty scored)		(penalty scored) Bentley; (penalty scored) Ualefi; (penalty scored) Smith; (penalty scored) Green

March 18	FC Motown (NPSL) **(New Jersey)**	**0–1**	**(New York (state)) Westchester SC (USL1)**	Montclair, New Jersey
7:30 p.m. EDT		Report	Obregón 81' (pen.)	Stadium: MSU Soccer Park at Pittser Field; Attendance: 534; Referee: Caleb Firl

March 18	Asheville City SC (USL2) **(North Carolina)**	**0–0** (a.e.t.) (**3–4** p)	**(South Carolina) Greenville Triumph SC (USL1)**	Asheville, North Carolina
7:30 p.m. EDT		Report		Stadium: Greenwood Field; Attendance: 1,000; Referee: John Rush
	**Penalties**
	Obara (penalty scored); Morgan (penalty scored); Strömsten (penalty missed); Lyons (penalty scored); Fenwick (penalty missed)		(penalty scored) Evans; (penalty scored) Polak; (penalty scored) Fricke; (penalty missed) Mensah; (penalty scored) Velásquez

March 18	West Chester United SC (USLPA) **(Pennsylvania)**	**2–3**	**(Virginia) Loudoun United FC (USLC)**	Wayne, Pennsylvania
7:30 p.m. EDT	Elkahloun 18' (pen.); Roby 68'	Report	Bidois 37', 61'; Sorto 49' (pen.)	Stadium: YSC Sports; Attendance: 120; Referee: Joshua Encarnación

March 18	Texoma FC (USL1) **(Texas)**	**1–2** (a.e.t.)	**(Texas) Foro SC (UPSL)**	Sherman, Texas
7:00 p.m. CDT	McManus 59'	Report	Padilla 15' (pen.), 99'	Stadium: Historic Bearcat Stadium; Attendance: 350; Referee: Reyes Vargas

March 18	Tulsa Athletic (TLFC) **(Oklahoma)**	**0–1**	**(Oklahoma) FC Tulsa (USLC)**	Tulsa, Oklahoma
7:30 p.m. CDT		Report	Calheira 84' (pen.)	Stadium: Athletic Community Field at Hicks Park; Referee: Rodrigo Albuquerque

March 18	**AV Alta FC (USL1) (California)**	**3–1**	**(California)** Ventura County Fusion (USL2)	Lancaster, California
7:30 p.m. PDT	Desdunes 28', 45+3' (pen.); Cruz 52'	Report	Fofanah 42'	Stadium: Lancaster Municipal Stadium; Attendance: 2,453; Referee: Felix Granados

March 18	**Ventura County FC (MLSNP) (California)**	**7–0**	**(California)** Laguna United FC (UPSL)	Carson, California
7:30 p.m. PDT	Essengue 18'; Bibout 41', 52', 68'; Bucknor 61'; Müller 63'; Nicholson 89' (o.g.)	Report		Stadium: Dignity Health Sports Park; Attendance: 200; Referee: Rafael Bonilla

March 19	**Columbus Crew 2 (MLSNP) (Ohio)**	**4–1**	**(New York (state))** NY Renegades (UPSL)	Columbus, Ohio
6:00 p.m. EDT	Ferdinand 44'; Adu-Gyamfi 45+3', 69'; Brown 62'	Report	Silveira 79'	Stadium: Lower.com Field; Attendance: 620; Referee: Atahan Yaya

March 19	**Chattanooga FC (MLSNP) (Tennessee)**	**1–0** (a.e.t.)	**(Texas)** Corpus Christi FC (USL2)	Chattanooga, Tennessee
6:30 p.m. EDT	Naglestad 112'	Report		Stadium: Finley Stadium; Attendance: 2,075; Referee: Wes Caouette

March 19	Appalachian FC (NPSL) **(North Carolina)**	**0–3**	**(Tennessee) One Knoxville SC (USL1)**	Boone, North Carolina
7:00 p.m. EDT		Report	Santos 16'; Diene 63'; McLeod 74'	Stadium: ASU Soccer Stadium; Attendance: 2,452; Referee: Josiah Parke

March 19	Richmond Kickers (USL1) **(Virginia)**	**1–3**	**Virginia Dream FC (VSSL)**	Richmond, Virginia
7:00 p.m. EDT	Vaughan 36'	Report	Lukulia 8' (pen.); Suchecki 53'; Akinkoye 61'	Stadium: City Stadium; Attendance: 1,765; Referee: John Griggs

March 19	**Inter Miami CF II (MLSNP) (Florida)**	**4–2**	**(Florida)** Miami United FC (UPSL)	Fort Lauderdale, Florida
7:00 p.m. EDT	Zeltzer-Zubida 49'; Saja 65'; Cohen 70', 81'	Report	Frean 36'; Luzuriaga 83'	Stadium: Chase Stadium; Attendance: 1,500; Referee: Alejo Calume

March 19	Sporting Kansas City II (MLSNP) **(Missouri)**	**1–2**	**(Iowa) Des Moines Menace (USL2)**	Kansas City, Missouri
6:30 p.m. CDT	Uderitz 65'	Report	Kljestan 57' (pen.), 74' (pen.)	Stadium: Swope Soccer Village; Attendance: 817; Referee: Velemir Stefanovic

March 19	**Lexington SC (USLC) (Kentucky)**	**5–0**	**(Indiana)** Southern Indiana FC (UPSL)	Lexington, Kentucky
7:30 p.m. EDT	Burke 13'; Goldthorp 42'; Midence 46'; Stauffer 53'; Rodrigues 80'	Report		Stadium: Lexington SC Stadium; Attendance: 1,835; Referee: Rogelio Alvarez

March 19	**Little Rock Rangers (USL2) (Arkansas)**	**1–0**	**(Alabama)** Birmingham Legion (USLC)	Little Rock, Arkansas
7:00 p.m. CDT	McConnell 48'	Report		Stadium: Episcopal Collegiate School; Attendance: 1,328; Referee: Deshun Beard

March 19	**El Paso Locomotive FC (USLC) (Texas)**	**5–1**	**(Colorado)** Harpos FC (CPL)	El Paso, Texas
7:00 p.m. MDT	Avila 12'; Romero 37', 45+2'; Fidelak 54' (o.g.); Torres 59'	Report	Debuire 65'	Stadium: Southwest University Park; Attendance: 1,565; Referee: Melvin Rivas

March 19	Real Monarchs (MLSNP) **(Utah)**	**1–3** (a.e.t.)	**(California) El Farolito (NPSL)**	Herriman, Utah
7:30 p.m. MDT	Riquelme 58'	Report	Benson 18'; Soto 114' (pen.); Villalta 120+5'	Stadium: Zions Bank Stadium; Attendance: 496; Referee: Nathan Boone

March 19	**Monterey Bay FC (USLC) (California)**	**4–0**	**(California)** International San Francisco (SFSFL)	Seaside, California
7:00 p.m. PDT	Fehr 2'; Gnaulati 26', 45+2'; Paul 84'	Report		Stadium: Cardinale Stadium; Attendance: 968; Referee: Robert Vincze

March 19	Ballard FC (USL2) **(Washington (state))**	**0–1** (a.e.t.)	**(Washington (state)) Spokane Velocity FC (USL1)**	Seattle, Washington
7:30 p.m. PDT		Report	Peláez 120+1'	Stadium: Interbay Stadium; Attendance: 1,508; Referee: Kelsey Harms

March 19	**Los Angeles FC 2 (MLSNP) (California)**	**7–1**	**(Arizona)** FC Arizona (NPSL)	Fullerton, California
7:30 p.m. PDT	Evans 2', 65'; Terry 27', 48'; Mihalić 42'; Nava 82'; Walters 90+3'	Report	Waters 59'	Stadium: Titan Stadium; Attendance: 300; Referee: Steven Cardozo

March 20	**Portland Hearts of Pine (USL1) (Maine)**	**4–0**	**(Massachusetts)** CD Faialense (BSSL)	Lewiston, Maine
6:30 p.m. EDT	Varela 17'; Liadi 29', 62'; Messer 68'	Report		Stadium: Franklin Athletic Complex; Attendance: 3,500; Referee: Andrew Porada

March 20	Long Island Rough Riders (USL2) **(New York (state))**	**2–3** (a.e.t.)	**(North Carolina) Charlotte Independence (USL1)**	Uniondale, New York
7:00 p.m. EDT	Woznicki 49'; Khodri 105+1'	Report	Jauregui 79', 107'; Chaney 104'	Stadium: Mitchel Athletic Complex; Attendance: 719; Referee: Ignacio Guzman

March 20	**Forward Madison FC (USL1) (Wisconsin)**	**5–1**	**(Minnesota)** Duluth FC (NPSL)	Madison, Wisconsin
6:00 p.m. CDT	Sousa 39'; Munjoma 73'; Galindrez 86', 90+6'; Murphy 90+3'	Report	Fernandez 64'	Stadium: Breese Stevens Field; Referee: Peter Bernardy

March 20	**South Georgia Tormenta FC (USL1) (Georgia (U.S. state))**	**3–0**	**(Florida)** Harbor City FC (UPSL)	Statesboro, Georgia
7:00 p.m. EDT	Nyandjo 23'; Reid-Stephen 75', 80'	Report		Stadium: Tormenta Stadium; Attendance: 667; Referee: Amin Hadzic

March 20	**Carolina Core FC (MLSNP) (North Carolina)**	**4–2**	**(South Carolina)** Soda City FC (UPSL)	High Point, North Carolina
7:30 p.m. EDT	Jo. Rodríguez 18' (pen.), 58'; Canete 69'; Evans 72'	Report	Thompson 79'; Salifu 83'	Stadium: Truist Point; Attendance: 2,511; Referee: Joe Surgan

March 20	FC Cincinnati 2 (MLSNP) **(Ohio)**	**0–0** (a.e.t.) (**4–5** p)	**(New York (state)) New York Pancyprian-Freedoms (EPSL)**	Highland Heights, Kentucky
7:30 p.m. EDT		Report		Stadium: NKU Soccer Stadium; Attendance: 209; Referee: Salvador Flores
	**Penalties**
	Ikoba (penalty scored); Chávez (penalty scored); Machado (penalty scored); Schaefer (penalty scored); Kristel (penalty missed); Kuisel (penalty missed)		(penalty scored) Holland; (penalty missed) Argudo; (penalty scored) Rosero; (penalty scored) Sluys; (penalty scored) Bailon; (penalty scored) Hoff

March 20	**Tacoma Defiance (MLSNP) (Washington (state))**	**3–1**	**(Washington (state))** Washington Athletic Club (SRATS)	Tukwila, Washington
7:00 p.m. PDT	Carli 37'; Tsukanome 47', 71'	Report	O'Brien 9'	Stadium: Starfire Sports Complex; Attendance: 205; Referee: Alex Wolbert

March 21	Flatirons FC (USL2) **(Colorado)**	**1–2**	**(Nebraska) Union Omaha (USL1)**	Golden, Colorado
7:00 p.m. MDT	Andrews 84'	Report	Gómez 28'; Gallardo 73' (pen.)	Stadium: Stermole Soccer Stadium; Attendance: 200; Referee: Lukasz Jozefecki

=== Second round ===
April 1	**Columbus Crew 2 (MLSNP) (Ohio)**	**3–0**	(Kentucky) Lexington SC (USLC)	Columbus, Ohio
6:00 p.m. EDT	Presthus 7'; Ortiz 65'; Adu-Gyamfi 90+4'	Report		Stadium: Lower.com Field; Attendance: 378; Referee: Salvador Flores

April 1	**South Georgia Tormenta FC (USL1) (Georgia (U.S. state))**	**3–2**	(Texas) Foro SC (UPSL)	Statesboro, Georgia
7:00 p.m. EDT	Walker 38'; Bazini 85'; Vivas 90+4'	Report	Rayo 67'; Padilla 90+2' (pen.)	Stadium: Tormenta Stadium; Attendance: 467; Referee: Josiah Parke

April 1	Inter Miami CF II (MLSNP) (Florida)	**0–1**	**(Florida) Miami FC (USLC)**	Fort Lauderdale, Florida
7:30 p.m. EDT		Report	Bonfiglio 84'	Stadium: Chase Stadium; Attendance: 1,500; Referee: Johnathan Bilinski

April 1	**Charlotte Independence (USL1) (North Carolina)**	**2–1** (a.e.t.)	**(North Carolina)** Carolina Core FC (MLSNP)	Matthews, North Carolina
7:30 p.m. EDT	Álvarez 2'; Marou 93'	Report	Jo. Rodríguez 10'	Stadium: Sportsplex at Matthews; Referee: John Rush

April 1	Monterey Bay FC (USLC) **(California)**	**1–2**	**(California) El Farolito SC (NPSL)**	Seaside, California
7:00 p.m. PDT	Gnaulati 28' (pen.)	Report	Zuluaga 57'; Kreye 83'	Stadium: Cardinale Stadium; Attendance: 688; Referee: Esad Omanovic

April 1	**AV Alta FC (USL1) (California)**	**2–1** (a.e.t.)	**(California)** Los Angeles FC 2 (MLSNP)	Lancaster, California
7:30 p.m. PDT	Alaribe 80'; Villalobos 120'	Report	Guerra 64'	Stadium: Lancaster Municipal Stadium; Attendance: 2,735; Referee: Servando Berna Rico

April 2	**Loudoun United FC (USLC) (Virginia)**	**4–2**	Virginia Dream FC (VSSL)	Leesburg, Virginia
6:30 p.m. EDT	Bidois 42'; Mines 59'; Ryan 77', 90+2'	Report	Akinkoye 50'; Likulia 86'	Stadium: Segra Field; Attendance: 1,048; Referee: Marie Durr

April 2	**Portland Hearts of Pine (USL1) (Maine)**	**1–1** (a.e.t.) (**4–2** p)	(Connecticut) Hartford Athletic (USLC)	Lewiston, Maine
6:30 p.m. EDT	Keegan 117'	Report	Scarlett 107'	Stadium: Franklin Athletic Complex; Attendance: 3,002; Referee: Kyle Averill
	**Penalties**
	Langlois (penalty scored); Keegan (penalty scored); Messer (penalty scored); Southern (penalty scored)		(penalty scored) Farrell; (penalty scored) Dieng; (penalty missed) Anderson; (penalty missed) Ngalina

April 2	**Westchester SC (USL1) (New York (state))**	**3–2**	(New York (state)) New York Pancyprian-Freedoms (EPSL)	Mount Vernon, New York
7:00 p.m. EDT	Obregón 3'; Sluys 22' (o.g.); Bouman 34'	Report	Martín 54'; Thristino 90+1'	Stadium: The Stadium at Memorial Field; Attendance: 2,026

April 2	Chattanooga FC (MLSNP) (Tennessee)	**1–1** (a.e.t.) (**4–5** p)	**(Tennessee) Chattanooga Red Wolves SC (USL1)**	Chattanooga, Tennessee
7:00 p.m. EDT	Mangarov 19'	Report	Hernandez 7'	Stadium: Finley Stadium; Attendance: 12,131; Referee: Richonne Clark
	**Penalties**
	Mangarov (penalty missed); Screen (penalty scored); Naglestad (penalty scored); Sar-Sar (penalty scored); Dudley (penalty scored)		(penalty scored) Bentley; (penalty scored) Vazquez; (penalty scored) Filipe; (penalty scored) Hernández; (penalty scored) Green

April 2	Greenville Triumph SC (USL1) (South Carolina)	**1–3**	**(Tennessee) One Knoxville SC (USL1)**	Greenville, South Carolina
7:00 p.m. EDT	Mensah 55'	Report	Zarokostas 14'; Doyle 23'; Diene 90+5'	Stadium: Paladin Stadium; Attendance: 854; Referee: Izlen Peksenar

April 2	**FC Naples (USL1) (Florida)**	**3–0**	(Arkansas) Little Rock Rangers (USL2)	Naples, Florida
7:30 p.m. EDT	Onen 1'; Evans 14'; Ferrín 77'	Report		Stadium: Paradise Coast Sports Complex; Attendance: 2,174; Referee: Edson Caravajal

April 2	Forward Madison FC (USL1) (Wisconsin)	**1–3**	**(Oklahoma) FC Tulsa (USLC)**	Madison, Wisconsin
6:30 p.m. CDT	Bartman 68'	Report	Damm 21'; ElMedkhar 31'; Calheira 51' (pen.)	Stadium: Breese Stevens Field; Attendance: 832; Referee: Felix Granados

April 2	Des Moines Menace (USL2) (Iowa)	**1–2**	**(Nebraska) Union Omaha (USL1)**	West Des Moines, Iowa
7:30 p.m. CDT	Feilhaber 55' (pen.)	Report	Acoff 18'; Gómez 33'	Stadium: Valley Stadium; Attendance: 1,000; Referee: Christian Campo Hernandez

April 2	**Tacoma Defiance (MLSNP) (Washington (state))**	**2–1**	(Washington (state)) Spokane Velocity FC (USL1)	Tukwila, Washington
7:00 p.m. PDT	Kang 3'; Lage 99' (o.g.)	Report	Gil 78'	Stadium: Starfire Sports Complex; Attendance: 2,300; Referee: Christopher Calderon

April 2	Ventura County FC (MLSNP) (California)	**0–3**	**(Texas) El Paso Locomotive FC (USLC)**	Thousand Oaks, California
7:30 p.m. PDT		Report	Carter 17'; Vásquez 29'; Cabrera Jr. 81'	Stadium: Dignity Health Sports Park Track & Field Stadium; Attendance: 50; Referee: Steven Cardozo

=== Third round ===
The complete draw for the third round, including match dates and times, took place on April 3, 2025.

April 15	Columbus Crew 2 (MLSNP) (Ohio)	**0–1**	**(Pennsylvania) Pittsburgh Riverhounds SC (USLC)**	Columbus, Ohio
6:00 p.m. EDT		Report	Griffin 28'	Stadium: Lower.com Field; Attendance: 376; Referee: Rogelio Alvarez

April 15	**Louisville City FC (USLC) (Kentucky)**	**2–1**	(Virginia) Loudoun United FC (USLC)	Louisville, Kentucky
7:00 p.m. EDT	Perez 18'; Gleadle 28'	Report	Aboukoura 90'	Stadium: Lynn Family Stadium; Attendance: 2,642; Referee: Elivis Osmanovic

April 15	Charlotte Independence (USL1) (North Carolina)	**1–3**	**North Carolina FC (USLC)**	Matthews, North Carolina
7:00 p.m. EDT	Bakero 48'	Report	Anderson 71'; da Costa 74', 77'	Stadium: Sportsplex at Matthews; Attendance: 584; Referee: Danielle Chesney

April 15	Portland Hearts of Pine (USL1) (Maine)	**1–2**	**Rhode Island FC (USLC)**	Lewiston, Maine
7:00 p.m. EDT	Washington 65'	Report	Holstad 34'; Nodarse 37'	Stadium: Franklin Athletic Complex; Attendance: 2,933; Referee: Thomas Snyder

April 15	**Charleston Battery (USLC) (South Carolina)**	**4–0**	(Georgia (U.S. state)) South Georgia Tormenta FC (USL1)	Mount Pleasant, South Carolina
7:30 p.m. EDT	Allan 32'; Myers 45+1', 52', 70'	Report		Stadium: Ralph Lundy Field; Attendance: 1,419; Referee: John Rush

April 15	**Union Omaha (USL1) (Nebraska)**	**1–0**	(Texas) San Antonio FC (USLC)	Omaha, Nebraska
7:00 p.m. CDT	Acoff 36'	Report		Stadium: Caniglia Field; Attendance: 1,112; Referee: Drew Klemp

April 15	**AV Alta FC (USL1) (California)**	**2–2** (a.e.t.) (**4–2** p)	(California) Orange County SC (USLC)	Lancaster, California
7:00 p.m. PDT	Mastrantonio 67'; Alaribe 75'	Report	Sylla 15'; War 83'	Stadium: Lancaster Municipal Stadium; Attendance: 3,287; Referee: Brandon Stevis
	**Penalties**
	Cerritos (penalty scored); Blancos (penalty scored); Cruz (penalty scored); Pajaro (penalty scored)		(penalty scored) Dunbar; (penalty scored) MacKinnon; (penalty missed) Scott; (penalty missed) Benalcazar

April 15	**Tacoma Defiance (MLSNP) (Washington (state))**	**2–1** (a.e.t.)	(California) Oakland Roots SC (USLC)	Tukwila, Washington
7:30 p.m. PDT	Kingston 28'; De Rosario 108'	Report	Hackshaw 75' (pen.)	Stadium: Starfire Sports Complex; Attendance: 281; Referee: Dion Coxe

April 16	**Detroit City FC (USLC) (Michigan)**	**3–1**	(New York (state)) Westchester SC (USL1)	Hamtramck, Michigan
7:00 p.m. EDT	Doner 71'; Cedeno 85'; Smith 90+4'	Report	Obregón 76'	Stadium: Keyworth Stadium; Attendance: 2,079; Referee: Edson Carvajal

April 16	FC Naples (USL1) (Florida)	**1–1** (a.e.t.) (**8–9** p)	**(Florida) Tampa Bay Rowdies (USLC)**	Naples, Florida
7:00 p.m. EDT	Prpa 27'	Report	Niyongabire 26'	Stadium: Paradise Coast Sports Complex; Attendance: 3,418; Referee: Muhammad Hassan
	**Penalties**
	Henderlong (penalty scored); Onen (penalty scored); Dengler (penalty scored); Heckenberg (penalty missed); Cerro (penalty scored); Pasnik (penalty scored); Evans (penalty scored); Torrellas (penalty scored); Fernandes (penalty scored); Cisneros (penalty missed)		Bassett (penalty scored); Fernandes (penalty missed); MacPherson (penalty scored); Crisotomo (penalty scored); Pacius (penalty scored); Mustali (penalty scored); Castellanos (penalty scored); Skinner (penalty scored); Vancaeyezeele (penalty scored); Lasso (penalty scored)

April 16	**Indy Eleven (USLC) (Indiana)**	**1–0** (a.e.t.)	(Florida) Miami FC (USLC)	Indianapolis, Indiana
7:30 p.m. EDT	White 120+3'	Report		Stadium: Michael A. Carroll Stadium; Attendance: 4,366; Referee: Calin Radosav

April 16	FC Tulsa (USLC) (Oklahoma)	**1–1** (a.e.t.) (**2–4** p)	**(Arizona) Phoenix Rising FC (USLC)**	Tulsa, Oklahoma
7:00 p.m. CDT	Lukic 86'	Report	Margaritha 51'	Stadium: Hurricane Soccer & Track Stadium; Attendance: 704; Referee: Rodrigo Albuquerque
	**Penalties**
	ElMedkhar (penalty missed); Bettache (penalty missed); Rogers (penalty scored); Colli (penalty scored)		(penalty scored) Cuello; (penalty scored) Scearce; (penalty scored) Walls; (penalty scored) Sainté

April 16	**Colorado Springs Switchbacks FC (USLC)**	**3–2** (a.e.t.)	(Tennessee) One Knoxville SC (USL1)	Colorado Springs, Colorado
7:00 p.m. MDT	Echevarria 49'; Micaletto 81'; Fontana 103'	Report	Diene 2'; Zarokostas 83'	Stadium: Weidner Field; Attendance: 2,500; Referee: Jay Schlesinger

April 16	New Mexico United (USLC)	**2–2** (a.e.t.) (**1–4** p)	**(Texas) El Paso Locomotive (USLC)**	Albuquerque, New Mexico
7:30 p.m. MDT	Vargas 39'; Lindsey 72'	Report	Carter 21'; Cabrera Jr. 90+7'	Stadium: UNM Soccer Complex; Attendance: 2,124; Referee: John Griggs
	**Penalties**
	Zelalem (penalty missed); Maples (penalty scored); Ryden (penalty missed)		(penalty scored) Coronado; (penalty scored) Ruiz; (penalty scored) Torres; (penalty scored) Cabrera Jr.

April 16	**Sacramento Republic FC (USLC) (California)**	**1–0**	(California) El Farolito SC (NPSL)	Sacramento, California
7:00 p.m. PDT	Herrera 29'	Report		Stadium: Heart Health Park; Attendance: 2,727; Referee: Robert Vincze

April 16	Las Vegas Lights FC (USLC) (Nevada)	**2–2** (a.e.t.) (**3–4** p)	**(Tennessee) Chattanooga Red Wolves SC (USL1)**	Las Vegas, Nevada
7:30 p.m. PDT	Azcona 43'; Pinzón 62'	Report	Vazquez 19'; Hernández 48' (pen.)	Stadium: Cashman Field; Attendance: 1,061; Referee: Jaclyn Metz
	**Penalties**
	Pinzón (penalty missed); Pearson (penalty scored); O'Driscoll (penalty scored); Noël (penalty scored); Nigro (penalty missed)		(penalty scored) Bentley; (penalty missed) Ualefi; (penalty scored) Hernandez; (penalty scored) Hernández; (penalty scored) Green

== Round of 32 and 16 ==
The draw for the round of 32 and round of 16 took place live on CBS Sports Golazo Network on April 17, 2025, performed by CBS Sports Golazo Network presenter Aly Trost Martin and U.S. Open Cup commissioner David Applegate. The teams were divided into eight broadly geographical groups named for the eight most-capped United States men's national team players who had also won a U.S. Open Cup: Cobi Jones, Landon Donovan, Clint Dempsey, Jeff Agoos, DaMarcus Beasley, Carlos Bocanegra, Paul Caligiuri and Kasey Keller. The winners of the four-team mini-bracket advanced to the quarterfinals. The order in which teams were drawn for the round of 32 determined the priority order for home field advantage in the round of 16.

=== Teams ===
Teams for Round of 32 draw
Previous round winners	New entrants (MLS)
AV Alta FC (USL1); Charleston Battery (USLC); Chattanooga Red Wolves SC (USL1); Colorado Springs Switchbacks (USLC); Detroit City FC (USLC); El Paso Locomotive FC (USLC); Indy Eleven (USLC); Louisville City FC (USLC); North Carolina FC (USLC); Phoenix Rising FC (USLC); Pittsburgh Riverhounds SC (USLC); Rhode Island FC (USLC); Sacramento Republic FC (USLC); Tacoma Defiance (MLSNP); Tampa Bay Rowdies (USLC); Union Omaha (USL1)	**Austin FC**; Charlotte FC; **Chicago Fire FC**; **D.C. United**; **FC Dallas**; Houston Dynamo FC; Minnesota United FC; **Nashville SC**; New England Revolution; New York City FC; New York Red Bulls; Orlando City SC; **Philadelphia Union**; Portland Timbers; **San Jose Earthquakes**; **St. Louis City SC**

- **Bold** denotes teams that were automatically seeded as hosts in the Round of 32.

=== Bracket ===
Bold denotes the winners of each match.

Round of 32; May 6–7
USLC	Rhode Island FC	1
**MLS**	**(Massachusetts) New England Revolution**	**2**
**MLS**	**(Illinois) Chicago Fire FC**	**4**
USLC	(Michigan) Detroit City FC	0
**MLS**	**(Pennsylvania) Philadelphia Union**	**1 (5)**
USLC	(Indiana) Indy Eleven	1 (4)
**USLC**	**(Pennsylvania) Pittsburgh Riverhounds SC**	**1**
MLS	(New York (state)) New York City FC	0
**MLS**	**(Washington, D.C.) D.C. United**	**2**
USLC	(South Carolina) Charleston Battery	0
USLC	North Carolina FC	1
**MLS**	**(North Carolina) Charlotte FC**	**4**
USLC	(Florida) Tampa Bay Rowdies	0
**MLS**	**(Florida) Orlando City SC**	**5**
**MLS**	**(Tennessee) Nashville SC**	**1**
USL1	(Tennessee) Chattanooga Red Wolves SC	0
USLC	(Kentucky) Louisville City FC	0
**MLS**	**Minnesota United FC**	**1**
**MLS**	**(Missouri) St. Louis City SC**	**2**
USL1	(Nebraska) Union Omaha	0
**MLS**	**(Texas) Austin FC**	**3**
USLC	(Texas) El Paso Locomotive FC	2
USLC	(Arizona) Phoenix Rising FC	1
**MLS**	**(Texas) Houston Dynamo FC**	**4**
USLC	Colorado Springs Switchbacks FC	1
**MLS**	**(New Jersey) New York Red Bulls**	**4**
**MLS**	**(Texas) FC Dallas**	**3**
USL1	(California) AV Alta FC	1
MLSNP	(Washington (state)) Tacoma Defiance	2
**MLS**	**(Oregon) Portland Timbers**	**3**
**MLS**	**(California) San Jose Earthquakes**	**2**
USLC	(California) Sacramento Republic FC	1

Round of 16; May 20–21
MLS	(Massachusetts) New England Revolution	1
**MLS**	**(Illinois) Chicago Fire FC**	**3**
**MLS**	**(Pennsylvania) Philadelphia Union**	**4**
USLC	(Pennsylvania) Pittsburgh Riverhounds SC	1
**MLS**	**(Washington, D.C.) D.C. United**	**3 (2)**
MLS	(North Carolina) Charlotte FC	3 (1)
MLS	(Florida) Orlando City SC	2
**MLS**	**(Tennessee) Nashville SC**	**3**
**MLS**	**Minnesota United FC**	**3**
MLS	(Missouri) St. Louis City SC	2
**MLS**	**(Texas) Austin FC**	**3**
MLS	(Texas) Houston Dynamo FC	1
**MLS**	**(New Jersey) New York Red Bulls**	**2 (4)**
MLS	(Texas) FC Dallas	2 (3)
**MLS**	**(California) San Jose Earthquakes**	**1**
MLS	(Oregon) Portland Timbers	0

Host team listed first
Bold = winner

=== Round of 32 ===
Cobi Jones Group

May 7, 2025	Rhode Island FC **(Rhode Island)**	**1–2**	**(Massachusetts) New England Revolution**	Pawtucket, Rhode Island
7:30 p.m. EDT	Rodriguez 50'	Report	Chancalay 38'; Oliveira 88'	Stadium: Centreville Bank Stadium; Attendance: 9,539; Referee: Calin Radosav

May 7, 2025	**Chicago Fire FC (Illinois)**	**4–0**	**(Michigan)** Detroit City FC	Bridgeview, Illinois
7:00 p.m. CDT	Cuypers 4'; Smith 35' (o.g.); Glasgow 50'; Haile-Selassie 71'	Report		Stadium: SeatGeek Stadium; Attendance: 4,374; Referee: Matthew Thompson

Landon Donovan Group

May 7, 2025	**Pittsburgh Riverhounds SC (Pennsylvania)**	**1–0**	**(New York (state))** New York City FC	Pittsburgh, Pennsylvania
7:00 p.m. EDT	Ydrach 90+7'	Report		Stadium: Highmark Stadium; Attendance: 3,661; Referee: Rodrigo Albuquerque

May 7, 2025	**Philadelphia Union (Pennsylvania)**	**1–1** (a.e.t.) (**5–4** p)	**(Indiana)** Indy Eleven	Chester, Pennsylvania
7:30 p.m. EDT	Bedoya 6'	Report	Amoh 48'	Stadium: Subaru Park; Attendance: 8,633; Referee: Matthew Corrigan
	**Penalties**
	Vassilev (penalty scored); Baribo (penalty scored); Westfield (penalty scored); Rafanello (penalty scored); Lukić (penalty scored)		(penalty scored) Williams; (penalty scored) Blake; (penalty missed) Quinn; (penalty scored) Lindley; (penalty scored) Stanley

Clint Dempsey Group

May 6, 2025	North Carolina FC **(North Carolina)**	**1–4** (a.e.t.)	**(North Carolina) Charlotte FC**	Cary, North Carolina
7:00 p.m. EDT	Mentzingen 98'	Report	Abada 97'; Agyemang 104'; Petković 119'; Vargas 120+3'	Stadium: WakeMed Soccer Park; Attendance: 4,155; Referee: John Matto

May 6, 2025	**D.C. United (Washington, D.C.)**	**2–0** (a.e.t.)	**(South Carolina)** Charleston Battery	Washington, D.C.
7:00 p.m. EDT	Murrell 96'; Stroud 103'	Report		Stadium: Audi Field; Attendance: 6,781; Referee: Ricardo Montero

Jeff Agoos Group

May 7, 2025	Tampa Bay Rowdies **(Florida)**	**0–5**	**(Florida) Orlando City SC**	St. Petersburg, Florida
7:30 p.m. EDT		Report	Caraballo 34', 36'; Enrique 42'; McGuire 59'; Þórhallsson 90'	Stadium: Al Lang Stadium; Attendance: 3,735; Referee: Natalie Simon

May 6, 2025	**Nashville SC (Tennessee)**	**1–0**	**(Tennessee)** Chattanooga Red Wolves SC	Nashville, Tennessee
7:00 p.m. CDT	Bauer 18'	Report		Stadium: Geodis Park; Attendance: 18,544; Referee: Jeremy Scheer (Connecticut)

DaMarcus Beasley Group

May 7, 2025	Louisville City FC **(Kentucky)**	**0–1**	**Minnesota United FC**	Louisville, Kentucky
7:30 p.m. EDT		Report	Randell 65'	Stadium: Lynn Family Stadium; Attendance: 4,482; Referee: Muhammad Kaleia

May 7, 2025	**St. Louis City SC (Missouri)**	**2–0**	**(Nebraska)** Union Omaha	St. Louis, Missouri
7:00 p.m. CDT	Zalinsky 68'; Klauss 87'	Report		Stadium: Energizer Park; Attendance: 6,042; Referee: William Hale

Carlos Bocanegra Group

May 7, 2025	Phoenix Rising FC (Arizona)	**1–4** (a.e.t.)	**(Texas) Houston Dynamo FC**	Phoenix, Arizona
7:00 p.m. MST	Formella 45+4' (pen.)	Report	Andrade 17'; McGlynn 99'; Ponce 112'; Kowalcyzk 115'	Stadium: Phoenix Rising Soccer Stadium; Attendance: 4,346; Referee: Abdou Ndiaye

May 7, 2025	**Austin FC (Texas)**	**3–2**	**(Texas)** El Paso Locomotive FC	Austin, Texas
7:30 p.m. CDT	Vázquez 73', 80'; Uzuni 76'	Report	Avila 20', 34'	Stadium: Q2 Stadium; Attendance: 9,086; Referee: Elton Garcia

Paul Caligiuri Group

May 6, 2025	Colorado Springs Switchbacks FC	**1–4**	**(New Jersey) New York Red Bulls**	Colorado Springs, Colorado
7:30 p.m. MDT	Fontana 71'	Report	Sofo 16', 44'; Gjengaar 63'; Nealis 85'	Stadium: Weidner Field; Attendance: 2,500; Referee: Christopher Calderon

May 7, 2025	**FC Dallas (Texas)**	**3–1**	(California) AV Alta FC	Frisco, Texas
7:00 p.m. CDT	Acosta 3'; Kaick 43'; Kamungo 71'	Report	Lay 16'	Stadium: Toyota Stadium; Attendance: 4,892; Referee: Sergii Demianchuk

Kasey Keller Group

May 6, 2025	Tacoma Defiance **(Washington (state))**	**2–3**	**(Oregon) Portland Timbers**	Tukwila, Washington
7:00 p.m. PDT	De Rosario 48'; Tsukanome 50'	Report	McGraw 33'; Guerra 80'; Kelsy 90+3'	Stadium: Starfire Sports Complex; Attendance: 1,792; Referee: Servando Rico

May 7, 2025	**San Jose Earthquakes (California)**	**2–1**	**(California)** Sacramento Republic FC	San Jose, California
7:30 p.m. PDT	Pellegrino 2'; Judd 44'	Report	Amann 90+6'	Stadium: PayPal Park; Attendance: 9,327; Referee: Ekaterina Koroleva

=== Round of 16 ===
May 20, 2025	New England Revolution **(Massachusetts)**	**1–3**	**(Illinois) Chicago Fire FC**	Providence, Rhode Island
7:30 p.m. EDT	Reynolds 89' (o.g.)	Report	Klein 38' (o.g.); Cuypers 69'; Zinkernagel 79'	Stadium: Chapey Field at Anderson Stadium; Attendance: 2,000; Referee: Greg Dopka

May 20, 2025	**San Jose Earthquakes (California)**	**1–0** (a.e.t.)	**(Oregon)** Portland Timbers	San Jose, California
7:30 p.m. PDT	Skahan 116'	Report		Stadium: PayPal Park; Referee: Ramy Touchan

May 21, 2025	**Philadelphia Union (Pennsylvania)**	**4–1**	**(Pennsylvania)** Pittsburgh Riverhounds SC	Chester, Pennsylvania
7:30 p.m. EDT	Damiani 14' (pen.); Vassilev 45+1'; Jacques 54'; Lukic 86'	Report	Garcia 63'	Stadium: Subaru Park; Attendance: 6,604; Referee: Natalie Simon

May 21, 2025	Orlando City SC **(Florida)**	**2–3**	**(Tennessee) Nashville SC**	Orlando, Florida
7:30 p.m. EDT	Pasalic 17'; Enrique 58'	Report	Schlegel 23' (o.g.); Qasem 40'; Meyer 79'	Stadium: Inter&Co Stadium; Referee: Joshua Encarnacion

May 21, 2025	**New York Red Bulls (New Jersey)**	**2–2** (a.e.t.) (**4–3** p)	**(Texas)** FC Dallas	Harrison, New Jersey
7:30 p.m. EDT	Sofo 62'; Forsberg 90+3'	Report	Kamungo 28'; Acosta 77'	Stadium: Sports Illustrated Stadium; Attendance: 3,749; Referee: Alyssa Nichols
	**Penalties**
	Choupo-Moting (penalty scored); Eile (penalty scored); Carmona (penalty missed); Edelman (penalty scored); Forsberg (penalty scored)		Acosta (penalty missed); Moore (penalty scored); Farrington (penalty scored); Farfan (penalty scored); Pedrinho (penalty missed)

May 21, 2025	**Minnesota United FC**	**3–2**	**(Missouri)** St. Louis City SC	St. Paul, Minnesota
6:30 p.m. CDT	Yeboah 10'; Markanich 85', 88'	Report	Hartel 55'; Klauss 65'	Stadium: Allianz Field; Attendance: 3,325; Referee: Brandon Stevis

May 21, 2025	**D.C. United (Washington, D.C.)**	**3–3** (a.e.t.) (**2–1** p)	**(North Carolina)** Charlotte FC	Washington, D.C.
7:30 p.m. EDT	Schnegg 17'; Tubbs 86'; Hopkins 104'	Report	Agyemang 58'; Tuiloma 61'; Smalls 95'	Stadium: Audi Field; Attendance: 5,179; Referee: Sergii Demianchuk
	**Penalties**
	Herrera (penalty scored); Hopkins (penalty scored); Stroud (penalty missed); Fletcher (penalty missed); Peltola (penalty missed)		(penalty missed) Malanda; (penalty missed) Biel; (penalty scored) Bronico; (penalty missed) Tavares; (penalty missed) Abada

May 21, 2025	**Austin FC (Texas)**	**3–1**	**(Texas)** Houston Dynamo FC	Austin, Texas
8:00 p.m. CDT	Vázquez 29'; Bukari 56' (pen.); Sánchez 60'	Report	Ponce 70'	Stadium: Q2 Stadium; Attendance: 18,532; Referee: Timothy Ford

== Quarterfinals and beyond ==
The draw for the quarterfinals, semifinals and final took place live on CBS Sports Golazo Network on May 22, 2025, performed by CBS Sports Golazo Network presenter Claudia Pagán and U.S. Open Cup commissioner David Applegate. The teams were divided into eastern and western brackets. Home field advantage in the semifinals was determined by a draw to place the four teams in each bracket in priority order, with the highest remaining team in the competition at the semifinal stage playing their match at home.

Quarterfinals; July 8–9; August 13
MLS	Minnesota United FC	3
MLS	(Illinois) Chicago Fire FC	1
West
MLS	(California) San Jose Earthquakes	2 (2)
MLS	(Texas) Austin FC	2 (4)
MLS	(Tennessee) Nashville SC	5
MLS	(Washington, D.C.) D.C. United	2
East
MLS	(Pennsylvania) Philadelphia Union	3
MLS	(New Jersey) New York Red Bulls	2

Semifinals; September 16–17
MLS	Minnesota United FC	1
MLS	(Texas) Austin FC	2
MLS	(Tennessee) Nashville SC	3
MLS	(Pennsylvania) Philadelphia Union	1

Final; October 1
MLS	(Texas) Austin FC	1
MLS	(Tennessee) Nashville SC	2

=== Quarterfinals ===
East Bracket

August 13, 2025	Philadelphia Union (Pennsylvania)	3–2	(New Jersey) New York Red Bulls	Chester, Pennsylvania
7:00 p.m. EDT	Baribo 13'; Iloski 74'; Makhanya 89'	Report	Carmona 8'; Choupo-Moting 71'	Stadium: Subaru Park; Attendance: 18,745; Referee: Joshua Encarnación
Note: Match postponed from July 9 due to severe weather.

July 9, 2025	Nashville SC (Tennessee)	5–2	(Washington, D.C.) D.C. United	Nashville, Tennessee
8:00 p.m. CDT	Pérez 26'; Surridge 53' (pen.), 72'; Najar 81'; Zimmerman 87'	Report	Pirani 5'; Maher 24' (o.g.)	Stadium: Geodis Park; Attendance: 21,328; Referee: Greg Dopka

West Bracket

July 8, 2025	Minnesota United FC	3–1 (a.e.t.)	(Illinois) Chicago Fire FC	Saint Paul, Minnesota
7:00 p.m. CDT	Lod 47'; Yeboah 95', 120' (pen.)	Report	Gutiérrez 28' (pen.)	Stadium: Allianz Field; Attendance: 9,814; Referee: Katja Koroleva

July 8, 2025	San Jose Earthquakes (California)	2–2 (2–4 p)	(Texas) Austin FC	San Jose, California
7:30 p.m. PDT	Arango 12'; Kikanović 99'	Report	Vázquez 65' (pen.); Uzuni 115' (pen.)	Stadium: PayPal Park; Attendance: 10,754; Referee: Brandon Stevis
	Penalties
	Arango (penalty missed); Martínez (penalty scored); Jones (penalty missed); Harkes (penalty scored)		(penalty scored) Rubio; (penalty scored) Uzuni; (penalty scored) Taylor; (penalty scored) Wolff

=== Semifinals ===
September 16, 2025	Nashville SC (Tennessee)	3–1	(Pennsylvania) Philadelphia Union	Nashville, Tennessee
7:00 p.m. CDT	Surridge 36', 50', 85'	Report	Q. Sullivan 70'	Stadium: Geodis Park; Attendance: 24,432; Referee: Victor Rivas

September 17, 2025	Minnesota United FC (Minnesota)	1–2 (a.e.t.)	(Texas) Austin FC	Saint Paul, Minnesota
7:30 p.m. CDT	Pereyra 67'	Report	Bukari 45+4'; Fodrey 120'	Stadium: Allianz Field; Attendance: 14,621; Referee: Alexis Da Silva

=== Final ===
The 2025 U.S. Open Cup final was held on October 1, with Nashville SC earning a place in the 2026 CONCACAF Champions Cup.

October 1, 2025
7:00 p.m. CDT

Austin FC (Texas)	1–2	(Tennessee) Nashville SC
Uzuni 45+1'	Report	Mukhtar 17'; Surridge 60' (pen.)

Q2 Stadium, Austin, Texas
Attendance: 20,738
Referee: Tori Penso

== Top goalscorers ==
Team eliminated for this round.
Team was inactive for this round.

Rank	Player	Team	Goals	By round							
Rank	Player	Team	Goals	1R	2R	3R	R32	R16	QF	SF	F
1	(England) Sam Surridge	Nashville SC	6						2	3	1
2	(United States) Brandon Vázquez	Austin FC	4				2	1	1		
3	(United States) Brent Adu-Gyamfi	Columbus Crew 2	3	2	1						
3	(United States) Beto Avila	El Paso Locomotive FC	3	1			2				
3	(Cameroon) Aaron Bibout	Ventura County FC	3	3							
3	(New Zealand) Riley Bidois	Loudoun United FC	3	2	1						
3	(Argentina) Francisco Bonfiglio	Miami FC	3	2	1						
3	(Senegal) Babacar Diene	One Knoxville SC	3	1	1	1					
3	(United States) Xavi Gnaulati	Monterey Bay FC	3	2	1						
3	(United States) MD Myers	Charleston Battery	3			3					
3	(Honduras) Juan Carlos Obregón	Westchester SC	3	1	1	1					
3	(United States) Brayan Padilla	Foro SC	3	2	1						
3	(Honduras) Josuha Rodríguez	Carolina Core FC	3	2	1						
3	(Ghana) Mohammed Sofo	New York Red Bulls	3				2	1			
3	(Japan) Yu Tsukanome	Tacoma Defiance	3	2			1				
3	(Italy) Kelvin Yeboah	Minnesota United FC	3					1	2		

== Broadcasting ==
TNT Sports held the rights to broadcast the Open Cup from 2023 to 2030, as part of a larger media rights agreement with U.S. Soccer. The U.S. Soccer YouTube channel broadcast all games from the first two rounds. On March 26, 2025, CBS Sports announced an agreement to exclusively broadcast all games beginning with the third round. All games streamed on Paramount+, with select games on the CBS Sports Golazo Network and CBS Sports Network.
