= Karsen Henderlong =

American soccer player (born 2000)

Personal information
- Full name: Karsen Henderlong
- Date of birth: September 24, 2000 (age 26)
- Place of birth: Crown Point, Indiana, United States
- Height: 6 ft 3 in (1.91 m)
- Position: Forward

Team information
- Current team: Tampa Bay Rowdies
- Number: 14

Youth career
- 2016–2019: Indiana Fire Academy

College career
Years	Team	Apps	(Gls)
2019–2021	Xavier Musketeers	45	(22)
2022–2023	Indiana Hoosiers	46	(10)

Senior career*
Years	Team	Apps	(Gls)
2024	Indy Eleven	5	(0)
2025	FC Naples	29	(14)
2026–	Tampa Bay Rowdies	23	(2)
- * Club domestic league appearances and goals as of 17:57, 8 November 2026 (UTC)

Karsen Henderlong (born September 24, 2000) is an American soccer player who plays as a forward for the Tampa Bay Rowdies in the USL Championship. Having played college soccer for Xavier University and Indiana University, he began his professional career with Indy Eleven in 2024 and continued with FC Naples before joining Tampa Bay.

== Career ==
=== Youth and college ===
Originally from Crown Point, Indiana, Henderlong spent his youth career with Indiana Fire Academy, Chicago Fire's youth soccer club. He played high school soccer at Crown Point High School. Henderlong spent three years at Xavier University, where he scored 22 goals in 45 total appearances. Henderlong was a first-team All-Big East selection in 2021 and second-team honoree in 2020 with Xavier. He then played for Indiana University for two years, making 46 total appearances and scoring 10 goals. Henderlong scored three goals in the span of two weeks in October 2023 to lead the Hoosiers into the NCAA Tournament. He scored the tying goal in the 73rd minute in a 3–2 second round overtime win against Wake Forest on November 19, 2023.

=== Professional ===
==== Indy Eleven ====
On February 8, 2024, USL Championship side Indy Eleven announced the signing of Henderlong ahead of the 2024 USL Championship season. He made his professional debut with the Indianapolis-based club in a 2–1 loss away to Oakland Roots on March 9, 2024. Henderlong was released by the club following the 2024 season, having made 5 total appearances.

==== FC Naples ====
On January 10, 2025, USL League One expansion team FC Naples announced they had signed Henderlong for the 2025 season. He made his debut in the team's season opener, a 1–1 home draw against Chattanooga Red Wolves on March 8. On March 15, Henderlong scored both goals in a 2–0 victory over Forward Madison. In addition to being the first goals of his professional career, they led to Naples' first-ever competitive victory and won Henderlong a spot on the USL League One Team of the Week. Henderlong scored the opening goal in Naples' first round U.S. Open Cup win on March 18, defeating USL League Two team Sarasota Paradise 2–1. He scored again on March 22, in the team's 1–0 away victory over Spokane Velocity FC. Henderlong also scored the lone goal in a 1–0 victory over Charleston Battery in the USL Cup. Henderlong ended the regular season with 14 league goals, second in the league, and 4 assists. He was named to the 2025 All USL League One first team for his performance during the season.

==== Tampa Bay Rowdies ====
On December 3, 2025, USL Championship club the Tampa Bay Rowdies announced the transfer of Henderlong ahead of the 2026 season.

== Career statistics ==
As of match played October 24, 2026, 2026

Club	Season	League			U.S. Open Cup		Playoffs		League Cup		Total	
Club	Season	Division	Apps	Goals	Apps	Goals	Apps	Goals	Apps	Goals	Apps	Goals
Indy Eleven	2024	USL Championship	5	0	0	0	0	0	-		5	0
FC Naples	2025	USL League One	29	14	3	1	2 (Note: Appearances in USL League One playoffs)	0	4 (Note: Appearances in USL Cup)	1	38	16
Tampa Bay Rowdies	2026	USL Championship	24	2	0	0	0	0	4	3	28	5
Career totals			58	16	3	1	2	0	8	4	69	21

Notes

- Indy Eleven statistics
- FC Naples statistics
