= Max Glasser =

American soccer player

Personal information
- Date of birth: August 16, 2000 (age 26)
- Place of birth: San Jose, California
- Height: 5 ft 10 in (1.78 m)
- Position: Defender

Youth career
- 2012–2018: Marin FC

College career
| Years | Team | Apps | (Gls) |
| 2018–2022 | UC Davis Aggies | 71 | (3) |

Senior career*
| Years | Team | Apps | (Gls) |
| 2023–2024 | Monterey Bay | 20 | (0) |
| 2025 | FC Naples | 26 | (0) |
- * Club domestic league appearances and goals as of July 28, 2023

Max Glasser (born August 16, 2000) is an American former soccer player who played as a defender.

== Club career ==
=== Youth and college ===
Glasser spent his youth career with Marin FC, training with the club starting in his U13 season through his departure to UC Davis. A multi-sport athlete while a student at Marin Catholic High School, competing in track and field for four years as well as soccer for two. In April 2018 Glasser set Marin County Athletic League record for 400 meter dash with 47.31 seconds. In June that same year, he won a state title in track and field, running the 400 meter dash at a personal best of 46.97.

Glasser continued his two-sport career as a UC Davis Aggie, competing in track and field as well as soccer. Glasser played for the UC Davis Aggies men's soccer team from 2018 to 2022. Glasser played 14 games off the bench for the Aggies in 2018, scoring once, the game winner against Santa Clara Broncos. In 2019, he started all 20 games. Glasser got an assist on the game-winning goal against the UC San Diego Tritons and then against UC Santa Barbara Gauchos. Across his UC Davis career, Glasser made 71 appearances, scoring 3 goals and tallying 10 assists. He was an honorable mention in 2019 for the All-Big West Conference selections, and was named to the Big West second team following the 2021 and 2022 seasons.

=== Professional ===
==== Monterey Bay ====
On February 14, 2023, it was announced Glasser had signed his first professional contract with USL Championship side Monterey Bay FC ahead of their 2023 season. He made his professional debut on March 11, 2023, starting in the club's 2023 season opener. He achieved his first career assist in the 5–3 win against Hartford Athletic, assisting Alex Dixon's 39th-minute goal. However, halfway through the 2023 season, Glasser would suffer an injury which led him to make only 11 appearances across the whole season. It was announced after the 2023 season that Monterey Bay picked up Glasser's contract option, seeing him return for the 2024 USL Championship season.

In the 2024 season, Glasser played in the 3–0 defeat to Loudoun United. Following the 2024 season, Monterey announced that Glasser was among a group of players that would be entering free agency.

==== FC Naples ====
On December 29, 2024, Glasser signed with USL League One team FC Naples ahead of their inaugural season. Glasser was named to League One's Team of the Week during Week 12 of the season as well as bench honors in Week 34. Glasser made a combined 35 appearances across all competitions for Naples in their 2025 season, including starting in the club's first ever USL League One playoff quarter-final and semi-final appearances.

== International career ==
Born in the United States to American parents, Glasser is eligible to represent the Nicaragua national football team through his paternal grandmother. In 2023, Glasser announced that he wanted to represent the Nicaragua national football team internationally. Later that year, Glasser was called invited by the Nicaraguan Football Federation for a mini-camp ahead of a series of friendlies in June 2023, in preparation for the 2023 CONCACAF Gold Cup. He was unable to participate in the matches due to injury, and so it was reported that there was a small but unlikely chance he could be on the Gold Cup squad if healthy. However, in June 2023 Nicaragua would become disqualified for the Gold Cup due to fielding an ineligible player in the CONCACAF Nations League, among other matches. Glasser was once again called up to Nicaragua's national team for a mini-camp in January 2024.
