= Jayden Onen =

English footballer

Personal information
- Full name: Jayden Roy Onen
- Date of birth: 17 February 2001 (age 25)
- Place of birth: Edmonton, England
- Height: 1.81 m (5 ft 11 in)
- Position: Attacking midfielder

Youth career
- –2017: Arsenal
- 2017: Crystal Palace
- 2017–2018: Brighton & Hove Albion
- 2018–2020: Brentford

Senior career*
Years	Team	Apps	(Gls)
2019–2020	Brentford	0	(0)
2019	→ Bromley (loan)	0	(0)
2020–2021	Reading	1	(0)
2021–2022	Sheffield Wednesday	0	(0)
2023	Forward Madison	26	(3)
2024	Lexington SC	8	(0)
2025	FC Naples	24	(6)
- * Club domestic league appearances and goals as of 14:26, 18 January 2026 (UTC)

Jayden Roy Onen (born 17 February 2001) is an English professional footballer who plays as an attacking midfielder.

Onen is a product of the Arsenal, Crystal Palace and Brighton & Hove Albion academies and began his professional career with Brentford B in 2018. Following spells with the U23 teams at Reading and Sheffield Wednesday, he moved to the United States in 2023. There he played for USL League One clubs Forward Madison, Lexington SC and FC Naples.

== Club career ==
=== Youth years ===
An attacking midfielder, Onen began his career in the Arsenal academy, before joining Crystal Palace on a scholarship deal in 2017. He remained at Selhurst Park until December 2017, when he joined the Brighton & Hove Albion academy as a scholar. Onen made one EFL Trophy appearance for Albion's U21 team during the 2018–19 season, before his release in December 2018.

=== English Football League ===
On 17 December 2018, Onen transferred to the B team at Championship club Brentford and signed an 18-month contract. He made 30 appearances and scored three goals for the B team prior to his release at the end of the 2019–20 season. A one-month loan at National League club Bromley in late 2019 yielded just one injury time substitute appearance.

On 6 November 2020, after a successful trial period, Onen joined the U23 team at Championship club Reading on a contract running until the end of the 2020–21 season. During the remainder of the season, he was an unused substitute for the first team on 16 occasions and made two appearances prior to the expiration of his contract.

Following a trial spell, Onen signed a contract running until the end of the 2021–22 season with the U23 team at League One club Sheffield Wednesday. He failed to win a call into a first team matchday squad and was released when his contract expired.

=== USL League One ===
On 17 January 2023, Onen signed a one-year contract with USL League One club Forward Madison. He made 27 appearances and scored four goals during a 2023 season which concluded with a playoff quarter-final defeat. Onen's performances were recognised with a nomination for the USL League One Young Player of the Year award. In January 2024, he joined Lexington SC on a free transfer and made 14 appearances during the 2024 season. On 9 December 2024, Onen became FC Naples' first ever signing ahead of the club's inaugural season in 2025. He made 32 appearances and scored seven goals during the 2025 season, which culminated in a playoff semi-final defeat. Onen was released at the end of the 2025 season.

== International career ==
Onen was called up to the Uganda squad for two 2021 Africa Cup of Nations qualifiers in March 2020, which were later postponed. He participated in a training camp in Dubai in October 2020.

== Personal life ==
Onen was born at North Middlesex Hospital. He is of Ugandan descent on his father's side. In March 2020, it was reported that FUFA were trying to arrange dual-citizenship with Uganda for Onen.

== Career statistics ==
As of match played 8 November 2025

Appearances and goals by club, season and competition
Club	Season	League			National cup (Note: Includes FA Cup, U.S. Open Cup)		League cup (Note: Includes EFL Cup, USL Cup)		Other		Total	
Club	Season	Division	Apps	Goals	Apps	Goals	Apps	Goals	Apps	Goals	Apps	Goals
Brighton & Hove Albion U21	2018–19	—							1 (Note: Appearance in EFL Trophy)	0	1	0
Bromley (loan)	2019–20	National League	0	0	0	0	—		1 (Note: Appearance in FA Trophy)	0	1	0
Reading	2020–21	Championship	1	0	1	0	0	0	—		2	0
Forward Madison	2023	USL League One	26	3	1	1	—		0	0	27	4
Lexington SC	2024	USL League One	8	0	1	0	5	0	—		14	0
FC Naples	2025	USL League One	24	6	3	1	3	0	2 (Note: Appearances in USL League One play-offs)	0	32	7
Career total			59	9	6	2	8	0	4	0	77	11
