= Luka Prpa =

American soccer player

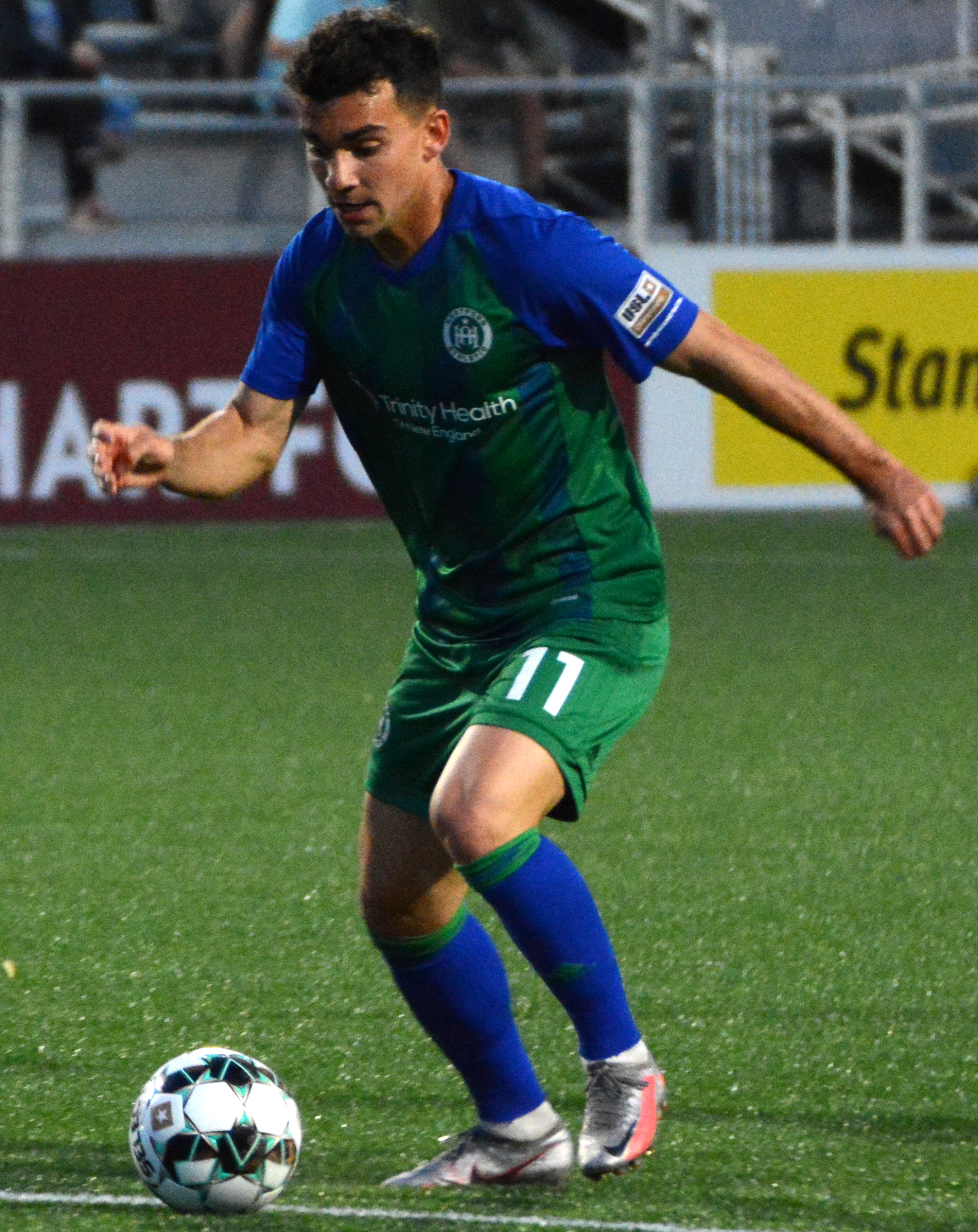
- Prpa with Hartford Athletic in 2021

Personal information
- Date of birth: July 27, 1998 (age 28)
- Place of birth: Milwaukee, Wisconsin, United States
- Height: 5 ft 10 in (1.78 m)
- Position: Midfielder

Youth career
- Chicago Magic PSG

College career
Years	Team	Apps	(Gls)
2016–2019	Marquette Golden Eagles	66	(18)

Senior career*
Years	Team	Apps	(Gls)
2017	OKC Energy U23	7	(1)
2018	Chicago FC United	1	(0)
2020	Rio Grande Valley FC	10	(2)
2021–2022	Hartford Athletic	45	(3)
2023–2024	Chicago Fire II	41	(9)
2025	FC Naples	28	(3)
- * Club domestic league appearances and goals as of October 31, 2025

Luka Prpa (born July 27, 1998) is an American soccer player who plays as a midfielder for USL League One club FC Naples.

== Career ==
=== Youth and college ===
Prpa played four years of college soccer at Marquette University between 2016 and 2019, making 66 appearances, scoring 18 goals and tallying 21 assists.

While at college, Prpa appeared for USL PDL sides OKC Energy U23 and Chicago FC United.

=== Professional ===
On January 9, 2020, Prpa was selected 34th overall in the 2020 MLS SuperDraft by Houston Dynamo.

On February 27, 2020, Prpa signed for Houston's USL Championship affiliate side Rio Grande Valley FC. He made his professional debut on March 8, 2020, starting in a 1–5 loss to LA Galaxy II, scoring RGVFC's lone goal. Following their 2020 season, Rio Grande Valley opted to decline their contract option on Prpa.

Prpa moved to USL Championship side Hartford Athletic on February 15, 2021.

Prpa joined USL League One club FC Naples in February 2025, ahead of the club's inaugural season. He scored in a 1–1 game against the Tampa Bay Rowdies in the U.S. Open Cup which FC Naples ended up losing in penalty kicks. He did however, leave the club when his contract expired on 5 December 2025.

== Personal ==
Prpa is the cousin of fellow professional soccer player Andrija Novakovich.
