= Chris Heckenberg =

Australian soccer player (born 1998)

Personal information
- Full name: Christopher Heckenberg
- Date of birth: 15 August 1998 (age 28)
- Place of birth: Santa Clara, California, United States
- Height: 6 ft 0 in (1.83 m)
- Position: Midfielder

College career
Years	Team	Apps	(Gls)
2017–2021	California Baptist Lancers	85	(1)

Senior career*
Years	Team	Apps	(Gls)
2021	South Georgia Tormenta 2	11	(0)
2022–2023	South Georgia Tormenta	57	(0)
2024	Central Valley Fuego	21	(1)
2025	FC Naples	30	(0)
Total		119	(1)

International career
- Australia U19
- * Club domestic league appearances and goals

Chris Heckenberg (born 15 August 1998) is a former soccer player who played as a midfielder. Born in the United States, he represented Australia at youth level.

== Early and club career ==
=== Youth, College & Amateur ===
Heckenberg was born in Santa Clara, California, but grew up in Melbourne, Australia, attending the Berwick Grammar School, where he won the excellence in soccer award for four consecutive years, and his team to win a championship three times.

In Australia Heckenberg played his Junior soccer for Monbulk Rangers SC, Knox City SC and Box Hill SC, before making his Senior debut at Monbulk Rangers at the age of 15.

In 2017, Heckenberg attended California Baptist University to play college soccer, going on to make 85 appearances for the Lancers, scoring one goal and tallying 14 assists. In his senior year, Heckenberg earned All-WAC Honorable Mention honours and All-Far West Region Second Team honours.

During the 2021 season, Heckenberg also played in the USL League Two with South Georgia Tormenta 2, who helped to make the playoffs.

=== Professional ===
On 18 March 2022, Heckenberg signed with USL League One side South Georgia Tormenta ahead of their 2022 season. He made his professional debut on 2 April 2022, starting in a 1–0 loss to North Carolina FC.

On 22 February 2024, Heckneberg made the move to USL League One side Central Valley Fuego FC following his release from Tormenta.

== International career ==
Heckenberg has represented the Australia men's national soccer team at under-19 level.
