= Pedro Hernández (soccer, born 1999) =

American soccer player (born 1999)

Personal information
- Date of birth: August 14, 1999 (age 27)
- Place of birth: Walnut Creek, California, United States
- Height: 1.70 m (5 ft 7 in)
- Position: Midfielder

Team information
- Current team: Chattanooga Red Wolves
- Number: 14

Youth career
- Diablo FC

College career
Years	Team	Apps	(Gls)
2017–2021	Cal State Monterey Bay Otters	56	(16)

Senior career*
Years	Team	Apps	(Gls)
2022–	Chattanooga Red Wolves	118	(22)
- * Club domestic league appearances and goals as of October 31, 2026

Pedro Hernández (born August 14, 1999) is an American soccer player who plays as a midfielder for Chattanooga Red Wolves SC in the USL League One.

== Career ==
=== College ===
Hernández attended California State University, Monterey Bay in 2017 to play college soccer, going on to make 56 appearances for the Otters, scoring 16 goals and tallying eight assists. He was also a member of the 2019 and 2020 CCAA All–Academic teams.

=== Professional ===
On January 21, 2022, Hernández signed with USL League One club Chattanooga Red Wolves. He made his professional debut on April 2, 2022, appearing as an 83rd–minute substitute in a 1–1 draw with Forward Madison. Hernandez returned to Chattanooga for the 2023 and 2024 seasons.

Hernandez transitioned into an attacking role as a forward and attacking midfielder after spending his professional year largely as an outside back. This change in position resulted in a career season in 2025, scoring 10 league goals, only the fifth Red Wolves player to score double digits over a single USL League One season. He had scored two league goals in each of his previous three professional seasons. He made his 100th appearance for Chattanooga in their 2-1 victory over Westchester SC on October 27, 2025.
