= Brecc Evans =

American soccer player (born 1999)

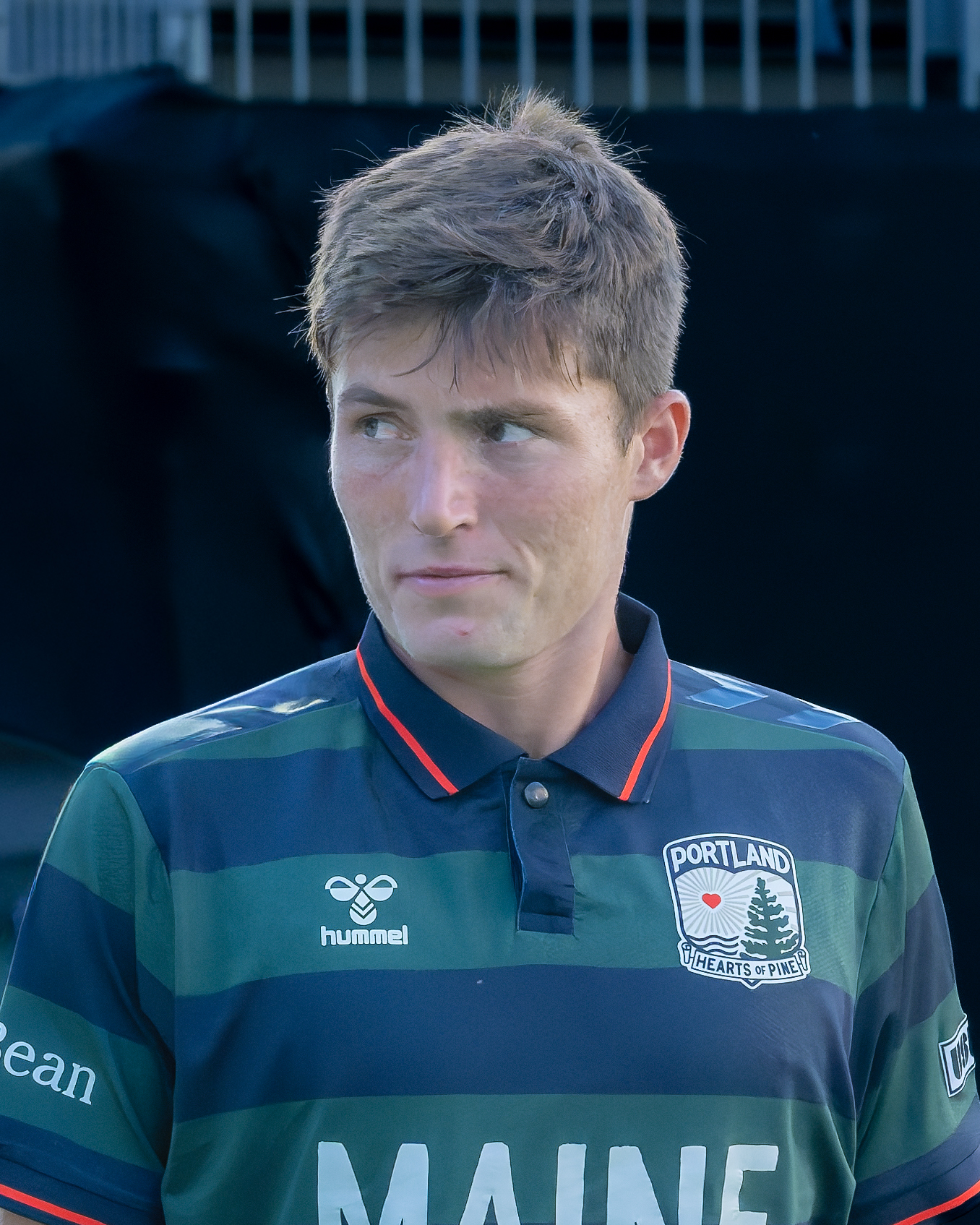
- Evans with Portland in 2026

Personal information
- Date of birth: September 6, 1999 (age 27)
- Place of birth: Santa Monica, California, United States
- Height: 1.93 m (6 ft 4 in)
- Position: Defender

Team information
- Current team: Cascades FC

Youth career
- 2014–2018: FC Dallas

College career
Years	Team	Apps	(Gls)
2018	Cal Poly Mustangs	16	(1)

Senior career*
Years	Team	Apps	(Gls)
2019–2020	North Texas SC	30	(0)
2020	→ Austin Bold (loan)	0	(0)
2021	Memphis 901	22	(0)
2022–2024	Northern Colorado Hailstorm	67	(4)
2025	FC Naples	30	(1)
2026	Portland Hearts of Pine	28	(1)
2027–	Cascades FC		
- * Club domestic league appearances and goals as of November 17

Brecc Evans (born September 6, 1999) is an American soccer player who plays as a defender for USL League One side Cascades FC.

== Career ==
=== Professional ===
In February 2019, Evans signed a two-year deal with North Texas SC ahead of their inaugural season after just one year at Cal Poly, where he played 18 times for their varsity men's soccer team. Preceding the inaugural USL League One season, Evans was named captain of the young North Texas SC squad. He made his league debut for the club on March 30, 2019, playing all ninety minutes of a 3–2 home victory over the Chattanooga Red Wolves. In total, Evans made 22 appearances for North Texas SC, leading the team to a regular season championship and the first seed in the USL League One playoffs.

On November 30, 2020, Evans was released by North Texas.

Evans signed with USL Championship side Memphis 901 on March 24, 2021. He made 22 appearances in his sole season with Memphis 901.

On January 6, 2022, Evans became the fourth-ever player announced by USL League One expansion team Northern Colorado Hailstorm FC. During his time with Hailstorm, Evans helped the club with the inaugural USL Cup and also became the club's all-time leader in minutes played with 6,867.

Evans joined FC Naples on December 30, 2024, ahead of the club's inaugural season in USL League One. He made 30 appearances and scored one goal in his season with Naples.

He signed for fellow League One side Portland Hearts of Pine on December 3, 2025. He made his debut with the club on March 15, a 3−1 victory over the New York Cosmos.

On November 17, 2026, Evans signed for Cascades FC for the team's inaugural season in USL League One.

== Honors ==
=== Team ===
==== Northern Colorado Hailstorm FC ====
- 2024 USL Cup Champions
