= 2026 Indy Eleven season =

Indy Eleven 2026 soccer season

Indy Eleven
2026 season
- Owner: List: Brian Bauer Don Gottwald Shane Hageman Jeffrey Laborsky Fred Merritt Ersal Ozdemir Quinn Ricker Chris Traylor
- Head coach: Sean McAuley
- Stadium: Carroll Stadium
- USL Championship: Eastern Conference: 9th
- USL Playoffs: DNQ
- U.S. Open Cup: Second Round
- USL Cup: Group Stage
- Top goalscorer: League: Rendón (7); All: Rendón (9)
- Highest home attendance: 9,357 (March 21 vs. Detroit City FC)
- Lowest home attendance: 3,073 (March 17 vs. Des Moines Menace)
- Average home league attendance: 8,608
- Biggest win: 3–0 (March 17 vs. Des Moines Menace)
- Biggest defeat: 0–1, 1–2 (March 8 at Brooklyn FC, March 31 vs. Union Omaha, April 25 vs. Union Omaha, May 2 at Tampa Bay, June 12 at Pittsburgh)
Home colors	Away colors	Third colors

The 2026 Indy Eleven season was, for Indy Eleven, a professional soccer club based in Indianapolis, Indiana, the club's thirteenth season of existence, their thirteenth consecutive season in the second tier of American soccer, and their ninth season in the USL Championship. The team also participated in the U.S. Open Cup for the 11th time and participated in the interleague USL Cup for the second time.

== Background ==
The 2025 season saw a regression by Indy Eleven compared to the historic highs of 2024. The second season under head coach Sean McAuley, the club finished in 9th place in the USL Championship Eastern Conference, failing to qualify for the playoffs.

Indy Eleven reached the Round of 32 of the 2025 U.S. Open Cup, losing in penalties against MLS side Philadelphia Union. Indy also reached the Quarterfinals of the USL Cup in their first tournament appearance, winning Group 3 and earning a spot in the knockout round, but were upset after penalties by League One side Greenville Triumph SC.

== Summary ==
=== Regular season ===
The USL Championship released its 2026 schedule on December 16, 2025. Indy's first home game was on March 21, 2026, against Detroit City FC. Indy first met expansion sides Brooklyn FC on March 8 and Sporting Club Jacksonville on May 9. The Eleven will face rivals Louisville City FC twice in the regular season, at home on August 22 and away on October 17.

== Roster ==
As of July 7, 2026

No.	Name	Nationality	Date of birth (age)	Signed in	Previous club	League Apps.	League Goals
Goalkeepers
1	Eric Dick	(United States)	October 3, 1994 (age 32)	2021, 2025	(United States) Pittsburgh Riverhounds SC	16	0
23	Reice Charles-Cook	(Grenada)	April 8, 1994 (age 32)	2025	(England) Welling United F.C.	4	0
44	Ryan Hunsucker	(United States)	July 29, 2007 (age 19)	2021, 2025	(United States) Indy Eleven Academy	0	0
Defenders
2	Hayden White	(England)	April 15, 1995 (age 31)	2024	(England) Ebbsfleet United	29	0
3	Patrick Hogan	(United States)	September 17, 1997 (age 29)	2024	(United States) Pittsburgh Riverhounds	19	2
4	Anthony Herbert	(Trinidad and Tobago)	April 18, 1998 (age 28)	2026	(United States) Las Vegas Lights	7	0
5	Josh O'Brien	(Republic of Ireland)	February 7, 2003 (age 23)	2024	(Scotland) Hamilton Academical	58	4
21	Makel Rasheed	(United States)	May 14, 2001 (age 25)	2025	(United States) South Georgia Tormenta	7	0
24	Mikah Thomas	(United States)	February 21, 2005 (age 21)	2024	(United States) Charlotte FC (loan)	1	0
29	Alejandro Mitrano	(Venezuela)	April 4, 1998 (age 28)	2026	(United States) Miami FC	6	0
37	Paco Craig	(England)	October 19, 1992 (age 34)	2026	(United States) North Carolina FC	11	0
39	Hesron Barry	(Jamaica)	January 8, 2000 (age 26)	2026	(United States) New England Revolution II	9	0
Midfielders
6	Cameron Lindley	(United States)	July 18, 1997 (age 29)	2020, 2023	(United States) Colorado Springs Switchbacks	112	2
7	Allen Gavilanes	(United States)	August 24, 1999 (age 27)	2025	(United States) Miami FC	0	0
8	Jack Blake	(Scotland)	September 22, 1994 (age 32)	2023	(United States) San Diego Loyal	96	25
14	Aodhan Quinn	(United States)	March 22, 1992 (age 34)	2023	(United States) Phoenix Rising	78	12
17	Logan Neidlinger	(United States)	September 6, 2005 (age 21)	2024	(United States) Indy Eleven Academy	29	1
18	Noble Okello	(Uganda)	July 20, 2000 (age 26)	2026	(United States) Phoenix Rising	11	1
22	Mohamed Omar	(Somalia)	April 9, 1999 (age 27)	2026	(United States) San Antonio FC	4	0
Forwards
9	Charlie Sharp	(United States)	June 23, 2001 (age 25)	2025	(Canada) Toronto FC	3	0
10	Kian Williams	(England)	July 1, 2000 (age 26)	2026	(Canada) Valour FC	4	0
19	Edward Kizza	(Uganda)	December 17, 1998 (age 27)	2024	(United States) Pittsburgh Riverhounds	38	4
20	Dylan Sing	(United States)	October 18, 2000 (age 26)	2025	(United States) Charlotte FC	8	2
27	Bruno Rendón	(Cuba)	May 7, 2000 (age 26)	2024	(United States) Northern Colorado Hailstorm	38	10
70	Tyler Lowden	(United States)	October 30, 2010 (age 16)	2026	(United States) Indy Eleven Academy	0	0
90	Loïc Mesanvi	(Togo)	October 6, 2003 (age 23)	2026	(United States) Minnesota United FC	11	1

== Transfers ==
=== In ===
No.	Pos.	Player	Transferred from	Fee/notes	Date	Source
Preseason transfers
9	FW	(United States) Charlie Sharp	Toronto FC	Undisclosed	12/2/25	
20	FW	(United States) Dylan Sing	Charlotte FC	Undisclosed	12/4/25	
1	GK	(United States) Eric Dick	Pittsburgh Riverhounds	Free transfer	12/9/25	
21	DF	(United States) Makel Rasheed	South Georgia Tormenta	Undisclosed	12/11/25	
7	MF	(United States) Allen Gavilanes	Miami FC	Undisclosed	12/18/25	
4	DF	(Trinidad and Tobago) Anthony Herbert	Las Vegas Lights FC	Undisclosed	1/7/26	
29	DF	(Venezuela) Alejandro Mitrano	Miami FC	Undisclosed	1/8/26	
10	FW	(England) Kian Williams	Valour FC	Undisclosed	1/12/26	
18	MF	(Uganda) Noble Okello	Phoenix Rising	Undisclosed	1/15/26	
39	DF	(Jamaica) Hesron Barry	New England Revolution II	Undisclosed	1/20/26	
37	DF	(England) Paco Craig	North Carolina FC	Undisclosed	1/21/26	
90	FW	(Togo) Loïc Mesanvi	Minnesota United FC	Undisclosed	3/2/26	
Inter-season transfers
24	DF	(United States) Mikah Thomas	Charlotte FC	Loan	3/22/26	
22	MF	(Somalia) Mohamed Omar	San Antonio FC	Undisclosed	4/9/26	
70	FW	(United States) Tyler Lowden	Academy player	Academy	5/29/26	

=== Out ===
No.	Pos.	Player	Transferred to	Fee/notes	Date	Source
Preseason transfers
0	GK	(United States) Hunter Sulte	Portland Timbers	End of loan	11/26/25	
4	DF	(Scotland) Finn McRobb	–	Contract expiry	11/26/25	
5	MF	(United States) James Murphy	Loudoun United	Contract expiry	11/26/25	
9	FW	(Jamaica) Romario Williams	Birmingham Legion	Contract expiry	11/26/25	
12	DF	(United States) Brian Schaefer	FC Cincinnati 2	End of loan	11/26/25	
16	DF	(United States) Aedan Stanley	Detroit City	Contract expiry	11/26/25	
18	FW	(New Zealand) Elliot Collier	–	Contract expiry	11/26/25	
21	MF	(Sweden) Oliver Brynéus	–	Contract expiry	11/26/25	
22	FW	(Ghana) Elvis Amoh	Loudoun United	Contract expiry	11/26/25	
30	DF	(United States) Ben Ofeimu	Las Vegas Lights	Contract expiry	11/26/25	
31	GK	(United States) Luke Pruter	Columbus Crew 2	End of loan	11/26/25	
32	MF	(Liberia) Brem Soumaoro	Sporting Club Jacksonville	Contract expiry	11/26/25	
41	DF	(New Zealand) James Musa	Fort Wayne	Contract expiry	11/26/25	
55	DF	(United States) Maverick McCoy	Academy player	Academy	11/26/25	
71	DF	(United States) Joey Zalinsky	St. Louis City SC	End of loan	11/26/25	
99	FW	(Jamaica) Maalique Foster	Charleston Battery	Contract expiry	11/26/25	
Inter-season transfers
7	MF	(United States) Allen Gavilanes	Union Omaha	Loan	5/15/26	

== Matches ==
=== USL Championship ===
==== Standings ====
Pos	Team	Pld	W	L	T	GF	GA	GD	Pts	Qualification
1	Tampa Bay Rowdies (S)	30	18	5	7	52	26	+26	61	Playoffs
2	Charleston Battery	30	16	9	5	56	35	+21	53	Playoffs
3	Detroit City FC	30	14	7	9	34	21	+13	51	Playoffs
4	Louisville City FC	30	13	9	8	51	43	+8	47	Playoffs
5	Pittsburgh Riverhounds SC	30	13	11	6	33	30	+3	45	Playoffs
6	Hartford Athletic	30	10	7	13	35	33	+2	43	Playoffs
7	Rhode Island FC	30	12	12	6	42	33	+9	42	Playoffs
8	Miami FC	30	9	12	9	39	49	−10	36	Playoffs
9	Indy Eleven	30	9	14	7	35	41	−6	34	
10	Birmingham Legion FC	30	6	12	12	40	46	−6	30	
11	Loudoun United FC	30	6	11	13	40	46	−6	31	
12	Brooklyn FC	30	5	19	6	34	63	−29	21	
13	Sporting Club Jacksonville	30	3	22	5	32	78	−46	14	

Updated to match(es) played on October 24, 2026. Source: USL Championship Standings
Rules for classification: 1) total wins against conference opponents; 2) goal differential against conference opponents; 3) goals scored against conference opponents; 4) head-to-head points against conference opponents; 5) points per game against conference opponents; 6) points per game against non-conference opponents; 7) fewest disciplinary points; 8) coin toss or drawing of lots
(S) Players' Shield winner

==== Match results ====
The USL Championship released its 2026 schedule on December 16, 2025. Indy's first home game was on March 21, 2026, against Detroit City FC. Indy first met expansion sides Brooklyn FC on March 8 and Sporting Club Jacksonville on May 9. The Eleven will face rivals Louisville City FC twice in the regular season, at home on August 22 and away on October 17.

The regular season consists of 30 matches, with the Eleven playing home and away against each Eastern Conference opponent. They will also play 8 matches against Western conference opponents, 4 at home and 4 away.

March 8 1	Brooklyn FC	1–0	Indy Eleven	New York, NY
3:30 PM EST	Obregón Jr. 26' (pen.); Okiyoshi (yellow card) 63'; McLaughlin (yellow card) 65'; Alves (yellow card) 90+2'; Servania (yellow card) 90+4'	Report	Quinn (yellow card) 70'; Williams (yellow card) 90+4'	Stadium: Maimonides Park; Attendance: 4,500; Referee: Jeremy Scheer

March 21 2	Indy Eleven	2–1	Detroit City	Indianapolis, IN
7:00 PM EST	Sing 43'; Rendón 62'; Mitrano (yellow card) 77'	Report	Smith 56'	Stadium: Carroll Stadium; Attendance: 9,357; Referee: Matthew Corrigan

March 28 3	Hartford Athletic	2–2	Indy Eleven	Hartford, CT
5:00 PM EST	Anaku 33'; Makangila (yellow card) 82'; O'Brien 88' (o.g.); Diz Pe (yellow card) 90+3'	Report	Herbert (yellow card) 31'; Okello 48'; Mesanvi (yellow card) 66'; Rendón 72'	Stadium: Trinity Health Stadium; Attendance: 2,400; Referee: Elton Garcia

April 4 4	Indy Eleven	1–1	Pittsburgh Riverhounds	Indianapolis, IN
7:00 PM EST	Blake 20' (pen.); Rendón (yellow card) 39'; Okello (yellow card) 74'	Report	Souza (yellow card) 36'; Goldthorp 90+1'	Stadium: Carroll Stadium; Attendance: 8,304; Referee: Matthew Thompson

April 11 5	Indy Eleven	3–1	Monterey Bay FC	Indianapolis, IN
7:00 PM EST	Rendón 14'; Okello (yellow card) 32'; Blake 55'; Mesanvi 68'; Barry (yellow card) 83'; Williams (yellow card) 87'		Garcia Jr. (yellow card) 25'; Leggett 51'; Farnsworth (yellow card) 75'; Blancas (yellow card) 82'	Stadium: Carroll Stadium; Attendance: 9,101; Referee: Joshua Encarnacion

April 18 6	Birmingham Legion	2–2	Indy Eleven	Birmingham, AL
5:00 PM EST	Pasher 39' (pen.); Antwi (yellow card) 51'; McIllhatton (yellow card) 54', (goal) 89'; McCartney (yellow card) 71'	Report	Kizza 68'; O'Brien 81'	Stadium: Protective Stadium; Attendance: 3,657; Referee: Calin Radosav

May 2 7	Tampa Bay Rowdies	1–0	Indy Eleven	St. Petersburg, FL
7:30 PM EST	Acoff (yellow card) 21'; Mattheus 53'	Report	Craig (yellow card) 32'	Stadium: Al Lang Stadium; Attendance: 4,821; Referee: Brandon Stevis

May 9 8	Indy Eleven	2–1	Sporting Club Jacksonville	Indianapolis, IN
7:00 PM EST	Rendón 51'; Herbert (yellow card) 45+1', (goal) 65'	Report	Pedder (yellow card) 10'; Al-Qaq 45', (yellow card) 45+5'; Neville (yellow card) 87'	Stadium: Carroll Stadium; Attendance: 8,419; Referee: Igor Bych

May 23 9	Indy Eleven	3–1	Lexington SC	Indianapolis, IN
7:00 PM EST	Rendón (yellow card) 4', (goal) 13'; O'Brien 71'; Sing 76'; Quinn (yellow card) 90'	Report	Brown (red card) 3'; Zengue (yellow card) 32'; Molloy 51', (yellow card) 56'; Goodrum (yellow card) 80'	Stadium: Carroll Stadium; Attendance: 8,745; Referee: Luis Arroyo

May 30 10	Indy Eleven	1–0	Rhode Island FC	Indianapolis, IN
7:00 PM EST	Okello (yellow card) 15'; Rendón (yellow card) 36', (goal) 55'	Report	Shapiro-Thompson (yellow card) 8'; Holstad (yellow card) 56'	Stadium: Carroll Stadium; Attendance: 8,188; Referee: Thomas Snyder

June 13 11	Pittsburgh Riverhounds	1–0	Indy Eleven	Pittsburgh, PA
7:00 PM EST	Barnes (yellow card) 10'; Mikoy (yellow card) 62'; Kelp 90+2'; Dikwa (yellow card) 90+6'	Report	Lindley (yellow card) 21'; Craig (yellow card) 56'; Neidlinger (yellow card) 90+5'	Stadium: Highmark Stadium; Attendance: 5,977; Referee: Nabil Bensalah

Postponed 12	Indy Eleven	PP	Brooklyn FC	Indianapolis, IN
TBD EST				Stadium: Carroll Stadium

July 4 13	Indy Eleven	2–0	Charleston Battery	Indianapolis, IN
4:00 PM EST	Quinn (yellow card) 36'; Blake (yellow card) 36'; O'Brien 82'; Rendón 90+4'	Report	Kelly (yellow card) 18'; Smith (red card) 68'; Kissiedou (yellow card) 90+2'	Stadium: Carroll Stadium; Attendance: 8,143; Referee: Matthew Thompson

July 15 14	Miami FC	2–0	Indy Eleven	Miami, FL
7:00 PM EST	da Costa 44'; Locadia 76'	Report		Stadium: Pitbull Stadium; Attendance: 611; Referee: Calin Radosav

July 18 15	Detroit City	2–0	Indy Eleven	Hamtramck, MI
7:00 PM EST	Mentzingen 47'; Rodriguez 52'	Report		Stadium: Keyworth Stadium; Attendance: 6,509; Referee: Joshua Encarnación

July 25 16	Indy Eleven	0–1	Loudoun United	Indianapolis, IN
7:00 PM EST		Report	Aboukoura 60'	Stadium: Carroll Stadium; Attendance: 9,234; Referee: Servando Berna Rico

July 31 17	San Antonio FC	3–1	Indy Eleven	San Antonio, TX
9:00 PM EST	Cuello 25'; Parano 48', 70'	Report	O'Brien 90+4'	Stadium: Toyota Field; Attendance: 6,145; Referee: Gerald Flores

August 9 18	Indy Eleven	1–1	Hartford Athletic	Indianapolis, IN
5:00 PM EST	Kizza 3'	Report	Scarlett 74'	Stadium: Carroll Stadium; Attendance: 8,147; Referee: Edson Carvajal

August 15 19	Sporting Club Jacksonville	0–1	Indy Eleven	Jacksonville, FL
7:00 PM EST		Report	Gomez 90+2' (o.g.)	Stadium: Hodges Stadium; Attendance: 1,366; Referee: Joe Surgan

August 22 20	Indy Eleven	2–1	Louisville City FC	Indianapolis, IN
7:00 PM EST	Rendón 31'; Blake 60'	Report	Adams 58'	Stadium: Carroll Stadium; Attendance: 9,542; Referee: Muhammad Hassan

August 29 21	Phoenix Rising FC	2–1	Indy Eleven	Phoenix, AZ
10:30 PM EST	Badji 5'; Flores 28'	Report	Boye 7' (o.g.)	Stadium: Phoenix Rising Soccer Stadium; Attendance: 6,127; Referee: Benjamin Meyer

September 5 22	Indy Eleven	2–2	Birmingham Legion	Indianapolis, IN
7:00 PM EST	Hafferty 20'; Sing 90+8'	Report	Pasher 40'; Williams 66'	Stadium: Carroll Stadium; Attendance: 8,898; Referee: Atahan Yaya

September 11 23	New Mexico United	2–2	Indy Eleven	Albuquerque, NM
9:30 PM EST	Archimede 16'; Hurst 18'	Report	Henry-Scott 50'; Blake 59'	Stadium: Isotopes Park; Attendance: 8,234; Referee: Igor Bych

September 20 24	Indy Eleven	0–1	Oakland Roots SC	Indianapolis, IN
5:00 PM EST		Report	Wilson 59'	Stadium: Carroll Stadium; Attendance: 7,331; Referee: Rodrigo Albuquerque

September 26 25	Indy Eleven	0–2	Miami FC	Indianapolis, IN
7:00 PM EST		Report	da Costa 17'; Tunbridge 44'	Stadium: Carroll Stadium; Attendance: 7,878; Referee: Carlos Rodriguez

September 30 26	Rhode Island FC	1–0	Indy Eleven	Pawtucket, RI
7:30 PM EST	Korzeniowski 23'	Report		Stadium: Centreville Bank Stadium; Attendance: 6,463; Referee: Corbyn May

October 3 27	Loudoun United	1–1	Indy Eleven	Leesburg, VA
6:00 PM EST	Farr 90+5'	Report	Rendón 44'	Stadium: Segra Field; Attendance: 2,479; Referee: Gerald Flores

October 10 28	Indy Eleven	1–3	Tampa Bay Rowdies	Indianapolis, Indiana
7:00 PM EST	Kizza 5'	Report	Myers 73'; Cruz 85'; Micaletto 90+2'	Stadium: Carroll Stadium; Attendance: 9,627; Referee: Trevor Wiseman

October 17 29	Louisville City FC	4–1	Indy Eleven	Louisville, KY
7:00 PM EST	Serrano Lopez 7', 43', 51'; Lambert 33'	Report		Stadium: Lynn Family Stadium; Attendance: 10,328; Referee: Joe Surgan

October 24 30	Charleston Battery	1–0	Indy Eleven	Mount Pleasant, SC
6:00 PM EST	Swan 78'	Report		Stadium: Patriots Point Soccer Complex; Attendance: 5,621; Referee: Joshua Encarnación

=== U.S. Open Cup ===
As a member of the USL Championship, Indy Eleven is participating in the U.S. Open Cup tournament for the 11th time, following their quarter-final appearance in 2025. 16 other USL Championship teams are also participating, as well as 12 USL League One teams, 16 MLS teams, 2 MLS Next Pro teams, and 32 amateur teams from USL League Two, National Premier Soccer League, and open division qualifying. The format for the 2026 U.S. Open Cup was released on December 4, 2025, with Indy Eleven entering as hosts in the first round. They exited in the second round of the tournament with a 1–2 home loss to USL League One side Union Omaha on March 31, their earliest exit from the Open Cup since 2022.

March 17 First Round	Indy Eleven (Indiana)	3–0	(Iowa) Des Moines Menace	Westfield, IN
8:00 PM EST	Mesanvi 31'; Herbert (yellow card) 42'; Okello 60'; Williams (yellow card) 70'; Sharp 75'; Barry (yellow card) 78'	Report		Stadium: Grand Park Sports Campus; Attendance: 3,073; Referee: Alex Beehler

March 31 Second Round	Indy Eleven (Indiana)	1–2	(Nebraska) Union Omaha	Indianapolis, IN
7:00 PM EST	Charles-Cook (red card) 59'; Blake 90+3'	Report	Kallman (yellow card) 50'; Owusu 75'; Tekiela 83'	Stadium: Carroll Stadium; Referee: John Griggs

=== USL Cup ===
The 2026 edition of the USL Cup is a professional soccer tournament held between teams in USL Championship and USL League One. Teams are split into seven groups of six or seven teams; each team will play two teams in their group at home, and two others away. The teams winning their group, along with the two teams that scored the most goals among those that did not win their group, will move to a single-elimination knockout round.

The group stage of the USL cup is played from April 26 to the weekend of July 11. Teams are divided into six regional groups and play two regional opponents at home and the other two away. Indy Eleven was placed into Group 4, competing against fellow USL Championship sides Detroit City FC, Lexington SC, and Louisville City FC as well as USL League One clubs Fort Wayne FC, Forward Madison, and Union Omaha. The winner of the group stage in each group will advance to the knockout stage with two runners-up qualifying via a wild card.

Pos	Lg	Team	Pld	W	PKW	PKL	L	GF	GA	GD	Pts	Qualification
1	USLC	Louisville City FC	4	3	1	0	0	12	4	+8	11	Advance to knockout stage
2	USLC	Detroit City FC	4	2	0	2	0	4	2	+2	8	
3	USLC	Indy Eleven	4	1	2	0	1	5	4	+1	7	
4	USL1	Union Omaha	4	2	0	0	2	10	12	−2	6	
5	USLC	Lexington SC	4	1	1	1	1	7	7	0	6	
6	USL1	Forward Madison FC	4	1	0	0	3	6	10	−4	3	
7	USL1	Fort Wayne FC	4	0	0	1	3	6	11	−5	1	

Rules for classification: 1) points; 2) goals for in cup match play (only for determining wild card); 3) head-to-head points earned in small group play; 4) total wins in small group play; 5) total wins in all cup matches; 6) goals for in small group play; 7) goals for in cup match play; 8) goals assisted in cup match play; 9) goal differential in cup match play; 10) disciplinary points; 11) coin toss.

==== Match results ====
April 25 Matchday 1	Indy Eleven (Indiana)	1–2	(Nebraska) Union Omaha	Indianapolis, IN
7:00 PM EST	Lindley (yellow card) 39'; Quinn (yellow card) 45+2'; Rendón 80'	Report	Cabral (yellow card) 39'; Botello Faz 44'; Borczak 56'; Boudadi (yellow card) 64'	Stadium: Carroll Stadium; Attendance: 8,552; Referee: Elvis Osmanovic

May 16 Matchday 2	Fort Wayne FC (Indiana)	2–2 (1–3 p)	(Indiana) Indy Eleven	Fort Wayne, IN
7:30 PM EST	Healy 33'; Abbey (yellow card) 44'; Garay (yellow card) 45+1'; Thomas (yellow card) 79', (goal) 90+1'; Dias (yellow card) 83'	Report	Blake (yellow card) 15'; Quinn 26'; Neidlinger (yellow card) 39'; Rendón 64'; Craig (yellow card) 68'	Stadium: Ruoff Mortgage Stadium; Attendance: 3,794; Referee: Muhammad Hassan
	Penalties
	Ricol (penalty scored); Healy (penalty missed); Nieto (penalty missed); Thomas (penalty missed)		(penalty scored) Blake; (penalty scored) Quinn; (penalty scored) O'Brien

Jun 6 Matchday 3	Indy Eleven (Indiana)	2–0	(Wisconsin) Forward Madison FC	Indianapolis, IN
7:00 PM EST	Quinn (yellow card) 21'; Craig 48'; O'Brien 54', (yellow card) 68'	Report	Torres (yellow card) 12'; Shannon (yellow card) 47'; Kanyane (yellow card) 50'; Toure (yellow card) 58'	Stadium: Carroll Stadium; Attendance: 8,586; Referee: Muhammad Kaleia

June 20 Matchday 4	Lexington SC (Kentucky)	0–0 (6–7 p)	(Indiana) Indy Eleven	Lexington, KY
7:00 PM EST	Firmino (yellow card) 70'; Zengue (yellow card) 78'	Report	Neidlinger (yellow card) 18'; Rasheed (yellow card) 88'	Stadium: Lexington SC Stadium; Attendance: 5,127; Referee: Sergii Demianchuk
	Penalties
	Molloy (penalty scored); Midence (penalty scored); Ordoñez (penalty scored); Epps (penalty scored); Firmino (penalty scored); Greene (penalty scored)		(penalty scored) O'Brien; (penalty scored) Omar; (penalty scored) Mitrano; (penalty scored) Sharp; (penalty scored) Craig; (penalty scored) Neidlinger; (penalty scored) Rasheed

== Season statistics ==
=== Appearances and goals ===
As of July 7, 2026.

No.	Pos	Nat	Player	Total		USLC		U.S. Open Cup		USL Cup	
No.	Pos	Nat	Player	Apps	Goals	Apps	Goals	Apps	Goals	Apps	Goals
1	GK	(United States) USA	Eric Dick	14	0	12	0	1	0	1	0
2	DF	(England) ENG	Hayden White	6	0	6	0	0	0	0	0
3	DF	(United States) USA	Patrick Hogan	0	0	0	0	0	0	0	0
4	DF	(Trinidad and Tobago) TTO	Anthony Herbert	10	1	7	1	1	0	2	0
5	DF	(Republic of Ireland) IRL	Josh O'Brien	18	4	12	3	2	0	4	1
6	MF	(United States) USA	Cam Lindley	17	0	12	0	2	0	3	0
7	MF	(United States) USA	Allen Gavilanes	2	0	0	0	2	0	0	0
8	MF	(Scotland) SCO	Jack Blake	14	3	9	2	1	1	4	0
9	FW	(United States) USA	Charlie Sharp	5	1	3	0	1	1	1	0
10	FW	(England) ENG	Kian Williams	9	0	4	0	2	0	3	0
14	MF	(United States) USA	Aodhan Quinn	15	1	11	0	1	0	3	1
17	MF	(United States) USA	Logan Neidlinger	13	0	7	0	2	0	4	0
18	MF	(Uganda) UGA	Noble Okello	15	2	11	1	2	1	2	0
19	FW	(Uganda) UGA	Edward Kizza	14	1	9	1	2	0	3	0
20	FW	(United States) USA	Dylan Sing	12	2	7	2	1	0	4	0
21	DF	(United States) USA	Makel Rasheed	12	0	7	0	1	0	4	0
22	MF	(Somalia) SOM	Mohamed Omar	6	0	4	0	0	0	2	0
23	GK	(Grenada) GRN	Reice Charles-Cook	5	0	0	0	2	0	3	0
24	DF	(United States) USA	Mikah Thomas	4	0	1	0	2	0	1	0
27	DF	(Cuba) CUB	Bruno Rendón	17	9	12	7	1	0	4	2
29	DF	(Venezuela) VEN	Alejandro Mitrano	10	0	6	0	2	0	2	0
37	DF	(England) ENG	Paco Craig	15	1	11	0	0	0	4	1
39	DF	(Jamaica) JAM	Hesron Barry	13	0	8	0	2	0	3	0
44	GK	(United States) USA	Ryan Hunsucker	0	0	0	0	0	0	0	0
70	FW	(United States) USA	Tyler Lowden	1	0	0	0	0	0	1	0
90	FW	(Togo) TOG	Loïc Mesanvi	15	2	11	1	1	1	3	0

- Source: Indy stats

=== Disciplinary record ===
No.	Pos.	Name	USLC		Playoffs		Open Cup		USL Cup		Total	
No.	Pos.	Name	Yellow card	Red card	Yellow card	Red card	Yellow card	Red card	Yellow card	Red card	Yellow card	Red card
1	GK	(United States) Eric Dick	0	0	0	0	0	0	0	0	0	0
2	DF	(England) Hayden White	0	0	0	0	0	0	0	0	0	0
3	DF	(United States) Patrick Hogan	0	0	0	0	0	0	0	0	0	0
4	DF	(Trinidad and Tobago) Anthony Herbert	2	0	0	0	1	0	0	0	3	0
5	DF	(Republic of Ireland) Josh O'Brien	0	0	0	0	0	0	1	0	1	0
6	MF	(United States) Cameron Lindley	1	0	0	0	0	0	1	0	2	0
7	MF	(United States) Allen Gavilanes	0	0	0	0	0	0	0	0	0	0
8	MF	(Scotland) Jack Blake	1	0	0	0	0	0	1	0	2	0
9	FW	(United States) Charlie Sharp	0	0	0	0	0	0	0	0	0	0
10	FW	(England) Kian Williams	2	0	0	0	1	0	0	0	3	0
14	MF	(United States) Aodhan Quinn	3	0	0	0	0	0	2	0	5	0
17	MF	(United States) Logan Neidlinger	1	0	0	0	0	0	2	0	3	0
18	MF	(Uganda) Noble Okello	3	0	0	0	0	0	0	0	3	0
19	FW	(Uganda) Edward Kizza	0	0	0	0	0	0	0	0	0	0
20	FW	(United States) Dylan Sing	0	0	0	0	0	0	0	0	0	0
21	DF	(United States) Makel Rasheed	0	0	0	0	0	0	1	0	1	0
22	MF	(Somalia) Mohamed Omar	0	0	0	0	0	0	0	0	0	0
23	GK	(Grenada) Reice Charles-Cook	0	0	0	0	0	1	0	0	0	1
24	DF	(United States) Mikah Thomas	0	0	0	0	0	0	0	0	0	0
27	FW	(Cuba) Bruno Rendón	3	0	0	0	0	0	0	0	3	0
29	DF	(Venezuela) Alejandro Mitrano	1	0	0	0	0	0	0	0	1	0
37	DF	(England) Paco Craig	2	0	0	0	0	0	1	0	3	0
39	DF	(Jamaica) Hesron Barry	1	0	0	0	1	0	0	0	2	0
44	GK	(United States) Ryan Hunsucker	0	0	0	0	0	0	0	0	0	0
90	FW	(Togo) Loic Mesanvi	1	0	0	0	0	0	0	0	1	0

Source: Indy Stats

=== Clean sheets ===
No.	Name	USLC	Playoffs	Open Cup	USL Cup	Total	Games Played
1	(United States) Eric Dick	2	0	0	0	2	14
23	(Grenada) Reice Charles-Cook	0	0	1	2	3	5
44	(United States) Ryan Hunsucker	0	0	0	0	0	0

Source: Indy stats

=== Goals ===
Rank	Name	USLC	Playoffs	Open Cup	USL Cup	Total	Games Played
1	(Cuba) Bruno Rendón	7	0	0	2	9	17
2	(Republic of Ireland) Josh O'Brien	3	0	0	1	4	18
3	(Scotland) Jack Blake	2	0	1	0	3	14
T–4	(United States) Dylan Sing	2	0	0	0	2	13
T–4	(Togo) Loïc Mesanvi	1	0	1	0	2	15
T–4	(Uganda) Noble Okello	1	0	1	0	2	15
T–7	(United States) Charlie Sharp	0	0	1	0	1	5
T–7	(Trinidad and Tobago) Anthony Herbert	1	0	0	0	1	10
T–7	(Uganda) Edward Kizza	1	0	0	0	1	13
T–7	(United States) Aodhan Quinn	0	0	0	1	1	15
T–7	(England) Paco Craig	0	0	0	1	1	15

Source: Indy stats

== Awards ==
=== Weekly awards ===
USL Championship Team of the Week
Week	Starter(s)		Bench	Coach	Opponent(s)	Link
3	(Cuba) Bruno Rendón	–	(United States) Aodhan Quinn	–	Detroit City	
5	(United States) Eric Dick	–	–	–	Pittsburgh	
6	(Scotland) Jack Blake	(Trinidad and Tobago) Anthony Herbert	–	–	Monterey Bay	
10	(United States) Aodhan Quinn	(United States) Logan Neidlinger	(Cuba) Bruno Rendón	(England) Sean McAuley	Jacksonville	
11/12	–	–	(Scotland) Jack Blake	–	Lexington	
13	(United States) Eric Dick	–	–	–	Rhode Island	
17/18	(United States) Makel Rasheed	–	–	–	Charleston	

USL Cup Team of the Round
Round	Starter(s)	Bench		Opponent	Link
3	–	(England) Paco Craig	(Republic of Ireland) Josh O'Brien	Madison	

USL Championship Goal of the Week
Week	Player	Opponent	Link
7	(Uganda) Edward Kizza	Birmingham	

== Kits ==
Type	Shirt	Shorts	Socks	First appearance / Record (W–D–L)
Home	Blue	Blue	Blue	March 17 vs Des Moine (7–1–0)
Away	Red	Red	Red	March 8 at Brooklyn FC (0–4–4)
Third	Yellow/Blue	Blue	Blue	April 25 vs Omaha (0–0–1)

== See also ==
- Indy Eleven
- List of Indy Eleven seasons
- 2026 in American soccer
- 2026 USL Championship season
