= Market Square Arena =

Former indoor arena in Indianapolis, Indiana, US

- Market Square Arena in 1982, with one of two parking garages on the middle left
- Interactive map of Market Square Arena
- Location: 300 East Market Street; Indianapolis, Indiana 46204
- Coordinates: 39°46′6″N 86°9′7″W
- Owner: City of Indianapolis
- Operator: City of Indianapolis
- Capacity: Basketball: 16,530; Ice hockey: 15,993
- Surface: Multi-surface
- Scoreboard: American Sign & Indicator, now Trans-Lux

Construction
- Groundbreaking: October 20, 1971
- Opened: September 15, 1974
- Renovated: 1995
- Closed: October 24, 1999
- Demolished: July 8, 2001
- Cost: $23 million ($150 million in 2025 dollars)
- Architects: Architects 4 (A Joint Venture): Kennedy, Brown & Associates; Fleck, Burkart, Shropshire, Boots, Reid & Associates; McGuire & Shook Corporation
- Structural engineers: J. Robert Carlton & Associates Inc.
- General contractor: Huber, Hunt & Nichols

Tenants
- Indiana Pacers (ABA/NBA) (1974–1999); Indianapolis Racers (WHA) (1974–1978); Indiana Loves (WTT) (1978); Indianapolis Checkers (CHL/IHL) (1979–1981, 1985–1987); Indianapolis Ice (IHL) (1993–1999); Indiana Twisters (CISL) (1996–1997)

Market Square Arena (MSA) was an indoor arena in Indianapolis. Completed in 1974, at a cost of $23 million, it seated 16,530 for basketball and 15,993 for ice hockey. Seating capacity for concerts and other events was adjusted by the use of large curtains which sealed off the upper rows. The arena closed down in 1999 and was demolished two years later.

== History ==
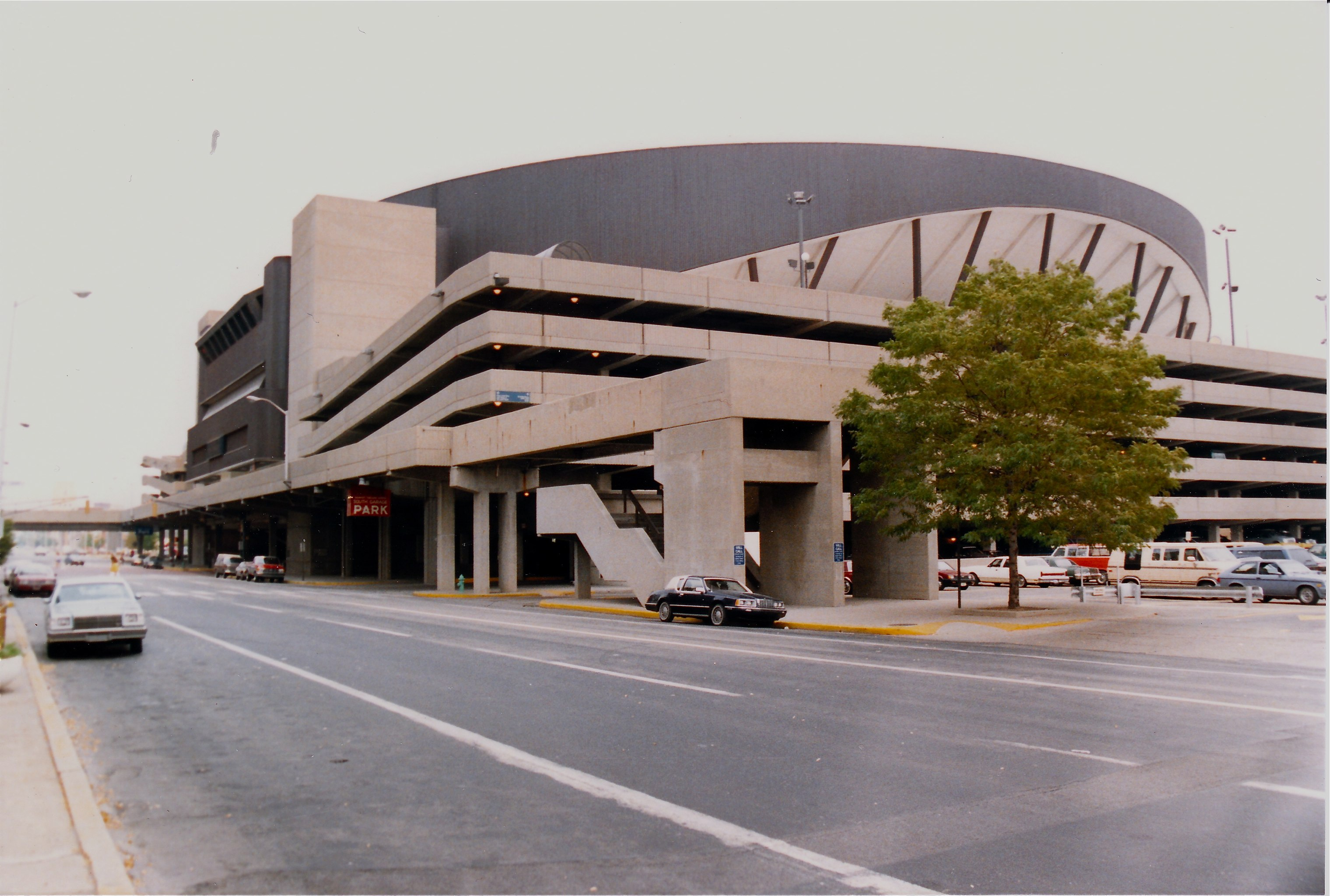
Market Square Arena in 1988.

In the late 1960s, the city of Indianapolis studied several market areas of the city for future development and revitalization. Students from the fourth-year design studio class at Ball State University College of Architecture and Planning met with the City of Indianapolis to review and select 20–26 projects for consideration. Students Joseph Mynhier and Terry Pastorino selected downtown Indianapolis as their market and designed what would become Market Square Arena. The design envisioned by Mynhier and Pastorino was later selected and used as a promotional tool by the City of Indianapolis for construction of the stadium. The city selected four architectural firms to complete the arena design with two representatives from each of the four companies. Terry Pastorino, who had worked for the firm of Kennedy, Brown & Trueblood during the summer of 1970 on the project, later joined the firm working on the arena.

The original student design included a four-story office building covering two city blocks. As constructed, the arena consisted of a unique space frame design spanning Market Street. The playing floor was elevated over Market Street by twin 1400-space parking garages on each side of Market Street. Market Street, which already was physically terminated on the west by the Indiana Statehouse, was visually terminated on the east by the arena. The final design eventually took up one city block spanning Market Street.

The arena was built using a $16 million contribution from the city of Indianapolis.

=== Scoreboard ===
Market Square Arena's original center-hung scoreboard was an American Sign & Indicator scoreboard with monochrome matrix screens, similar to those which would be installed at Arizona Veterans Memorial Coliseum and Joe Louis Arena. Its replacement, another American Sign & Indicator model, but with a color matrix screen on each of its four sides, was installed in time for the 1985 NBA All-Star Game held in the city and remained at the arena for the rest of its life, where it would later be complemented by front-projection video screens on each end of the arena.

=== Demolition ===
The Pacers moved to the new Conseco Fieldhouse, now Gainbridge Fieldhouse, for the 1999–2000 NBA season, and Market Square Arena was demolished on July 8, 2001, in a multimillion-dollar implosion performed by Controlled Demolition, Inc. It only took 12 seconds to demolish the arena completely. The arena's basketball floor remains preserved and housed nearby within the National Institute for Fitness and Sport in White River State Park.

The site of the former arena was a parking lot for over a decade. The parking lot held a memorial to Elvis Presley, who played his final concert at MSA on June 26, 1977. The memorial was designed and built by Alan Clough.

In January 2017, Cummins opened its Global Distribution Headquarters on the southern half of the site. A 28-story apartment building named 360 Market Square and containing a 40,000-square-foot (3,700 m^{2}) Whole Foods Market store opened in March 2018 on the northern half. The Elvis memorial was then placed on the sidewalk adjacent to 360 Market Square.

=== Capacity ===
Basketball
Years	Capacity
1974–1982	17,000
1982–1985	17,096
1985–1991	16,912
1991–1999	16,530

Hockey
Years	Capacity
1974–1999	15,993

== Events ==
Market Square Arena was best known as the home of the Indiana Pacers of the American Basketball Association and National Basketball Association from 1974 to 1999.

The first Pacers basketball game held in the arena was a preseason game against the Milwaukee Bucks; the total attendance was 16,929. The first regular-season ABA game in the arena was held on October 18, 1974, against the San Antonio Spurs; the Pacers lost in double overtime, 129–121 in front of 7,473 fans. The first Pacers victory in Market Square Arena came on October 23 with a 122–107 win over the Spirits of St. Louis. The 1974–75 season ended for the Pacers with the ABA Finals played in Market Square Arena and Freedom Hall against their archrivals, the Kentucky Colonels. The Colonels defeated the Pacers in that championship series, winning the ABA title in five games (4 wins to 1). The 1975–76 Pacers won their final home ABA game in Market Square Arena with a 109–95 victory against the Colonels. (Kentucky won the next game by one point to win the series and advance, ending the Pacers' ABA tenure.) The Pacers continued to play at Market Square Arena after they joined the NBA in 1976; their first game at the arena as an NBA team was a 129–122 overtime loss to the Boston Celtics on October 21. Michael Jordan's return to the Chicago Bulls after his first retirement took place at Market Square Arena in a loss to the Pacers on March 19, 1995.

Market Square Arena was also the home of the Indianapolis Racers of the WHA from 1974 to 1979. The team hosted the first professional sports game in the venue on October 17, 1974, against the Michigan Stags. Seventeen-year-old Wayne Gretzky starred for the Racers in his first professional action before being traded to the Edmonton Oilers after a handful of games.

The arena also hosted the 1980 NCAA men's basketball Final Four, which was won by the University of Louisville. and the Midwestern Collegiate Conference (now Horizon League) men's basketball conference tournament from 1986 to 1988 and again in 1993.

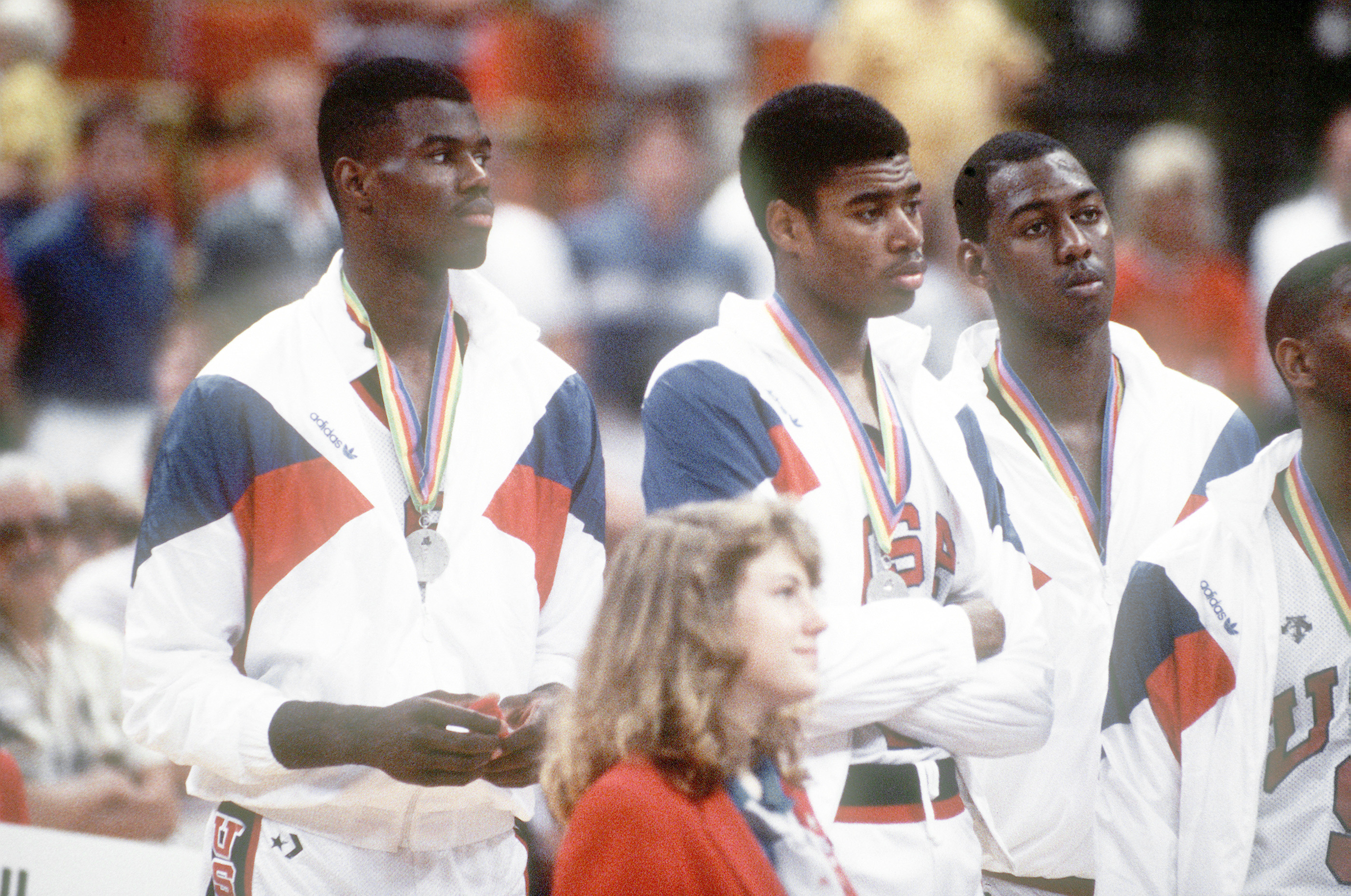
David Robinson, left, stands with some of his teammates at Market Square Arena after they were awarded silver medals for their performance in the 1987 Pan American Games.

In 1987, Indianapolis hosted the Pan American Games, and all of its basketball games were held at Market Square. The gold-medal game pitted Brazil against the United States. The U.S. team of college players featured two All-Americans in David Robinson and Danny Manning, two Final Four MVPs in Pervis Ellison and Keith Smart, and several other future NBA players. The U.S. team led 68–54 at halftime, but Oscar Schmidt led Brazil to a stunning comeback, finishing with 46 points as Brazil won 120–115.

Market Square Arena was the primary concert venue for virtually all national and international musical acts visiting Indiana until its demolition in 2001. While many concerts moved to the Deer Creek Music Center amphitheater during summer months after that venue opened in 1989, Market Square remained the primary concert venue for large acts visiting the city of Indianapolis. Market Square hosted acts from Elvis Presley, Frank Sinatra, Eric Clapton, Kenny Rogers, Deep Purple, Cheap Trick, Grateful Dead, Kiss, Metallica, and several Black Expo performances.

Other events held at Market Square included circuses, Ice Capades, monster truck shows, indoor motocross racing, and rodeos.

As part of a series of 24 NHL games held in non-league markets during the 1992-93 season, the arena hosted its first NHL game on November 3, 1992, a matchup between the Chicago Blackhawks and the Washington Capitals.

=== Notable events ===
The first event held at the arena was a Glen Campbell concert on September 15, 1974.

Led Zeppelin performed at Market Square on April 17, 1977, during its last tour of America.

Elvis Presley performed his final live concert here, in front of 18,000 people, on June 26, 1977, seven weeks before his death on August 16.

The Bee Gees performed here on July 26, 1979, as part of their Spirits Having Flown Tour.

Billy Graham's 1980 Indiana Crusade, featuring a young Bill Gaither as one of the musical guests, was the most attended event at the arena in its history.

Jimmy Swaggart held a crusade in the arena in July 1988. The arena was filled to capacity over the weekend of July 22–24 for each session.

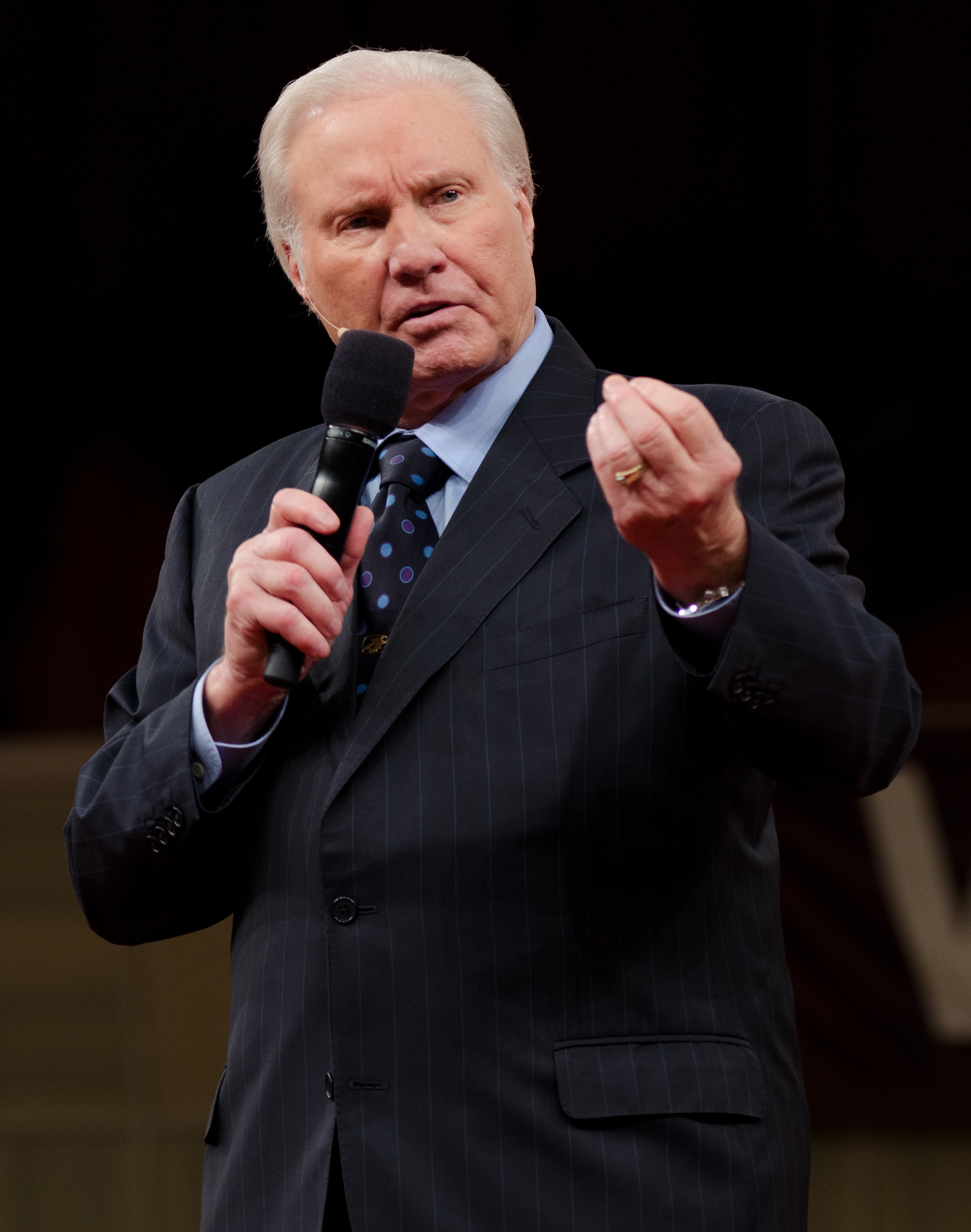
Jimmy Swaggart held a crusade at Market Square Arena in 1988.

Pat Benatar performed during her Precious Time tour on August 19, 1981.

Mötley Crüe filmed their music video for "Wild Side" here on July 18, 1987, which contains footage of drummer Tommy Lee's spinning drum cage.

The video for John Mellencamp's song "Check It Out" was filmed during a concert at the arena on December 11, 1987.

Andre The Giant won the WWF Heavyweight Championship, ending Hulk Hogan's first reign. This was televised live on NBC's The Main Event I on February 5, 1988.

On July 28, 1988 Run-DMC performed their Run's House Tour at the arena with EPMD, Public Enemy, and DJ Jazzy Jeff & the Fresh Prince.

On June 15, 1989, Eazy-E and N.W.A performed as part of their "Eazy Duz It/Straight Outta Compton" Tour, The D.O.C., Kid 'n Play, J. J. Fad, Too Short, and Kwamé.

On November 30, 1990, Ice Cube and Too Short bought their Straight from the Underground tour to Market Square Arena with Yo-Yo, Poor Righteous Teachers, D-Nice, and Kid Rock.

Troy Dixon, better known as Trouble T. Roy, was killed when he accidentally fell from the exit ramp to the ground two stories below following his performance with Heavy D and the Boyz on July 15, 1990.

Hosted an Event In Your House 11: Buried Alive on October 20, 1996

Michael Jackson performed two consecutive sold–out shows at Market Square Arena, during his Bad World Tour on March 18–19, 1988.

KISS' show on November 28, 1992, was recorded and released as a live album, entitled Alive III.

Wayne Gretzky first skated out on the ice to start his pro hockey career here.

Michael Jordan made his first comeback from retirement at Market Square Arena on March 19, 1995; the Pacers defeated the Bulls in overtime in what was the most-watched NBA game on television in 20 years.

== See also ==
- List of American Basketball Association arenas

Preceded by Indiana State Fair Coliseum	Home of the Indiana Pacers; 1974–1999	Succeeded by Conseco Fieldhouse
Preceded by Special Events Center	NCAA Men's Division I Basketball Tournament; Finals Venue; 1980	Succeeded by Spectrum
