= 2025 Pittsburgh Riverhounds SC season =

Pittsburgh Riverhounds SC
2025 season
- Owner: Tuffy Shallenberger
- Head coach: Bob Lilley (Until October 10); Rob Vincent (Interim, since October 10)
- USL Championship: Conference: 4th Overall: 7th
- U.S. Open Cup: Round of 32
- USLC Playoffs: Champions
- USL Cup: Group stage
Home colors	Third colors

The 2025 Pittsburgh Riverhounds SC season was the Pittsburgh Riverhounds SC's twenty-sixth season of existence, their ninth season in the second tier of American soccer, and their fifteenth season in the league now named the USL Championship.

Bob Lilley returned for his eighth season as Riverhounds manager. However, in mid-October, Lilley was placed on administrative leave, being replaced by assistant coach Rob Vincent taking on the role of interim head coach.

The Riverhounds, after twenty-six years of existence, finally won their first league championship in club history, winning the 2025 USL Championship playoffs final against FC Tulsa, with a 5 3 penalty shootout after a scoreless match.

== Roster ==
As of June 6, 2025

No.	Name	Nationality	Position(s)	Date of birth (age)	Signed in	Previous club	Apps	Goals
Goalkeepers
1	Eric Dick	(United States)	GK	October 3, 1994 (age 31)	2024	(United States) Minnesota United		
31	Jacob Randolph	(United States)	GK	April 9, 2001 (age 25)	2024	(United States) UNC Wilmington Seahawks		
67	Ben Martino	(Paraguay)	GK	September 13, 2002 (age 23)	2025	(United States) Huntsville City FC		
Defenders
3	Perrin Barnes	(United States)	DF	March 10, 2001 (age 25)	2025	(United States) Grove United		
5	Sean Suber	(United States)	DF	June 13, 2001 (age 25)	2024	(United States) Huntsville City FC		
6	Max Broughton	(England)	DF	February 25, 2001 (age 25)	2025	(United States) West Virginia Mountaineers		
13	Luke Biasi	(United States)	DF	July 15, 1997 (age 29)	2022	(United States) Syracuse Orange		
16	Roberto Ydrach	(Puerto Rico)	DF	May 25, 2001 (age 25)	2024	(United States) Akron Zips		
17	Brigham Larsen	(Norway)	DF	December 25, 2002 (age 23)	2025	(United States) Charlotte 49ers		
28	Illal Osumanu	(Ghana)	DF	August 20, 1996 (age 29)	2025	(United States) Union Omaha		
Midfielders
2	Danny Griffin	(United States)	MF	July 14, 1998 (age 28)	2023	(United States) Huntsville City FC		
4	Aidan O’Toole	(United States)	MF	June 7, 2001 (age 25)	2024	(United States) Denver Pioneers		
11	Kenardo Forbes	(Jamaica)	MF	May 15, 1988 (age 38)	2018	(United States) Rochester Rhinos		
12	Charles Ahl	(United States)	MF	January 1, 2002 (age 24)	2025	(United States) Stetson Hatters		
14	Robbie Mertz	(United States)	MF	December 4, 1996 (age 29)	2022	(United States) Atlanta United 2		
15	Bradley Sample	(United States)	MF	November 12, 2000 (age 25)	2024	(United States) Louisville Cardinals		
18	Jorge Garcia	(United States)	MF	March 31, 2001 (age 25)	2025	(United States) Villanova Wildcats		
20	Jason Bouregy	(United States)	MF	December 1, 2001 (age 24)	2025	(United States) Villanova Wildcats		
23	Guillaume Vacter	(France)	MF	July 13, 2000 (age 26)	2025	(United States) UConn Huskies		
42	Jackson Wälti	(United States)	MF	December 7, 1999 (age 26)	2024	(United States) Colorado Rapids 2		
70	Pablo Linzoain	(United States)	MF	November 3, 2006 (age 19)	2024	(United States) Riverhounds Academy		
Forwards
9	Augustine Williams	(Sierra Leone)	FW	August 3, 1997 (age 28)	2025	(United States) Indy Eleven		
10	Bertin Jacquesson	(France)	FW	January 20, 2001 (age 25)	2025	(United States) Real Salt Lake		

== Competitive ==
=== USL Championship ===
==== Eastern Conference standings ====
Pos	Team	Pld	W	L	T	GF	GA	GD	Pts	Qualification
2	Charleston Battery	30	19	6	5	62	32	+30	62	Playoffs
3	North Carolina FC	30	13	11	6	40	39	+1	45	Playoffs
4	Pittsburgh Riverhounds SC (C)	30	12	10	8	32	28	+4	44 (Note: Pittsburgh Riverhounds SC are ahead of Hartford Athletic on head-to-head points. PGH 6, HFD 0.)	Playoffs
5	Hartford Athletic	30	13	12	5	48	36	+12	44	Playoffs
6	Loudoun United FC	30	12	12	6	45	48	−3	42	Playoffs

Source: USL Championship Standings
Rules for classification: 1) head-to-head points; 2) head-to-head goal differential; 3) points-per-game within conference; 4) total wins; 5) total goal differential; 6) total goals scored; 7) points earned against top four Conference finishers; 8) disciplinary points; 9) coin toss or drawing of lots
(C) Champions

==== Match results ====
March 8, 2025 1	North Carolina FC	1–1	Pittsburgh Riverhounds SC	Cary, North Carolina
	Conway 22'	Report	Williams 57'	Stadium: WakeMed Soccer Park; Attendance: 2,331; Referee: Matthew Corrigan

March 15, 2025 2	San Antonio FC	2–0	Pittsburgh Riverhounds SC	San Antonio, Texas
	de Jesus Soto (yellow card) 34'; J. Hernandez 54' (yellow card) 84'; Haakenson 88'	Report	Williams (yellow card) 42'; Ydrach (yellow card) 72'; Garcia (yellow card) 87'; Griffin (yellow card) 90+7'	Stadium: Toyota Field; Attendance: 5,876; Referee: Abdou Ndiaye

March 22, 2025 3	Pittsburgh Riverhounds SC	1–0	Hartford Athletic	Pittsburgh, Pennsylvania
7:00 pm ET	Griffin 76'	Report		Stadium: Highmark Stadium; Attendance: 4,026; Referee: Brandon Stevis

March 29, 2025 4	Pittsburgh Riverhounds FC	2–0	Birmingham Legion FC	Pittsburgh, Pennsylvania
	O'Toole (yellow card) 15'; Mertz 36'; Griffin 70'	Report	Damus (yellow card) 72'	Stadium: Highmark Stadium; Attendance: 4,377; Referee: Nabil Bensalah

April 12, 2025 5	Charleston Battery	2–1	Pittsburgh Riverhounds SC	Mount Pleasant, SC
	Molloy 67'; Jennings 80'	Report	Sample 40'	Stadium: Patriots Point Soccer Complex; Attendance: 3,466; Referee: Elijio Arreguin

April 19, 2025 6	Loudoun United FC	2–1	Pittsburgh Riverhounds SC	Leesburg, Virginia
	Leggett 33'; Aboukoura 81'	Report	Garcia 71'; Biasi (yellow card) 56' (yellow-red card) 75'	Stadium: Segra Field; Attendance: 2,040; Referee: Luis Arroyo

May 3, 2025 7	Pittsburgh Riverhounds SC	0–2	North Carolina FC	Pittsburgh, Pennsylvania
		Report	Pérez 66' Dolabella 72'	Stadium: Highmark Stadium; Attendance: 3,808; Referee: Corbyn May

May 10, 2025 8	Louisville City FC	0–0	Pittsburgh Riverhounds SC	Louisville, Kentucky
		Report		Stadium: Lynn Family Stadium; Attendance: 9,903; Referee: Matthew Thompson

May 17, 2025 9	Colorado Springs Switchbacks FC	1–0	Pittsburgh Riverhounds SC	Colorado Springs, Colorado
7:00 PM	Mahoney 12'	Report		Stadium: Weidner Field; Attendance: 8,023; Referee: Elton García

May 24, 2025 10	Rhode Island FC	0–1	Pittsburgh Riverhounds SC	Pawtucket, RI
4:00PM	Sanchez (yellow card) 40'; Herivaux (yellow card) 58'; Shapiro-Thompson (yellow card) 90+2'	Report	Ydrach (yellow card) 6'; Wälti (yellow card) 29'; Griffin 37' (yellow card) 87'; Biasi (yellow card) 83'	Stadium: Centreville Bank Stadium; Attendance: 8,387; Referee: Greg Dopka

June 7, 2025 11	Pittsburgh Riverhounds	2–0	Detroit City FC	Pittsburgh, PA
7:00 PM EDT	Barnes 37'; Mertz 66'	Report		Stadium: Highmark Stadium; Attendance: 5,007; Referee: Muhammad Hassan

June 14, 2025 12	Indy Eleven	1–0	Pittsburgh Riverhounds	Indianapolis, IN
7:00 PM EST	Blake 45+2'	Report		Stadium: Carroll Stadium; Attendance: 9,207; Referee: Alyssa Nichols

June 21, 2025 13	Pittsburgh Riverhounds SC	2–1	Tampa Bay Rowdies	Pittsburgh, Pennsylvania
	Vancaeyezeele 15' (o.g.); Williams 20'	Report	Arteaga 40'	Stadium: Highmark Stadium; Attendance: 5,028; Referee: Natalie Simon

July 4, 2025 14	Pittsburgh Riverhounds SC	1–0	New Mexico United	Pittsburgh, Pennsylvania
	Mertz 73'	Report		Stadium: Highmark Stadium; Attendance: 5,626; Referee: Rodrigo Albuquerque

July 13, 2025 15	Pittsburgh Riverhounds SC	2–2	Loudoun United FC	Pittsburgh, Pennsylvania
	Williams 12' (pen.); Mertz 73'	Report	Bidois 7'; Mines 90+2'	Stadium: Highmark Stadium; Attendance: 4,339; Referee: Elton García

July 18, 2025 16	Detroit City FC	0–0	Pittsburgh Riverhounds SC	Hamtramck, Michigan
		Report		Stadium: Keyworth Stadium; Attendance: 7,235; Referee: Abdou Ndiaye

July 29, 2025 17	Pittsburgh Riverhounds SC	1–1	Miami FC	Pittsburgh, Pennsylvania
	Ahl 90+5'	Report	Bonfiglio 83'	Stadium: Highmark Stadium; Attendance: 5,095; Referee: John Griggs

August 2, 2025 18	Pittsburgh Riverhounds SC	2–0	Rhode Island FC	Pittsburgh, Pennsylvania
	Williams 51'; Jacquesson 57'	Report	Williams (red card) 69'	Stadium: Highmark Stadium; Attendance: 5,044; Referee: Matthew Thompson

August 9, 2025 19	Pittsburgh Riverhounds SC	1–1	Orange County SC	Pittsburgh, Pennsylvania
	Vacter 67'	Report	Zubak 40'	Stadium: Highmark Stadium; Attendance: 5,166; Referee: Mark Verso

August 16, 2025 20	Pittsburgh Riverhounds SC	1–2	Charleston Battery	Pittsburgh, Pennsylvania
	Griffin 11'	Report	Rubín 45+1'; Rodríguez 55'	Stadium: Highmark Stadium; Attendance: 6,115; Referee: Brandon Stevis

August 23, 2025 21	Birmingham Legion FC	1−1	Pittsburgh Riverhounds SC	Birmingham, Alabama
7:00 PM	Damus 28'	Report	Williams 66'	Stadium: Protective Stadium; Referee: Trevor Wiseman

August 30, 2025 22	Tampa Bay Rowdies	2–1	Pittsburgh Riverhounds SC	St. Petersburg, Florida
7:30 PM	Hilton 64'; Pacius 75'	Report	Ahl 2'	Stadium: Al Lang Stadium; Attendance: 4,375; Referee: Servando Berna Rico

September 6, 2025 23	Oakland Roots SC	0–2	Pittsburgh Riverhounds FC	Oakland, California
7:00 PM		Report	Williams 4', 45' (pen.)	Stadium: Oakland Coliseum; Attendance: 5,232; Referee: Elijio Arreguin

September 13, 2025 24	Pittsburgh Riverhounds SC	0–2	Louisville City FC	Pittsburgh, Pennsylvania
7:00 PM		Report	Lambert 50'; Perez 87'	Stadium: Highmark Stadium; Attendance: 5,152; Referee: Elvis Osmanovic

September 20, 2025 25	Hartford Athletic	1–2	Pittsburgh Riverhounds SC	Hartford, Connecticut
7:00 PM	Diz Pe 11'	Report	Ahl 3'; Boone 89'	Stadium: Trinity Health Stadium; Attendance: 5,250; Referee: Greg Dopka
Note: The game was abandoned during stoppage time after allegedly racially offensive language from a Riverhounds player to Marlon Hairston

September 27, 2025 26	Pittsburgh Riverhounds SC	1–0	Las Vegas Lights FC	Pittsburgh, Pennsylvania
7:00 PM	Williams 30' (pen.)	Report		Stadium: Highmark Stadium; Attendance: 5,011; Referee: Amin Hadzic

October 4, 2025 27	Miami FC	3–0	Pittsburgh Riverhounds SC	Miami, Florida
7:00 PM	Zárate 48', 59'; Gavilanes 82'	Report	Ahl 22'	Stadium: Pitbull Stadium; Attendance: 2,033; Referee: Drew Klemp

October 11, 2025 28	Pittsburgh Riverhounds SC	2–1	Indy Eleven	Pittsburgh, Pennsylvania
7:00 PM	Griffin 38'; Suber 76'; Barnes (yellow card) 86'	Report	Schaefer (yellow card) 18'; Lindley (yellow card) 63'; Musa 88'	Stadium: Highmark Stadium; Attendance: 5,618; Referee: Muhammad Kaleia

October 18, 2025 29	Monterey Bay FC	0–3	Pittsburgh Riverhounds SC	Seaside, California
10:00 PM		Report	Suber 27'; Williams 73'; Wälti 86'	Stadium: Cardinale Stadium; Attendance: 2,707; Referee: Gerald Flores

October 25, 2025 30	Pittsburgh Riverhounds SC	0–0	Phoenix Rising FC	Pittsburgh, Pennsylvania
7:00 PM		Report		Stadium: Highmark Stadium; Attendance: 5,067; Referee: Matthew Corrigan

==== USL Championship playoffs ====
By placing 4th in the Eastern Conference, the Riverhounds clinched a home playoff match, being matched up against the 5th seeded Hartford Athletic. Playing at home to a scoreless draw, the Riverhounds managed to score a 4–2 victory in a penalty shootout. Moving on to the Conference Semi-Finals, the Riverhounds are matched up at home against 8th seeded Detroit City FC, who upset 1st seed Players' Shield winners Louisville City FC.

November 1 Conference Quarter-Finals	Pittsburgh Riverhounds SC	0–0 (a.e.t.) (4–2 p)	Hartford Athletic	Pittsburgh, Pennsylvania
6:30 PM ET	Biasi (yellow card) 8'; Mertz (yellow card) 58'	Report	Makangila (yellow card) 43'; Siaha (yellow card) 58'; Hairston (yellow card) 90'; Burke (yellow card) 90'; Moreira (yellow card) 90+8'; Belluz (yellow card) 109'	Stadium: Highmark Stadium; Attendance: 4,932; Referee: Elijio Arreguin
	Penalties
	Jacquesson (penalty scored); Mertz (penalty scored); Williams (penalty scored); Suber (penalty scored)		(penalty missed) Barry; (penalty scored) Farrell; (penalty scored) Panayotou; (penalty missed) Careaga

November 8 East	Pittsburgh Riverhounds SC	0–0 (a.e.t.) (4–3 p)	Detroit City FC	Pittsburgh, Pennsylvania
7:30 PM ET		Report		Stadium: Highmark Stadium; Attendance: 6,220; Referee: Natalie Simon
	Penalties
	Jacquesson (penalty scored); Mertz (penalty missed); Williams (penalty scored); Suber (penalty scored); Ydrach (penalty scored)		(penalty scored) Guenzatti; (penalty scored) Hernandez-Foster; (penalty missed) Amoo-Mensah; (penalty missed) Williams; (penalty scored) Bryant

November 15 East	Pittsburgh Riverhounds SC	1–0	Rhode Island FC	Pittsburgh, Pennsylvania
6:30 PM	Mertz 55'	Report		Stadium: Highmark Stadium; Attendance: 6,745; Referee: Nabil Bensalah

November 22 Final	FC Tulsa	0–0 (a.e.t.) (3–5 p)	Pittsburgh Riverhounds SC	Tulsa, Oklahoma
12:00 PM EST		Report		Stadium: Oneok Field; Attendance: 9,507; Referee: Elijio Arreguin
	Penalties
	Calheira (penalty scored); Lukic (penalty missed); Colli (penalty scored); Batista (penalty scored)		(penalty scored) Jacquesson; (penalty scored) Mertz; (penalty scored) Boone; (penalty scored) Suber; (penalty scored) Ydrach

=== USL Cup ===
==== Standings ====
Pos	Lg	Team	Pld	W	PKW	PKL	L	GF	GA	GD	Pts	Qualification
2	USLC	Hartford Athletic	4	2	1	1	0	9	6	+3	9	Advance to knockout stage (wild card)
3	USLC	Detroit City FC	4	2	1	0	1	8	6	+2	8	
4	USL1	Portland Hearts of Pine	4	1	1	0	2	7	10	−3	5	
5	USLC	Pittsburgh Riverhounds SC	4	1	0	1	2	3	4	−1	4	
6	USL1	Westchester SC	4	0	0	0	4	3	11	−8	0	

Updated to match(es) played on July 26, 2025. Source: USL

==== Group stage ====
April 26, 2025	Detroit City FC	1–0	Pittsburgh Riverhounds SC	Hamtramck, Michigan
4:00 PM EDT	Smith 90+1'	Report		Stadium: Keyworth Stadium; Attendance: 5,716; Referee: Matthew Corrigan

May 31, 2025	Pittsburgh Riverhounds SC	0–1	Rhode Island FC	Pittsburgh, Pennsylvania
7:00 PM EDT		Report	Kwizera 19'	Stadium: Highmark Stadium; Attendance: 5,074; Referee: John Matto

June 28, 2025	Pittsburgh Riverhounds SC	1–0	Westchester SC	Pittsburgh, Pennsylvania
7:00 PM EDT	Jacquesson 15'	Report		Stadium: Highmark Stadium; Attendance: 4,752; Referee: Marie Durr

July 25, 2025	Portland Hearts of Pine	2–2 (5–4 p)	Pittsburgh Riverhounds SC	Portland, Maine
6:30 PM EDT	Washington 64'; O. Wright 72'	Report	Jacquesson 71' 75' (pen.)	Stadium: Fitzpatrick Stadium; Attendance: 5,651; Referee: Edson Carvajal
	Penalties
	O. Wright (penalty scored); Kamara (penalty scored); Wada (penalty scored); Washington (penalty scored); Langlois (penalty scored)		(penalty scored) Broughton; (penalty missed) Garcia; (penalty scored) Ahl; (penalty scored) Griffin; (penalty scored) Suber

=== U.S. Open Cup ===
The Riverhounds, as a member of the second division USL Championship, entered the U.S. Open Cup in the Third Round based on their performance in the 2024 USL Championship season.

April 15	Columbus Crew 2 (MLSNP) (Ohio)	0–1	(Pennsylvania) Pittsburgh Riverhounds SC (USLC)	Columbus, Ohio
6:00 p.m. EDT		Report	Griffin 28'	Stadium: Lower.com Field; Attendance: 376; Referee: Rogelio Alvarez

May 7	Pittsburgh Riverhounds SC (Pennsylvania)	1–0	(New York (state)) New York City FC	Pittsburgh, Pennsylvania
7:00 p.m. EDT	Ydrach 90+7'	Report		Stadium: Highmark Stadium; Attendance: 3,661; Referee: Rodrigo Albuquerque

May 21	Philadelphia Union (Pennsylvania)	4–1	(Pennsylvania) Pittsburgh Riverhounds SC	Chester, Pennsylvania
7:30 p.m. EDT	Damiani 14' (pen.); Vassilev 45+1'; Jacques 54'; Lukic 86'	Report	Garcia 63'	Stadium: Subaru Park; Attendance: 6,604; Referee: Natalie Simon
