= Anthony Cook (footballer) =

English footballer (born 1989)

Personal information
- Full name: Anthony Cook
- Date of birth: 10 August 1989 (age 37)
- Place of birth: Hackney, England
- Height: 5 ft 10 in (1.78 m)
- Positions: Winger; wing-back; midfielder

Team information
- Current team: SE Dons

Youth career
- 2007: Cardiff City

Senior career*
Years	Team	Apps	(Gls)
2007	Croydon Athletic	1	(0)
2007–2009	Dagenham & Redbridge	1	(0)
2008	→ Concord Rangers (loan)	6	(1)
2008	→ Carshalton Athletic (loan)	1	(0)
2009	Braintree Town	1	(0)
2009–2013	Chelmsford City	93	(22)
2011	→ Canvey Island (loan)	0	(0)
2013–2015	Ebbsfleet United	66	(14)
2015	Bromley	32	(10)
2015–2018	Ebbsfleet United	65	(11)
2018	→ Woking (loan)	17	(0)
2018–2019	Dulwich Hamlet	37	(3)
2019–2021	Welling United	43	(10)
2021–2024	Cray Wanderers	132	(29)
2024–	Rayners Lane	1	(1)
2025–	Dulwich Hamlet		
- * Club domestic league appearances and goals as of 13:34, 20 November 2024 (UTC)

Anthony Lloyd Evans Cook (born 10 August 1989) is an English footballer who plays for Combined Counties League Premier Division North club Rayners Lane.

== Club career ==
Cook made his debut for Dagenham & Redbridge and first professional appearance on 15 December 2007, in the 4–0 defeat away to Shrewsbury Town.

Cook featured in the second series of Sky1's reality show Football Icon, where he finished in 4th place after picking up an injury. Shortly after Football Icon he went on trials at Tottenham Hotspur and Cardiff City where he signed for the latter, going on to represent the Bluebirds at reserve and youth team level.

He joined Concord Rangers after leaving Dagenham & Redbridge by mutual consent but joined Braintree Town in March 2009. After impressing during pre-season, Cook was signed for Chelmsford City in July 2009. On 2 February 2013, Cook replaced Stuart Searle in goal against Hayes & Yeading United, playing 84 minutes, following an injury to Chelmsford's first choice goalkeeper. During the game, Cook was on the receiving end of racial abuse from a member of the away support.

In 2013, Cook then opted to sign a one-year deal with Ebbsfleet United after a trial with Colchester United. After signing on for another season, Cook departed the club in January 2015, much to the disappointment of supporters. He signed for league rivals Bromley on 16 January 2015. After winning the Conference South title with Bromley and having a promising start to life in the National League, his old club returned for his services and he eventually departed the club in December 2015, joining Ebbsfleet United for an undisclosed fee. In 2017, Cook was part of the Ebbsfleet side that achieved promotion to the National League, despite picking up in a first half red card against former club Chelmsford City in the play-off final.

On 12 January 2018, Cook joined fellow National League side Woking on loan for the remainder of the campaign. A day later, he made his Woking debut during their 1–0 home defeat against Tranmere Rovers, playing the full 90 minutes. Cook went on to appear sixteen more times for the Cards, before returning to Ebbsfleet in April, prior to their playoff campaign.

On 16 May 2018, Cook announced via Twitter, that he would be leaving Ebbsfleet at the end of the current campaign, following the expiration of his contract.

On 22 June 2018, Dulwich Hamlet announced that Cook had signed a pre-contract agreement, and would be joining the club ahead of their inaugural season in the National League South. On 1 July 2019, he then joined Welling United.

In May 2021, Cook joined Isthmian League Premier Division side Cray Wanderers. In November 2024, he joined Rayners Lane.

Cook returned to Dulwich Hamlet in June 2025.

== Personal life ==
He is the older brother of fellow professional footballers Reice Charles-Cook, Roman Charles-Cook, and Regan Charles-Cook. Cook's uncle, James, is a former British super middleweight boxing champion.

== Career statistics ==
As of match played 9 November 2024

Appearances and goals by club, season and competition
Club	Season	League			FA Cup		EFL Cup		Other		Total	
Club	Season	Division	Apps	Goals	Apps	Goals	Apps	Goals	Apps	Goals	Apps	Goals
Croydon Athletic	2007–08	Isthmian League Division One South	1	0	0	0	—		0	0	1	0
Dagenham & Redbridge	2007–08	League Two	1	0	0	0	0	0	0	0	1	0
Concord Rangers (loan)	2008–09	Isthmian League Division One North	6	1	0	0	—		0	0	6	1
Carshalton Athletic (loan)	2008–09	Isthmian League Premier Division	1	0	0	0	—		0	0	1	0
Braintree Town	2008–09	Conference South	1	0	0	0	—		0	0	1	0
Chelmsford City	2009–10	Conference South	37	7	3	2	—		6 (Note: Four appearances and one goal in FA Trophy, two appearances in Conference South play-offs)	1	46	10
Chelmsford City	2010–11	Conference South	16	5	7	4	—		1 (Note: Appearance(s) in FA Trophy)	0	24	9
Chelmsford City	2011–12	Conference South	4	0	1	0	—		0	0	5	0
Chelmsford City	2012–13	Conference South	36	10	5	1	—		8 (Note: Six appearances and one goal in FA Trophy, two appearances in Conference South play-offs)	1	49	12
Chelmsford City	Total		93	22	16	7	—		15	2	124	31
Ebbsfleet United	2013–14	Conference South	42	10	4	1	—		7 (Note: Four appearances and one goal in FA Trophy, three appearances in Conference South play-offs)	1	53	12
Ebbsfleet United	2014–15	Conference South	24	4	2	0	—		4	2	30	6
Ebbsfleet United	Total		66	14	6	1	—		11	3	83	18
Bromley	2014–15	Conference South	12	6	—		—		—		12	6
Bromley	2015–16	National League	20	4	1	0	—		0	0	21	4
Bromley	Total		32	10	1	0	—		0	0	33	10
Ebbsfleet United	2015–16	National League South	15	1	—		—		3 (Note: One appearance FA Trophy, two appearances in National League South play-offs)	0	18	1
Ebbsfleet United	2016–17	National League South	41	10	3	1	—		7 (Note: Four appearances and one goal FA Trophy, three appearances in National League South play-offs)	1	51	12
Ebbsfleet United	2017–18	National League	9	0	2	0	—		0	0	11	0
Ebbsfleet United	Total		65	11	5	1	—		10	1	80	13
Woking (loan)	2017–18	National League	17	0	—		—		—		17	0
Dulwich Hamlet	2018–19	National League South	37	3	0	0	—		2	0	39	3
Welling United	2019–20	National League South	31	8	4	2	—		2	1	37	11
Welling United	2020–21	National League South	12	2	1	0	—		0	0	13	2
Welling United	Total		43	10	5	2	—		2	1	50	13
Cray Wanderers	2021–22	Isthmian League Premier Division	42	11	1	1	—		3	1	46	13
Cray Wanderers	2022–23	Isthmian League Premier Division	39	7	2	0	—		4 (Note: Appearances in FA Trophy, London Senior Cup and Isthmian League play-offs)	1	45	8
Cray Wanderers	2023–24	Isthmian League Premier Division	38	10	2	0	—		8 (Note: Appearances in FA Trophy, London Senior Cup and Kent Senior Cup)	2	48	12
Cray Wanderers	2024–25	Isthmian League Premier Division	13	1	6	2	—		3 (Note: Two appearances in Kent Senior Cup, one appearance in FA Trophy)	0	22	3
Cray Wanderers	Total		132	29	11	3	—		18	4	161	36
Career total			495	91	44	14	0	0	58	11	597	125
