= Eric Dick =

American soccer player (born 1994)

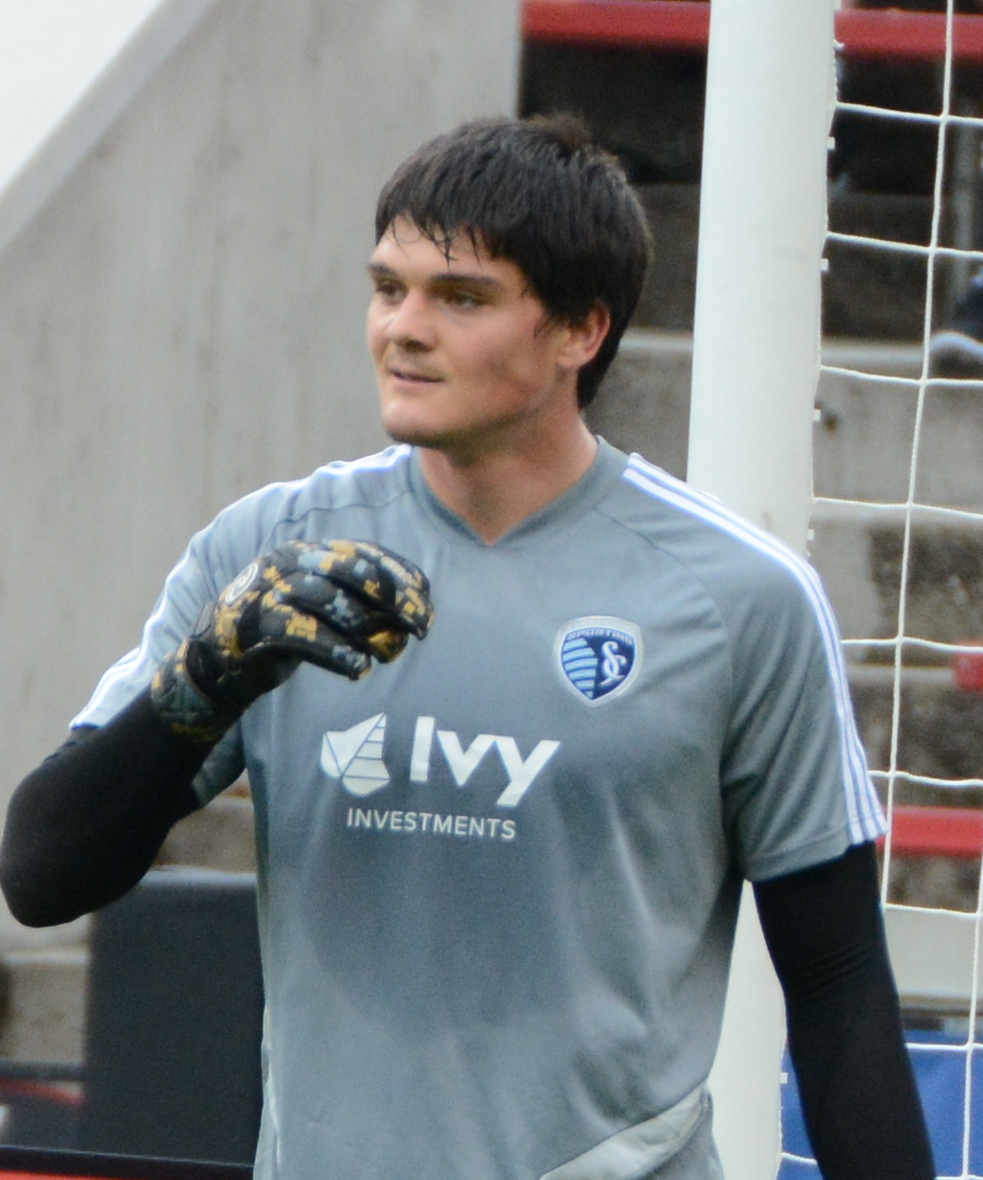
- Dick with Sporting Kansas City in April 2019

Personal information
- Date of birth: October 3, 1994 (age 32)
- Place of birth: Roeland Park, Kansas, United States
- Height: 6 ft 5 in (1.96 m)
- Position: Goalkeeper

Team information
- Current team: Indy Eleven
- Number: 1

College career
Years	Team	Apps	(Gls)
2013–2017	Butler Bulldogs	71	(0)

Senior career*
Years	Team	Apps	(Gls)
2015	Portland Timbers U23s	2	(0)
2017	Oklahoma City Energy U23	13	(0)
2018–2020	Sporting Kansas City	1	(0)
2018–2019	→ Swope Park Rangers (loan)	21	(0)
2019	→ Tulsa Roughnecks (loan)	1	(0)
2020	→ Phoenix Rising (loan)	3	(0)
2021	Columbus Crew	0	(0)
2021	→ Indy Eleven (loan)	4	(0)
2022–2023	Minnesota United	0	(0)
2022–2023	Minnesota United 2	3	(0)
2024–2025	Pittsburgh Riverhounds	54	(0)
2025–	Indy Eleven	47	(0)
- * Club domestic league appearances and goals as of October 31, 2026

Eric Dick (born October 3, 1994) is an American professional soccer player who plays as a goalkeeper for USL Championship club Indy Eleven.

== Career ==
=== College and youth ===
Dick moved from Roeland Park, Kansas, to Carmel, Indiana when he was 5. Dick graduated from Carmel High School in 2013. He played two years of college soccer at Butler University between 2013 and 2017, including a redshirted year in 2013. During his time at Butler, Dick kept 28 shutouts.

Dick also appeared for Premier Development League sides Portland Timbers U23s in 2015 and OKC Energy U23 in 2017.

=== Professional ===
On January 19, 2018, Dick was drafted in the first-round (13th overall) during the 2018 MLS SuperDraft by Sporting Kansas City. Dick signed with Sporting KC on February 15, 2018.

Dick made his professional debut with Kansas City's United Soccer League affiliate Swope Park Rangers on March 31, 2018, when Swope Park Rangers lost 2–1 to Las Vegas Lights.

On June 29, 2019, Dick was sent on a one-game loan to USL Championship side Tulsa Roughnecks.

Dick, who spent most of the season on loan at USL Championship side Phoenix Rising, was released by Kansas City following their 2020 season.

On December 22, 2020, his rights were acquired by Columbus Crew SC in Stage Two of the MLS Re-Entry Draft. On June 24, 2021, Dick joined USL Championship club Indy Eleven on loan. He made his debut for Indy on July 7, 2021, in a 1–1 draw against Atlanta United 2. He kept his first clean sheet for Indy on August 4, in a 2–0 victory over FC Tulsa. Dick ended his loan with four total appearances. Following the 2021 season, Columbus opted to decline their contract option on Dick.

After being selected by Minnesota United FC in Stage 2 of the 2021 MLS Re-Entry Draft, Dick officially signed with the club on January 18, 2022. Dick made his first and only appearance with the Minnesota first team on May 25, 2022, in a 2–1 loss to Union Omaha in the U.S. Open Cup. Dick was sent on loan to Minnesota United FC 2, where he made three total appearances and kept two clean sheets over two years.

Dick signed with USL Championship club Pittsburgh Riverhounds on January 22, 2024. Dick made his debut for Pittsburgh on March 9, 2024, in a 1–0 loss to New Mexico United. He kept his first clean sheet for the club on April 6 in a 0–0 draw against the Tampa Bay Rowdies. He quickly became the team's first-choice goalkeeper and made 27 regular season appearances over the year, winning the USL Championship Golden Glove and Goalkeeper of the Year awards. In 2025, Dick led Pittsburgh to its first-ever league championship title, keeping a clean sheet in all four postseason matches and winning the Most Valuable Player award in the final after defeating FC Tulsa on penalties. Dick ended his time at Pittsburgh with 61 total appearances and 30 total clean sheets, a franchise record.

On December 9, 2025, Dick rejoined USL Championship club Indy Eleven. Dick previously spent the 2021 season on loan with the club.

== Career statistics ==
=== Club ===
As of match played November 22, 2025

Appearances and goals by club, season and competition
Club	Season	League			Playoffs		League Cup		National cup		Total	
Club	Season	Division	Apps	Goals	Apps	Goals	Apps	Goals	Apps	Goals	Apps	Goals
Sporting Kansas City	2018	Major League Soccer	0	0	0	0	—		0	0	0	0
Sporting Kansas City	2019	MLS	1	0	0	0	—		0	0	1	0
Sporting Kansas City	Total		1	0	0	0	0	0	0	0	1	0
Swope Park Rangers (loan)	2018	USL Championship	15	0	—		—		—		15	0
Swope Park Rangers (loan)	2019	USL C	9	0	—		—		—		9	0
Swope Park Rangers (loan)	Total		24	0	0	0	0	0	0	0	24	0
Tulsa Roughnecks (loan)	2019	USL C	1	0	0	0	—		—		1	0
Phoenix Rising (loan)	2020	USL C	3	0	0	0	—		—		3	0
Columbus Crew	2021	MLS	0	0	0	0	—		0	0	0	0
Indy Eleven (loan)	2021	USL C	4	0	—		—		—		4	0
Minnesota United FC	2022	MLS	0	0	0	0	—		1	0	1	0
Minnesota United FC	2023	MLS	0	0	0	0	—		0	0	0	0
Minnesota United FC	Total		0	0	0	0	0	0	1	0	1	0
Minnesota United FC 2 (loan)	2022	MLS Next Pro	3	0	0	0	—		0	0	3	0
Pittsburgh Riverhounds SC	2024	USL C	27	0	1	0	—		0	0	28	0
Pittsburgh Riverhounds SC	2025	USL C	27	0	4	0	0	0	2	0	33	0
Pittsburgh Riverhounds SC	Total		54	0	5	0	0	0	2	0	61	0
Indy Eleven	2026	USL C	0	0	0	0	0	0	0	0	0	0
Career total			90	0	5	0	0	0	3	0	98	0

== Honors ==
=== Club ===
==== Phoenix Rising FC ====
- USL Championship Western Conference Champions: 2020

==== Pittsburgh Riverhounds SC ====
- USL Championship Eastern Conference Champions: 2025
- USL Championship Champions: 2025

=== Individual ===
- USL Championship Goalkeeper of the Year: 2024
- USL Championship Golden Glove: 2024
- USL Championship All-League First Team: 2024
- USL Championship Final Most Valuable Player: 2025
