= Roman Charles-Cook =

Footballer (born 2003)

Personal information
- Full name: Roman Omar Charles-Cook
- Date of birth: 22 December 2003 (age 22)
- Place of birth: Lewisham, England
- Position: Right-back

Team information
- Current team: Dover Athletic
- Number: 2

Youth career
- Sutton United

Senior career*
Years	Team	Apps	(Gls)
2022–2023	Sutton United	0	(0)
2022	→ South Park (loan)	4	(0)
2022	→ Cray Wanderers (loan)	6	(0)
2022–2023	→ Merstham (loan)	9	(0)
2023	→ Harrow Borough (loan)	6	(0)
2023–	Dover Athletic	116	(15)

International career^{‡}
2023–	Grenada	3	(0)
- * Club domestic league appearances and goals as of 08:16, 1 May 2026 (UTC) ‡ National team caps and goals as of 21:17, 19 January 2024 (UTC)

Roman Omar Charles-Cook (born 22 December 2003) is a professional footballer who plays as a right-back for National League South club Dover Athletic. Born in England, Charles-Cook represents the Grenada national team.

== Club career ==
A youth product of Sutton United, Charles-Cook began his senior career on a 4-week loan with South Park in the Isthmian League on 3 March 2022. On 24 June 2022, he signed his first professional contract with Sutton United. In the first half of the 2022–23 season, he started with short loans with Cray Wanderers and Merstham in the Southern Football League, before a final loan in March 2023 with Harrow Borough to finish the season. On 10 May 2023, he was released by Sutton United. On 1 August 2023, he signed with Dover Athletic in the National League.

== International career ==
Born in England, Charles-Cook is of Grenadian and Jamaican descent. In June 2023, he was called up to the Grenada national team for 2023 CONCACAF Nations League Finals matches.

== Personal life ==
Charles-Cook is the brother of fellow professional footballers Anthony Cook, Regan Charles-Cook, and Reice Charles-Cook. His uncle, James, is a former British super middleweight boxing champion.

== Career statistics ==
As of match played 13 January 2024

Appearances and goals by club, season and competition
Club	Season	League			FA Cup		League Cup		Other		Total	
Club	Season	Division	Apps	Goals	Apps	Goals	Apps	Goals	Apps	Goals	Apps	Goals
Sutton United	2021–22	League Two	0	0	0	0	0	0	0	0	0	0
Sutton United	2022–23	League Two	0	0	0	0	0	0	0	0	0	0
Sutton United	Total		0	0	0	0	0	0	0	0	0	0
South Park (loan)	2021–22	Isthmian League South Central Division	4	0	—		—		—		4	0
Cray Wanderers (loan)	2022–23	Isthmian League Premier Division	6	0	0	0	—		1 (Note: Appearance in the FA Trophy)	0	7	0
Merstham (loan)	2022–23	Isthmian League South Central Division	9	0	—		—		0	0	9	0
Harrow Borough (loan)	2022–23	Southern League Premier Division South	6	0	—		—		—		6	0
Dover Athletic	2023–24	National League South	32	3	1	0	—		0	0	14	2
Career total			57	3	1	0	0	0	1	0	40	2
