= Reice Charles-Cook =

Grenadian footballer (born 1994)

Personal information
- Full name: Reice Jordan Charles-Cook
- Date of birth: 8 April 1994 (age 32)
- Place of birth: Lewisham, England
- Height: 1.85 m (6 ft 1 in)
- Position: Goalkeeper

Team information
- Current team: Indy Eleven
- Number: 23

Youth career
- –2012: Arsenal

Senior career*
Years	Team	Apps	(Gls)
2012–2013	Arsenal	0	(0)
2013	→ Chelmsford City (loan)	3	(0)
2013–2014	Bury	2	(0)
2014–2017	Coventry City	52	(0)
2014	→ Nuneaton Town (loan)	17	(0)
2017–2018	Swindon Town	22	(0)
2018–2019	SønderjyskE	0	(0)
2019	Shrewsbury Town	0	(0)
2019–2020	Macclesfield Town	2	(0)
2020	Boreham Wood	0	(0)
2020–2021	Welling United	12	(0)
2021–2022	Bromley	1	(0)
2022	Hampton & Richmond Borough	2	(0)
2022	Dartford	5	(0)
2022–2023	Bromley	32	(0)
2023	Havant & Waterlooville	2	(0)
2023–2024	Welling United	27	(0)
2025–	Indy Eleven	6	(0)

International career^{‡}
2021–	Grenada	7	(0)
- * Club domestic league appearances and goals as of 19:15, 7 November 2026 (UTC) ‡ National team caps and goals as of 10:30, 24 June 2021 (UTC)

Reice Jordan Charles-Cook (born 8 April 1994) is a professional footballer who plays as a goalkeeper for USL Championship club Indy Eleven. Born in England, he represents the Grenada national team.

Charles-Cook began his career at Arsenal, and enjoyed a loan spell at non-league Chelmsford City in February 2013, before signing with Bury five months later. He made his debut in the English Football League in March 2014 and then signed with Coventry City four months later. He spent the first part of the 2014–15 season on loan at Nuneaton Town and then established him in the starting eleven at Coventry during the 2015–16 season, before losing his place when Tony Mowbray left the club in September 2016. He spent the 2017–18 season at Swindon Town and joined Danish Superliga club SønderjyskE in October 2018. He joined Shrewsbury Town in January 2019 and spent the 2019–20 season with Macclesfield Town.

== Club career ==
=== Early career ===
Born and raised in Forest Hill, Lewisham, London, Reice-Cook became a goalkeeper after being diagnosed with a heart murmur as a child, which would have been potentially dangerous to an outfield player. He was a youth player at Arsenal and made his under-21 debut at the age of 14. He signed his first professional contract there in 2012, before joining Chelmsford City of the Conference South for a month long loan on 3 February 2013; his brother, Anthony, played for Chelmsford, who needed a stand in for the injured Stuart Searle. He made his debut for Glenn Pennyfather's "Clarets" the next day, in a 1–1 home draw with Billericay Town. He returned to the Emirates Stadium after having played a total of three games. He later admitted he found the transition from academy player at Premier League giants Arsenal into lower-league football difficult: "I like to have a laugh and that, people say I'm not serious, people like to say: 'You're not at Arsenal anymore.' That's what a lot of managers like to use as an excuse [for not picking me]".

After a trial at Bristol City, he signed a one-year contract with Bury on 14 July 2013; "Shakers" boss Kevin Blackwell commented that "we haven't got a young goalkeeper and Reice fits the bill". His agent, Lee Payne, said that "the goalkeeping coach at Bury is Fred Barber. There are not many keeper coaches in the game with a better track record; the opportunity for Reice to be working full-time with Fred is an incredible one for him, and so we were all delighted to grab at it when it arose". He made his League Two debut on 15 March 2014, in a goalless draw at Southend United; he came on as a half-time substitute for Brian Jensen. He started the next match, a 2–1 defeat at Torquay United. He made no further appearances for the club and left Gigg Lane at the end of the 2013–14 season.

=== Coventry City ===
On 18 July 2014, Charles-Cook signed a one-year deal with League One club Coventry City, with an option for a second year, after impressing goalkeeping coach Steve Ogrizovic on trial with his athleticism. On 1 August, he was loaned out to Nuneaton Town in the Conference Premier until January; he had already been playing for Brian Reid's "Boro" in pre-season friendlies. On 11 October, he was sent off in a 4–1 loss at Welling United, though manager Liam Daish refused to blame him for the defeat. He made a total of 17 appearances at Liberty Way before being recalled from his loan spell by Coventry manager Steven Pressley on 11 November; he also had his contract extended until the end of the 2015–16 season; Nuneaton went on to be relegated in last place at the end of the 2014–15 campaign.

He made his first-team debut for Coventry on 11 August 2015, in a League Cup first-round game at Rochdale, which the team lost on penalties after a 1–1 draw. Manager Tony Mowbray said that "he showed brilliant awareness and sharpness, his distribution was good and I was really pleased with him". Following an illness to Lee Burge, Charles-Cook made his league debut for Coventry at the Ricoh Arena in a 3–0 victory over Shrewsbury Town on 3 October. He held onto his first-team place after Burge's full recovery to fitness, keeping a further two clean sheets against Yeovil Town in the Football League Trophy and against Fleetwood Town in League One. He played the next two matches for Coventry against Blackpool and Rochdale respectively and kept clean sheets in both, which made him the first Coventry goalkeeper to keep clean sheets in his first four league games and also set a club post-war record for the most consecutive minutes without conceding a goal. He was also named on the Football League Team of the Week for 5–11 October. He signed a new contract in November to commit his future to the "Sky Blues" until June 2018.

Charles-Cook started the 2016–17 season as first choice goalkeeper for Coventry. However, he was dropped by interim manager Mark Venus after making an error which lead to a goal in a 2–2 draw with AFC Wimbledon on 28 September. Mowbray left the club the following day and Charles-Cook later said that he "was the first to properly trust me and was like a second dad to me, so when he left I didn't really take it well as I've never had someone's trust like that before". He played in five of the club's EFL Trophy games under Russell Slade, though both Slade and his successor, Mark Robins, opted for Burge in league matches. He was an unused substitute as Coventry beat Oxford United in the 2017 EFL Trophy final at Wembley. Speaking in July, Robins denied freezing Charles-Cook out of the first-team picture after signing Liam O'Brien.

=== Swindon Town ===
On 31 August 2017, Charles-Cook signed a two-year deal with League Two side Swindon Town. Following the suspension of first-choice goalkeeper, Lawrence Vigouroux, he made his debut for the "Robins" in their 2–1 away defeat against Cheltenham Town on 7 October. He held on to his first-team place following Vigouroux's return, as manager David Flitcroft felt his "all-round game has been fantastic and he fully deserves to keep his position". However his place at the County Ground was questioned after he conceded a number of late goals in February, which led to him being defended by caretaker manager Matt Taylor. He was dropped however, and featured just once under new boss Phil Brown before he was released by Swindon at the end of the 2017–18 season.

=== SønderjyskE ===
Charles-Cook spent time training with Crewe Alexandra, on the recommendation of his former goalkeeping coach Fred Barber. On 4 October 2018, he joined Danish Superliga side SønderjyskE on a deal until the end of the year; he was signed to provide competition for experienced German goalkeeper Sebastian Mielitz. He made one appearance at Haderslev in the fourth round of the Danish Cup on 7 November, a 2–1 loss after extra time to Esbjerg fB.

=== Shrewsbury Town ===
On 15 January 2019, Charles-Cook returned to English football when he signed for League One side Shrewsbury Town on a deal until the end of the 2018–19 season; manager Sam Ricketts said that he had acted quickly to fill the gap left by Joel Coleman's recall to Huddersfield Town. He never made his debut at the New Meadow, and instead sat on the bench behind first Steve Arnold then Jonathan Mitchell. He was offered a new contract by the "Shrews" in the summer, which he rejected.

=== Macclesfield Town ===
Charles-Cook signed for League Two side Macclesfield Town on a one-year deal on 9 August 2019; six days before manager Sol Campbell departed to Southend United. The good form of loanee Owen Evans meant that Charles-Cook featured in just three EFL Trophy group games under Daryl McMahon, before Evans was recalled to Wigan Athletic, which allowed Charles-Cook to make his league debut at Moss Rose under the stewardship of caretaker-manager Danny Whitaker in a 1–1 draw with Oldham Athletic on 11 January; Charles-Cook said that "I loved every minute of it and it's what I've been waiting for". Ironically though, new manager Mark Kennedy signed Jonathan Mitchell on loan from Derby County, who again kept Charles-Cook stuck on the bench. He was released on 24 June 2020.

=== Boreham Wood ===
Charles-Cook joined Boreham Wood on a short-team deal ahead of the National League playoffs in July 2020. He was released without making any appearances.

=== Welling United ===
Charles-Cook joined Welling United for the 2020–21 season.

=== Bromley ===
Having trained with the club, Charles-Cook signed for Bromley on 27 August 2021.

=== Hampton & Richmond Borough ===
On 15 March 2022, Charles-Cook made the move to Hampton & Richmond Borough in an emergency move after first-choice goalkeeper, Alan Julian tested positive for COVID-19.

=== Dartford ===
On 1 April 2022, Charles-Cook made the move to Dartford until the end of the season.

=== Return to Bromley ===
On 5 August 2022, it was announced that Charles-Cook had returned to Bromley, following a successful pre-season trial.

=== Indy Eleven ===
On 21 January 2025, USL Championship club Indy Eleven announced the signing of Charles-Cook ahead of their 2025 season. He made his debut for the club on 16 April, in a 1–0 victory over Miami FC in the U.S. Open Cup. His first league appearance came on 28 May in a 4–4 home draw against Hartford Athletic.

== International career ==
Born in England, Charles-Cook is of Grenadian and Jamaican descent. He was called up to represent the Grenada national football team for matches in June 2021. He debuted for Grenada in a 1–0 2022 FIFA World Cup qualification loss to Antigua and Barbuda on 4 June 2021.

== Style of play ==
Charles-Cook is a goalkeeper with shot stopping abilities and agility.

== Personal life ==
He is the brother of fellow professional footballers Anthony Cook, Roman Charles-Cook, and Regan Charles-Cook. His late uncle, James, was a former British and European super middleweight boxing champion.

== Career statistics ==
As of match played 31 March 2026

Appearances and goals by club, season and competition
Club	Season	League			National cup (Note: Includes FA Cup, Danish Cup)		League cup		Other		Total	
Club	Season	Division	Apps	Goals	Apps	Goals	Apps	Goals	Apps	Goals	Apps	Goals
Arsenal	2012–13	Premier League	0	0	0	0	0	0	0	0	0	0
Chelmsford City (loan)	2012–13	Conference South	3	0	0	0	—		0	0	3	0
Bury	2013–14	League Two	2	0	0	0	0	0	0	0	2	0
Coventry City	2014–15	League One	0	0	0	0	0	0	0	0	0	0
Coventry City	2015–16	League One	37	0	0	0	1	0	1 (Note: Appearance(s) in Football League Trophy)	0	39	0
Coventry City	2016–17	League One	15	0	0	0	2	0	5 (Note: Appearance(s) in EFL Trophy)	0	22	0
Coventry City	2017–18	League Two	0	0	0	0	0	0	0	0	0	0
Coventry City	Total		52	0	0	0	3	0	6	0	61	0
Nuneaton Town (loan)	2014–15	Conference Premier	17	0	0	0	—		0	0	17	0
Swindon Town	2017–18	League Two	22	0	1	0	0	0	2	0	25	0
SønderjyskE	2018–19	Danish Superliga	0	0	1	0	—		0	0	1	0
Shrewsbury Town	2018–19	League One	0	0	0	0	0	0	0	0	0	0
Macclesfield Town	2019–20	League Two	2	0	0	0	0	0	3	0	5	0
Boreham Wood	2019–20	National League	0	0	0	0	—		0	0	0	0
Welling United	2020–21	National League South	12	0	0	0	—		1 (Note: Appearance in FA Trophy)	0	13	0
Bromley	2021–22	National League	1	0	2	0	—		2	0	5	0
Hampton & Richmond Borough	2021–22	National League South	2	0	0	0	—		0	0	2	0
Dartford	2021–22	National League South	5	0	—		—		4 (Note: Three appearances in the Kent Senior Cup, one appearance in the National League South play-offs)	0	9	0
Bromley	2022–23	National League	32	0	0	0	—		2 (Note: Two appearances in the National League play-offs)	0	34	0
Havant & Waterlooville	2023–24	National League South	3	0	0	0	—		0	0	3	0
Welling United	2023–24	National League South	27	0	3	0	—		0	0	30	0
Indy Eleven	2025	USL Championship	4	0	2	0	1	0	0	0	7	0
Indy Eleven	2026	USL Championship	0	0	2	0	0	0	0	0	2	0
Career total			184	0	11	0	4	0	20	0	219	0

== Honours ==
Coventry City

- EFL Trophy: 2017

Dartford

- Kent Senior Cup: 2021–22
