= James Cook (boxer) =

Jamaican-born British boxer (1959–2025)

James Cook MBE (17 May 1959 – 7 June 2025) was a Jamaican-born European and British super middleweight boxing champion.

== Biography ==
Cook was born on 17 May 1959. In the 2007 Birthday Honours, he was appointed a Member of the Most Excellent Order of the British Empire (MBE) for services to Youth Justice in Hackney, London. Boxing Monthly noted the award came following "his outstanding work with the young people of Hackney's notorious Murder Mile". He also previously featured on the show The Secret Millionaire.

He was the uncle of professional footballers Anthony Cook, Reice Charles-Cook, Roman Charles-Cook, and Regan Charles-Cook.

Cook died of bladder cancer in London, on 7 June 2025, at the age of 66.
