= Regan Charles-Cook =

English footballer (born 1997)

Personal information
- Full name: Regan Evans Charles-Cook
- Date of birth: 14 February 1997 (age 29)
- Place of birth: Lewisham, England
- Height: 1.75 m (5 ft 9 in)
- Position: Winger

Team information
- Current team: Motherwell
- Number: 17

Youth career
- 2007–2013: Arsenal
- 2013–2015: Charlton Athletic

Senior career*
Years	Team	Apps	(Gls)
2015–2018	Charlton Athletic	1	(0)
2017	→ Solihull Moors (loan)	13	(4)
2017–2018	→ Woking (loan)	13	(4)
2018	→ Woking (loan)	10	(0)
2018–2020	Gillingham	41	(6)
2020–2022	Ross County	63	(13)
2022–2025	Eupen	89	(16)
2025–	Motherwell	24	(0)

International career^{‡}
2021–	Grenada	8	(1)
- * Club domestic league appearances and goals as of 20 May 2026 ‡ National team caps and goals as of 5:00, 7 September 2024 (UTC)

Regan Evans Charles-Cook (born 14 February 1997) is a professional footballer who plays as a winger for Scottish Premiership club Motherwell. Born in England, he plays for the Grenada national team.

== Club career ==
=== Charlton Athletic ===
Following a move from Arsenal in 2013, Charles-Cook made his professional debut for Charlton Athletic on 11 August 2015, playing 90 minutes at right back in a 4–1 League Cup victory over Dagenham & Redbridge.

On 4 February 2017, Charles-Cook joined National League side Solihull Moors on loan for the remainder of the campaign. A week later, during his debut for Solihull, Charles-Cook scored twice against Sutton United in their 3–0 victory. On 17 April 2017, Charles-Cook sealed Solihull Moors' 3–1 away victory against Macclesfield Town, netting the third goal in the 93rd minute. Charles-Cook returned to Charlton following the conclusion of the campaign, in which he scored four times in thirteen games.

Following an impressive loan spell with Solihull, Charles-Cook returned to Charlton for the 2017–18 pre-season. He scored his first goal for Charlton in a 2–1 EFL Cup win against Exeter City on 8 August 2017.

On 1 September 2017, Charles-Cook joined Woking on loan until January 2018. A day later, Charles-Cook made his Woking debut during their 3–1 away victory against Macclesfield Town, replacing Jason Banton in the 60th minute. On 16 September 2017, Charles-Cook scored both goals in Woking's 2–0 home victory over local rivals, Sutton United. In January 2018, Charles-Cook returned to Charlton after sustaining a long-term ankle injury whilst at Woking. On 8 March 2018, Charles-Cook rejoined Woking on loan until 28 April 2018. A day later, he marked his return, assisting Charlie Carter for his tenth goal of the season in Woking's 3–1 home defeat against FC Halifax Town.

=== Gillingham ===
Charles-Cook reportedly signed a new one-year contract with Charlton at the end of the 2017-18 season, however shortly afterwards he signed for Gillingham on 30 May 2018.

=== Ross County ===
On 30 June 2020, Charles-Cook joined Scottish Premiership club Ross County. He struggled in his first season, with him citing homesickness and not being able to visit his family due to COVID-19 restrictions as factors, and was in and out of the team. His second season saw him become a regular in the side under new manager Malky MacKay, with his improved form seeing him linked with moves to Aberdeen and Hibernian. On 28 January 2022, he scored one of Ross County's goals in a 3–3 draw with Rangers, making him at the time the top goalscorer in the Scottish Premiership on 10 goals.

=== Eupen ===
On 8 June 2022, Charles-Cook joined Belgian First Division A side Eupen on a free transfer, signing a three-year deal.

=== Motherwell ===
On 22 August 2025, Motherwell announced that Charles-Cook had signed with the club on a two year deal, marking his return to the Scottish Premiership.

== International career ==
On 1 July 2021, Charles-Cook was called up to Grenada's squad for the 2021 CONCACAF Gold Cup. He started all three matches as Grenada exited at the group stage, making his debut in the side's opening game of the tournament, a 4–0 defeat to Honduras.

== Personal life ==
Charles-Cook was born in England and is of Jamaican and Grenadian descent. He is the brother of fellow professional footballers Anthony Cook, Roman Charles-Cook and Reice Charles-Cook; they grew up with two other brothers in Beckenham. Charles-Cook's uncle, James Cook, is a former British super middleweight boxing champion.

== Career statistics ==
=== Club ===
As of match played 11 May 2024

Appearances and goals by club, season and competition
Club	Season	League			National cup (Note: Includes FA Cup, Scottish Cup, Belgian Cup)		League cup (Note: Includes EFL Cup, Scottish League Cup)		Other		Total	
Club	Season	Division	Apps	Goals	Apps	Goals	Apps	Goals	Apps	Goals	Apps	Goals
Charlton Athletic	2015–16	Championship	1	0	1	0	2	0	–		4	0
Charlton Athletic	2016–17	League One	0	0	0	0	0	0	1 (Note: Appearances in EFL Trophy)	0	1	0
Charlton Athletic	2017–18	League One	0	0	0	0	2	1	2	0	4	1
Charlton Athletic	Total		1	0	1	0	4	1	3	0	9	1
Solihull Moors (loan)	2016–17	National League	13	4	0	0	—		0	0	13	4
Woking (loan)	2017–18	National League	23	4	5	2	—		1 (Note: Appearance in FA Trophy)	0	29	6
Gillingham	2018–19	League One	26	3	4	0	1	0	0	0	31	3
Gillingham	2019–20	League One	15	3	2	0	1	0	3	0	21	3
Gillingham	Total		41	6	6	0	2	0	3	0	52	6
Ross County	2020–21	Scottish Premiership	26	0	1	0	5	2	—		32	2
Ross County	2021–22	Scottish Premiership	37	13	0	0	0	0	—		37	13
Ross County	Total		63	13	1	0	5	2	0	0	69	15
Eupen	2022–23	Belgian Pro League	31	6	1	0	–		—		32	6
Eupen	2023–24	Belgian Pro League	32	4	0	0	–		—		32	4
Eupen	2024–25	Challenger Pro League	0	0	0	0	–		—		0	0
Eupen	Total		63	10	1	0	0	0	0	0	64	10
Career total			203	37	14	2	11	3	7	0	235	42

=== International ===
As of match played 6 September 2024

Appearances and goals by national team and year
National team	Year	Apps	Goals
Grenada	2021	3	0
Grenada	2022	1	0
Grenada	2023	3	0
Grenada	2024	1	1
Total		8	1

== Honours ==
Individual

- PFA Scotland Team of the Year: 2021–22 Scottish Premiership
- Scottish Premiership Top Scorer: 2021–22 (shared)
- Scottish Premiership Player of the Month: January 2022
