= Loïc Mesanvi =

Togolese footballer (born 2003)

Personal information
- Full name: Loïc Ekoue Mesanvi
- Date of birth: 6 October 2003 (age 23)
- Place of birth: Lomé, Togo
- Height: 1.72 m (5 ft 8 in)
- Positions: Midfielder; forward

Team information
- Current team: Indy Eleven
- Number: 90

Senior career*
Years	Team	Apps	(Gls)
2022	Minneapolis City SC	20	(15)
2022–2025	Minnesota United 2	60	(10)
2024–2025	Minnesota United	6	(0)
2026–	Indy Eleven	29	(1)
- * Club domestic league appearances and goals as of 19:17, 7 November 2026 (UTC)

Loïc Ekoue Mesanvi (born 6 October 2003) is a Togolese footballer who plays as a striker for Indy Eleven of the USL Championship.

== Early life ==
Mesanvi was born in 2003 in Togo. He moved to Ghana at the age of thirteen.

== Education ==
Mesanvi attended Lakeville South High School in the United States. He helped the soccer team win the league.

== Career ==
Mesanvi started his career with American side Minnesota United. On 25 February 2024, he debuted for the club during a 2–1 win over Austin FC.

On March 2, 2026, USL Championship side Indy Eleven announced they had signed Mesanvi.

== Style of play ==
Mesanvi mainly operates as a striker. He is known for his speed.
