= Mikah Thomas =

American soccer player (born 2005)

Personal information
- Date of birth: February 21, 2005 (age 21)
- Place of birth: Gainesville, FL
- Position: Defender

Team information
- Current team: Charlotte FC The loan ended with Indy
- Number: 24

College career
Years	Team	Apps	(Gls)
2023–2024	UConn Huskies	19	(1)

Senior career*
Years	Team	Apps	(Gls)
2023	Jacksonville Armada U-23	0	(0)
2025–	Charlotte FC	0	(0)
2025-2026	→ Crown Legacy FC (loan)	23	(2)
2026–	→ Indy Eleven (loan)	0	(0)
- * Club domestic league appearances and goals as of March 16, 2026

Mikah Thomas (born February 21, 2005) is an American professional soccer player who plays as a defender for Indy Eleven of the USL Championship on loan from Major League Soccer club Charlotte FC. He was selected by Charlotte FC with the 9th overall pick of the 2025 MLS SuperDraft.

== College career ==
Thomas played for UConn from 2023 until 2024. As a freshman in 2023, Thomas appeared in 8 games with 3 starts, recording 0 goals and 2 assists during the season. In 2023, he helped the Huskies to a 9-8-1 record and a second round exit in the Big East championship. As a sophomore in 2024, Thomas appeared in 11 games with 5 starts, recording 1 goal and 1 assist. In 2024, the Huskies finished with a 8-4-6 record and a first round exit in the Big East championship.

== Club career ==
Thomas played a match with National Premier Soccer League team Jacksonville Armada U-23, the developmental team of Jacksonville Armada, in the first round of the 2023 U.S. Open Cup against Miami United. Thomas scored the opening goal in the first half, but received a second yellow card in the second half as was sent off following Miami United's equalizer, but Jacksonville won the following penalty shoot-out.

=== Charlotte FC ===
On December 20, 2024, Thomas was selected ninth overall in the first round of the 2025 MLS SuperDraft by Charlotte FC. On February 20, 2025, Thomas signed a two-year contract with Charlotte FC with club options for 2027, 2028, and 2029. Thomas made his professional debut on March 7, 2025, for Charlotte FC's reserve affiliate, Crown Legacy FC in the season opening MLS Next Pro match against New York City FC II. The game would end 2–2, but Crown Legacy would lose the penalty shoot-out.

=== Indy Eleven ===
On March 12, 2026, Indy Eleven of the USL Championship announced they had acquired Thomas on loan from Charlotte FC for the 2026 season.
