= National Institute for Fitness and Sport =

Building in Indianapolis, Indiana

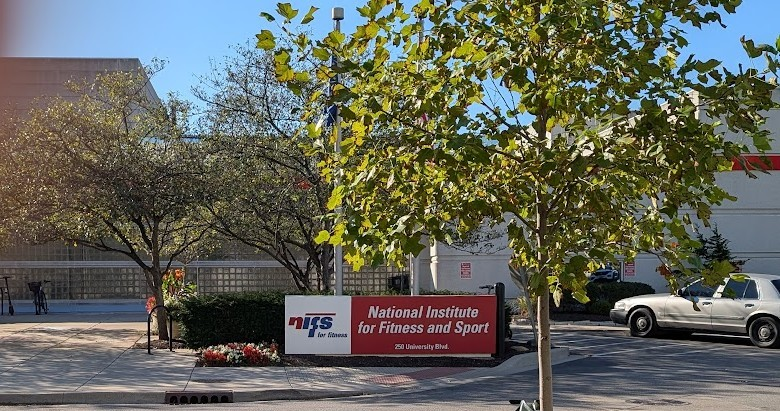
- NIFS building in 2025

General information
- Location: 250 University Blvd, Indianapolis, Indiana 46202
- Coordinates: 39°46′8.605″N 86°10′26.698″W
- Completed: 1987
- Opened: November 1, 1988
- Cost: $12 million
- Owner: Indiana University Indianapolis

Design and construction
- Architects: Browning, Day, Dierdorf, Inc.

Website
- www.nifs.org

The National Institute for Sports and Fitness (NIFS) building was constructed in 1987. The building works with the IU School of Physical Education and Tourism Management. The building is located on the IU Indianapolis campus and in White River State Park. The fitness center was constructed alongside the Michael A. Carroll Track & Soccer Stadium and the Natatorium to position IU Indianapolis as a major physical education and sports leader for the city. The Indianapolis Tennis Center and the other facilities would host a series of events, competitions, and programs in conjunction with the city of Indianapolis and IUPUI.

== History ==
In June 1983, the President's Council on Physical Fitness and Sport announced that Indianapolis was one of the potential sites for a United States fitness academy. Indianapolis community and business leaders pushed for the center by committing significant funds towards its establishment. The establishment of the National Institute for Fitness and Sports (NIFS) was part of Indianapolis's urban renewal strategy to become a national leader in amateur sports.

The National Institute for Sports and Fitness located on the IUPUI campus was constructed in 1987 by Browning, Day, Dierdorf, Inc. The 120,000 square-foot facility received $6 million from Lilly Endowment, inc., $3 million from the State government, and $3 million from the City of Indianapolis. Huber, Hunt, and Nichols Inc. was approved as construction manager for the National Institute of Fitness and Sport. The institute officially opened on November 1, 1988. The building is owned by IUPUI and leased to the NIFS organization.

The White River State Park Commission voted to begin construction on the new fitness center on March 12, 1986. The commission paid the Acme-Evans Company $1 million for acreage needed for construction. The first phase of excavation and construction was completed by Walker and Associates, and the Glenroy Construction Company. The institute was planned to include human performance laboratories, indoor gymnastics training facilities, an indoor track, and administrative and instructional areas, as well as housing for participants in programs at the institute. The institute was also planning on using office space to publish fitness publications and assist in physical health research.

== See also ==
- Indiana University–Purdue University Indianapolis Public Art Collection
