= IU Michael A. Carroll Track & Soccer Stadium =

Outdoor track and soccer stadium in Indianapolis, Indiana, US

- Carroll Stadium · Carroll Stadium Soccer Field

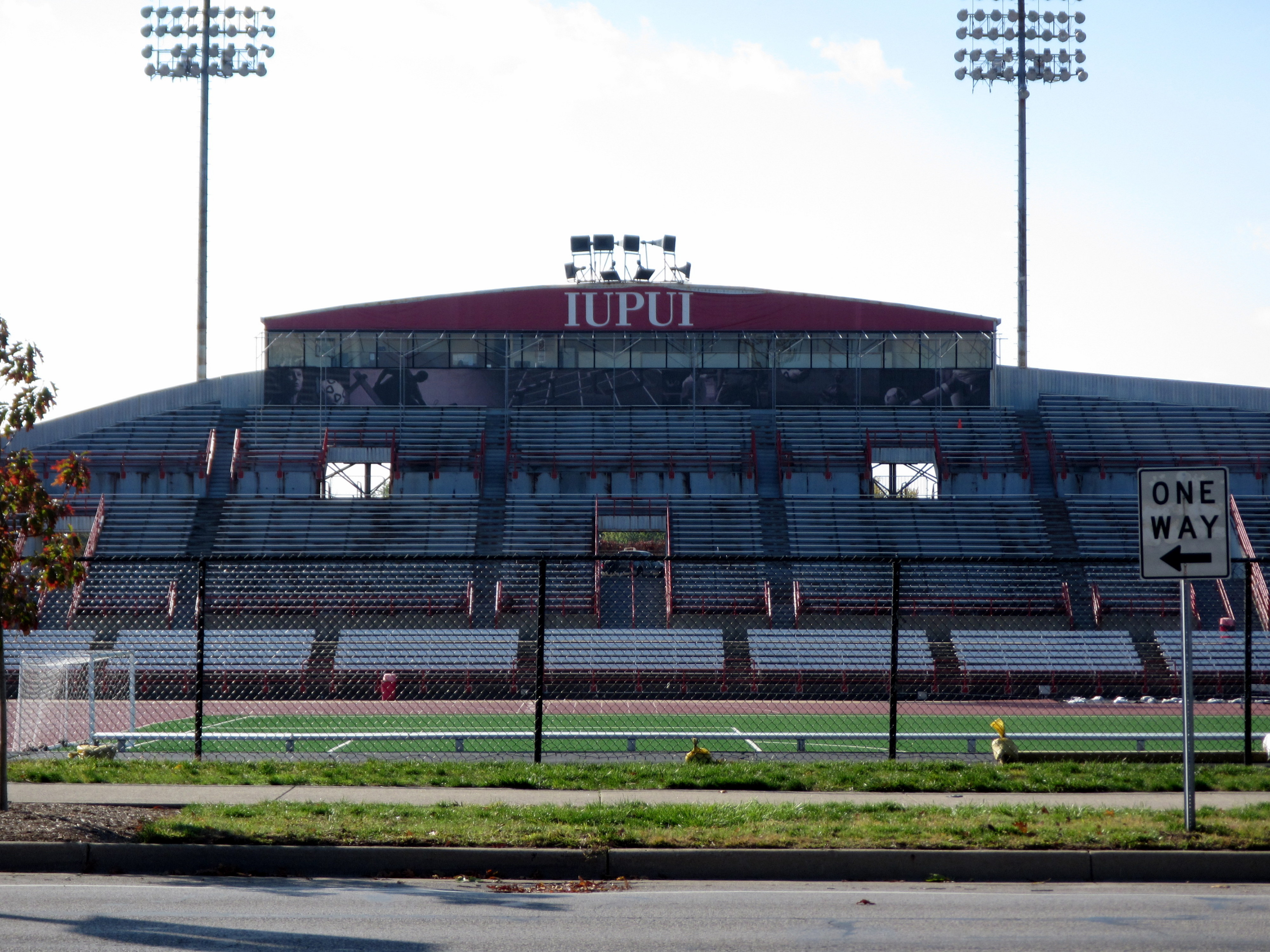
- Exterior view of the stadium in 2012
- Interactive map of IU Michael A. Carroll; Track & Soccer Stadium
- Address: 1001 W New York St. Indianapolis; United States
- Coordinates: 39°46′16.1256″N 86°10′40.368″W
- Owner: Indiana University Indianapolis
- Operator: IU Indianapolis Athletics
- Capacity: 12,111 (can be limited to 10,524 for soccer games)
- Type: Stadium
- Surface: FieldTurf
- Current use: Soccer; Track and field

Construction
- Opened: 1982; 44 years ago
- Renovated: 2013–2014
- Cost: $7 million

Tenants
- IU Indy Jaguars (NCAA) soccer and track and field; Indy Eleven (NASL/USLC) (2014–2017, 2019, 2021–present); 1987 Pan-American Games

Website
- carrollstadium.indianapolis.iu

IU Michael A. Carroll Track & Soccer Stadium is a 12,100-seat soccer and track and field stadium located in Indianapolis, Indiana, United States. It is the home of the Indiana University Indianapolis (IU Indy) Jaguars track and field and soccer teams. It is also the home of Indy Eleven.

The stadium is named for Indianapolis civic leader Michael A. Carroll. The stadium was built in 1982 for $7 million as a track and field venue. The facility has hosted the Athletics Competitions of the 1987 Pan American Games, 2001 World Police and Fire Games, several USA Outdoor Track and Field Championships and NCAA Championships as well as the 1988 US Olympic Trials where Florence Griffith-Joyner set the women's 100 metres world record of 10.49 that stands to this day. The site features a 400-meter Mondo track with eight lanes.

The stadium was renovated in 2013–2014 to accommodate Indy Eleven. As part of Indy Eleven's move to the United Soccer League in 2018, the team moved to Lucas Oil Stadium but returned for the 2019 playoff season.

== History ==
The Michael A. Carroll Track & Soccer Stadium was built in 1982 and designed by Browning, Day, Pollack, Mullins, Corp. The construction was first approved in December 1980 to give Indiana University–Purdue University Indianapolis (IUPUI) and Indianapolis an additional facility to host large sporting events. The complex would also include four softball fields, a combination football/soccer field, and four outdoor basketball courts.

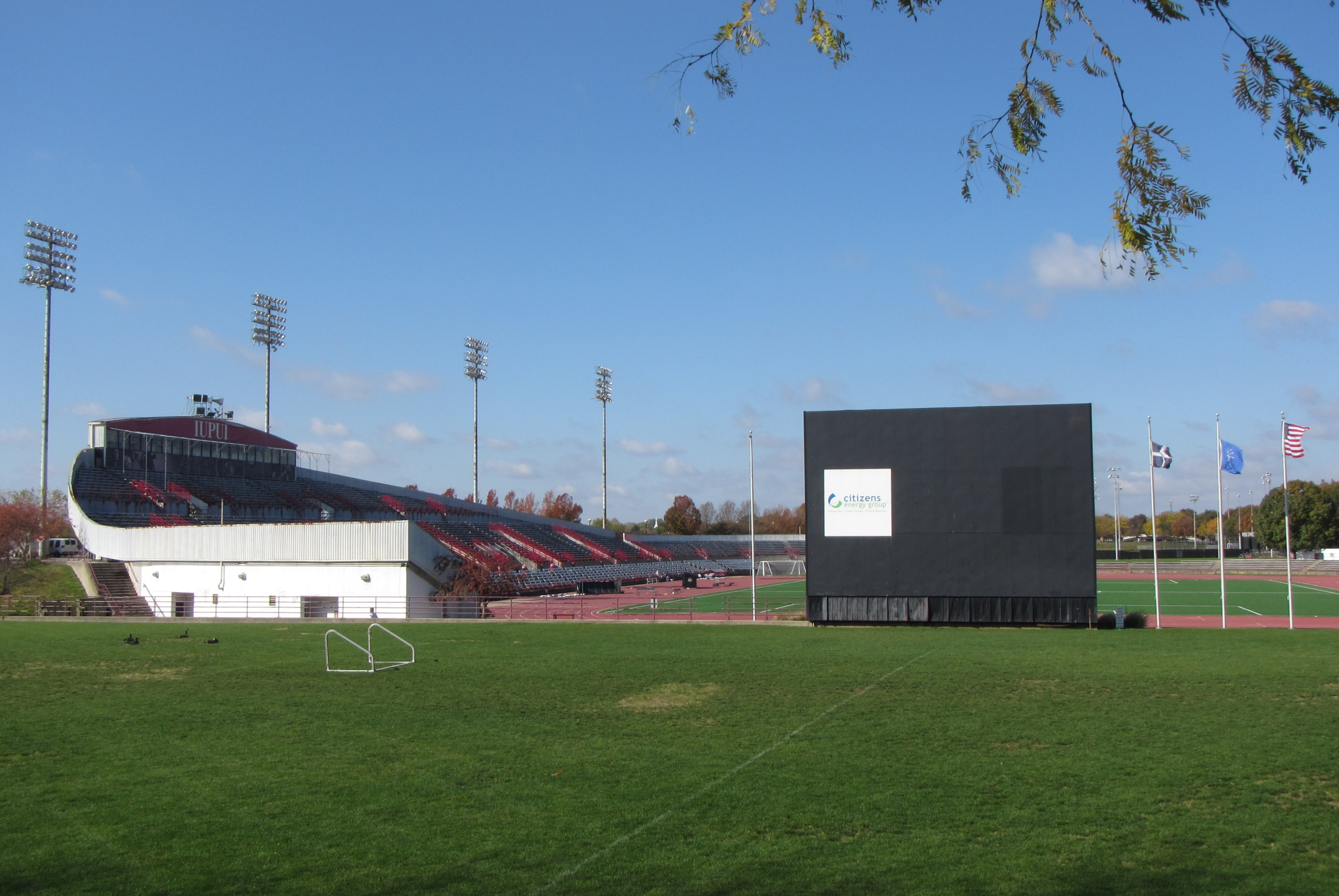
Auxiliary field and stands in 2012

The construction was completed in the summer of 1982 alongside the IU Natatorium leading into the National Sports Festival. This marked the beginning of the IUPUI positioning itself as a major leader in amateur sports for the Indianapolis community and physical education with the completion of the National Institute for Fitness and Sport in 1987. The stadium is also referred to as the IU Track Stadium and the IUPUI Track Stadium in various publications at this time. In 1993, the stadium was recorded as being capable of seating 19,800 spectators.

In 1997, the stadium had a new drainage system, track surface, and soccer field installed to expand and update the facilities. The infield was reconstructed to accommodate field sports such as soccer, rugby, and lacrosse. In 1998, a new timing, scoring, and scoreboard were installed, including digital photo-finish timing equipment. In 2012, the interior field of the stadium was removed and replaced with a synthetic turf surface.

When IUPUI was dissolved in 2024 and replaced by separate institutions affiliated with the Indiana University and Purdue University systems, the stadium was inherited by the new IU Indy.

== Namesake ==
The stadium is named after Michael A. Carroll (Feb. 9, 1941-Sept. 11, 1992), deputy mayor of Indianapolis from 1970 to 1976. As deputy mayor, Carroll played a key role in many construction projects throughout Indianapolis. In 1984, Carroll became vice president for community development at Lilly Endowment, Inc. Carroll died on September 11, 1992, in a mid-air collision in southern Marion County alongside Frank E. McKinney Jr., Robert V. Welch, and John R. Weliever. The Indianapolis Business Journal established the Michael A. Carroll award in 1993 for his role in the development of Indianapolis.

== Notable events ==
- 1987 Pan American Games
- 1988 US Olympic Trials
- 1999 Komen Race for the Cure
- 2000 Komen Race for the Cure
- 2000 AIDS Walks and Festivals
- 2001 19th Corporate Challenge
- 2001 World Police and Fire Games
- 2001 9th Annual Citizen Gas Race for Heat
- 2003 21st Corporate Challenge
- 2004 March of Dimes Walk
- 2006 USA Outdoor and Junior Track & Field Championships
- 2007 USA Outdoor and Junior Track & Field Championships

== See also ==
- List of soccer stadiums in the United States
- List of attractions and events in Indianapolis
- Sports in Indianapolis
