= 2022 Richmond Kickers season =

Richmond Kickers
2022 season
- Owner: 22 Holdings, LLC
- Head coach: Darren Sawatzky
- Stadium: City Stadium
- USL League One: 1st
- USL1 Playoffs: Semifinalist
- U.S. Open Cup: Fourth round
- Top goalscorer: League: Terzaghi (18); All: Terzaghi (19)
- Highest home attendance: 6,000 vs. GVL (October 15)
- Lowest home attendance: 2,011 vs. CHA (April 9)
- Average home league attendance: 3,173
- Biggest win: 4–0 vs. TUC (April 2)
- Biggest defeat: 1–5 vs. CLT (May 11, USOC)
Home colors	Away colors	Third colors

The 2022 Richmond Kickers season was the club's 30th season of existence, their fourth season in USL League One, and their 18th season in the third tier of American soccer. The Kickers were led by third-year head coach, Darren Sawatzky. The USL League One season started on April 2 and concluded on October 15, 2022.

The Kickers had their strongest regular season showing since 2013, winning the USL League One regular season title. The Kickers finished the season with 51 total points, five clear of second place, with 14 wins, seven losses, and nine draws. Striker, Emiliano Terzaghi, for the third season, led the Kickers and USL League One in goals with 18 goals.

Outside of USL League One, the Kickers participated in the 2022 U.S. Open Cup, and the 2022 USL League One Playoffs, for their first-place finish during the regular season. The Kickers reached the fourth round of the Open Cup, before losing to Major League Soccer expansion side, Charlotte FC. The Kickers will begin the Playoffs in the semifinal round on October 29.

== Background ==
The Kickers began the 2021 season in April due to the ongoing issues surrounding the COVID-19 pandemic. Most of the regular season had the Kickers routinely along the playoff line, before a six-match winning streak in September saw the club finish in fifth place, and qualify for the USL Playoffs, marking the first time since 2016 the Kickers qualified for the playoffs. In the playoffs, the Kickers were eliminated by FC Tucson in the opening round.

Striker Emiliano Terzaghi was the league's top scorer, scoring 18 goals.

== Transfers ==
=== Transfers in ===
Date	Position	No.	Name	From	Fee/notes	Ref.
December 14, 2021	MF	8	(United States) Ethan Bryant	(United States) San Antonio FC	Loan option exercised	
December 16, 2021	FW	9	(England) Matt Bentley	(England) Leatherhead	Free	
January 20, 2022	DF	22	(United States) Stephen Payne	(Portugal) Vilaverdense	Free	
January 25, 2022	DF	5	(United States) Stuart Ritchie	(Germany) Hannover 96	Free	
February 3, 2022	MF	11	(Argentina) Leonardo Baima	(Argentina) Central Norte	Free	
February 8, 2022	MF	27	(England) Chandler O'Dwyer	(United States) Christian Brothers Buccaneers	Free	
February 9, 2022	MF	99	(Colombia) Vincenzo Candela	(United States) Tormenta	Free	
February 10, 2022	DF	2	(United States) Dakota Barnathan	(United States) FC Tucson	Free	
February 15, 2022	MF	20	(El Salvador) Christian Molina	(United States) Union Omaha	Free	
February 17, 2022	GK	29	(United States) Eli Mumford	(United States) Richmond Kickers Academy	Academy contract	
February 22, 2022	MF	4	(United States) Simon Fitch	(United States) VCU Rams	Free	
March 31, 2022	FW	23	(United States) David Olsen	(United States) Tacoma Defiance	Free	

=== Transfers out ===
Date	Position	No.	Name	To	Fee/notes	Ref.

Date	Position	No.	Name	Loan to	Until	Ref.
April 1, 2022	GK	31	(United States) Eli Mumford	(United States) Grove Soccer United	End of season	

== Non-competitive ==
=== Preseason exhibitions ===
February 12	Loudoun United	1–2	Richmond Kickers	Leesburg, VA
14:00 EDT	Liadi 66'	Report	Terzaghi 34'; Bentley 61'	Stadium: Segra Field; Attendance: 0

February 19	Richmond Kickers	1–1	Chowan Hawks	Wyndham, VA
14:00 EST				Stadium: Striker Soccer Complex

February 24	High Point Panthers	1–1	Richmond Kickers	High Point, NC
12:00 EST				Stadium: Vert Stadium; Attendance: 192

February 26	Richmond Kickers	0–0	Loudoun United	Wyndham, VA
14:00 EST				Stadium: Striker Soccer Complex; Attendance: 0

March 2	Charleston Battery	1–1	Richmond Kickers	Buies Creek, NC
12:00 EST	Williams 24'	Report	Terzaghi 64'	Stadium: Eakes Athletics Complex; Attendance: 135

March 5	UNCG Spartans	2–2	Richmond Kickers	Greensboro, NC
13:00 EST				Stadium: UNCG Soccer Stadium

March 9	Richmond Kickers	2–1	William & Mary Tribe	Richmond, VA
13:00 EST	Bolduc 26', 63'	Report	Nwegbo 8'	Stadium: City Stadium; Attendance: 352

March 18	Richmond Kickers	1–1	VCU Rams	Richmond, VA
14:00 EDT	Barnathan 32'	Report	McGann 56'	Stadium: City Stadium; Attendance: 492

March 26	Richmond Kickers	3–1	James Madison Dukes	Richmond, VA
18:30 EDT	Crisler 23'; Bentley 75'; Terzaghi 86'	Report	Erhardt 64'	Stadium: City Stadium; Attendance: 0

== Competitive ==
=== USL League One ===
==== Standings ====
Pos	Team	Pld	W	L	T	GF	GA	GD	Pts	Qualification
1	Richmond Kickers (X)	30	14	7	9	54	35	+19	51	Qualification for the semi-finals
2	Greenville Triumph SC	30	12	8	10	40	38	+2	46	Qualification for the semi-finals
3	Tormenta FC (C)	30	12	9	9	42	40	+2	45	Qualification for the play-offs
4	Chattanooga Red Wolves SC	30	12	11	7	52	39	+13	43	Qualification for the play-offs
5	Union Omaha	30	10	7	13	34	33	+1	43	Qualification for the play-offs

Source: USL League One
Rules for classification: 1) points; 2) total wins; 3) total goal differential; 4) total goals scored; 5) points earned against top four Conference finishers; 6) disciplinary points; 7) drawing of lots.
(C) Champions; (X) Regular Season Champion

==== Results summary ====
Overall								Home						Away					
Pld	W	D	L	GF	GA	GD	Pts	W	D	L	GF	GA	GD	W	D	L	GF	GA	GD
2	1	1	0	5	1	+4	4	1	1	0	5	1	+4	0	0	0	0	0	0

Last updated: April 10, 2022.
Source: USL League One

==== Results by matchday ====
Game Week	1	2	3	4	5
Stadium	H	H	A	A	H
Result	W	D	L	W	L
Position	1	1	3	2	6

Updated to match(es) played on April 2022. Source: USL League One
A = Away; H = Home; W = Win; D = Draw; L = Loss; P = Postponed
Notes: Positions show the situation at the end of the corresponding Game Weeks (GW); not the position at the conclusion of matches or game days

==== Match results ====
April 2 1	Richmond Kickers	4–0	FC Tucson	Richmond, VA
19:00 EDT	Terzaghi 18'; Aune (yellow card) 23'; Vinyals 34', 60' (yellow card) 58'; Payne (yellow card) 55'; Barnathan (yellow card) 68'; Bentley 81'; Olsen (yellow card) 90+2'	Report	Sunday (yellow card) 21'; Allen (yellow card) 66'; Moss (red card) 85'	Stadium: City Stadium; Attendance: 4,054; Referee: Danielle Chesky

April 9 2	Richmond Kickers	1–1	Northern Colorado Hailstorm	Richmond, VA
18:30 EDT	Morán (yellow card) 11'; Aune (yellow card) 51'; Terzaghi 55' (yellow card) 78'; Bolduc (yellow card) 62'	Report	Damm (yellow card) 16'; Folla (yellow card) 23'; Vanacore-Decker 37'; Zayed (yellow card) 45'; Ulysse (yellow card) 59'; Desdunes (yellow card) 88'	Stadium: City Stadium; Attendance: 2,771; Referee: Matt Franz

April 16 3	Chattanooga Red Wolves	1–0	Richmond Kickers	Chattanooga, TN
19:00 EDT	Capozucchi (yellow card) 26'; Espinoza 50', (yellow card) 75'; Avilez (yellow card) 83'; Hernández (yellow card) 90+6'	Report	Morán (yellow card) 84'; Aune (yellow card) 90+1'; Terzaghi (yellow card) 90+5'	Stadium: CHI Memorial Stadium; Attendance: 2,236; Referee: Joshua Belk

April 24 4	Charlotte Independence	1–2	Richmond Kickers	Charlotte, NC
16:00 EDT	Dutey 37'; Talboys (yellow card) 62'; Mbuyu (red card) 69'	Report	Terzaghi 6' (yellow card) 52'; Baima (yellow card) 23'; Bentley 55'; Cole (yellow card) 71'	Stadium: American Legion Memorial Stadium; Attendance: 2,247; Referee: Alex Billeter

May 7 5	Richmond Kickers	0–1	Forward Madison	Richmond, VA
19:00 EDT	Terzaghi (yellow card) 33'; Crisler (yellow card) 36'; Vinyals (yellow card) 45+2'; Aune (yellow card) 63'	Report	Cassini (yellow card) 9'; Jones (yellow card) 14'; Murillo (yellow card) 19'; Osmond (yellow card) 53'; Crisler 67' (o.g.); Breno (yellow card) 90+1'	Stadium: City Stadium; Attendance: 2,135; Referee: Nickrod Fateh

May 14 6	Richmond Kickers	1–1	Union Omaha	Richmond, VA
19:00 EDT	Terzaghi (yellow card) 37'; Gordon 41'; Ritchie (yellow card) 45+6'; Barnathan (yellow card) 59'; Morán (yellow card) 69'; Payne (yellow card) 86'	Report	Meza 26'; Touche (yellow card) 62'; Bawa (yellow card) 75'	Stadium: City Stadium; Attendance: 2,579; Referee: Ben Meyer

May 28 8	North Carolina FC	2–1	Richmond Kickers	Cary, NC
19:00 EDT	McLaughlin 36', 42' (pen.); Skelton (yellow card) 37'; Fernandes (yellow card) 65'	Report	Terzaghi 13'; Bentley (yellow card) 28'; Aune (yellow card) 35'; Ritchie (yellow card) 64'	Stadium: WakeMed Soccer Park; Attendance: 1,128; Referee: Katherine McCormick

June 1 9	Richmond Kickers	3–0	Chattanooga Red Wolves	Richmond, VA
19:00 EDT	Candela (yellow card) 17'; Aune 35'; Crisler 38'; Baima 45+2', (yellow card) 80'; Morán (yellow card) 58'	Report	Bement (yellow card) 8'; Benton (yellow card) 31'; Cardona (yellow card) 77'	Stadium: City Stadium; Attendance: 2,011; Referee: John Matto

June 4 10	Richmond Kickers	2–2	Tormenta	Richmond, VA
19:00 EDT	Ritchie 27'; Crisler 32'; Payne (yellow card) 76'	Report	Sharifi 22'; Thorn (yellow card) 30'; Billhardt 64'	Stadium: City Stadium; Attendance: 3,201; Referee: Anya Voigt

June 11 11	Richmond Kickers	4–0	Charlotte Independence	Richmond, VA
19:00 EDT	Bryant 14', 45+4'; Bentley 21', 74'; Fitch (yellow card) 38'	Report	Vint (yellow card) 44'; Dutey (yellow card) 54'; Ciss (yellow card) 67'; Rocha (yellow card) 68'	Stadium: City Stadium; Attendance: 3,041; Referee: Nicholas Karnovsky

June 18 12	Richmond Kickers	3–2	Northern Colorado Hailstorm	Richmond, VA
19:00 EDT	Vinyals (yellow card) 33', (goal) 42'; Bentley (yellow card) 43'; Terzaghi 45+2'; Bolanos 76'; Fitzgerald (yellow card) 90+4'	Report	Vanacore-Decker (yellow card) 25'; Norman (yellow card) 27' (yellow-red card) 29'; Cornwall (yellow card) 52', (goal) 68'; Folla (yellow card) 74', (goal) 88'	Stadium: City Stadium; Attendance: 3,099; Referee: Amiel Aleman

June 23 13	Forward Madison	2–1	Richmond Kickers	Madison, WI
20:00 EDT	Thiam (yellow card) 35'; Streng 79'; Cassini 82', (yellow card) 83'; Dean (yellow card) 89'	Report	Crisler (yellow card) 36'; Vinyals 45+3'; Gordon (yellow card) 65'; Ritchie (yellow card) 76'; Bentley (yellow card) 77'; Morán (yellow card) 82'	Stadium: Breese Stevens Field; Attendance: 4,082; Referee: Brian Wood

June 29 7	FC Tucson	0–1	Richmond Kickers	Tucson, AZ
22:00 EDT	Weir (yellow card) 45+2'	Report	Terzaghi (yellow card) 25'; Bolanos 60'	Stadium: Kino North Stadium; Attendance: 1,688; Referee: Cristian Campo Hernández
Note: Match rescheduled from May 20 due to multiple COVID positives in the Kickers' organization.

July 2 14	Richmond Kickers	4–1	North Carolina FC	Richmond, VA
19:00 EDT	Bentley (yellow card) 25'; Payne (yellow card) 38'; Terzaghi 59', 79'; Bolanos 63', (yellow card) 64'; Gordon 75'	Report	Young (yellow card) 33'; Anderson 41', (yellow card) 42'; Sommersall (yellow card) 65'	Stadium: City Stadium; Attendance: 4,702; Referee: Thomas Snyder

July 8 15	Charlotte Independence	1–1	Richmond Kickers	Charlotte, NC
19:00 EDT	Mbuyu (yellow card) 18'; Amaya (yellow card) 58'; Ibarra 65' (pen.); Rocha (yellow card) 88'	Report	Candela (yellow card) 43'; Bolanos (yellow card) 56'; Gordon 68'	Stadium: American Legion Memorial Stadium; Attendance: 1,544; Referee: Kevin Broadley

July 16 16	Richmond Kickers	1–3	Greenville Triumph	Richmond, VA
19:00 EDT	Gordon (yellow card) 42'; Bryant (yellow card) 52'; Ritchie (yellow card) 61'; Bentley 72'; Barnathan (yellow card) 87'; Pavone (red card) 90+4'	Report	Labovitz 23', 36', 89'; Smart (yellow card) 69'; Gavilanes (yellow card) 75'; Pilato (yellow card) 82'; Fenton (yellow card) 85'	Stadium: City Stadium; Attendance: 4,143; Referee: Nickrod Fateh

July 23 17	Central Valley Fuego	3–1	Richmond Kickers	Fresno, CA
22:00 EDT	Falck 16', 35'; Hornsby (yellow card) 45'; Partida (yellow card) 53'; Cerritos 58'; Strong (yellow card) 63'	Report	Payne (yellow card) 15' (yellow-red card) 19'; Barnathan 45', (yellow card) 76'; Aune (red card) 48'; Fitzgerald (yellow card) 56'; Candela (yellow card) 90+3'	Stadium: Fresno State Soccer Stadium; Attendance: 1,345; Referee: Adrian Gonzalez

July 27 18	North Carolina FC	2–3	Richmond Kickers	Cary, NC
19:00 EDT	Adams 26'; Flick 78'	Report	Molina 59' (o.g.); Terzaghi 90+1'; Barnathan 90+5'	Stadium: WakeMed Soccer Park; Attendance: 1,109; Referee: Josiah Parke

August 2 19	Northern Colorado Hailstorm	0–1	Richmond Kickers	Windsor, CO
21:00 EDT	Damm (yellow card) 28'; Rogers (yellow card) 39'; Nortey (yellow card) 63'	Report	Terzaghi 32', (yellow card) 47'; Vinyals (yellow card) 85'; Fitzgerald (yellow card) 90'	Stadium: Future Legends Complex; Attendance: 4,759; Referee: Kevin Fikar

August 6 20	Richmond Kickers	3–1	FC Tucson	Richmond, VA
19:00 EDT	Morán (yellow card) 26'; Vanacore-Decker 45'; Terzaghi 56', 64'	Report	Machell (yellow card) 20'; Calixtro 28'; Garcia (red card) 76'	Stadium: City Stadium; Attendance: 3,170; Referee: John Matto

August 13 21	Greenville Triumph	1–0	Richmond Kickers	Greenville, SC
19:00 EDT	Brown 90'; Polak (yellow card) 90+6'	Report	Terzaghi (yellow card) 90+3'	Stadium: Legacy Early College Field; Attendance: 2,924; Referee: Kyle Johnston

August 20 22	Central Valley Fuego	2–2	Richmond Kickers	Fresno, CA
19:00 EDT	Falck 24' (yellow card) 32'; Smith (yellow card) 36'; Villarreal (yellow card) 57'; North (yellow card) 60'; Schenfeld 67'	Report	Bolanos (yellow card) 38'; Aune (yellow card) 57'; Terzaghi 70' (pen.); Bentley 90+3'	Stadium: Fresno State Soccer Stadium; Attendance: 1,193; Referee: Robert Vincze

August 27 23	Richmond Kickers	3–0	Union Omaha	Richmond, VA
19:00 EDT	Bolanos 20'; Payne (yellow card) 45+12'; Vanacore-Decker (yellow card) 66'; Terzaghi 70', 76'	Report	Jiba (yellow card) 69'; Meza (yellow card) 72'; Doyle (yellow card) 72'	Stadium: City Stadium; Attendance: 4,886; Referee: Matthew Franz

September 7 24	Richmond Kickers	3–1	Tormenta	Richmond, VA
19:00 EDT	Terzaghi (yellow card) 21', (goal) 55'; Morán (yellow card) 68'; Bolanos 72', 90+4'; Aune (yellow card) 78'; Candela (yellow card) 90+3'	RIC Report; Soccerway Rpt	Billhardt (penalty scored) 10'; Dengler (yellow card) 23'; Nembhard (yellow card) 23'; Phelps (yellow card) 34'; Adeniyi (yellow card) 82'; Bush (yellow card) 90+5'	Stadium: City Stadium; Referee: Katherine McCormick

September 14 25	Union Omaha	2–3	Richmond Kickers	Papillion, NE
19:00 EDT	Scearce (penalty scored) 49', 81'; Gil (yellow card) 77'; Touche (yellow card) 90+5'; Doyle (yellow card) 90+7'	Report	Vanacore-Decker 78'; Gordon (yellow card) 80'; Payne 89'; Vinyals (penalty scored) 90+7'	Stadium: Werner Park; Attendance: 2,610; Referee: Gerald Flores

September 17 26	Chattanooga Red Wolves	2–2	Richmond Kickers	Chattanooga, TN
19:00 EDT	Tejera (yellow card) 35'; Lombardi (yellow card) 49' (yellow-red card) 74'; Navarro (yellow card) 68'; Espinoza 69'; Mehl 78', (yellow card) 84'; Galindrez (yellow card) 90+3'	Report	Bolanos (yellow card) 31'; Ritchie (yellow card) 37'; Terzaghi (penalty scored) 43'; Gordon 51'	Stadium: CHI Memorial Stadium; Referee: Alyssa Nichols

September 24 27	Richmond Kickers	1–1	Central Valley Fuego	Richmond, VA
19:00 EDT	Bryant 36'; Bolanos (yellow card) 58'; Crisler (yellow card) 75'	Report	Ramos (yellow card) 31'; Schenfeld (yellow card) 43'; Bijev (yellow card) 55'; Crisler 69' (o.g.); S. Chavez (yellow card) 74' (yellow-red card) 80'	Stadium: City Stadium; Referee: Joshua Encarnación

October 2 28	Tormenta	1–1	Richmond Kickers	Statesboro, GA
19:00 EDT	Adeniyi 41', (yellow card) 67'; Otieno (yellow card) 62'	Report	Terzaghi (yellow card) 45+1'; Aune 90+1'; Barnathan (yellow card) 90+2'	Stadium: Optim Health System Field; Referee: Alefo Calume

October 8 29	Forward Madison	0–1	Richmond Kickers	Madison, WI
19:00 EDT		Report	Gordon 35'; Fitch (yellow card) 87'	Stadium: Breese Stevens Field; Attendance: 4,492; Referee: Luis Arroyo

October 15 30	Richmond Kickers	1–1	Greenville Triumph	Richmond, VA
19:00 EDT	Terzaghi 21'; Pavone (yellow card) 79'	Report	Coutinho (yellow card) 19'; Cox-Ashwood 87'	Stadium: City Stadium; Attendance: 6,000; Referee: Mathew Corrigan

=== USL1 Playoffs ===
October 29 Semi Finals	Richmond Kickers	0–1	Chattanooga Red Wolves	Richmond, VA
18:00 EDT	Fitch (yellow card) 33'; Crisler (yellow card) 36'; Morán (yellow card) 38'	Report	Villalobos (yellow card) 17'; Mehl (yellow card) 22'; Texeira (red card) 39'; Mentzingen 86', (yellow card) 87'	Stadium: City Stadium; Attendance: 5,526; Referee: Brad Jensen

=== U.S. Open Cup ===
April 6 Second round	Northern Virginia FC (USL2)	0–1	(Virginia) Richmond Kickers (USL1)	Leesburg, VA
20:00 EDT	Laghjibi (yellow card) 40'; Campbell (yellow card) 45'	Report	Olsen 34'; Terzaghi (yellow card) 80'	Stadium: Virginia Revolution Sportsplex; Attendance: 575; Referee: Nicholas Karnovsky

April 20 Third round	Richmond Kickers (USL1) (Virginia)	1–0 (a.e.t.)	North Carolina Fusion U23 (USL2)	Richmond, VA
18:30 EDT	Aune (yellow card) 24'; Olsen (yellow card) 37'; Candela (yellow card) 44'; Morán (yellow card) 48'; Bryant (yellow card) 67'; Terzaghi 118'	Report	Marriott (yellow card) 5'; Almubaslat (yellow card) 58'; DiLuzio (yellow card) 116'; João Silva (yellow card) 118'; Campo (red card) 120+1'; Tonon (yellow card) 120+3'	Stadium: City Stadium; Attendance: 1,219; Referee: Danielle Chesky

May 11 Fourth round	Richmond Kickers (USL1) (Virginia)	1–5	(North Carolina) Charlotte FC (MLS)	Richmond, VA
18:30 EDT	Morán 53'	Report	Sobociński (yellow card) 4'; Ríos 34'; Reyna 54'; Gaines 58', 61'; Shinyashiki 86'	Stadium: City Stadium; Attendance: 4,621; Referee: Luis Arroyo
