= 2022 USL League One season =

USL League One
- Season: 2022
- Dates: April 2 – October 15 (regular season); October 22 – November 6 (playoffs)
- Champions: Tormenta FC (1st Title)
- Regular season title: Richmond Kickers (1st Title)
- Matches: 170
- Goals: 461 (2.71 per match)
- Best player: (Argentina) Emiliano Terzaghi Richmond Kickers
- Top goalscorer: (Argentina) Emiliano Terzaghi Richmond Kickers (17 Goals)
- Best goalkeeper: (Ghana) Rashid Nuhu Union Omaha
- Biggest home win: CHT 7–1 CLT (June 22)
- Biggest away win: TRM 0–4 CV (May 21)
- Highest scoring: TRM 5–5 GVL (July 13)
- Longest winning run: 3 games CLT, GVL & RIC
- Longest unbeaten run: 11 games OMA
- Longest winless run: 9 games MAD
- Longest losing run: 5 games MAD
- Highest attendance: 6,000; RIC 1–1 GVL (October 15)
- Lowest attendance: 195; NCO 2–1 CHT (June 30)
- Total attendance: 359,107
- Average attendance: 2,203
- All statistics correct as of October 15, 2022 (regular season only).

The 2022 USL League One season was the fourth season of USL League One. The regular season began on April 2 and ended on October 15. The playoffs began on October 22 and ended on November 6.

Eleven teams participated in the 2022 season, one fewer than the previous season. Four reserve teams operated by clubs in Major League Soccer that participated in the previous season (Fort Lauderdale CF, New England Revolution II, North Texas SC and Toronto FC II) began play in MLS's new developmental league, MLS Next Pro. They were replaced by expansion franchises Central Valley Fuego FC and Northern Colorado Hailstorm FC, and by Charlotte Independence, who decided to move from USL Championship to USL League One. At the conclusion of the season, FC Tucson announced they were leaving League One and returning to USL League Two as a result of restructuring of their ownership group.

Richmond Kickers won the regular season title, but were defeated by Chattanooga Red Wolves in the playoff semifinal. Tormenta FC then defeated Chattanooga in the 2022 final, winning their first championship.

== Teams ==
Locations of teams for the 2022 USL League One season

Club	City	Stadium	Capacity	Head coach	Jersey manufacturer	Jersey sponsor
Central Valley Fuego FC	Fresno, California	Fresno State Soccer Stadium	1,000	Martín Vásquez	Capelli Sport	El Mexicano
Charlotte Independence	Charlotte, North Carolina	American Legion Memorial Stadium	10,500	Mike Jeffries	Adidas	Novant Health
Chattanooga Red Wolves SC	Chattanooga, Tennessee	CHI Memorial Stadium	5,000	Jimmy Obleda	Adidas	Transcard
Forward Madison FC	Madison, Wisconsin	Breese Stevens Field	5,000	Matt Glaeser	Hummel	Dairyland Insurance
Greenville Triumph SC	Greenville, South Carolina	Legacy Early College Field	4,000	John Harkes	Hummel	Scansource
North Carolina FC	Cary, North Carolina	WakeMed Soccer Park	10,000	John Bradford	Adidas	WakeMed
Northern Colorado Hailstorm FC	Windsor, Colorado	TicketSmarter Stadium at Future Legends Complex	3,500	Éamon Zayed	Puma	New Belgium Brewing Company
Richmond Kickers	Richmond, Virginia	City Stadium	22,611	Darren Sawatzky	Adidas	Ukrop's
South Georgia Tormenta FC	Statesboro, Georgia	Optim Sports Medicine Field	5,300	Ian Cameron	Adidas	Optim Healthcare
FC Tucson	Tucson, Arizona	Kino Sports Complex	3,500	Jon Pearlman	Puma	Quik Mart
Union Omaha	Papillion, Nebraska	Werner Park	9,023	Jay Mims	Nike	XCancer

=== Managerial changes ===
Team	Outgoing manager	Manner of departure	Date of vacancy	Incoming manager	Date of appointment
Forward Madison FC	(England) Carl Craig	Sacked	November 4, 2021	(United States) Matt Glaeser	December 3, 2021
Central Valley Fuego FC	(United States) Jaime Ramirez	Resigned	February 2022	(United States) Milton Blanco (interim)	February 2022
Central Valley Fuego FC	(United States) Milton Blanco (interim)	End of interim period	April 14, 2022	(Mexico) Martín Vásquez	April 14, 2022

== League table ==
Pos	Team	Pld	W	L	T	GF	GA	GD	Pts	Qualification
1	Richmond Kickers (X)	30	14	7	9	54	35	+19	51	Qualification for the semi-finals
2	Greenville Triumph SC	30	12	8	10	40	38	+2	46	Qualification for the semi-finals
3	Tormenta FC (C)	30	12	9	9	42	40	+2	45	Qualification for the play-offs
4	Chattanooga Red Wolves SC	30	12	11	7	52	39	+13	43	Qualification for the play-offs
5	Union Omaha	30	10	7	13	34	33	+1	43	Qualification for the play-offs
6	Charlotte Independence	30	12	12	6	48	48	0	42	Qualification for the play-offs
7	Northern Colorado Hailstorm FC	30	11	10	9	42	38	+4	42	
8	Central Valley Fuego FC	30	11	12	7	37	40	−3	40	
9	Forward Madison FC	30	7	11	12	34	44	−10	33	
10	FC Tucson	30	8	14	8	34	44	−10	32	
11	North Carolina FC	30	8	16	6	35	53	−18	30	

Source: USL League One
Rules for classification: 1) points; 2) total wins; 3) total goal differential; 4) total goals scored; 5) points earned against top four Conference finishers; 6) disciplinary points; 7) drawing of lots.
(C) Champions; (X) Regular Season Champion

== Results table ==
Color key: Home • Away • Win • Loss • Draw
Club	Matches																													
Club	1	2	3	4	5	6	7	8	9	10	11	12	13	14	15	16	17	18	19	20	21	22	23	24	25	26	27	28	29	30
Charlotte Independence (CLT)	CV	NCO	RIC	OMA	TRM	TUC	NCO	MAD	GVL	RIC	NCA	CHA	MAD	OMA	RIC	NCO	TUC	CV	MAD	TRM	OMA	CHA	TRM	TUC	GVL	CV	NCA	CHA	GVL	NCA
Charlotte Independence (CLT)	3–3	2–1	1–2	2–1	0–0	2–1	1–2	2–1	0–2	0–4	0–2	1–7	6–2	0–0	1–1	1–3	3–2	4–0	0–0	3–0	1–2	2–2	0–2	0–1	2–1	3–0	2–1	1–3	0–1	5–1
Chattanooga Red Wolves (CHA)	MAD	NCA	RIC	TUC	GVL	NCO	CV	GVL	RIC	OMA	CV	CLT	TUC	NCO	TRM	NCA	NCO	OMA	CV	GVL	MAD	TRM	CLT	OMA	MAD	RIC	TUC	CLT	NCA	TRM
Chattanooga Red Wolves (CHA)	1–1	3–1	1–0	2–3	0–1	4–1	2–2	0–1	0–3	0–1	2–0	7–1	1–2	1–2	1–2	2–1	0–0	1–1	1–0	5–1	1–1	2–1	2–2	1–2	5–2	2–2	1–2	3–1	1–0	0–2
Forward Madison FC (MAD)	CHA	OMA	TUC	CV	RIC	GVL	CLT	CV	TUC	GVL	TRM	RIC	CLT	NCO	TRM	OMA	NCO	CLT	NCA	CHA	NCO	NCA	OMA	GVL	CHA	NCA	CV	TRM	RIC	TUC
Forward Madison FC (MAD)	1–1	2–2	1–1	0–1	1–0	0–2	1–2	1–1	2–1	3–2	2–2	2–1	2–6	2–1	2–0	0–0	1–1	0–0	1–2	1–1	3–1	0–0	0–1	2–2	2–5	1–2	0–3	0–1	0–1	1–1
CV Fuego FC (CV)	GVL	CLT	OMA	MAD	GVL	CHA	TRM	MAD	CHA	TUC	NCO	NCA	TRM	GVL	NCO	RIC	CLT	CHA	OMA	NCA	RIC	TRM	TUC	CLT	MAD	RIC	NCA	NCO	TUC	OMA
CV Fuego FC (CV)	2–0	3–3	0–3	1–0	1–1	2–2	4–0	1–1	0–2	0–0	1–4	3–2	0–1	0–1	1–0	3–1	0–4	0–1	0–1	1–0	2–2	0–2	3–2	0–3	3–0	1–1	1–2	0–1	2–0	2–0
Greenville Triumph SC (GVL)	CV	NCA	TRM	CHA	CV	MAD	NCA	CHA	CLT	MAD	OMA	NCO	NCA	TUC	CV	TRM	RIC	OMA	TRM	CHA	RIC	TUC	NCO	MAD	CLT	OMA	NCO	TUC	CLT	RIC
Greenville Triumph SC (GVL)	0–2	1–1	0–2	1–0	1–1	2–0	0–1	1–0	2–0	2–3	2–0	2–1	3–1	1–1	1–0	5–5	3–1	0–0	1–3	1–5	1–0	1–0	0–2	2–2	1–2	1–1	1–1	2–2	1–0	1–1
NoCo Hailstorm FC (NCO)	RIC	CLT	NCA	CHA	CLT	OMA	NCA	TRM	RIC	CV	GVL	CHA	MAD	TUC	CV	CLT	CHA	MAD	RIC	TRM	OMA	TUC	MAD	GVL	NCA	TRM	OMA	GVL	CV	TUC
NoCo Hailstorm FC (NCO)	1–1	1–2	2–1	1–4	2–1	0–0	1–1	1–1	2–3	4–1	1–2	2–1	1–2	1–1	0–1	3–1	0–0	1–1	0–1	2–0	1–1	1–2	1–3	2–0	4–1	1–3	2–1	1–1	1–0	2–1
North Carolina FC (NCA)	TRM	CHA	GVL	NCO	TUC	TRM	GVL	RIC	NCO	CLT	CV	GVL	RIC	OMA	CHA	TRM	RIC	MAD	CV	OMA	MAD	TUC	NCO	MAD	TUC	CLT	CV	OMA	CHA	CLT
North Carolina FC (NCA)	1–0	1–3	1–1	1–2	2–1	2–3	1–0	2–1	1–1	2–0	2–3	1–3	1–4	1–1	1–2	1–2	2–3	2–1	0–1	1–4	0–0	1–1	1–4	2–1	0–1	1–2	2–1	1–1	0–1	1–5
Richmond Kickers (RIC)	TUC	NCO	CHA	CLT	MAD	OMA	NCA	CHA	TRM	CLT	NCO	MAD	TUC	NCA	CLT	GVL	CV	NCA	NCO	TUC	GVL	CV	OMA	TRM	OMA	CHA	CV	TRM	MAD	GVL
Richmond Kickers (RIC)	4–0	1–1	0–1	2–1	0–1	1–1	1–2	3–0	2–2	4–0	3–2	1–2	1–0	4–1	1–1	1–3	1–3	3–2	1–0	3–1	0–1	2–2	3–0	3–1	3–2	2–2	1–1	1–1	1–0	1–1
Tormenta FC (TRM)	NCA	OMA	GVL	TUC	CLT	NCA	CV	TUC	RIC	NCO	MAD	OMA	CV	CHA	GVL	MAD	NCA	GVL	NCO	CLT	CHA	CV	CLT	RIC	NCO	TUC	MAD	RIC	OMA	CHA
Tormenta FC (TRM)	0–1	0–0	2–0	2–0	0–0	3–2	0–4	0–1	2–2	1–1	2–2	2–3	1–0	2–1	5–5	0–2	2–1	3–1	0–2	0–3	1–2	2–0	2–0	1–3	3–1	1–1	1–0	1–1	1–1	2–0
FC Tucson (TUC)	RIC	MAD	CHA	TRM	NCA	CLT	TRM	MAD	OMA	CV	CHA	RIC	GVL	NCO	OMA	CLT	RIC	NCO	GVL	NCA	CV	NCA	OMA	TRM	NCA	CHA	GVL	CV	NCO	MAD
FC Tucson (TUC)	0–4	1–1	3–2	0–2	1–2	1–2	1–0	1–2	1–2	0–0	2–1	0–1	1–1	1–1	1–2	2–3	1–3	2–1	0–1	1–1	2–3	1–0	3–0	1–1	1–0	2–1	2–2	0–2	1–2	1–1
Union Omaha (OMA)	MAD	TRM	CV	CLT	RIC	NCO	CHA	TUC	GVL	TRM	CLT	NCA	TUC	GVL	MAD	CHA	CV	NCO	CLT	NCA	RIC	MAD	CHA	TUC	RIC	GVL	NCO	NCA	TRM	CV
Union Omaha (OMA)	2–2	0–0	3–0	1–2	1–1	0–0	1–0	2–1	0–2	3–2	0–0	1–1	2–1	0–0	0–0	1–1	1–0	1–1	2–1	4–1	0–3	1–0	2–1	0–3	2–3	1–1	1–2	1–1	1–1	0–2

== Playoffs ==
The 2022 USL League One Playoffs (branded as the 2022 USL League One Playoffs presented by Hisense USA for sponsorship reasons) will be the post-season championship of the USL League One season.

=== Bracket ===
Quarter-finals
4	Chattanooga Red Wolves SC (a.e.t.)	1
5	Union Omaha	0
3	Tormenta FC	2
6	Charlotte Independence	1

Semi-finals
1	Richmond Kickers	0
4	Chattanooga Red Wolves SC	1
2	Greenville Triumph SC	0
3	Tormenta FC	1

Final
3	Tormenta FC	2
4	Chattanooga Red Wolves SC	1

=== Schedule ===
==== Quarter-finals ====
October 22, 2022	Tormenta FC	2–1	Charlotte Independence	Statesboro, Georgia
7:00 PM EDT	Sterling 48', 77' (pen.)	Report	Obertan 8'; Hegardt (yellow card) 40'; Acosta (red card) 49'; Pack (yellow card) 53'; Ibarra (yellow card) 75'; Zendejas (yellow card) 81'; Santos (yellow card) 82'; Ciss (yellow card) 82'; Shevtsov (yellow card) 90+3'	Stadium: Optim Sports Medicine Field; Attendance: 1,268; Referee: Ricardo Fierro

October 22, 2022	Chattanooga Red Wolves SC	1–0 (a.e.t.)	Union Omaha	East Ridge, Tennessee
7:30 PM EDT	Texeira (yellow card) 49'; Ortiz (yellow card) 57'; Benton (yellow card) 93'; Mentzingen 101'; Gutiérrez (yellow card) 120+4'	Report	Gil (yellow card) 10'; Scearce (yellow card) 78'; Claudio (yellow card) 113'	Stadium: CHI Memorial Stadium; Attendance: 2,416; Referee: Matthew Corrigan

==== Semi-finals ====
October 29, 2022	Richmond Kickers	0–1	Chattanooga Red Wolves SC	Richmond, Virginia
6:00 PM EDT	Fitch (yellow card) 33'; Crisler (yellow card) 36'; Correa (yellow card) 38'	Report	Villalobos (yellow card) 17'; Mehl (yellow card) 22'; Texeira (red card) 39'; Mentzingen 86' (yellow card) 87'	Stadium: City Stadium; Attendance: 5,526; Referee: Brad Jensen

October 29, 2022	Greenville Triumph SC	0–1	Tormenta FC	Greenville, South Carolina
7:30 PM EDT		Report	Sterling 42'	Stadium: Legacy Early College Field; Attendance: 2,070; Referee: John Griggs

==== USL League One Final ====
November 6, 2022	Tormenta FC	2–1	Chattanooga Red Wolves SC	Statesboro, Georgia
7:30 PM EST	Sterling 35' (pen.); Adjei (yellow card) 39'; Thorn (yellow card) 45+1'; Otieno (yellow card) 72'; Roberts 82'	Report	España (yellow card) 13'; Espinoza (yellow card) 33'; Ortiz (yellow card) 34'; Tejera 45+3'; Benton (yellow card) 72'; Carrera-García (yellow card) 85'	Stadium: Optim Sports Medicine Field; Attendance: 3,045; Referee: Elvis Osmanovic

Championship Game MVP: (England) Kazaiah Sterling (Tormenta FC)

== Average home attendances ==
Ranked from highest to lowest average attendance.

Team	GP	Total	High	Low	Average
Forward Madison FC	15	58,149	4,759	2,605	3,877
Richmond Kickers	15	53,258	6,000	2,011	3,551
Union Omaha	15	50,381	5,167	2,236	3,359
Greenville Triumph SC	15	38,139	4,823	1,832	2,543
Chattanooga Red Wolves SC	15	35,047	3,096	1,807	2,336
Charlotte Independence	15	34,835	4,107	930	2,322
North Carolina FC	15	28,632	5,092	1,056	1,909
Central Valley Fuego FC	15	20,955	2,752	826	1,397
FC Tucson (Note: Total and average attendance records do not reflect the unreported number for FC Tucson home games on September 11 vs. Union Omaha and October 5 match vs. Central Valley Fuego FC.)	15	16,362	1,688	855	1,259
Tormenta FC	15	15,613	2,000	573	1,041
Northern Colorado Hailstorm FC	15	7,736	1,167	195	516
Total	165	359,107	6,000	195	2,203

Sources: USL, Soccer Stadium Digest, Mike Pendleton

== Regular season statistical leaders ==
As of October 15, 2022

=== Top scorers ===
Rank	Player	Club	Goals
1	(Argentina) Emiliano Terzaghi	Richmond Kickers	17
2	(United States) Garrett McLaughlin	North Carolina FC	14
3	(Colombia) Juan Galindrez	Chattanooga Red Wolves	13
3	(England) Kazaiah Sterling	Tormenta FC	13
5	(United States) Jacob Labovitz	Greenville Triumph SC	12
6	(Jamaica) Khori Bennett	Charlotte Independence	11
6	(Democratic Republic of the Congo) Tresor Mbuyu	Charlotte Independence	11
6	(United States) Irvin Parra	Northern Colorado Hailstorm	11
9	(United States) Christian Chaney	Central Valley Fuego	10
10	(United States) Noe Meza	Union Omaha	9

=== Hat-tricks ===
Player	Club	Against	Result	Date
(Colombia) Juan Galindrez	Chattanooga Red Wolves	Charlotte Independence	7–1 (H)	June 22
(United States) Jacob Labovitz	Greenville Triumph SC	Richmond Kickers	1–3 (A)	July 16
(Jamaica) Khori Bennett	Charlotte Independence	Central Valley Fuego	4–0 (H)	July 29
(United States) Trevor Amann	Northern Colorado Hailstorm	North Carolina FC	4–1 (H)	September 3
(England) Kazaiah Sterling	Tormenta FC	Northern Colorado Hailstorm	3–1 (H)	September 10

Notes

(H) – Home team
(A) – Away team

=== Top assists ===
Rank	Player	Club	Assists
1	(United States) Jonathan Bolanos	Richmond Kickers	11
2	(England) Arthur Rogers	Northern Colorado Hailstorm	9
3	(Mexico) José Carrera-García	Chattanooga Red Wolves	8
4	(United States) Moe Espinoza	Chattanooga Red Wolves	7
4	(United States) Miguel Ibarra	Charlotte Independence	7
4	(France) Louis Perez	FC Tucson	7
7	(Germany) Adrian Billhardt	Tormenta FC	5
7	(United States) Ethan Bryant	Richmond Kickers	5
7	(Brazil) Matheus Cassini	Forward Madison FC	5
7	(Democratic Republic of the Congo) Tresor Mbuyu	Charlotte Independence	5
7	(United States) Irvin Parra	Northern Colorado Hailstorm	5
7	(United States) Cyrus Rad	Forward Madison FC	5
7	(United States) Stuart Ritchie	Richmond Kickers	5
7	(Spain) Nil Vinyals	Richmond Kickers	5

=== Clean sheets ===
Rank	Player	Club	Clean sheets
1	(United States) Paul Christensen	Greenville Triumph SC	10
2	(Ghana) Rashid Nuhu	Union Omaha	9
3	(Israel) Ofek Antman	Central Valley Fuego	7
4	(Japan) Akira Fitzgerald	Richmond Kickers	6
4	(United States) Adrian Zendejas	Charlotte Independence	6
6	(United States) TJ Bush	Tormenta FC	5
6	(Mexico) Carlos Merancio	FC Tucson	5
6	(United States) Johan Peñaranda	Northern Colorado Hailstorm	5
9	(Cuba) Raiko Arozarena	Forward Madison FC	4
9	(Mexico) Carlos Avilez	Chattanooga Red Wolves	4
9	(Chile) Pablo Jara	Tormenta FC	4

== Individual awards ==
Award	Winner	Team	Reason	Ref.
Golden Boot	(Argentina) Emiliano Terzaghi	Richmond Kickers	17 goals in 29 games	
Golden Glove	(Ghana) Rashid Nuhu	Union Omaha	9 shutouts, 0.98 goals against average	
Assist Champion	(United States) Jonathan Bolanos	Richmond Kickers	11 assists	
Goalkeeper of the Year	(Ghana) Rashid Nuhu	Union Omaha	9 shutouts, 0.98 goals against average	
Defender of the Year	(England) Arthur Rogers	Northern Colorado Hailstorm	80 chances (league record); 9 assists	
Young Player of the Year	(United States) Ethan Bryant	Richmond Kickers	5 goals; 3 assists	
Comeback Player of the Year	(Germany) Adrian Billhardt	Tormenta FC	5 goals; 5 assists	
Coach of the Year	(United States) Darren Sawatzky	Richmond Kickers	Won Regular Season title	
Most Valuable Player	(Argentina) Emiliano Terzaghi	Richmond Kickers	17 goals, 3 braces; 3 game-winning goals	
Goal of the Year	(Senegal) Omar Ciss	Charlotte Independence	vs North Carolina FC	
Save of the Year	(United States) Johan Peñaranda	Northern Colorado Hailstorm	vs Charlotte Independence	

== All-league teams ==
First team
Goalkeeper	Defenders	Midfielders	Forwards
(Ghana) Rashid Nuhu (OMA) (Golden Glove and Goalkeeper of the Year)	(United States) Jalen Crisler (RIC) (United States) Evan Lee (GVL) (United States) Daniel Navarro (CHA) (England) Arthur Rogers (NCO) (Defender of the Year)	(United States) Jonathan Bolanos (RIC) (Assist Champion) (Mexico) José Carrera-García (CHA) (Senegal) Omar Ciss (CLT) (Goal of the Year) (United States) John Scearce (OMA)	(United States) Garrett McLaughlin (NCA) (Argentina) Emiliano Terzaghi (RIC) (Golden Boot and MVP)

Second team
Goalkeeper	Defenders	Midfielders	Forwards
(Japan) Akira Fitzgerald (RIC)	(United States) Jake Dengler (TRM) (United States) Brandon Fricke (GVL) (United States) Mikey Maldonado (MAD) (United States) Timmy Mehl (CHA)	(Brazil) Gabriel Cabral (TRM) (United States) Moe Espinoza (CHA) (France) Gabriel Obertan (CLT) (France) Louis Perez (TUC)	(United States) Irvin Parra (NCO) (England) Kazaiah Sterling (TRM)

== Monthly awards ==
Month	Player of the Month			Goal of the Month			Save of the Month		Coach of the Month		References
Month	Player	Club	Position	Player	Club	Position	Player	Club	Coach	Club	References
April	(Democratic Republic of the Congo) Tresor Mbuyu	Charlotte Independence	Forward	(United States) Moe Espinoza	Chattanooga Red Wolves	Midfielder	(United States) Paul Christensen	Greenville Triumph SC	(Scotland) Ian Cameron	Tormenta FC	
May	(Bulgaria) Villyan Bijev	Central Valley Fuego	Forward	(Bulgaria) Villyan Bijev	Central Valley Fuego FC	Forward	(Mexico) Carlos Avilez	Chattanooga Red Wolves	(United States) John Bradford	North Carolina FC	
June	(Colombia) Juan Galindrez	Chattanooga Red Wolves	Forward	(United States) Moe Espinoza	Chattanooga Red Wolves	Midfielder	(Israel) Ofek Antman	Central Valley Fuego	(United States) John Harkes	Greenville Triumph SC	
July	(England) Kazaiah Sterling	Tormenta FC	Forward	(Jamaica) Chavany Willis	Union Omaha	Midfielder	(United States) Johan Peñaranda	Northern Colorado Hailstorm	(Scotland) Ian Cameron	Tormenta FC	
August	(Argentina) Emiliano Terzaghi	Richmond Kickers	Forward	(United States) Kevin Piedrahita	Union Omaha	Goalkeeper	(United States) Kevin Piedrahita	Union Omaha	(United States) Jay Mims	Union Omaha	
September	(United States) Jonathan Bolanos	Richmond Kickers	Midfielder	(Senegal) Omar Ciss	Charlotte Independence	Midfielder	(United States) Kevin Piedrahita	Union Omaha	(United States) Jon Pearlman	FC Tucson	

== Weekly awards ==
Player of the Week
Week	Player	Club	Position	Ref.
1	(Spain) Nil Vinyals	Richmond Kickers	Midfielder	
2	(Bulgaria) Villyan Bijev	Central Valley Fuego	Midfielder	
3	(Democratic Republic of the Congo) Tresor Mbuyu	Charlotte Independence	Midfielder	
4	(France) Louis Perez	FC Tucson	Midfielder	
5	(United States) Miguel Ibarra	Charlotte Independence	Midfielder	
6	(United States) Phil Breno	Forward Madison FC	Goalkeeper	
7	(United States) Aaron Walker	Greenville Triumph SC	Midfielder	
8	(Bulgaria) Villyan Bijev	Central Valley Fuego	Forward	
9	(United States) Garrett McLaughlin	North Carolina FC	Forward	
10	(South Africa) Nazeem Bartman	Forward Madison FC	Forward	
11	(United States) Jonathan Bolanos	Richmond Kickers	Midfielder	
12	(United States) Mikey Maldonado	Forward Madison FC	Midfielder	
13	(Colombia) Juan Galindrez	Chattanooga Red Wolves	Forward	
14	(Chile) Pablo Jara	Tormenta FC	Goalkeeper	
15	(Brazil) Gabriel Cabral	Tormenta FC	Midfielder	
16	(United States) Jacob Labovitz	Greenville Triumph SC	Forward	
17	(Sweden) Victor Falck	Central Valley Fuego	Midfielder	
18	(Jamaica) Khori Bennett	Charlotte Independence	Forward	
19	(Argentina) Emiliano Terzaghi	Richmond Kickers	Forward	
20	(Democratic Republic of the Congo) Tresor Mbuyu	Charlotte Independence	Midfielder	
21	(United States) Noe Meza	Union Omaha	Forward	
22	(United States) Jonathan Bolanos	Richmond Kickers	Midfielder	
23	(United States) Trevor Amann	Northern Colorado Hailstorm	Forward	
24	(England) Kazaiah Sterling	Tormenta FC	Forward	
25	(United States) Adrian Zendejas	Charlotte Independence	Goalkeeper	
26	(United States) Brecc Evans	Northern Colorado Hailstorm	Defender	
27	(Colombia) Nicolas Rincon	North Carolina FC	Forward	
28	(United States) Christian Chaney	Central Valley Fuego	Forward	
29	(France) Gabriel Obertan	Charlotte Independence	Midfielder	

Goal of the Week
Week	Player	Club	Opponent	Position	Ref.
1	(England) Matt Bentley	Richmond Kickers	FC Tucson	Forward	
2	(Bulgaria) Villyan Bijev	Central Valley Fuego	Charlotte Independence	Midfielder	
3	(United States) Moe Espinoza	Chattanooga Red Wolves	Richmond Kickers	Midfielder	
4	(Brazil) Rafael Mentzingen	Chattanooga Red Wolves	FC Tucson	Forward	
5	(United States) Irvin Parra	Northern Colorado Hailstorm	North Carolina FC	Forward	
6	(Mexico) Diego Casillas	Central Valley Fuego	Greenville Triumph SC	Midfielder	
7	(United States) Koa Santos	Charlotte Independence	FC Tucson	Midfielder	
8	(Bulgaria) Villyan Bijev	Central Valley Fuego	Tormenta FC	Forward	
9	(United States) Tyler Allen	FC Tucson	Tormenta FC	Defender	
10	(United States) Joe Brito	Union Omaha	Chattanooga Red Wolves	Defender	
11	(United States) Moe Espinoza	Chattanooga Red Wolves	Central Valley Fuego	Midfielder	
12	(Spain) Nil Vinyals	Richmond Kickers	Northern Colorado Hailstorm	Midfielder	
13	(Chile) Maxi Schenfeld	Central Valley Fuego	North Carolina FC	Defender	
14	(United States) Jonathan Bolanos	Richmond Kickers	FC Tucson	Midfielder	
15	(Mexico) José Carrera-García	Chattanooga Red Wolves	Tormenta FC	Midfielder	
16	(Brazil) Rafael Mentzingen	Chattanooga Red Wolves	North Carolina FC	Midfielder	
17	(Sweden) Victor Falck	Central Valley Fuego	Richmond Kickers	Midfielder	
18	(Jamaica) Chavany Willis	Union Omaha	Chattanooga Red Wolves	Midfielder	
19	(Brazil) Rafael Mentzingen	Chattanooga Red Wolves	Greenville Triumph SC	Midfielder	
20	(Jamaica) Nico Brown	Greenville Triumph SC	Richmond Kickers	Forward	
21	(United States) Kevin Piedrahita	Union Omaha	North Carolina FC	Goalkeeper	
22	(United States) Miguel Ibarra	Charlotte Independence	Chattanooga Red Wolves	Midfielder	
23	(United States) Moe Espinoza	Chattanooga Red Wolves	Union Omaha	Midfielder	
24	(United States) Tarn Weir	FC Tucson	Union Omaha	Midfielder	
25	(United States) Mukwelle Akale	Tormenta FC	FC Tucson	Midfielder	
26	(Senegal) Omar Ciss	Charlotte Independence	North Carolina FC	Midfielder	
27	(United States) Moe Espinoza	Chattanooga Red Wolves	Charlotte Independence	Midfielder	
28	(United States) Destan Norman	Northern Colorado Hailstorm	FC Tucson	Midfielder	
29	(United States) Christian Chaney	Central Valley Fuego	Union Omaha	Midfielder	

Save of the Week
Week	Player	Club	Opponent	Ref.
1	(Mexico) Carlos Merancio	FC Tucson	Richmond Kickers	
2	(Japan) Akira Fitzgerald	Richmond Kickers	Northern Colorado Hailstorm	
3	(United States) Phil Breno	Forward Madison FC	FC Tucson	
4	(Ghana) Rashid Nuhu	Union Omaha	Central Valley Fuego	
5	(United States) Paul Christensen	Greenville Triumph SC	Chattanooga Red Wolves	
6	(United States) Phil Breno	Forward Madison FC	Richmond Kickers	
7	(United States) Adrian Zendejas	Charlotte Independence	FC Tucson	
8	(Israel) Ofek Antman	Central Valley Fuego	Tormenta FC	
9	(Mexico) Carlos Avilez	Chattanooga Red Wolves	Greenville Triumph SC	
10	(United States) Noah Abrams	Charlotte Independence	Greenville Triumph SC	
11	(Israel) Ofek Antman	Central Valley Fuego	Chattanooga Red Wolves	
12	(Chile) Pablo Jara	Tormenta FC	Forward Madison FC	
13	(Israel) Ofek Antman	Central Valley Fuego	Northern Colorado Hailstorm	
14	(United States) Thomas Olsen	Northern Colorado Hailstorm	Chattanooga Red Wolves	
15	(Ghana) Rashid Nuhu	Union Omaha	North Carolina FC	
16	(United States) Johan Peñaranda	Northern Colorado Hailstorm	Charlotte Independence	
17	(Ghana) Rashid Nuhu	Union Omaha	Greenville Triumph SC	
18	(United States) Johan Peñaranda	Northern Colorado Hailstorm	Forward Madison FC	
19	(Israel) Ofek Antman	Central Valley Fuego	Chattanooga Red Wolves	
20	(Mexico) Carlos Avilez	Chattanooga Red Wolves	Forward Madison FC	
21	(United States) Kevin Piedrahita	Union Omaha	North Carolina FC	
22	(United States) Johan Peñaranda	Northern Colorado Hailstorm	Greenville Triumph SC	
23	(United States) TJ Bush	Tormenta FC	Charlotte Independence	
24	(Mexico) Carlos Avilez	Chattanooga Red Wolves	Forward Madison FC	
25	(United States) TJ Bush	Tormenta FC	FC Tucson	
26	(United States) Kevin Piedrahita	Union Omaha	Northern Colorado Hailstorm	
27	(Israel) Ofek Antman	Central Valley Fuego	North Carolina FC	
28	(United States) Thomas Olsen	Northern Colorado Hailstorm	FC Tucson	
29	(United States) Adrian Zendejas	Charlotte Independence	North Carolina FC	

Team of the Week
Week	Goalkeeper	Defenders	Midfielders	Forwards	Ref.
**1**	(Japan) Fitzgerald (RIC)	(United States) Dengler (TRM) (Australia) Osmond (MAD) (United States) Payne (RIC) (England) Skelton (NCA)	(Colombia) Bedoya (TUC) (Sweden) Falck (CV) (United States) Villalobos (CHA) (Spain) **Vinyals** (RIC)	(United States) Chaney (CV) (Argentina) Terzaghi (RIC)	
**2**	(Japan) Fitzgerald (RIC)	(United States) Crisler (RIC) (Togo) Dutey (CLT) (Argentina) Lombardi (CHA) (Haiti) Ulysse (NCO)	(Bulgaria) **Bijev** (CV) (United States) Jepson (MAD) (Democratic Republic of the Congo) Mbuyu (CLT) (United States) Vanacore-Decker (NCO)	(United States) Parra (NCO) (Argentina) Terzaghi (RIC)	
**3**	(Ghana) Nuhu (OMA)	(United States) Benton (CHA) (Austria) Crull (TUC) (United States) Santos (CLT) (United States) Weir (TUC)	(United States) M. Ibarra (CLT) (Democratic Republic of the Congo) **Mbuyu** (CLT) (Brazil) Mentzingen (CHA) (United States) Wheeler-Omiunu (MAD)	(United States) McLaughlin (NCA) (United States) Parra (NCO)	
**4**	(Ghana) Nuhu (OMA)	(Austria) Crull (TUC) (United States) Filerman (GVL) (United States) Knutson (OMA) (Italy) Mastrantonio (TUC)	(United States) Espinoza (CHA) (Brazil) Mentzingen (CHA) (France) **L. Perez** (TUC) (United States) Scearce (OMA)	(South Africa) Bosua (TRM) (Japan) Kametani (OMA)	
**5**	(Japan) Fitzgerald (RIC)	(Togo) Dutey (CLT) (United States) Lee (GVL) (Belize) Nembhard (TRM) (United States) Smith (CV)	(Argentina) Baima (RIC) (United States) **M. Ibarra** (CLT) (United States) Santos (CLT) (United States) Walker (GVL)	(United States) Meza (OMA) (United States) Parra (NCO)	
**6**	(United States) **Breno** (MAD)	(Argentina) Lombardi (CHA) (Belize) Nembhard (TRM) (Australia) Osmond (MAD) (United States) Young (NCA)	(Mexico) Carrera-García (CHA) (United States) Espinoza (CHA) (Puerto Rico) Servania (NCA) (Spain) Vinyals (RIC)	(Saint Vincent and the Grenadines) Anderson (NCA) (Uruguay) Texeira (CHA)	
**7**	(United States) Christensen (GVL)	(South Sudan) Jiba (OMA) (Argentina) Lombardi (CHA) (United States) Moss (TUC) (United States) Shultz (GVL)	(Germany) Billhardt (TRM) (Sweden) Falck (CV) (United States) Gavilanes (GVL) (United States) **Walker** (GVL)	(Saint Vincent and the Grenadines) Anderson (NCA) (Democratic Republic of the Congo) Mbuyu (CLT)	
**8**	(Israel) Antman (CV)	(United States) Chavez (CV) (Republic of Ireland) Cornwall (NCO) (United States) Rad (MAD) (England) Skelton (NCA)	(United States) Arriaga (NCA) (Sweden) Falck (CV) (United States) M. Ibarra (CLT) (Saint Kitts and Nevis) Somersall (NCA)	(Bulgaria) **Bijev** (CV) (Senegal) Dieye (CV)	
**9**	(United States) Christensen (GVL)	(United States) Fricke (GVL) (United States) Young (NCA) (Italy) Mastrantonio (TUC) (Australia) Phelps (TRM)	(United States) Arriaga (NCA) (Brazil) Cabral (TRM) (Jamaica) Smart (GVL) (Saint Kitts and Nevis) Somersall (NCA)	(Bulgaria) Bijev (CV) (United States) **McLaughlin** (NCA)	
**10**	(United States) Christensen (GVL)	(United States) Aune (RIC) (United States) Crisler (RIC) (Australia) Phelps (TRM) (United States) Ritchie (RIC)	(United States) Brito (OMA) (United States) Bryant (RIC) (United States) Maldonado (MAD) (Jamaica) Smart (GVL)	(South Africa) **Bartman** (MAD) (England) Sterling (TRM)	
**11**	(Chile) Jara (TRM)	(Ghana) Bawa (OMA) (Republic of Ireland) Cornwall (NCO) (Italy) Mastrantonio (TUC) (United States) Mehl (CHA)	(Ghana) Adjei (TRM) (United States) **Bolanos** (RIC) (United States) Bryant (RIC) (England) Nortey (NCO)	(England) Bentley (RIC) (Brazil) Cassini (MAD)	
**12**	(United States) Christensen (GVL)	(Republic of Ireland) Cornwall (NCO) (United States) Dengler (TRM) (United States) Filerman (GVL) (United States) Shultz (GVL)	(Germany) Billhardt (TRM) (United States) **Maldonado** (MAD) (United States) Smith (CV) (Spain) Vinyals (RIC)	(United States) Bolanos (RIC) (United States) McLaughlin (NCA)	
**13**	(United States) Christensen (GVL)	(United States) Evans (NCO) (United States) Leonard (MAD) (United States) Mehl (CHA) (England) Rogers (NCO)	(United States) Hernández (NCO) (Brazil) Mentzingen (CHA) (United States) Ortiz (CHA) (United States) Scearce (OMA)	(Colombia) **Galindrez** (CHA) (United States) Parra (NCO)	
**14**	(Chile) **Jara** (TRM)	(United States) Shultz (GVL) (United States) Crisler (RIC) (United States) Evans (NCO) (United States) Lee (GVL)	(Brazil) Cabral (TRM) (Jamaica) Gordon (RIC) (United States) Robles (NCO) (United States) Bolanos (RIC)	(Argentina) Terzaghi (RIC) (Brazil) Coutinho (GVL)	
**15**	(Mexico) Merancio (TUC)	(South Sudan) Jiba (OMA) (United States) Young (NCA) (United States) Rad (MAD) (England) Rogers (NCO)	(Brazil) **Cabral** (TRM) (Jamaica) Evans (GVL) (United States) M. Ibarra (CLT) (United States) Torres (MAD)	(United States) Bolanos (RIC) (England) Roberts (TRM)	
**16**	(Cuba) Arozarena (MAD)	(Austria) Crull (TUC) (United States) Mehl (CHA) (England) Rogers (NCO) (England) Skelton (NCA)	(Germany) Billhardt (TRM) (Brazil) Cassini (MAD) (Jamaica) Evans (GVL) (United States) Gavilanes (GVL)	(United States) **Labovitz** (GVL) (England) Sterling (TRM)	
**17**	(United States) Peñaranda (NCO)	(United States) Evans (NCO) (United States) Fox (TUC) (United States) Mehl (CHA) (England) Touche (OMA)	(Senegal) Ciss (CLT) (Sweden) **Falck** (CV) (United States) Hegardt (CLT) (United States) Toia (TUC)	(Democratic Republic of the Congo) Mbuyu (CLT) (England) Sterling (TRM)	
**18**	(Cuba) Arozarena (MAD)	(Venezuela) Acosta (CLT) (United States) Barnathan (RIC) (Australia) Osmond (MAD) (England) Rogers (NCO)	(Ghana) Adjei (TRM) (United States) Hegardt (CLT) (United States) M. Ibarra (CLT) (Spain) Vinyals (RIC)	(Jamaica) **Bennett** (CLT) (England) Sterling (TRM)	
**19**	(Japan) Fitzgerald (RIC)	(United States) Evans (NCO) (United States) Mehl (CHA) (United States) Ritchie (RIC) (England) Rogers (NCO)	(United States) Espinoza (CHA) (Brazil) Mentzingen (CHA) (United States) Scearce (OMA) (United States) Villalobos (CHA)	(Argentina) **Terzaghi** (RIC) (United States) Vanacore-Decker (RIC)	
**20**	(United States) Christensen (GVL)	(Togo) Dutey (CLT) (United States) Young (NCA) (United States) Rad (MAD) (United States) Smith (CV)	(Jamaica) Brown (GVL) (Trinidad and Tobago) Jones (MAD) (Democratic Republic of the Congo) **Mbuyu** (CLT) (United States) Meza (OMA)	(Jamaica) Bennett (CLT) (United States) Parra (NCO)	
**21**	(United States) Piedrahita (OMA)	(United States) Gebhard (MAD) (South Sudan) Jiba (OMA) (United States) Rad (MAD) (United States) Toia (TUC)	(United States) Doyle (OMA) (France) L. Perez (TUC) (United States) Villalobos (CHA) (United States) Walker (GVL)	(United States) **Meza** (OMA) (Finland) Streng (MAD)	
**22**	(United States) Pulisic (NCA)	(United States) Crisler (RIC) (United States) Damm (NCO) (United States) Dengler (TRM) (England) Rogers (NCO)	(United States) **Bolanos** (RIC) (United States) Espinoza (CHA) (United States) M. Ibarra (CLT) (France) L. Perez (TUC)	(England) Sterling (TRM) (Argentina) Terzaghi (RIC)	
**23**	(Ghana) Nuhu (OMA)	(United States) Acoff (OMA) (Austria) Crull (TUC) (United States) Dengler (TRM) (United States) Knutson (OMA)	(Sweden) Falck (CV) (United States) Gavilanes (GVL) (Kenya) Otieno (TRM) (Argentina) F. Pérez (TUC)	(United States) **Amann** (NCO) (Australia) McLean (NCO)	
**24**	(Mexico) Merancio (TUC)	(Venezuela) Acosta (CLT) (Puerto Rico) Cardona (CHA) (United States) Fox (TUC) (United States) Fricke (GVL)	(Brazil) Cabral (TRM) (United States) Maldonado (MAD) (Kenya) Otieno (TRM) (United States) Scearce (OMA)	(United States) Bolanos (RIC) (England) **Sterling** (TRM)	
**25**	(United States) **Zendejas** (CLT)	(Puerto Rico) Cardona (CHA) (United States) Mehl (CHA) (United States) Payne (RIC) (United States) Ritchie (RIC)	(United States) Espinoza (CHA) (United States) Scearce (OMA) (Spain) Vinyals (RIC) (United States) Walker (GVL)	(Jamaica) Bennett (CLT) (United States) Hertzog (OMA)	
**26**	(Mexico) Merancio (TUC)	(United States) **Evans** (NCO) (United States) Fox (TUC) (United States) Lee (GVL) (Australia) Phelps (TRM)	(Colombia) Bedoya (TUC) (United States) Bryant (RIC) (Senegal) Ciss (CLT) (France) L. Perez (TUC)	(United States) Chaney (CV) (United States) McLaughlin (NCA)	
**27**	(Japan) Fitzgerald (RIC)	(England) Adeniyi (TRM) (United States) Young (NCA) (United States) Mehl (CHA) (England) Skelton (NCA)	(Saint Vincent and the Grenadines) Anderson (NCA) (Mexico) Carrera-García (CHA) (United States) Espinoza (CHA) (Democratic Republic of the Congo) Mbuyu (CLT)	(United States) Chaney (CV) (Colombia) **Rincon** (NCA)	
**28**	(United States) Olsen (NCO)	(Venezuela) Acosta (CLT) (Austria) Crull (TUC) (Italy) Mastrantonio (TUC) (United States) Mehl (CHA)	(Mexico) Carrera-García (CHA) (United States) Doyle (OMA) (United States) Norman (NCO) (United States) Prentice (NCO)	(United States) **Chaney** (CV) (United States) J. Ibarra (GVL)	
**29**	(United States) Zendejas (CLT)	(United States) Dimick (CLT) (Togo) Dutey (CLT) (United States) Lee (GVL) (United States) Rad (MAD)	(Senegal) Dieye (CV) (Democratic Republic of the Congo) Mbuyu (CLT) (France) **Obertan** (CLT) (United States) Scearce (OMA)	(Ghana) Adjei (TRM) (United States) Chaney (CV)	
**Bold** denotes Player of the Week

== See also ==
- USL League One
- 2022 USL Championship season
- 2022 USL League Two season
