= Gabriel Cabral =

Brazilian footballer (born 1997)

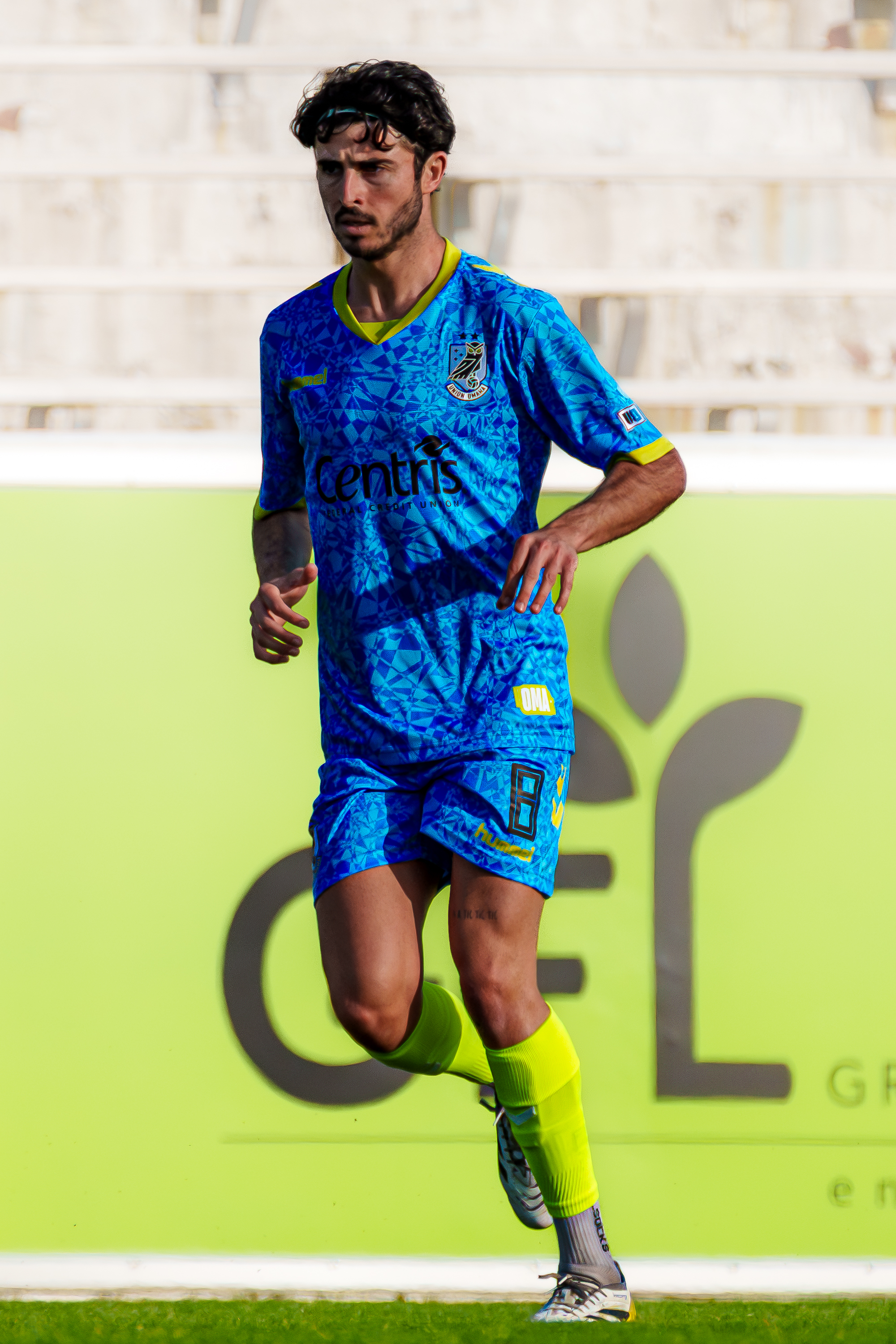
- Cabral with Union Omaha in 2026

Personal information
- Full name: Gabriel Cabral Leal de Freitas
- Date of birth: 29 April 1997 (age 29)
- Place of birth: Petrópolis, Brazil
- Height: 5 ft 11 in (1.80 m)
- Position: Attacking midfielder

Team information
- Current team: Union Omaha
- Number: 8

Youth career
- Fluminense

College career
Years	Team	Apps	(Gls)
2015–2018	Charleston Golden Eagles	68	(12)
2019	UNC Wilmington Seahawks	19	(3)

Senior career*
Years	Team	Apps	(Gls)
2018–2019	The Villages	27	(7)
2021	South Georgia Tormenta FC 2	9	(3)
2022	South Georgia Tormenta	30	(3)
2023–2024	Miami FC	48	(3)
2025	South Georgia Tormenta	29	(1)
2026–	Union Omaha	28	(3)
- * Club domestic league appearances and goals as of October 31, 2025

Gabriel Cabral Leal de Freitas (born 29 April 1997) is a Brazilian footballer who plays as an attacking midfielder for Union Omaha in USL League One.

== Career ==
=== College ===
In 2015, Cabral moved to the United States to play college soccer at the University of Charleston. He redshirted the 2015 season, before going on to play three seasons with the Golden Eagles, making 68 appearances, scoring 12 goals and tallying seven assists. In 2016, Cabral helped the Golden Eagles take home the MEC regular season title, tournament championship, an Atlantic Region title, and ended the season as the 2016 NCAA DII Men's Soccer runner-up. Cabral was named to the MEC All-Freshmen Team for the 2016 season. The following year, the Golden Eagles claimed another MEC regular season title, Atlantic Region Title, and the NCAA DII National Championship, the first in the history of the University. The following year, as a junior the Golden Eagles won the MEC regular season championship and tournament title. In addition, he was named First Team All-MEC, All-Region First Team and earned D2CCA All-American honors.

In 2019, Cabral transferred to the University of North Carolina Wilmington for his senior year, making 19 appearances, scoring three goals and adding three assists to his name for the season. Cabral finished the season as a First-Team All-Colonial Athletic Association and NCCSIA All-State selection.

While at college, Cabral played in the USL League Two with The Villages SC, making 27 appearances across two seasons.

After graduating from college, Cabral returned to the University of Charleston to become an assistant coach for the men's soccer team.

Cabral again played in the USL League Two, joining South Georgia Tormenta 2 for the 2021 season and helping the side to the playoffs and earning himself a spot on the League Two Team of the Year.

=== Professional ===
On 14 December 2021, it was announced Cabral had signed a two-year deal with Tormenta's USL League One team ahead of their 2022 season. He made his professional debut on 2 April 2022, starting in a 1–0 loss to North Carolina FC. On 11 July 2022, Cabral was named USL League One Player of the Week for Week 15 of the 2022 season after notching a goal and an assist in a 2-1 victory over Chattanooga Red Wolves SC. The season ended in success as a 2–1 final victory over Chattanooga Red Wolves saw Tormenta crowned the 2022 USL League One Champions.

In December 2022, Cabral agreed to join USL Championship club Miami FC ahead of the 2023 season.

== Honours ==
Tormenta

- USL League One Champions: 2022
