= Jonathan Bolanos =

American soccer player (born 1998)

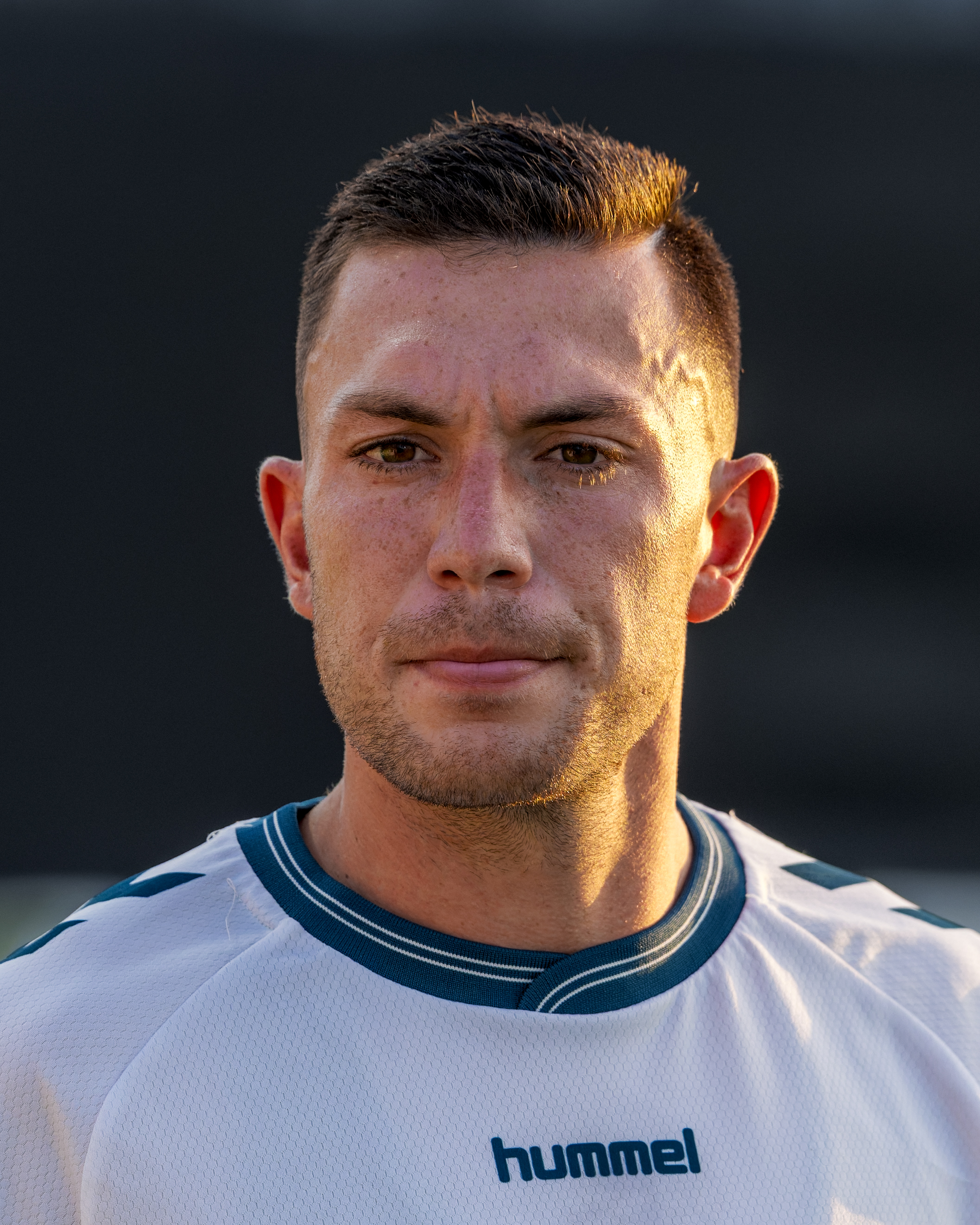
- Bolanos with Sarasota Paradise in 2026

Personal information
- Date of birth: May 20, 1998 (age 28)
- Place of birth: Miramar, Florida, U.S.
- Height: 1.78 m (5 ft 10 in)
- Position: Midfielder

Youth career
- –2016: Kendall SC

College career
Years	Team	Apps	(Gls)
2016–2019	High Point Panthers	74	(15)

Senior career*
Years	Team	Apps	(Gls)
2017	Weston FC	4	(0)
2018–2019	Des Moines Menace	23	(0)
2020–2022	Richmond Kickers	63	(13)
2023–2024	Huntsville City	49	(14)
2025	Westchester SC	27	(3)
2026	Sarasota Paradise	32	(9)
- * Club domestic league appearances and goals as of 00:42, October 27, 2026 (UTC)

Jonathan Bolanos (born May 20, 1998) is an American professional soccer player who plays as a midfielder. He most recently played for Sarasota Paradise in USL League One.

== Career ==
=== High Point University ===
While playing youth soccer, Bolanos attended an ID Camp in North Carolina, after which he was offered an official visit from High Point University. From 2016 to 2019, Bolanos played for NCAA Division I side High Point, where he was twice named to the All-Big South First Team. Over three seasons, Bolanos appeared in 54 matches, logging 32 starts. He posted thirteen goals, four of which were game winners, and seven assists in his time playing for the Panthers.

=== Richmond Kickers ===
In January 2020, Bolanos signed with the Richmond Kickers of USL League One. He made his league debut for the club on July 25, 2020, coming on as a 63rd-minute substitute for Mutaya Mwape in a 3–2 away defeat to the Greenville Triumph. During the 2020 season, Bolanos scored his first two professional goals in a 2–1 win over Orlando City B in Week 13 of USL League One. That week, he was named to the USL League One Team of the Week.

In the 2021 USL League One season, Bolanos appeared in 28 matches, starting 24 of them at various attacking positions. He posted five goals and one assist. In August 2021, Bolanos scored the game-winning goal in the 46th minute against Greenville Triumph FC.

On June 13, 2022, Bolanos was named USL League One Player of the Week for Week 11 of the 2022 season after notching three assists against the Charlotte Independence. Following a September in which he tallied two goals and two assists, he was named USL League One Player of the Month. He finished the regular season with six goals and 11 assists, the latter of which was a USL League One single-season record. He also received an All-League First Team selection and a nomination for league MVP, finishing second behind teammate Emiliano Terzaghi.

=== Huntsville City FC ===
In February 2023, Bolanos joined MLS Next Pro club Huntsville City FC. He made his competitive debut in the club's inaugural league match, registering an assist in their victory over Crown Legacy on penalty kicks. Later that season, Bolanos scored the club's first ever goal at the renovated Joe W. Davis Stadium. He concluded the season with six goals and five assists, and returned to the team for 2024. In June, Bolanos was named MLS Next Pro Player of the Matchday for Week 13. Upon his departure from the club, Bolanos was Huntsville's all-time leading scorer with 14 goals.

=== Westchester SC ===
In January 2025, Bolanos joined USL League One club Westchester SC ahead of their inaugural season. He scored his first goal for the club on March 29 in a 3–1 victory over Texoma, and was subsequently named to the USL League One Team of the Week.

=== Sarasota Paradise ===
On 28 January 2026, Bolanos signed for Sarasota Paradise in USL League One ahead of their inaugural season.

== Personal life ==
Bolanos was born in South Florida to a Colombian father and an American mother. His knowledge of Spanish and English made him the 'unofficial translator' during his time playing for Richmond.

== Honors ==
Individual

- USL League One MVP Nominee: 2022
- USL League One All-League First Team: 2022
