= Akira Fitzgerald =

Japanese footballer (born 1987)

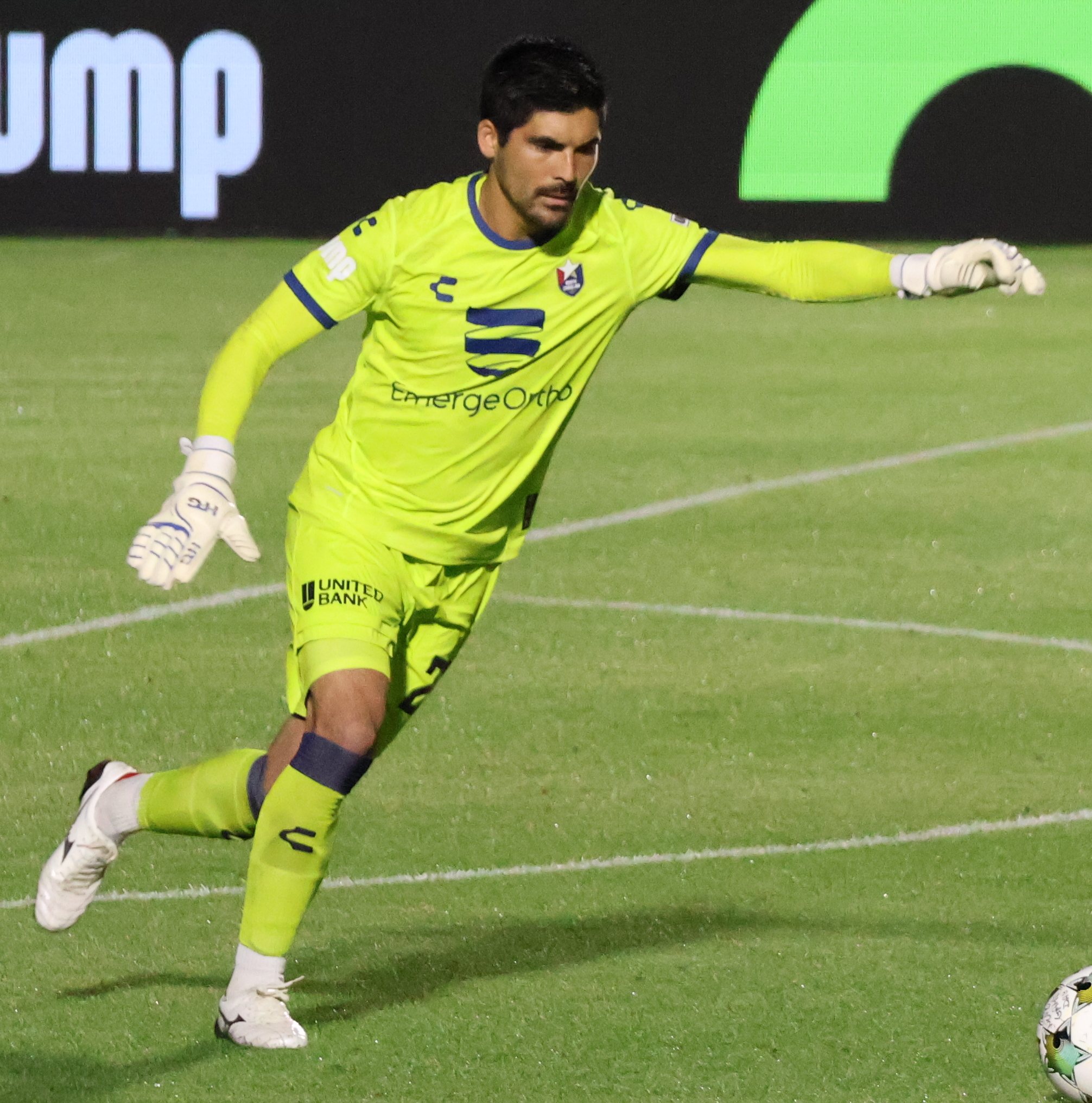
- Fitzgerald with North Carolina FC in 2025

Personal information
- Date of birth: July 17, 1987 (age 39)
- Place of birth: Chiba, Japan
- Height: 1.80 m (5 ft 11 in)
- Position: Goalkeeper

Youth career
- Baltimore Bays

College career
Years	Team	Apps	(Gls)
2007–2010	Wake Forest Demon Deacons	71	(0)

Senior career*
Years	Team	Apps	(Gls)
2008–2009	Cary Clarets	12	(0)
2011–2014	Carolina RailHawks	48	(0)
2015	New York City FC	0	(0)
2015	→ Carolina RailHawks (loan)	3	(0)
2015–2016	Carolina RailHawks	31	(0)
2017–2018	Tampa Bay Rowdies	13	(0)
2019–2023	Richmond Kickers	138	(0)
2024–2025	North Carolina FC	0	(0)

Managerial career
- 2021–2023: Richmond Kickers (goalkeeping)
- * Club domestic league appearances and goals as of December 12, 2025

Akira Fitzgerald (Japanese: フィッツジェラルド・アキラ Fittsujerarudo Akira) (born July 17, 1987) is a Japanese professional footballer who plays as a goalkeeper.

== Career ==
=== College and amateur ===
After redshirting his freshman year at Wake Forest, Fitzgerald made four appearances in 2007 and posted a 1–0–1 record. In 2008, Fitzgerald started every game for the Demon Deacons and finished with 13 clean sheets on the season and was named to ACC Honor Roll. Fitzgerald had another solid year in 2009 as he posted a 17–4–3 record in his junior season and was named to ACC Honor Roll for the second year in a row. Despite a rough senior season in 2010 with an 8–9–2 record, Fitzgerald still finished with a 1.23 goals against average, an ACC-best 81 saves, was named Second Team All-ACC and was one of 30 candidates for the 2010 Lowe's Senior CLASS Award for men's soccer.

During his time in college, Fitzgerald also spent two seasons with USL Premier Development League club Cary Clarets.

=== Professional ===
==== Carolina Railhawks ====
Fitzgerald joined North American Soccer League club Carolina RailHawks in July 2011.

==== New York City FC and Loan to Railhawks ====
After four seasons with the club, his contract ended and he was signed on a free transfer by expansion club New York City FC ahead of the 2014 season.

However, Akira never made an appearance for NYCFC, and on May 19, 2015, it was announced Fitzgerald would be re-joining the RailHawks on loan through the NASL's spring season.

==== Second Permanent Stint with Railhawks ====
Fitzgerald was waived by New York City on 24 June 2015, going on to re-sign with Carolina RailHawks on 2 July 2015.

==== Tampa Bay Rowdies ====
Fitzgerald joined USL side Tampa Bay Rowdies ahead of their inaugural 2017 season in the league, where he would make 13 appearances between 2017 and 2018.

==== Richmond Kickers ====
Fitzgerald joined the Richmond Kickers on 6 February 2019, ahead of the inaugural USL League One season. He has served as the club's primary goalkeeper over subsequent seasons, making 116 appearances through 2022.

Akira received a nomination for USL League One Goalkeeper of the Year in 2019 after ranking second in the league with 9 clean sheets.

Akira was named USL League One Goalkeeper of the Year and given All-League First Team honors in 2021, leading the league with 10 clean sheets, 89 saves and a 72.1% save percentage. Following the season, he re-signed for two years to remain in Richmond through 2023.

In 2022, he led the league in saves, had six clean sheets and was nominated for USL League One Goalkeeper of the Year, and given USL League One All-League Second Team honors.

==== North Carolina FC ====
On December 20, 2023, USL Championship side North Carolina FC announced the signing of Fitzgerald to a two-year contract.

== Honors ==
=== Individual ===
- USL League One All-League First Team: 2021
- USL League One All-League Second Team: 2022
- USL League One Goalkeeper of the Year: 2021
- USL League One Goalkeeper of the Year nominee: 2019, 2022
