= Johan Peñaranda =

American soccer player (born 2000)

Personal information
- Date of birth: January 3, 2000 (age 26)
- Place of birth: Long Beach, New York, United States
- Height: 6 ft 0 in (1.82 m)
- Position: Goalkeeper

Team information
- Current team: Lexington SC
- Number: 99

Youth career
- 2013–2016: BW Gottschee
- 2016–2018: New York City FC

College career
Years	Team	Apps	(Gls)
2018–2019	Pittsburgh Panthers	20	(0)
2020–2021	FIU Panthers	7	(0)

Senior career*
Years	Team	Apps	(Gls)
2021–2022	Santa Ana		
2022–2023	Northern Colorado Hailstorm	20	(0)
2024–2025	FC Tulsa	47	(0)
2026–	Lexington SC	0	(0)

International career^{‡}
2018	United States U19	1	(0)
- * Club domestic league appearances and goals as of 11:29, 9 November 2026 (UTC) ‡ National team caps and goals as of June 17, 2022

Johan Peñaranda (born January 3, 2000) is an American professional soccer player who plays as a goalkeeper for USL Championship club Lexington SC.

== Club career ==
=== Youth and college ===
Peñaranda attended Long Beach High School, also playing club soccer at the BW Gottschee academy for two-and-a-half seasons before joining the New York City FC academy, helping the youth side to a Generation adidas Cup win in 2017 and a USSDA title in 2018.

In 2018, Peñaranda attended the University of Pittsburgh to play college soccer. In two seasons with the Panthers, he made 20 appearances. Following the 2019 season, Peñaranda opted to move to Miami, Florida to be closer to his family. He attended Florida International University and made seven appearances in 2021, following the cancelled 2020 season due to the COVID-19 pandemic.

=== Professional ===
In July 2021, Peñaranda signed his first professional contract with A.D. Municipal Santa Ana in the Segunda División de Costa Rica.

On February 1, 2022, it was announced that Peñaranda had signed with USL League One club Northern Colorado Hailstorm ahead of their inaugural season. He made his debut for the Hailstorm on May 18, 2022, starting in a 2–1 win at Charlotte Independence.

On June 7, 2024, Peñaranda signed with USL Championship side FC Tulsa.

On February 20, 2026 Peñaranda joined USL Championship side Lexington SC via a transfer from FC Tulsa.

== International ==
In 2018, Peñaranda made an appearance for the United States under-19 team in a friendly game against the Jamaica under-20 side.
