= Kevin Piedrahita =

American soccer player

Personal information
- Full name: Kevin Wilson Piedrahita Velasco
- Date of birth: June 18, 1991 (age 35)
- Place of birth: Queens, New York, United States
- Height: 1.85 m (6 ft 1 in)
- Position: Goalkeeper

Youth career
- 2009–2011: América de Cali

Senior career*
Years	Team	Apps	(Gls)
2011–2012	América de Cali	1	(0)
2012–2016	Rionegro Águilas	25	(0)
2017–2019	La Equidad	6	(0)
2020	Leones	2	(0)
2021–2022	Union Omaha	12	(1)

International career
2010	United States U20	1	(0)
- * Club domestic league appearances and goals as of August 20, 2022

Kevin Wilson Piedrahita Velasco (born June 18, 1991) is an American soccer player.

== Club career ==
Piedrahita began his career with Colombian club América de Cali where he made his professional debut on December 8, 2011, in a relegation playoff against Patriotas F.C. The match ended in a 4–3 defeat on penalties which resulted in America being relegated to Categoría Primera B.

On March 5, 2021, Piedrahita signed with USL League One side Union Omaha.

Piedrahita scored for Union Omaha in an August 2022 match against North Carolina FC.

== International career ==
Piedrahita's only international appearance came in the under-20 level on December 17, 2011, when he recorded a clean sheet in USA's 2–0 win over Canada.
