= Jalen Crisler =

American soccer player (born 1994)

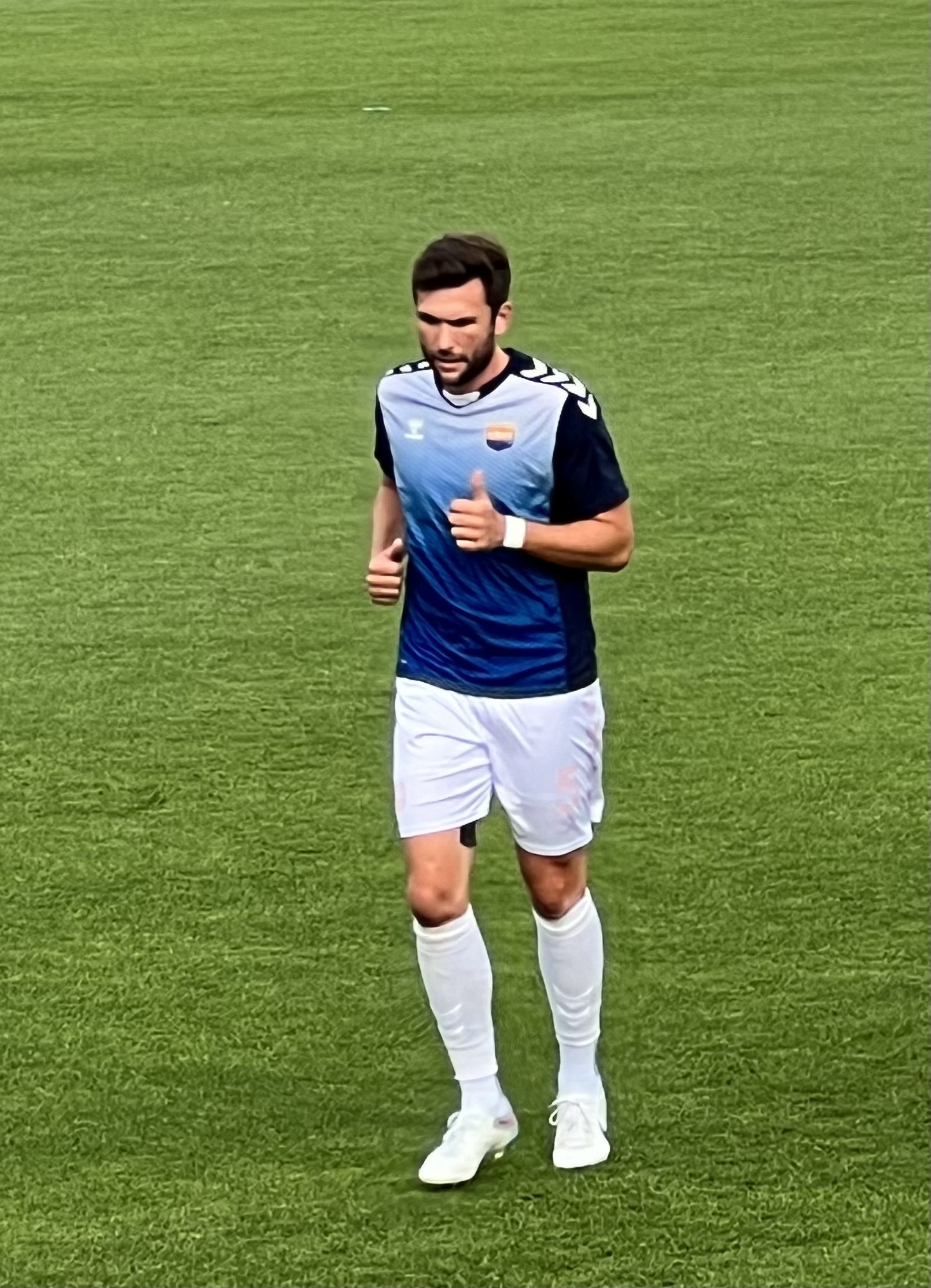
- Crisler with One Knoxville SC in 2023

Personal information
- Date of birth: August 29, 1994 (age 32)
- Place of birth: Everett, Washington, United States
- Height: 6 ft 4 in (1.93 m)
- Position: Defender

College career
| Years | Team | Apps | (Gls) |
| 2013–2017 | Gonzaga Bulldogs | 64 | (6) |

Senior career*
| Years | Team | Apps | (Gls) |
| 2016–2017 | Seattle Sounders FC U-23 | 11 | (1) |
| 2019 | Detroit City | 10 | (1) |
| 2020 | Forward Madison | 2 | (0) |
| 2021–2022 | Richmond Kickers | 57 | (2) |
| 2023–2024 | One Knoxville | 46 | (2) |
| 2025 | Spokane Velocity | 13 | (2) |
- * Club domestic league appearances and goals as of November 1, 2025

Jalen Crisler (born August 29, 1994) is an American professional soccer player who plays as a defender.

== Career ==
=== Youth and college ===
Crisler played college soccer for the Gonzaga Bulldogs. After redshirting his freshman year, Crisler made 64 appearances for the Bulldogs and was First Team All-West Coast Conference in 2016.

During the summers before his junior and senior seasons, Crisler played in the Premier Development League with Seattle Sounders FC U-23.

=== Professional ===
Crisler signed with Detroit City FC for their 2019 NPSL Members Cup season after a trial with Indy Eleven. He made 10 appearances for Detroit City, scoring one goal.

Crisler signed with USL League One club Forward Madison FC before the 2020 season.

On February 18, 2021, Crisler made the move to USL League One side Richmond Kickers. Following a stellar 2022 season, Crisler was nominated for USL League One Defender of the Year.

On December 16, 2022, Crisler signed with One Knoxville SC ahead of the 2023 season. He was released by Knoxville following their 2024 season.

== Honors ==
=== Individual ===
- USL League One All-League First Team: 2022
- USL League One Defender of the Year Nominee: 2022
