= Jacob Labovitz =

American soccer player (born 1998)

Personal information
- Date of birth: September 14, 1998 (age 28)
- Place of birth: Great Falls, Virginia, U.S.
- Height: 6 ft 2 in (1.88 m)
- Position: Forward

Team information
- Current team: Vermont Green

Youth career
- 2013–2015: Loudoun Soccer
- 2016–2017: Annandale United

College career
Years	Team	Apps	(Gls)
2017–2018	Fairleigh Dickinson Knights	30	(9)
2019–2021	Virginia Tech Hokies	51	(23)

Senior career*
Years	Team	Apps	(Gls)
2018	Ocean City Nor'easters	3	(0)
2022–2023	Greenville Triumph	57	(18)
2024–	Vermont Green	26	(13)
- * Club domestic league appearances and goals as of August 17, 2025

Jacob Labovitz (born September 14, 1998) is an American former professional soccer player who currently plays for USL League Two club Vermont Green FC.

== Early life ==
Labovitz attended Langley High School and led the Saxons to a 19–1–2 record and a Group 6A State Championship. Labovitz scored 45 goals across his 22 games, helping the team to Virginia State Championships in 2015 and 2017. Labovitz played club soccer at Loudoun Soccer, where he won two state cup championships in 2013 and 2014.

He returned to the United States in 2016, playing locally with Annandale United, winning a state championship in 2016.

== College career ==
In 2017, Labovitz attended Fairleigh Dickinson University to play college soccer. He played two seasons with the Knights, making 30 appearances, scoring nine goals and tallying five assists. In his freshman season, he was named NEC Rookie of the Year, as well as All-NEC Second Team and All-Rookie Team. In 2019, he transferred to Virginia Tech, playing 51 games for the Hokies and bagging 23 goals and adding nine assists to his name. In his senior season, Labovitz earned All-ACC, VaSID All-State team and Player of the Year honors.

During his 2018 season, Labovitz also appeared in the USL PDL, making three appearances for Ocean City Nor'easters.

== Professional career ==
On February 8, 2022, Labovitz signed his first professional contract with Greenville Triumph of the USL League One. He made his professional debut on April 2, 2022, appearing as a 67th–minute substitute in a 0–2 loss to Central Valley Fuego. On May 28, 2022, Labovitz scored his first professional goal in a 1–0 victory over Chattanooga Red Wolves SC. On July 18, 2022, Labovitz was named USL League One Player of the Week for Week 16 of the 2022 season. Labovitz scored a brace in a 5–5 draw over Tormenta FC and his first professional hat-trick in a 3–1 win over Richmond Kickers to set the record for most goals scored by a single player in one week in USL League One history. Labovitz retired from professional soccer following the 2023 USL League One season.

Labovitz joined USL League Two club Vermont Green in February 2024. He scored in his club debut, a 4–3 win over Lexington SC in the 2024 U.S. Open Cup.

== Personal life ==
Labovitz's great-great-grandfather was born in Hungary, which allowed him to gain a Hungarian passport.

== Honors ==
- USL League Two
  - Champion: 2025
