= Wyndham, Virginia =

- Census-designated place
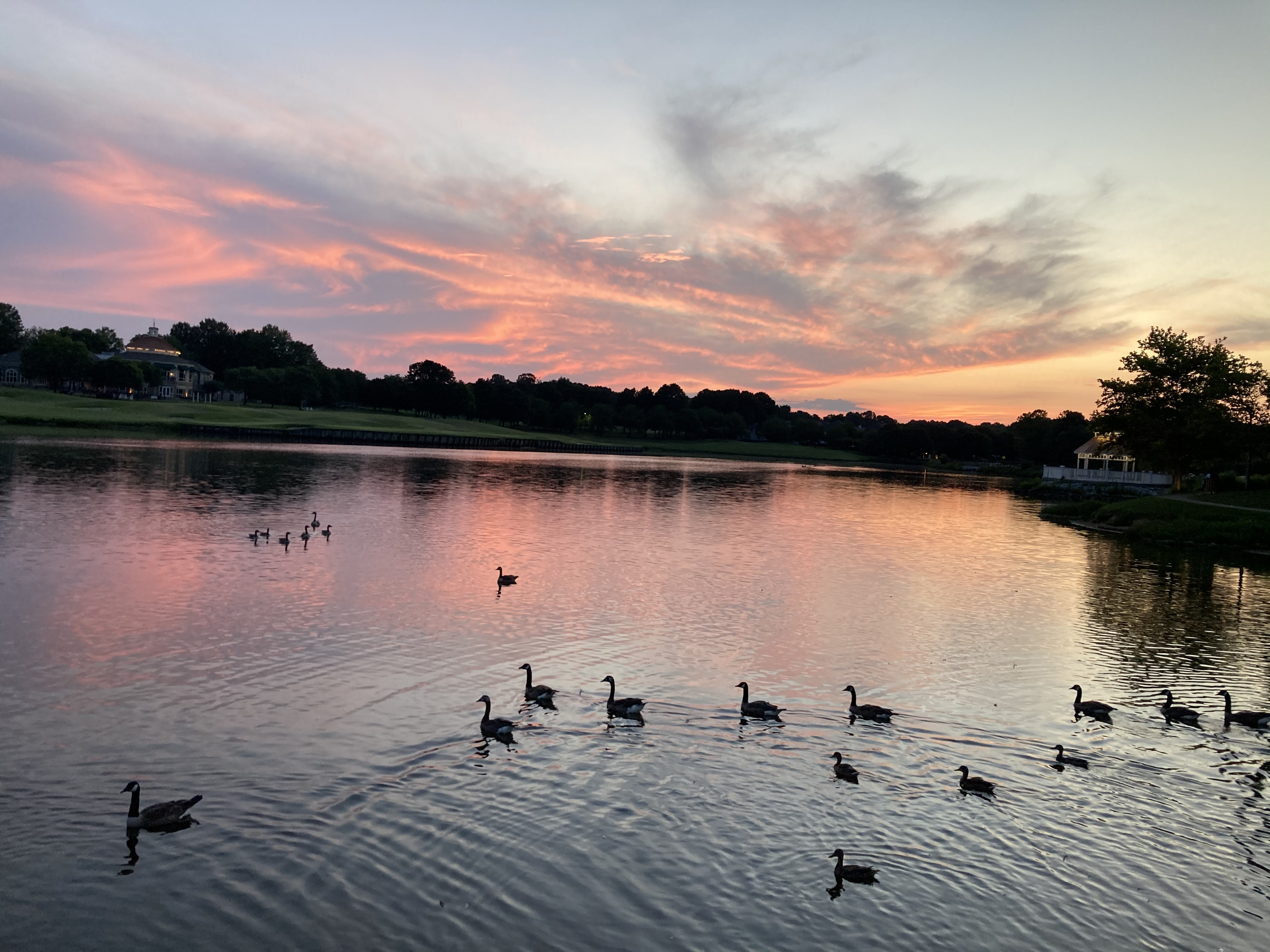
- Wyndham Lake in Wyndham, Virginia

- Location within Virginia Location within the United States
- Coordinates: 37°41′51″N 77°36′39″W
- Country: United States
- State: Virginia
- County: Henrico

Area
  - Total: 3.6 sq mi (9.4 km^{2})
  - Land: 3.6 sq mi (9.4 km^{2})
  - Water: 0 sq mi (0.0 km^{2})
- Elevation: 249 ft (76 m)

Population (2010)
  - Total: 9,785
  - Density: 2,700/sq mi (1,000/km^{2})
- Time zone: UTC−5 (Eastern (EST))
  - Summer (DST): UTC−4 (EDT)
- ZIP code: 23059
- Area code: 804
- FIPS code: 51-87960
- GNIS feature ID: 1852921

Wyndham is a census-designated place (CDP) in Henrico County, Virginia, United States, in the West End area outside of Richmond. As of the 2020 census, Wyndham had a population of 11,087. The CDP is named for Wyndham, a planned community there. It is an affluent suburb of Richmond, Virginia.

== Geography ==
Wyndham is located at 37°41′51″N 77°36′39″W (37.697475, −77.610871).

According to the United States Census Bureau, the CDP has a total area of 3.6 square miles (9.4 km^{2}), all land.

Wyndham, Virginia sign

== Demographics ==
Historical population
Census	Pop.	Note	%±
2000	6,176		—
2020	11,087		—
U.S. Decennial Census; 2000 2010

Wyndham was first listed as a census designated place in the 2000 U.S. census.

=== Racial and ethnic composition ===
Wyndham CDP, Virginia – Racial and ethnic composition Note: the US Census treats Hispanic/Latino as an ethnic category. This table excludes Latinos from the racial categories and assigns them to a separate category. Hispanics/Latinos may be of any race.
Race / Ethnicity (NH = Non-Hispanic)	Pop 2000	Pop 2010	Pop 2020	% 2000	% 2010	% 2020
White alone (NH)	5,585	7,777	7,122	90.43%	79.48%	64.24%
Black or African American alone (NH)	164	290	392	2.66%	2.96%	3.54%
Native American or Alaska Native alone (NH)	5	11	12	0.08%	0.11%	0.11%
Asian alone (NH)	280	1,379	2,705	4.53%	14.09%	24.40%
Native Hawaiian or Pacific Islander alone (NH)	0	0	0	0.00%	0.00%	0.00%
Other race alone (NH)	5	10	80	0.08%	0.10%	0.72%
Mixed race or Multiracial (NH)	50	140	403	0.81%	1.43%	3.63%
Hispanic or Latino (any race)	87	178	373	1.41%	1.82%	3.36%
Total	6,176	9,785	11,087	100.00%	100.00%	100.00%

=== 2020 census ===
As of the 2020 census, Wyndham had a population of 11,087. The median age was 41.1 years. 29.8% of residents were under the age of 18 and 11.6% of residents were 65 years of age or older. For every 100 females there were 93.5 males, and for every 100 females age 18 and over there were 91.4 males age 18 and over.

100.0% of residents lived in urban areas, while 0.0% lived in rural areas.

There were 3,625 households in Wyndham, of which 50.6% had children under the age of 18 living in them. Of all households, 75.9% were married-couple households, 6.8% were households with a male householder and no spouse or partner present, and 14.7% were households with a female householder and no spouse or partner present. About 12.3% of all households were made up of individuals and 6.2% had someone living alone who was 65 years of age or older.

There were 3,705 housing units, of which 2.2% were vacant. The homeowner vacancy rate was 1.0% and the rental vacancy rate was 3.0%.

Racial composition as of the 2020 census
Race	Number	Percent
White	7,221	65.1%
Black or African American	398	3.6%
American Indian and Alaska Native	20	0.2%
Asian	2,705	24.4%
Native Hawaiian and Other Pacific Islander	0	0.0%
Some other race	121	1.1%
Two or more races	622	5.6%

=== 2000 census ===
As of the census of 2000, there were 6,176 people, 2,068 households, and 1,732 families residing in the CDP. The population density was 1,702.0 people per square mile (656.9/km^{2}). There were 2,190 housing units at an average density of 603.5/sq mi (232.9/km^{2}). The racial makeup of the CDP was 91.42% White, 2.66% African American, 0.10% Native American, 4.55% Asian, 0.23% from other races, and 1.05% from two or more races. Hispanic or Latino of any race were 1.41% of the population.

There were 2,068 households, out of which 55.4% had children under the age of 18 living with them, 79.2% were married couples living together, 3.2% had a female householder with no husband present, and 16.2% were non-families. 13.2% of all households were made up of individuals, and 2.0% had someone living alone who was 65 years of age or older. The average household size was 2.99 and the average family size was 3.32.

In the CDP, the population was spread out, with 35.7% under the age of 18, 2.0% from 18 to 24, 39.2% from 25 to 44, 18.7% from 45 to 64, and 4.4% who were 65 years of age or older. The median age was 34 years. For every 100 females, there were 100.0 males. For every 100 females age 18 and over, there were 96.0 males.

The median income for a household in the CDP was $113,723, and the median income for a family was $121,019. Males had a median income of $93,839 versus $44,911 for females. The per capita income for the CDP was $43,195. About 0.8% of families and 0.9% of the population were below the poverty line, including 1.2% of those under age 18 and none of those age 65 or over.
