= Victor Falck =

Swedish footballer (born 1997)

Personal information
- Date of birth: 25 October 1997 (age 29)
- Place of birth: Landvetter, Sweden
- Height: 1.83 m (6 ft 0 in)
- Position: Midfielder

Youth career
- –2012: Örgryte IS
- 2014–2016: Richmond United

College career
Years	Team	Apps	(Gls)
2016	Virginia Cavaliers	3	(0)
2017–2019	UC Irvine Anteaters	59	(4)

Senior career*
Years	Team	Apps	(Gls)
2017	Virginia Beach City FC	6	(0)
2019	Orange County SC U-23	8	(1)
2020–2021	Richmond Kickers	38	(1)
2022–2023	Central Valley Fuego	59	(8)
- * Club domestic league appearances and goals as of 14 October 2023

Victor Falck (born 25 October 1997) is a Swedish professional footballer who plays as a midfielder.

== Career ==
=== College ===
Falck began his collegiate career at the University of Virginia, but transferred to UC Irvine after a freshman year in which he made just three appearances. While in college, Falck played for Orange County SC U-23 in USL League Two.

=== Richmond Kickers ===
In January 2020, Falck signed a professional contract with the Richmond Kickers of USL League One. He made his league debut for the club on 25 July 2020 against the Greenville Triumph. After appearing in all 16 league matches for the club during his rookie year, Falck re-signed with the club ahead of the 2021 season.

=== Central Valley Fuego FC ===
Falck signed with Central Valley Fuego FC in February 2022, ahead of their inaugural USL League One season. On 25 July 2022, Falck was named USL League One Player of the Week for Week 17 of the 2022 season, after scoring a brace and an assist against his old club, Richmond Kickers.
