= Paul Christensen =

American soccer player

Personal information
- Date of birth: April 15, 1996 (age 30)
- Place of birth: Woodinville, Washington, U.S.
- Height: 1.85 m (6 ft 1 in)
- Position: Goalkeeper

Youth career
- 2012–2014: Seattle Sounders FC

College career
Years	Team	Apps	(Gls)
2014–2017	Portland Pilots	72	(0)

Senior career*
Years	Team	Apps	(Gls)
2015–2017	Seattle Sounders FC U-23	21	(0)
2018–2019	Atlanta United 2	10	(0)
2018	→ Atlanta United FC (loan)	1	(0)
2020–2022	Greenville Triumph	40	(0)

Managerial career
- 2020: North Greenville Crusaders (goalkeeping)
- 2021–: Bob Jones Bruins (goalkeeping)
- * Club domestic league appearances and goals as of November 17, 2022

Paul Christensen (born April 15, 1996) is an American former professional soccer player who played as a goalkeeper. He is currently the goalkeeping coach for the Bob Jones University men's soccer team.

== Career ==
=== College ===
Christensen played four years of college soccer at the University of Portland, where he made 72 appearances for the Pilots and kept 20 shutouts. Paul battled now Rs. senior GK and close friend Kienan Weekes in the goal while at Portland for 4 years. The Wall as some know him, otherwise known as El Jefe, was the turning point behind an impressive turnaround for the program.

While at college, Christensen also played with Premier Development League side Seattle Sounders FC U-23.

=== Professional career ===
On January 21, 2018, Christensen was selected 70th overall in 2018 MLS SuperDraft by Atlanta United FC. He signed with their United Soccer League affiliate side Atlanta United 2 on February 18, 2018. He made his professional debut on March 31, 2018, in a 2–2 draw against the Charlotte Independence.

On May 4, 2018, Christensen signed a short-term deal to be included on the roster for Atlanta United FC's senior team after backup goalkeepers Alec Kann and Mitch Hildebrandt were injured. He made his debut on May 9 against Sporting Kansas City, replacing Brad Guzan after he was sent off with a red card.

Christensen announced his retirement on November 17, 2022.
