= Stephen Payne (soccer) =

American soccer player (born 1997)

Personal information
- Full name: Stephen Oyebolaji Payne
- Date of birth: June 16, 1997 (age 29)
- Place of birth: Birmingham, Alabama, United States
- Height: 5 ft 10 in (1.78 m)
- Position: Defender

Youth career
- 2012–2015: Chicago Magic
- 2016–2017: Estoril

College career
Years	Team	Apps	(Gls)
2015	UCLA Bruins	13	(1)

Senior career*
Years	Team	Apps	(Gls)
2017–2018	Varzim B	27	(7)
2018–2019	Varzim	14	(1)
2019	Portimonense	0	(0)
2020	Mafra		
2020–2021	Länk FCV	20	(0)
2022	Richmond Kickers	28	(1)
2023–2024	Forward Madison	54	(3)
2025–2026	Westchester SC	29	(0)
- * Club domestic league appearances and goals as of 31 October 2026

Stephen Oyebolaji Payne (born June 16, 1997) is a former American soccer player who played as a defender.

== Career ==
Born in Birmingham, Alabama, United States, Payne is of Nigerian descent. His father had a scholarship for college soccer at the University of Alabama in Huntsville, while his mother ran track at Alabama A&M University; he is the middle of three children with two sisters also playing soccer, Nigeria women's national team players Toni and Nicole Payne.

Payne played for four years at Lake Forest Academy and one year at UCLA Bruins in 2015 before traveling to Europe for trials. Passed over by several professional clubs in France and Italy, he was taken on by a fourth-division Portuguese club and eventually earned his way into the under-23 team of Estoril.

After a season with their reserve team, Payne made his first team debut for Varzim during the 2018–19 LigaPro season. He played 19 games, and scored the only goal of the match in the 88th minute against Porto B on 23 April 2019.

Payne signed for Portimonense prior to the 2019–20 Primeira Liga season, alongside teammate Jeferson.

On January 20, 2022, Payne returned to the United States by signing with USL League One club Richmond Kickers.

Payne signed with rival USL League One club Forward Madison FC prior to the 2023 season.

Payne joined expansion side Westchester SC on December 23, 2024, ahead of the club's first season in USL League One.

== Career statistics ==
As of 9 January 2019.

Club	Season	League			Cup		Other		Total	
Club	Season	Division	Apps	Goals	Apps	Goals	Apps	Goals	Apps	Goals
Varzim B	2017–18	Elite Série 1 AF Porto	27	7	0	0	0	0	27	7
Varzim	2018–19	LigaPro	14	1	5 (Note: Appearances in the Taça da Liga)	0	0	0	7	0
Portimonense	2019–20	Primeira Liga	0	0	0	0	0	0	0	0
Career total			41	8	5	0	0	0	34	7
