= Ryen Jiba =

South Sudanese footballer (born 2001)

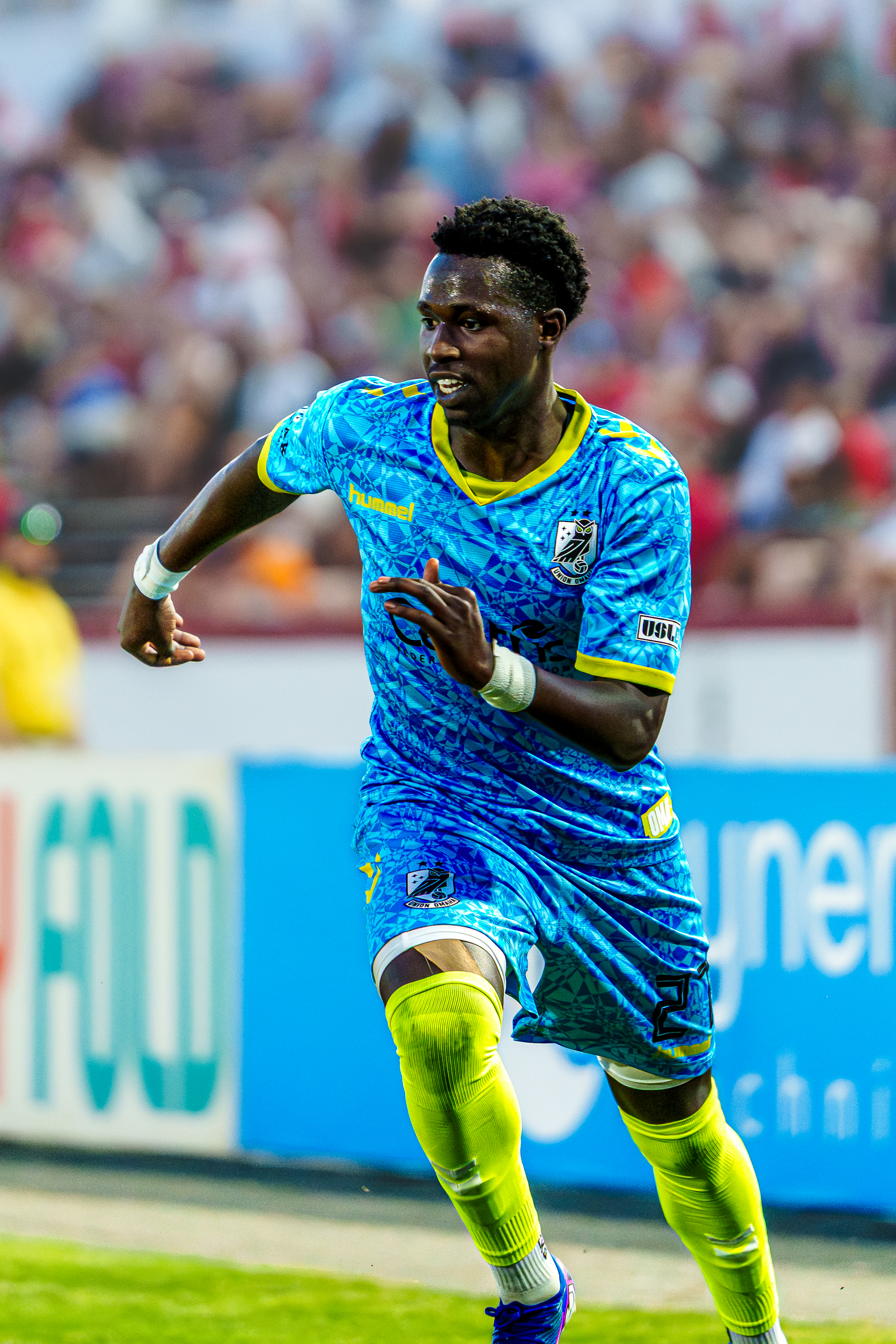
- Jiba with Union Omaha in 2026

Personal information
- Date of birth: April 29, 2001 (age 25)
- Place of birth: South Sudan
- Height: 1.80 m (5 ft 11 in)
- Positions: Full-back; attacking midfielder

Team information
- Current team: Union Omaha
- Number: 27

Youth career
- –2019: Sparta United

College career
Years	Team	Apps	(Gls)
2019–2021	SLCC Bruins	48	(25)

Senior career*
Years	Team	Apps	(Gls)
2021	Park City Red Wolves	1	(1)
2022	Union Omaha	28	(0)
2023	Minnesota United	0	(0)
2024–	Union Omaha	58	(4)
- * Club domestic league appearances and goals as of October 31, 2026

Ryen Jiba (born 29 April 2001) is a South Sudanese professional footballer who plays as an full-back for Union Omaha.

== Career ==
=== Early career ===
Jiba was born in South Sudan, but grew up in Salt Lake City, Utah, attending East High School. He played club soccer with Sparta United, and was the Tosh Athlete of the Year in 2019.

In 2019, Jiba attended Salt Lake Community College to play college soccer. Between 2019 and 2021, Jiba made 48 appearances for the Bruins, scoring 25 goals and tallying 20 assists. Jiba earned regional first team honors three times and was the 2019 NJCAA Region 18 Player of the Year.

In 2021, Jiba also played in the USL League Two with Park City Red Wolves, making a single appearance and scoring a single goal.

=== Professional ===
On 18 February 2022, Jiba signed with USL League One side Union Omaha. He made his professional league debut for Omaha on 9 April 2022, starting in a 2–2 draw with Forward Madison FC.

In December 2022, it was announced Jiba was eligible for selection in the 2023 MLS SuperDraft. On 21 December 2022, Jiba was selected 19th overall by Minnesota United FC. On 12 January 2023, it was announced that Jiba had officially signed with Minnesota United for a USL League One record transfer fee received.

In March 2024, Jiba returned to Union Omaha.
