= Arthur Rogers (footballer) =

English footballer (born 1996)

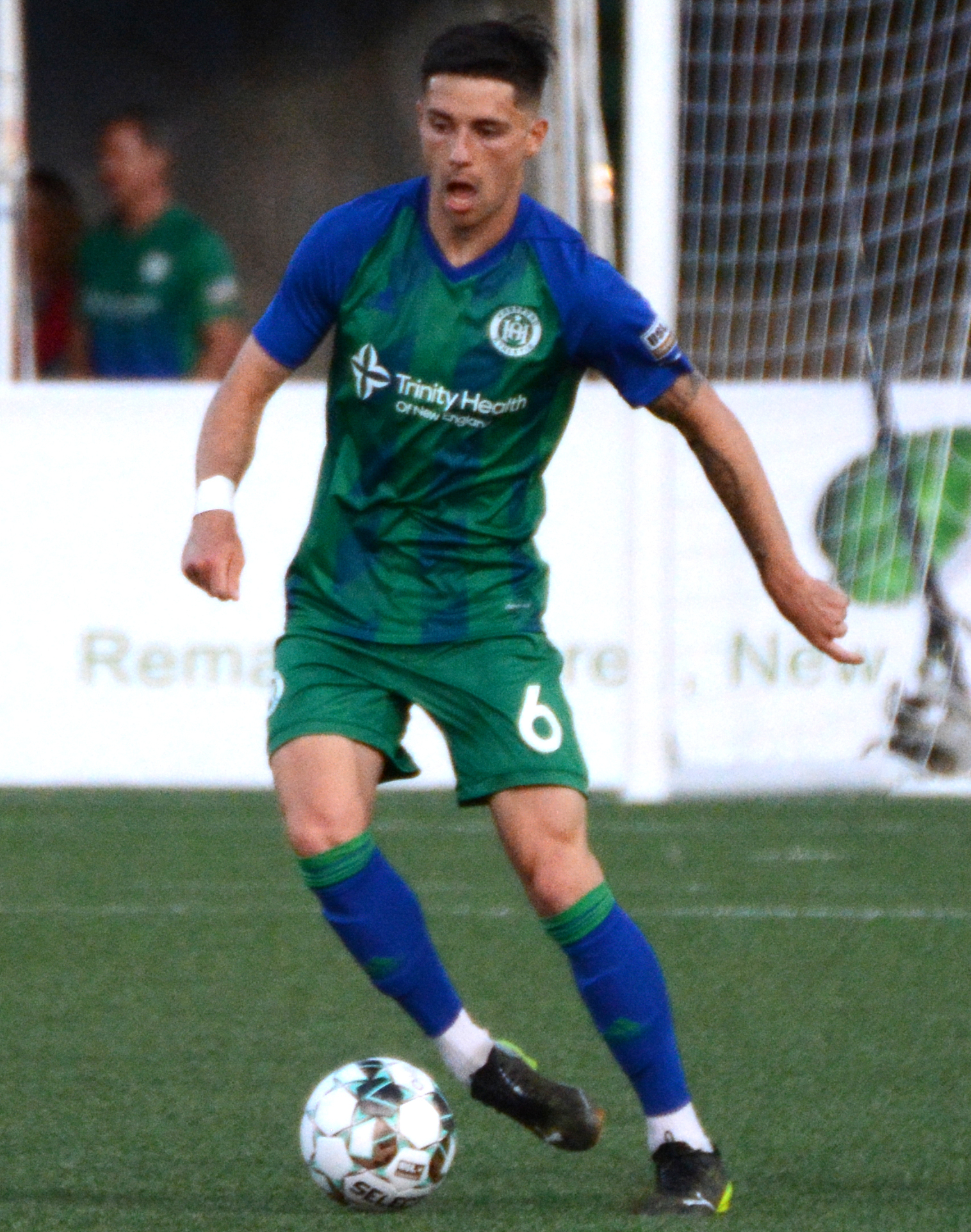
- Rogers with Hartford Athletic in 2021

Personal information
- Date of birth: 26 September 1996 (age 30)
- Place of birth: London, England
- Height: 6 ft 0 in (1.83 m)
- Position: Defender

Team information
- Current team: Miami FC
- Number: 14

Youth career
- Hanwell Town
- Wealdstone

College career
Years	Team	Apps	(Gls)
2016	Kentucky Wesleyan Panthers	17	(7)
2017–2019	UTRGV Vaqueros	45	(3)

Senior career*
Years	Team	Apps	(Gls)
2019	Corpus Christi FC	13	(4)
2020–2021	Hartford Athletic	41	(3)
2022–2023	Northern Colorado Hailstorm	62	(2)
2024–2025	FC Tulsa	31	(2)
2026–	Miami FC	13	(0)
- * Club domestic league appearances and goals as of 13:33, 8 November 2026 (UTC)

Arthur Rogers (born 26 September 1996) is an English professional footballer who plays as a defender for USL Championship club Miami FC.

== Career ==
=== Youth ===
Rogers spent time with both Hanwell Town and Wealdstone, as well as have trials with clubs such as QPR, Brentford, Watford, and Fulham.

=== College and amateur ===
In 2016, Rogers opted to move to the United States to play college soccer at Kentucky Wesleyan College. After a successful first season with the Panthers, he transferred to the University of Texas Rio Grande Valley, where he played for three seasons, making a total of 45 appearances, scoring 3 goals and tallying 10 assists, and was named All-WAC Second Team, as well as the United Soccer Coaches Scholar All-West Region Second Team.

While at college, Rogers also appeared in the USL League Two for Corpus Christi FC.

=== Professional ===
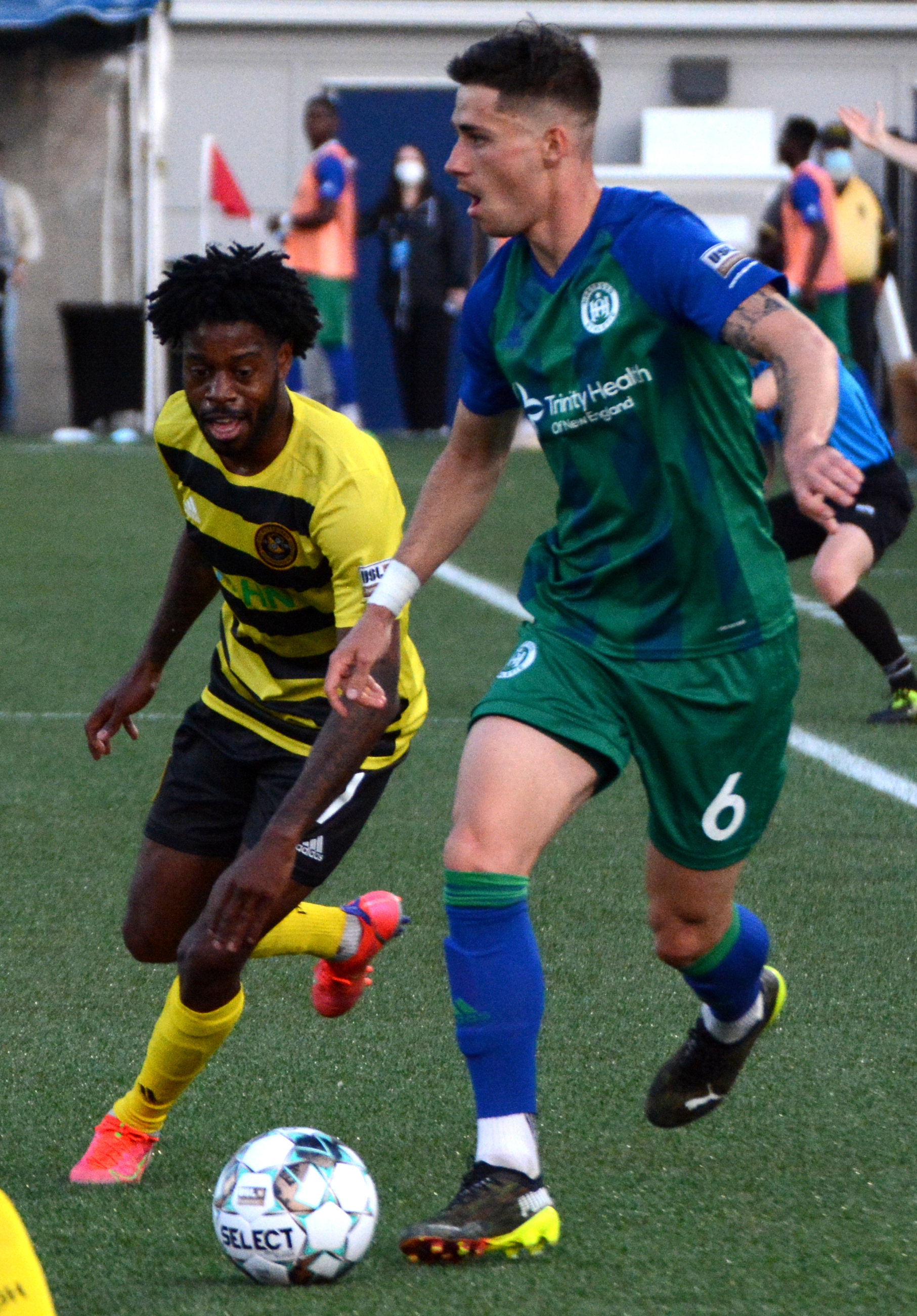
Rogers (right) with Hartford Athletic in 2021

On 23 December 2019, Rogers signed his professional contract with USL Championship side Hartford Athletic ahead of their 2020 season. He made his debut on 17 July 2020, appearing as a 67th-minute substitute during a 1–0 win over New York Red Bulls II. Rogers appeared in 16 of Hartford's 17 matches for the 2020 USL season and on 14 December 2020 he re signed with Hartford for the 2021 season.

On 24 March 2022, it was announced Rogers had joined USL League One club Northern Colorado Hailstorm ahead of their inaugural season. At the end of the season, Rogers was voted the 2022 USL League One Defender of the Year.

Rogers signed with USL Championship side FC Tulsa on 15 December 2023.

On 27 December 2025, Rogers joined league-rivals Miami FC.
