= Shalom Dutey =

Togolese footballer

Personal information
- Date of birth: 20 April 1998 (age 28)
- Place of birth: Lomé, Togo
- Height: 1.88 m (6 ft 2 in)
- Position: Defender

College career
Years	Team	Apps	(Gls)
2016–2019	Liberty Flames	55	(2)

Senior career*
Years	Team	Apps	(Gls)
2016–2018	Tri-Cities Otters	16	(4)
2019	Charlotte Eagles	7	(3)
2020–2024	Charlotte Independence	66	(4)
- * Club domestic league appearances and goals as of 20 November 2024

Shalom Dutey (born 20 April 1998) is a Togolese professional footballer who plays as a defender.

== Career ==
=== Early career ===
Dutey played youth football with the One7 Academy, before heading to Liberty University in 2016 to play in college. Over four seasons with the Flames, Dutey made 55 appearances and scored 2 goals.

Whilst at college, Dutey also played in the USL League Two with Tri-Cities Otters and Charlotte Eagles.

=== Professional ===
Dutey signed his first professional contract with USL Championship side Charlotte Independence ahead of their 2020 season. Dutey didn't appear in 2020, but re-signed with the club on 14 April 2021. He made his professional debut on 1 May 2021, appearing as an 88th-minute substitute during a 3–0 loss to Tampa Bay Rowdies.
