= Stuart Ritchie (soccer) =

American soccer player (born 2001)

Personal information
- Date of birth: September 10, 2001 (age 25)
- Place of birth: Pleasanton, California, United States
- Height: 5 ft 9 in (1.75 m)
- Position: Left-back

Team information
- Current team: Monterey Bay FC
- Number: 3

Youth career
- 2007–2016: Ballistic United
- 2016–2017: San Jose Earthquakes
- 2018–2019: Groningen
- 2019–2021: Hannover 96

Senior career*
Years	Team	Apps	(Gls)
2022	Richmond Kickers	25	(1)
2023	Columbus Crew 2	16	(0)
2024–2025	One Knoxville	48	(2)
2026–	Monterey Bay	22	(0)

International career^{‡}
2018	United States U18	2	(0)
2019	United States U20	1	(0)
- * Club domestic league appearances and goals as of October 31, 2026 ‡ National team caps and goals as of April 6, 2022

Stuart Ritchie (born September 10, 2001) is an American soccer player who currently plays as a left-back for USL Championship side Monterey Bay FC.

== Career ==
=== Youth ===
At the age of five, Ritchie joined his local club side Ballistic United, where he stayed until 2016. Ritchie spent a season with the San Jose Earthquakes academy, before move to Dutch side FC Groningen in January 2018. Ritchie played one season with the Groningen U17's before moving up to the U19 team. He would transition into the U23 team, as well as spending time training with the first team squad. In the summer of 2019, Ritchie moved to German side Hannover 96, where he a played with the team's U19 side, before earning a professional contract with the team's U23 side. Ritchie appeared on the bench for Hannover 96 II in a Regionalliga fixture in 2019.

=== Richmond Kickers ===
On January 25, 2022, it was announced Ritchie had returned to the United States and signed with USL League One club Richmond Kickers. He debuted for the club on April 2, starting in a 4–0 win over FC Tucson.

=== One Knoxville ===
Ritchie joined USL League One club One Knoxville on January 19, 2024.

=== Monterey Bay ===
Ritchie joined Monterey Bay FC on December 12, 2025, marking the first time he played with a USL Championship club and his return to California.
