= Leonardo Baima =

Argentine footballer

Personal information
- Full name: Leonardo Baima
- Date of birth: 5 October 1992 (age 34)
- Place of birth: San Jorge, Argentina
- Height: 1.75 m (5 ft 9 in)
- Position: Midfielder

Senior career*
| Years | Team | Apps | (Gls) |
| 2012–2014 | Boca Juniors | 0 | (0) |
| 2013–2014 | → Aldosivi (loan) | 11 | (1) |
| 2015–2017 | Defensores de Belgrano | 75 | (5) |
| 2018 | Dugopolje | 13 | (0) |
| 2018–2019 | Chacarita Juniors | 12 | (1) |
| 2019 | Nueva Chicago | 14 | (1) |
| 2020 | Platense | 3 | (0) |
| 2020 | General Díaz | | |
| 2021–2022 | Central Norte | 13 | (1) |
| 2022 | Richmond Kickers | 13 | (1) |
| 2023 | Atenas | 13 | (0) |
- * Club domestic league appearances and goals as of 16 October 2022

Leonardo Baima (born 5 October 1992) is an Argentine professional footballer who last played as a midfielder for Atenas in Torneo Federal A. Besides Argentina, he has played in Croatia.

== Career ==
Baima began his footballing career with Boca Juniors. He didn't appear competitively for the club, though was an unused substitute once during the 2012–13 Argentine Primera División season against Unión Santa Fe on 25 August 2012. In June 2013, Baima was loaned to Primera B Nacional's Aldosivi. He made his professional debut during a 3–0 defeat to San Martín on 4 August, prior to netting his first goal against Defensa y Justicia on 24 August. Baima left Boca Juniors permanently in January 2015, joining Defensores de Belgrano in Primera B Metropolitana. Seventy-nine games and five goals followed in three seasons.

On 14 February 2018, Baima completed a move to Croatian Second Football League side Dugopolje. His first appearance for the club arrived on 10 March versus Šibenik, while his final match came in a defeat to Lučko as Dugopolje finished sixth in 2017–18. Baima returned to Argentine football in July 2018 after he signed for Chacarita Juniors in Primera B Nacional.

Baima signed with USL League One club Richmond Kickers on 3 February 2022. At the end of the 2022 season, his contract option was declined by the Kickers.

== Career statistics ==
As of 7 December 2018.

Club statistics
| Club | Season | League | | | Cup (Note: Includes the Copa Argentina and Croatian Football Cup) | | League Cup | | Continental (Note: Includes the Copa Libertadores and Copa Sudamericana) | | Other | | Total | |
| Club | Season | Division | Apps | Goals | Apps | Goals | Apps | Goals | Apps | Goals | Apps | Goals | Apps | Goals |
|---|---|---|---|---|---|---|---|---|---|---|---|---|---|---|
| Boca Juniors | 2012–13 | Primera División | 0 | 0 | 0 | 0 | — | | 0 | 0 | 0 | 0 | 0 | 0 |
| Boca Juniors | 2013–14 | Primera División | 0 | 0 | 0 | 0 | — | | 0 | 0 | 0 | 0 | 0 | 0 |
| Boca Juniors | 2014 | Primera División | 0 | 0 | 0 | 0 | — | | 0 | 0 | 0 | 0 | 0 | 0 |
| Boca Juniors | Total | | 0 | 0 | 0 | 0 | — | | — | | 0 | 0 | 0 | 0 |
| Aldosivi (loan) | 2013–14 | Primera B Nacional | 11 | 1 | 1 | 0 | — | | — | | 0 | 0 | 12 | 1 |
| Defensores de Belgrano | 2015 | Primera B Metropolitana | 28 | 3 | 0 | 0 | — | | — | | 1 (Note: One appearance in the 2015 Primera B Metropolitana play-offs) | 0 | 29 | 3 |
| Defensores de Belgrano | 2016 | Primera B Metropolitana | 16 | 0 | 0 | 0 | — | | — | | 0 | 0 | 16 | 0 |
| Defensores de Belgrano | 2016–17 | Primera B Metropolitana | 31 | 2 | 2 | 0 | — | | — | | 1 (Note: One appearance in the 2016–17 Primera B Metropolitana play-offs) | 0 | 34 | 2 |
| Defensores de Belgrano | Total | | 75 | 5 | 2 | 0 | — | | — | | 2 | 0 | 79 | 5 |
| Dugopolje | 2017–18 | Second League | 13 | 0 | 0 | 0 | — | | — | | 0 | 0 | 13 | 0 |
| Chacarita Juniors | 2018–19 | Primera B Nacional | 8 | 1 | 0 | 0 | — | | — | | 0 | 0 | 8 | 1 |
| Career total | | | 107 | 7 | 3 | 0 | — | | — | | 2 | 0 | 112 | 7 |
