= Ernesto Espinoza =

American soccer player (born 1999)

Moe Espinoza
Personal information
- Full name: Ernesto Espinoza Vázquez
- Date of birth: May 11, 1999 (age 27)
- Place of birth: San Diego, California, United States
- Height: 1.70 m (5 ft 7 in)
- Position: Winger

Youth career
- –2013: Nomads SC
- 2013–2019: Tijuana

Senior career*
Years	Team	Apps	(Gls)
2017–2019	Tijuana Premier	8	(1)
2019	Chula Vista		
2019–2021	San Diego 1904	22	(2)
2022–2023	Chattanooga Red Wolves	48	(8)
2024	Central Valley Fuego	3	(1)

International career
2016	United States U18	4	(1)
2016	United States U19	4	(1)
- * Club domestic league appearances and goals as of October 31, 2024

Ernesto "Moe" Espinoza Vázquez (born May 11, 1999) is an American soccer player who plays as a winger.

== Career ==
A native of San Ysidro, San Diego, Espinoza played club soccer with local side Nomads SC, before moving to the academy team for Liga MX side Tijuana. Here he played at various youth levels, also appearing the team's third-division reserve team Tijuana Premier, making eight appearances and scoring a single goal. He left Tijuana in 2019.

Espinoza had a short spell with amateur side Chula Vista FC in the SoCal Premier League, before signing with NISA club San Diego 1904 ahead of their inaugural season. He went on to appear 22 times for San Diego over three seasons, scoring two goals and tallying four assists.

On March 31, 2022, Espinoza signed with USL League One club Chattanooga Red Wolves ahead of their 2022 season. He debuted for the Red Wolves on April 2, 2022, appearing as a 66th–minute substitute during a 1–1 draw with Forward Madison.

On March 9, 2024, Espinoza signed with USL League One's Central Valley Fuego.

== International ==
Espinoza had appeared at various youth levels, including U15, U18 and U19, for the United States men's national soccer team.
