= Emiliano Terzaghi =

Argentinian footballer (born 1993)

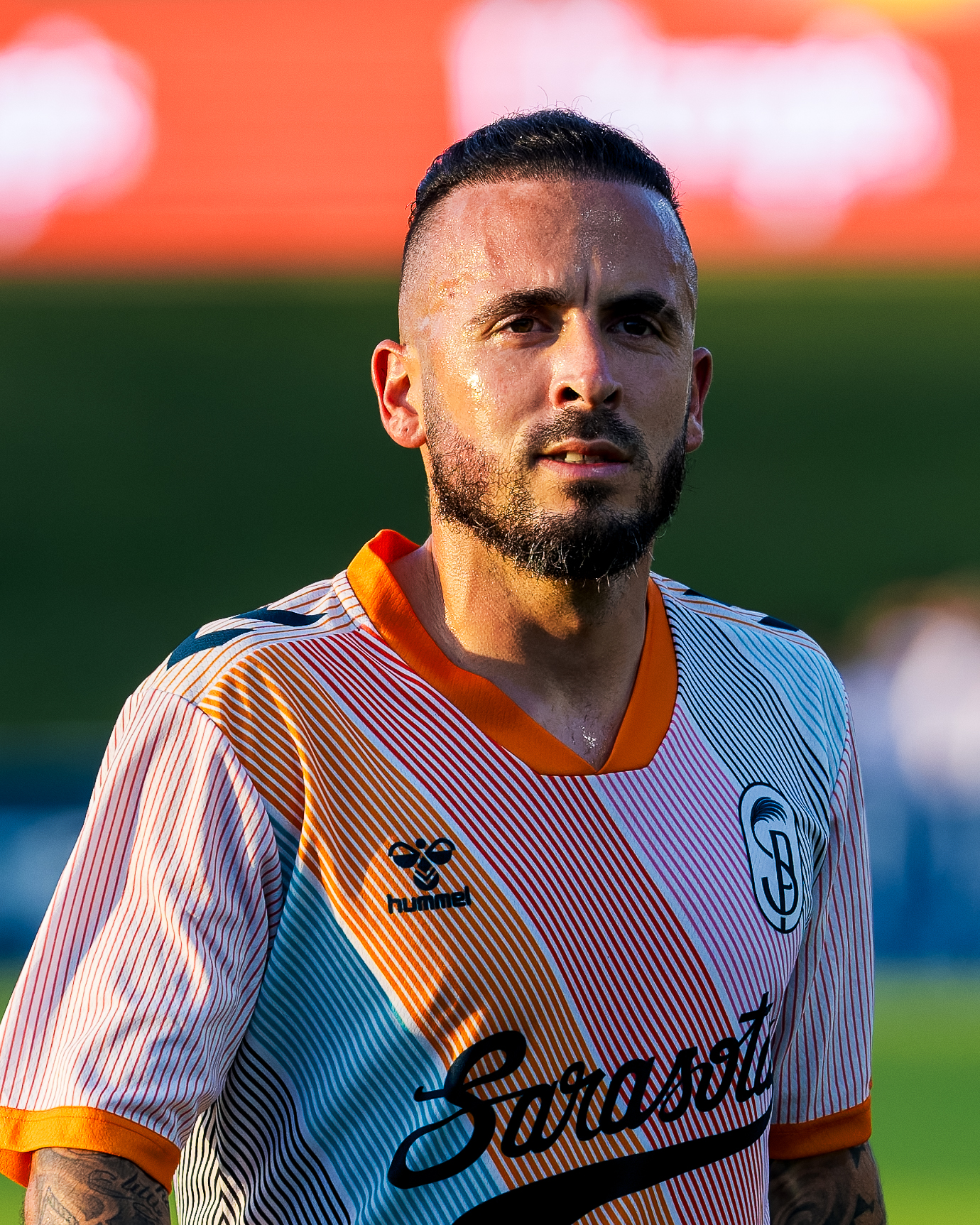
- Terzaghi with Sarasota Paradise in 2026

Personal information
- Full name: Emiliano Franco Terzaghi
- Date of birth: 6 March 1993 (age 33)
- Place of birth: Buenos Aires, Argentina
- Height: 1.70 m (5 ft 7 in)
- Position: Forward

Youth career
- Banfield

Senior career*
Years	Team	Apps	(Gls)
2011–2016	Banfield	40	(6)
2015	→ Temperley (loan)	6	(0)
2016	Boca Unidos	5	(1)
2017	Defensores de Belgrano	16	(0)
2017–2018	Unión Villa Krause	19	(1)
2018	Huracán Las Heras	5	(0)
2019	San Martín de Burzaco	14	(2)
2020–2025	Richmond Kickers	131	(62)
2026	Portland Hearts of Pine	4	(0)
2026	Sarasota Paradise	22	(4)
- * Club domestic league appearances and goals as of 13:34, 2 November 2026 (UTC)

Emiliano Franco Terzaghi (born 6 March 1993) is an Argentine professional footballer who plays as a forward. Terzaghi most recently played for USL League One club Sarasota Paradise.

He previously played for several clubs in Argentina, including Club Atlético Banfield, and spent five decorated seasons with USL League One side Richmond Kickers. He is the all-time top scorer in USL League One, and won three consecutive USL League One MVP awards from 2020 to 2022.

== Career ==
=== Early career ===
==== Banfield ====
Terzaghi played in his native Argentina from 2011 to 2020. A graduate of the Banfield youth academy, Terzaghi made 40 appearances for Banfield between 2011 and 2016. He made nine appearances in Banfield's 2013–14 campaign, which saw El Taladro win the Primera B Nacional title, achieving promotion to the Argentine Primera División.

==== Later years in Argentina ====
He was loaned to Temperley in 2015, making seven appearances for El Cele, before leaving Banfield and moving to Boca Unidos in 2016. After failing to break into the first team at Aurirrojo, Terzaghi moved to Defensores de Belgrano in 2017. After brief and largely unsuccessful spells with Unión de Villa Krause, Huracán Las Heras, and San Martín de Burzaco, he moved to the United States.

=== Richmond Kickers ===
==== 2020 ====
On 24 January 2020, Terzaghi moved to the United States, signing with USL League One side Richmond Kickers. Terzaghi led the league in goals and was recognized as the 2020 USL League One MVP in his first season with Richmond.

On 1 December 2020 Terzaghi signed a contract extension keeping him in Richmond for the 2021 and 2022 seasons.

==== 2021 ====
Terzaghi once again led the league in goals with 18. On 20 November 2021 he was awarded a second consecutive USL League One MVP award for the 2021 season.

==== 2022 ====
For the third season in a row, Terzaghi led the league in goals with 17, helping the Kickers finish first in the regular season table. On 4 November 2022 he was awarded an unprecedented third consecutive USL League One MVP award for the 2022 season. On 18 November 2022 Richmond Kickers announced they re-signed Terzaghi to a multi-year deal.

==== Later years in Richmond ====
Terzaghi missed much of the 2024 USL League One season with an injury, limiting him to 18 appearances and three goals across all competitions. He would be more available in 2025, appearing in 25 matches, but he did not return to his earlier form, scoring just four times across all competitions.

Following the 2025 season, Terzaghi left the Kickers.

=== Portland Hearts of Pine ===
On 5 January 2026, Terzaghi signed with fellow USL League One team Portland Hearts of Pine. He made his debut for the Hearts of Pine on 17 March, coming on as a substitute in a 1−0 U.S. Open Cup defeat to Vermont Green FC. He made five appearances without scoring across all competitions for the Hearts before transferring in June.

=== Sarasota Paradise ===
On June 12, 2026, Terzaghi was transferred to Sarasota Paradise, also in USL League One. He scored one goal and assisted another in his debut, a 2–0 Sarasota victory over Union Omaha on 13 June.

== Honors ==
=== Individual ===
- USL League One MVP: 2020, 2021, 2022
- USL League One Golden Boot: 2020, 2021, 2022
- USL League One All-League First Team: 2020, 2021, 2022

=== Club ===
==== Banfield ====
- Primera B Nacional: 2013–14

== Personal life ==
Terzaghi was born and raised in Buenos Aires. He is married and has two children, a daughter and a son.
