= Nathan Aune =

American soccer player (born 1996)

Personal information
- Date of birth: October 27, 1996 (age 30)
- Place of birth: Everett, Washington, United States
- Height: 1.94 m (6 ft 4 in)
- Position: Defender

Youth career
- Snohomish United
- Washington Crossfire

College career
Years	Team	Apps	(Gls)
2015–2018	Seattle Redhawks	65	(4)

Senior career*
Years	Team	Apps	(Gls)
2016	Washington Crossfire	12	(1)
2017–2018	Seattle Sounders FC U-23	18	(1)
2019	Reno 1868	2	(0)
2020	Union Omaha	4	(0)
2021–2024	Richmond Kickers	78	(4)
- * Club domestic league appearances and goals as of November 23, 2024

Nathan Aune (born October 27, 1996) is an American soccer player.

== Career ==
=== College and amateur ===
Aune spent his entire college soccer career at Seattle University between 2015 and 2018. He made a total of 65 appearances for the Redhawks and tallied 4 goals and 1 assist.

He also played in the Premier Development League for the Washington Crossfire and Seattle Sounders FC U-23.

=== Professional ===
On January 14, 2019, Aune was selected 50th overall in the 2019 MLS SuperDraft by San Jose Earthquakes.

On March 21, 2019, Aune joined San Jose's USL Championship affiliate side Reno 1868.

In January 2020, Aune was announced as part of USL League One club Union Omaha's first-ever batch of signed players. He was released by Omaha following their 2020 season.

Aune joined USL League One side Richmond Kickers on February 18, 2021.

On 1 December 2024, Aune left the club when his contract expired.
