= Aaron Lombardi =

Argentine footballer (born 1995)

Personal information
- Full name: Nahuel Aaron Lombardi
- Date of birth: December 20, 1995 (age 30)
- Place of birth: Rosario, Santa Fe, Argentina
- Height: 1.80 m (5 ft 11 in)
- Positions: Left-back; left winger

Team information
- Current team: Chattanooga Red Wolves
- Number: 30

Youth career
- 2012–2014: LA Galaxy

College career
Years	Team	Apps	(Gls)
2014–2017	San Francisco Dons	58	(8)

Senior career*
Years	Team	Apps	(Gls)
2018	San Francisco City	2	(0)
2019	Orange County FC	12	(1)
2020	Union Fossacesia	21	(5)
2020–2021	Olympia Agnonese	9	(0)
2021	Lanciano		
2021–2022	Union Fossacesia		
2022–2023	Chattanooga Red Wolves	52	(1)
2024	South Georgia Tormenta	18	(1)
2025–	Chattanooga Red Wolves	45	(4)
- * Club domestic league appearances and goals as of 16:48, 31 October 2026 (UTC)

Nahuel Aaron Lombardi (born 20 December 1995) is an Argentine footballer who plays as a left-back for Chattanooga Red Wolves in USL League One.

== Career ==
=== Youth ===
Lombardi was born in Rosario, Santa Fe in Argentina and migrated to the United States when he was six years old, and grew up in Southern California, attending Laguna Hills High School. Lombardi also played with the LA Galaxy academy between 2012 and 2014.

=== College and amateur ===
In 2014, Lombardi attended the University of San Francisco to play college soccer. In four seasons with the Dons, Lombardi made 58 appearances, scoring eight goals and tallying 19 assists. In 2014 he was named WCC All-Freshman, and in 2016 and 2017 was named 2nd Team All-WCC.

Following college, Lombardi played in the USL PDL with San Francisco City, making two appearances. 2019 saw Lombardi join NPSL club Orange County FC, making 12 appearances and scoring one goal.

=== Professional ===
Between February 2020 and early 2022, Lombardi played in Italy with various Serie D sides, including; Fossacesia, Olympia Agnonese and Lanciano.

On 27 January 2022, Lombardi returned to the United States to join USL League One side Chattanooga Red Wolves. He later moved to fellow USL League One side Tormenta FC ahead of the 2024 season, before returning to the Red Wolves for 2025.
