= 2022 Central Valley Fuego FC season =

Central Valley Fuego FC
2022 season
- Owner: Juan and Alicia Ruelas
- Head coach: Jaime Ramirez
- Stadium: Fresno State Soccer Stadium
- USL1 Playoffs: DNQ
- U.S. Open Cup: Third Round
- Highest home attendance: 2,752 (5/7 vs. GVL)
- Lowest home attendance: 1,075 (8/6 vs. OMA)
- Average home league attendance: 1,594
- Biggest win: TRM 0–4 CV (5/21)
- Biggest defeat: CLT 4–0 CV (7/29)

The 2022 Central Valley Fuego FC season was the first season in the club's existence. It marked the return of professional soccer to Fresno since USL Championship club Fresno FC dissolved in October 2019. The club played its first season in USL League One in the third division of the American soccer pyramid. They played their home games at Fresno State Soccer Stadium on the campus of Fresno State University.

Jaime Ramirez, initially named the team's sporting director, was later named the head coach in late December. He would resign his position in the preseason, and was replaced by Milton Blanco in the interim. Martín Vásquez was named the permanent head coach on April 14.

== Club ==
=== Roster ===
As of March 10, 2022

No.	Pos.	Nation	Player
1	GK	ISR	Ofek Antman
4	DF	ENG	William Gillingham
5	DF	USA	Nathan Smith
6	MF	USA	Ozzie Ramos
7	MF	SEN	Mouhamed Dabo
8	MF	SWE	Victor Falck
9	FW	USA	Christian Chaney
10	MF	USA	Anthony Velarde
12	FW	USA	Michael McFarlane
13	DF	HAI	Francois Dulysse
14	MF	USA	Julian Chavez
15	DF	USA	Jordan Chavez
16	MF	USA	Neil Boyal
17	FW	USA	Tunde Akinlosotu
18	GK	USA	Mitch North
20	FW	BUL	Villyan Bijev
22	MF	MEX	Diego Casillas
23	FW	PER	Renato Bustamante
28	MF	USA	Marco Torralva
30	DF	CHI	Maxi Schenfeld
31	GK	USA	Matías Fernández
32	MF	USA	Alan Gutierrez
—	DF	GER	Michael Hornsby

== Competitions ==
=== Exhibitions ===
February 26, 2022 Preseason 1	Sacramento Republic FC	3–2	Fuego FC	Sacramento, California
2:00 PM PST		Report		Stadium: Cosumnes River College Stadium

March 5, 2022 Preseason 2	Oakland Roots SC	1–0	Fuego FC	Oakland, California
3:00 PM PST		Report

March 12, 2022 Preseason 3	Fuego FC	v	Cal State Northridge
3:00 PM PDT

=== USL League One ===
==== Standings ====
Pos	Team	Pld	W	L	T	GF	GA	GD	Pts	Qualification
6	Charlotte Independence	30	12	12	6	48	48	0	42	Qualification for the play-offs
7	Northern Colorado Hailstorm FC	30	11	10	9	42	38	+4	42	
8	Central Valley Fuego FC	30	11	12	7	37	40	−3	40	
9	Forward Madison FC	30	7	11	12	34	44	−10	33	
10	FC Tucson	30	8	14	8	34	44	−10	32	

Source: USL League One
Rules for classification: 1) points; 2) total wins; 3) total goal differential; 4) total goals scored; 5) points earned against top four Conference finishers; 6) disciplinary points; 7) drawing of lots.

==== Match results ====
April 2, 2022 1	Greenville Triumph	0–2	Fuego FC	Greenville, South Carolina
4:00 PM PDT	Smith (yellow card) 13'; Lee (yellow card) 40'; Labovitz (yellow card) 67'	Report	Falck (yellow card) 20'; Chaney 56', 69'; Casillas (yellow card) 80'; Antman (yellow card) 86'	Stadium: Legacy Early College Field; Attendance: 2,561; Referee: William Steffen

April 8, 2022 2	Charlotte Independence	3–3	Fuego FC	Charlotte, North Carolina
4:00 PM PDT	Mbuyu 32', 41'; Dutey 89'; McNeill (yellow card) 90'; Dimick (yellow card) 90+7'	Report	Chaney (yellow card) 34'; Ramos 39', (yellow card) 43'; Bijev 81', 90+6'	Stadium: American Legion Memorial Stadium; Attendance: 2,435; Referee: Izlen Peksenar

April 23, 2022 3	Union Omaha	3–0	Fuego FC	Papillion, Nebraska
4:00 PM PDT	Kametani 48'; Malcolm 90'; Scearce 90+4' (pen.)	Report	S. Chavez (yellow card) 15' (yellow-red card) 90+3'; Ramos (yellow card) 17'; Smith (yellow card) 63'; Casillas (yellow card) 90+4'	Stadium: Werner Park; Attendance: 3,375; Referee: Greg Dopka

April 30, 2022 4	Forward Madison	0–1	Fuego FC	Madison, Wisconsin
3:00 PM PDT	Maldonado (yellow card) 27'; Leonard (yellow card) 44'; Bartman (yellow card) 90+6'	Report	Ramos (yellow card); Partida (yellow card) 51', (goal) 54'; Schenfeld (yellow card) 61'; Dulysse (yellow card) 81'; Smith (yellow card) 82'; Antman (yellow card) 87'	Stadium: Breese Stevens Field; Attendance: 2,605; Referee: Jervis Atagana

May 7, 2022 5	Fuego FC	1–1	Greenville Triumph	Fresno, California
7:30 PM PDT	Falck (yellow card) 6'; Ramos (yellow card) 41'; Casillas 45+3'; Smith (yellow card) 68'; Chaney (yellow card) 71'; Dieye (yellow card) 84'	Report	Gavilanes (yellow card) 46'; Dulysse 53' (o.g.); Lee (yellow card) 90+3'	Stadium: Fresno State Soccer Stadium; Attendance: 2,752; Referee: Adam Zarrin

May 14, 2022 6	Chattanooga Red Wolves	2–2	Fuego FC	East Ridge, Tennessee
4:30 PM PDT	Mentzingen 3'; Galindrez 45+5' (pen.); Lombardi (yellow card) 50'; Luna (yellow card) 56'; Cardona (yellow card) 89'; Carrera-García (red card) 90'	Report	Casillas 15'; Falck 45+3'; Schenfeld (yellow card) 90+7'	Stadium: CHI Memorial Stadium; Attendance: 2,104; Referee: Kyle Johnston

May 21, 2022 7	Tormenta FC	0–4	Fuego FC	Statesboro, Georgia
4:30 PM PDT	Sterling (yellow card) 31'	Report	Falck 12'; S. Chavez 17'; Bijev 35', 42'; Schenfeld (yellow card) 59'; Dulysse (yellow card) 61'; Hornsby (yellow card) 75'; Antman (yellow card) 77'; Bustamante (yellow card) 90'	Stadium: Optim Health System Field; Attendance: 1,254; Referee: Alejo Calume

May 28, 2022 8	Fuego FC	1–1	Forward Madison	Fresno, California
7:30 PM PDT	Smith (yellow card) 79'; Dieye (yellow card) 81'; Bijev 90+2'	Report	Conner (yellow card) 41'; Leonard (yellow card) 56'; Streng 82'; Bartman (yellow card) 90'	Stadium: Fresno State Soccer Stadium; Referee: Karen Callado

June 11, 2022 9	Fuego FC	0–2	Chattanooga Red Wolves	Fresno, California
7:30 PM PDT	Dieye (yellow card) 13'; Gillingham (yellow card) 40'; Schenfeld (yellow card) 45'; Diaz (yellow card) 69'; Antman (yellow card) 78'	Report	Mentzingen (yellow card) 45+2'; Mehl (yellow card) 70'; Espinoza 81'; Galindrez 90+5', (yellow card) 90+5'	Stadium: Fresno State Soccer Stadium; Attendance: 1,545; Referee: Laura Rodriguez

June 18, 2022 10	Fuego FC	0–0	FC Tucson	Fresno, California
7:30 PM PDT	Ramos (yellow card) 21'; Dieye (yellow card) 48'; Schenfeld (yellow card) 56'; Chaney (yellow card) 90+3'	Report	Fahling (yellow card) 65'; Bedoya (yellow card) 73'; Shaw (yellow card) 78'	Stadium: Fresno State Soccer Stadium; Referee: Joseph Salinas

June 22, 2022 11	Hailstorm FC	4–1	Fuego FC	Windsor, Colorado
6:00 PM PDT	McLean 21'; Amann 41'; Parra (yellow card) 50', (goal) 74'; Hernández 77'	Report	Casillas 7'; Gillingham (yellow card) 45+2'; Dieye (yellow card) 83'; Smith (yellow card) 90+6' (yellow-red card) 90+7'	Stadium: Future Legends Complex; Referee: Joshua Belzer

June 25, 2022 12	Fuego FC	3–2	North Carolina FC	Fresno, California
7:30 PM PDT	Ramos (yellow card) 17'; S. Chavez (yellow card) 18'; Dulysse (yellow card) 22'; Schenfeld 30'; Chaney 45+5', 75'; Antman (yellow card) 65'; Diaz (yellow card) 80'	Report	Servania (yellow card) 18'; Anderson 37', (yellow card) 66'; Fernandes (yellow card) 45+2'; McLaughlin 90'	Stadium: Fresno State Soccer Stadium; Attendance: 1,753; Referee: Michael Zapata

July 2, 2022 13	Fuego FC	0–1	Tormenta FC	Fresno, California
7:30 PM PDT	Dullysse (yellow card) 31'; Villarreal (yellow card) 78'	Report	Cabral 60'; Nembhard (yellow card) 70'; Jara (yellow card) 87'; Soto (yellow card) 90+4'	Stadium: Fresno State Soccer Stadium; Attendance: 1,546; Referee: Robert Vincze

July 9, 2022 14	Greenville Triumph	1–0	Fuego FC	Greenville, South Carolina
4:00 PM PDT	Evans 66'	Report	Casillas (yellow card) 80'	Stadium: Legacy Early College Field; Attendance: 1,832; Referee: Josiah Parke

July 13, 2022 15	Hailstorm FC	0–1	Fuego FC	Windsor, Colorado
6:00 PM PDT	Folla (yellow card) 37'; Lukic (yellow card) 65' (yellow-red card) 90'; Nortey (yellow card) 90'; Cornwall (yellow card) 90+4'	Report	Ramos (yellow card) 26'; Torralva (yellow card) 32'; Partida (yellow card) 54'; Chaney (yellow card) 87', (goal) 90+2'	Stadium: Future Legends Complex; Attendance: 596; Referee: Esad Omanovic

July 23, 2022 16	Fuego FC	3–1	Richmond Kickers	Fresno, California
7:30 PM PDT	Falck 16', 35'; Hornsby (yellow card) 45'; Partida (yellow card) 53'; Cerritos 58'; Strong (yellow card) 63'	Report	Payne (yellow card) 15' (yellow-red card) 19'; Barnathan 45', (yellow card) 76'; Aune (red card) 48'; Fitzgerald (yellow card) 56'; Candela (yellow card) 90+3'	Stadium: Fresno State Soccer Stadium; Attendance: 1,345; Referee: Adrian Gonzalez

July 29, 2022 17	Charlotte Independence	4–0	Fuego FC	Charlotte, North Carolina
4:00 PM PDT	Dutey (yellow card) 12'; Ciss (yellow card) 16'; Bennett (yellow card) 20', (goal) 39', 45+3', 64'; Santos (yellow card) 43'; Acosta 52'	Report	S. Chavez (yellow card) 66'; Keslley (yellow card) 73'; Chaney (yellow card) 90+1'	Stadium: American Legion Memorial Stadium; Attendance: 1,511; Referee: Emma Richards

August 3, 2022 18	Fuego FC	0–1	Chattanooga Red Wolves	Fresno, California
7:30 PM PDT	Casillas (yellow card) 29' (yellow-red card) 45+3'; Bijev (yellow card) 39'; Antman (yellow card) 74'; Dieye (yellow card) 77'; Partida (yellow card) 90+2'; Chaney (penalty missed) 90+6'	Report	Cartagena (yellow card) 20'; Carrera-García (yellow card) 49'; A. Hernández 74'; Saunders (yellow card) 85'	Stadium: Fresno State Soccer Stadium; Attendance: 1,143; Referee: Killian Richardson

August 6, 2022 19	Fuego FC	0–1	Union Omaha	Fresno, California
7:30 PM PDT	Bijev (penalty missed) 16'; Partida (yellow card) 29'; Chaney (yellow card) 78'; S. Chavez (yellow card) 90+7'	Report	Nuhu (yellow card) 16'; Scearce 23'; Brito (yellow card) 40'	Stadium: Fresno State Soccer Stadium; Attendance: 1,075; Referee: Joseph Salinas

August 13, 2022 20	North Carolina FC	0–1	Fuego FC	Cary, North Carolina
4:00 PM PDT	Martinez (yellow card) 19'; Servania (yellow card) 78'; Tahir (yellow card) 90+4'	Report	Smith 34'; Dieye (yellow card) 40'; Gillingham (yellow card) 45+2'; Bijev (yellow card) 61'; Chaney (yellow card) 90+8'	Stadium: Sahlen's Stadium at WakeMed Soccer Park; Attendance: 5,092; Referee: Joshua Encarnación

August 20, 2022 21	Fuego FC	2–2	Richmond Kickers	Fresno, California
7:30 PM PDT	Falck 24' (yellow card) 32'; Smith (yellow card) 36'; Villarreal (yellow card) 57'; North (yellow card) 60'; Schenfeld 67'	Report	Bolanos (yellow card) 38'; Aune (yellow card) 57'; Terzaghi 70' (pen.); Bentley 90+3'	Stadium: Fresno State Soccer Stadium; Attendance: 1,193; Referee: Robert Vincze

August 27, 2022 22	Fuego FC	0–2	Tormenta FC	Fresno, California
7:30 PM PDT	Casillas (yellow card) 24'; Cerritos (yellow card) 65'; Schenfeld (yellow card) 70'	Report	Cabral (yellow card) 25'; Sterling 26', 54'; Phelps (yellow card) 45+5'; Akale (yellow card) 54'; Sierakowski (yellow card) 71'; Billhardt (yellow card) 90+5'	Stadium: Fresno State Soccer Stadium; Attendance: 1,074; Referee: Adam Zarrin

August 31, 2022 23	Fuego FC	3–2	FC Tucson	Fresno, California
7:30 PM PDT	Chaney 34', (yellow card) 45+3'; Dieye 52'; Falck (yellow card) 57', (goal) 75'; Dabo (yellow card) 78'	Report	F. Pérez 16', (yellow card) 81'; Toia 25'; Sunday (red card) 40'; Fahling (yellow card) 45' (red card) 90+1'; L. Perez (yellow card) 77'	Stadium: Fresno State Soccer Stadium; Attendance: 826; Referee: Adrian Gonzalez

September 17, 2022 25	Fuego FC	0–3	Charlotte Independence	Fresno, California
7:30 PM PDT	Smith (yellow card) 36'; Dullysse (yellow card) 36'; Villarreal (yellow card) 45+1'	Report	Falck 38' (o.g.); Bennett 43', 55', (yellow card) 79'; Mbuyu (yellow card) 58'; Zendejas (yellow card) 64'	Stadium: Fresno State Soccer Stadium; Referee: Samantha Martinez

September 21, 2022 26	Fuego FC	3–0	Forward Madison	Fresno, California
7:30 PM PDT	Chaney 9'; Ramos (yellow card) 51'; Dieye 82', 90+2'	Report	Conner (yellow card) 36' (yellow-red card) 73'; Cassini (red card) 50'	Stadium: Fresno State Soccer Stadium; Attendance: 1,078; Referee: Karen Callado

September 24, 2022 27	Richmond Kickers	1–1	Fuego FC	Richmond, Virginia
3:30 PM PDT	Bryant 36'; Bolanos (yellow card) 58'; Crisler (yellow card) 75'	Report	Ramos (yellow card) 31'; Schenfeld (yellow card) 43'; Bijev (yellow card) 55'; Crisler 69' (o.g.); S. Chavez (yellow card) 74' (yellow-red card) 80'	Stadium: City Stadium; Referee: Joshua Encarnación

September 28, 2022 24	North Carolina FC	2–1	Fuego FC	Cary, North Carolina
4:00 PM PDT	Fernandes (yellow card) 9'; McLaughlin 22'; Skelton (yellow card) 47'; Rincon 68'; Pecka (yellow card) 90'; Servania (yellow card) 90+5'	Report	Vera (yellow card) 24'; Chaney 29', (yellow card) 90+2'; Dabo (yellow card) 58'; Falck (yellow card) 63'; Strong (red card) 73'; Hornsby (yellow card) 76'; Dullysse (yellow card) 90+4'	Stadium: Sahlen's Stadium at WakeMed Soccer Park; Referee: Josiah Parke
Note: Re-schedule of Sept. 10 match that was postponed due to travel difficulties.

October 1, 2022 28	Fuego FC	0–1	Hailstorm FC	Fresno, California
7:30 PM PDT	Dieye (yellow card) 10'; Falck (yellow card) 58'; Schenfeld (yellow card) 72'; Dabo (yellow card) 86'; Smith (yellow card) 90+7'	Report	Amann (yellow card) 14'; Dullysse 62' (o.g.); Cornwall (yellow card) 58'; Hernández (yellow card) 71'	Stadium: Fresno State Soccer Stadium; Referee: Brandon Stevis

October 5, 2022 29	FC Tucson	0–2	Fuego FC	Tucson, Arizona
7:00 PM PDT	Mastrantonio (yellow card) 12'	Report	Villarreal (yellow card) 13'; Chaney (yellow card) 43' (goal) 68'; Casillas (yellow card) 45+2'; Vazquez 50'; Smith (yellow card) 70'	Stadium: Kino North Stadium; Referee: DeShun Beard

October 15, 2022 30	Union Omaha	0–2	Fuego FC	Papillion, Nebraska
2:00 PM PDT	Rivera (yellow card) 23'	Report	Casillas (yellow card) 32'; S. Chavez (yellow card) 40'; Villarreal (yellow card) 45+2'; Dieye 61', (yellow card) 74'; Chaney (yellow card) 78', (goal) 90+10'; Gillingham (yellow card) 79'	Stadium: Werner Park; Attendance: 3,174; Referee: Ricardo Fierro

=== U.S. Open Cup ===
Fuego FC made their Open Cup debut in the Second Round.

April 5 2nd Round	Fuego FC (USL1) (California)	4–1	(Texas) El Paso Locomotive FC (USLC)	Clovis, California
7:30 pm PDT	Bijev 4', 44'; Smith 15'; Chaney 62'	Report	John-Brown (red card) 58'; Calvillo 90'	Stadium: Lamonica Stadium at Clovis High School; Referee: Michael Zapata

April 20 3rd Round	Sacramento Republic FC (USLC) (California)	2–1	(California) Central Valley Fuego FC (USL1)	Sacramento, California
7:30 pm PDT	Casey 44'; LaGrassa (yellow card) 54'; López 90+4' (pen.)	Report	Smith (yellow card) 56'; Bustamante 78'; Dullysse (yellow card) 80'; Ramos (yellow card) 89'	Stadium: Heart Health Park; Attendance: 3,712
