= 2022 FC Tucson season =

FC Tucson
2022 season
- Owner: Benevolent Sports Tucson, LLC
- Manager: (United States) Jon Pearlman
- Stadium: Kino North Stadium
- USL1 2022 season: 10th Place
- USL1 Playoffs: Did not qualify
- Top goalscorer: Louis Perez; Donny Toia (5)
- Highest home attendance: 1,785 (July 3 vs Greenville Triumph SC)
- Lowest home attendance: League: 855 (September 20 vs North Carolina FC); All: 528 (Cal. United Strikers, USOC)
- Average home league attendance: 1,259
- Biggest win: 3–0 (September 11 vs Union Omaha)
- Biggest defeat: 0–4 (April 2 vs Richmond Kickers)
Home colors	Away colors

2022 FC Tucson season was the twelfth season in the soccer team's history and their fourth in USL League One.

== Players and staff ==
=== Roster ===
No.	Name	Nationality	Position(s)	Date of birth (age)	Signed in	Previous club
Goalkeepers
1	Sean Murray	(United States)	GK	March 12, 1999 (age 27)	2022	(United States) Monmouth University
23	Carlos Merancio	(Mexico)	GK	September 14, 1998 (age 28)	2022	(United States) Hartford Athletic
30	Emiliano Andraux	(United States)	GK	May 2, 2002 (age 24)	2020	(United States) FC Tucson Academy
Defenders
2	Donny Toia	(United States)	DF / FW	May 28, 1992 (age 34)	2022	(United States) Real Salt Lake
4	Luca Mastrantonio	(Italy)	DF	May 27, 1996 (age 30)	2021	(United States) UC Irvine
5	Kaelon Fox	(United States)	DF	May 31, 1995 (age 31)	2021	(Iceland) Þór Akureyri
12	Tyler Allen	(United States)	DF	October 12, 1998 (age 27)	2022	(United States) Forward Madison FC
16	Jake Crull	(United States)	DF	October 3, 1997 (age 28)	2022	(United States) Union Omaha
17	Tarn Weir	(United States)	DF	April 10, 1999 (age 27)	2022	(United States) Oakland Roots SC
22	Tyler Moss	(United States)	DF	December 27, 1998 (age 27)	2022	(United States) Sacramento State University
27	Eric Kinzner	(United States)	DF	March 22, 2003 (age 23)	2022	(United States) Tacoma Defiance (loan)
49	Diego Ruiz	(United States)	DF	July 16, 2003 (age 23)	2022	(United States) FC Tucson Academy
Midfielders
6	Elijah Wynder	(United States)	MF	March 10, 2003 (age 23)	2022	(United States) Louisville City FC (loan)
7	João Delgado	(Portugal)	MF	January 16, 1994 (age 32)	2021	(United States) Reading United AC
8	Daniel Bedoya	(Colombia)	MF	February 13, 1994 (age 32)	2022	(United States) New Amsterdam FC
11	Kevin Rodriguez	(United States)	MF	September 25, 1996 (age 29)	2022	(United States) Rio Grande Valley FC
13	Louis Perez	(France)	MF	June 11, 1997 (age 29)	2022	(United States) Pittsburgh Riverhounds SC
18	Tevin Shaw	(Jamaica)	MF	February 24, 1997 (age 29)	2022	(Canada) Atlético Ottawa
21	Mueng Sunday	(Nigeria)	MF	March 1, 1994 (age 32)	2022	(United States) OKC Energy FC
25	Charlie Machell	(England)	MF	October 25, 1994 (age 31)	2022	(Oman) Al-Ittihad Club
31	Brandon Sanchez	(United States)	MF	September 12, 2003 (age 23)	2021	(United States) FC Tucson Academy
32	Burke Fahling	(United States)	MF	August 3, 1997 (age 29)	2022	(United States) Charleston Battery (loan)
38	Jerod Allen	(United States)	MF	August 17, 2004 (age 22)	2021	(United States) FC Tucson Academy
Forwards
9	Yuki Shibata	(Japan)	FW	January 15, 1998 (age 28)	2022	(United States) Stumptown AC
10	Deri Corfe	(England)	FW	March 3, 1998 (age 28)	2021	(United States) New York Red Bulls II
14	Fernando Garcia	(United States)	FW	May 21, 1999 (age 27)	2022	(United States) Des Moines Menace
20	Daniel Bloyou	(Ghana)	FW	April 18, 2000 (age 26)	2022	(United States) Penn State
29	Franco Pérez	(Argentina)	FW	November 4, 1998 (age 27)	2022	(Argentina) Club Atlético Aldosivi (loan)
33	Nick Hanus	(United States)	FW	February 25, 2003 (age 23)	2022	(United States) FC Tucson Academy
91	Gio Calixtro	(United States)	FW	June 27, 2000 (age 26)	2021	(United States) Portland Timbers 2

USL Academy contract.

=== Coaching staff ===
Name	Position
(United States) Jon Pearlman	Head coach
(United States) Mark Biagi	Assistant coach
(United States) Sebastian Pineda	Assistant coach & Academy Head Coach
(United States) Vito Higgins	Goalkeeper coach

=== Front Office Staff ===
Name	Position
(United States) Amanda Powers	President
(United States) Jon Pearlman	Technical Director
(United States) Kyle Cornell	Director of Soccer Operations

== Competitions ==
=== Friendlies ===
All times from this point on Mountain Standard Time (UTC-07:00)

February 26, 2022 Desert Showcase	FC Tucson	0–1	Oakland Roots SC	Tucson, Arizona
12:00 PM MST		TUC Report	Dennis 20'	Stadium: Kino North Stadium; Attendance: 925; Referee: Laura Chambers Waliski

March 5, 2022 Preseason	Phoenix Rising FC	5–1	FC Tucson	Chandler, Arizona
7:00 PM MST	Hurst 29'; Epps 38', 80', 82'; Quinn 74'	PHX Report	Bedoya 12'	Stadium: Wild Horse Pass Stadium
Note: Closed door scrimmage

March 12, 2022 Preseason	FC Tucson	2–1	Grand Canyon University	Tucson, Arizona
11:00 PM MST	Calixtro 9'; Trialist 35'	TUC Report	PK 89'	Stadium: Kino North Stadium
Note: Closed door scrimmage

March 27, 2022 Preseason	FC Tucson	2–0	Pima Community College	Tucson, Arizona
11:00 PM MST	Allen (?); Calixtro (?)	TUC Report		Stadium: Kino North Stadium
Note: Closed door scrimmage

=== USL League One ===
==== Standings ====
Pos	Team	Pld	W	L	T	GF	GA	GD	Pts
7	Northern Colorado Hailstorm FC	30	11	10	9	42	38	+4	42
8	Central Valley Fuego FC	30	11	12	7	37	40	−3	40
9	Forward Madison FC	30	7	11	12	34	44	−10	33
10	FC Tucson	30	8	14	8	34	44	−10	32
11	North Carolina FC	30	8	16	6	35	53	−18	30

Source: USL League One
Rules for classification: 1) points; 2) total wins; 3) total goal differential; 4) total goals scored; 5) points earned against top four Conference finishers; 6) disciplinary points; 7) drawing of lots.

=== Results summary ===
Overall								Home						Away					
Pld	W	D	L	GF	GA	GD	Pts	W	D	L	GF	GA	GD	W	D	L	GF	GA	GD
30	8	8	14	34	44	−10	32	4	4	7	15	18	−3	4	4	7	19	26	−7

Source: USL League One

Round	1	2	3	4	5	6	7	8	9	10	11	12	13	14	15	16	17	18	19	20	21	22	23	24	25	26	27	28	29	30
Stadium	A	H	A	H	H	A	A	A	H	A	A	H	H	H	A	H	A	A	H	A	A	H	H	A	H	H	A	H	A	H
Result	L	D	W	L	L	L	W	L	L	D	W	L	D	D	L	L	L	W	L	D	L	W	W	D	W	W	D	L	L	D
Position	11	11	8	10	11	11	9	11	11	11	11	11	11	11	11	11	11	11	11	11	11	11	10	10	10	10	10	10	10	10

Source: USL League One
A = Away; H = Home; W = Win; D = Draw; L = Loss

==== Match results ====
April 2, 2022 1	Richmond Kickers	4–0	FC Tucson	Richmond, Virginia
5:30 PM MST	Terzaghi 18'; Aune (yellow card) 23'; Vinyals 34', 60' (yellow card) 58'; Payne (yellow card) 55'; Barnathan (yellow card) 68'; Bentley 81'; Olsen (yellow card) 90+2'	TUC Report; RIC Report	Sunday (yellow card) 21'; Fahling (yellow card) 62'; T. Allen (yellow card) 66'; Moss (red card) 85'	Stadium: City Stadium; Attendance: 4,054; Referee: Danielle Chesky

April 16, 2022 2	FC Tucson	1–1	Forward Madison FC	Tucson, Arizona
7:00 PM MST	L. Perez (yellow card) 67'; Crull 81' (yellow card) 83'; Corfe (yellow card) 90+3'	TUC Report; MAD Report	Bartman (yellow card) 10'; Rad (yellow card) 35' (red card) 63'; Enriquez 54'; Wheeler-Omiunu (yellow card) 88'; Maldonado (yellow card) 90+2'	Stadium: Kino Sports Complex; Attendance: 1,482; Referee: Corbyn May

April 23, 2022 3	Chattanooga Red Wolves	2–3	FC Tucson	East Ridge, Tennessee
4:30 PM MST	Villalobos 26'; Mentzingen 62'; Luna (yellow card) 90'	TUC Report	Fahling (yellow card) 19'; Mastrantonio 55'; L. Perez 71'; Bedoya 90+1' (pen.)	Stadium: CHI Memorial Stadium; Attendance: 2,654; Referee: Kyle Johnston

April 30, 2022 4	FC Tucson	0–2	Tormenta FC	Tucson, Arizona
7:00 PM MST	Machell (yellow card) 5'; L. Perez (yellow card) 29' (red card) 62'; Fox (yellow card) 77'	TUC Report; TRM Report	Billhardt 61'; Phelps (yellow card) 77'; Bosua (yellow card) 81'; Sharifi 84'	Stadium: Kino Sports Complex; Attendance: 1,026; Referee: Adam Zarrin

May 7, 2022 5	FC Tucson	1–2	North Carolina FC	Tucson, Arizona
7:00 PM MST	Mastrantonio (yellow card) 8'; Corfe 9'; Fahling (yellow card) 35'; Crull (yellow card) 49'; Bedoya (yellow card) 86'	TUC Report; NCA Report	Servania (yellow card) 45+3' (goal) 68'; Anderson 90+2' (pen.)	Stadium: Kino Sports Complex; Attendance: 908; Referee: Killian Richardson

May 15, 2022 6	Charlotte Independence	2–1	FC Tucson	Charlotte, North Carolina
3:00 PM MST	Mbuyu 18' (yellow card) 86'; Santos 43' (yellow card) 57' (red card) 65'; Zendejas (yellow card) 79'	TUC Report; CLT Report	T. Allen (yellow card) 31'; Moss 38'	Stadium: American Legion Memorial Stadium; Attendance: 3,702; Referee: Matthew Corrigan

May 28, 2022 7	Tormenta FC	0–1	FC Tucson	Statesboro, Georgia
4:30 PM MST	Sharifi (yellow card) 30'; Morrell (yellow card) 69'	TUC Report; TRM Report	Shaw (yellow card) 4' (red card) 38'; T. Allen 36'; Machell (yellow card) 54'	Stadium: Eagle Field; Attendance: 928; Referee: Laura Chambers Waliski

June 4, 2022 8	Forward Madison FC	2–1	FC Tucson	Madison, Wisconsin
3:00 PM MST	Osmond (yellow card) 19'; Bartman 29'; Thiam 50' (yellow card) 69'; Conner (yellow card) 63'; Wheeler-Omiunu (yellow card) 65'	TUC Report; MAD Report	Fahling (yellow card) 14'; Moss (yellow card) 20'; T. Allen (yellow card) 28'; Machell 41'; F. Pérez (yellow card) 52'; Bedoya (yellow card) 83'; L. Perez (yellow card) 87'	Stadium: Breese Stevens Field; Referee: Wes Caouette

June 11, 2022 9	FC Tucson	1–2	Union Omaha	Tucson, Arizona
7:00 PM MST	F. Pérez (yellow card) 69'; Doyle 73' (o.g.); Fahling (yellow card) 90+2'	TUC Report; OMA Report	Meza 42'; Claudio (yellow card) 51' (red card) 63'; Malcolm 57'	Stadium: Kino Sports Complex; Attendance: 1,355; Referee: Dejan Susak

June 18, 2022 10	Central Valley Fuego FC	0–0	FC Tucson	Fresno, California
7:30 PM MST	Ramos (yellow card) 21'; Dieye (yellow card) 48'; Schenfeld (yellow card) 56'; Chaney (yellow card) 90+3'	TUC Report	Fahling (yellow card) 65'; Bedoya (yellow card) 73'; Shaw (yellow card) 78'	Stadium: Fresno State Soccer Stadium; Referee: Joseph Salinas

June 25, 2022 11	Chattanooga Red Wolves	1–2	FC Tucson	East Ridge, Tennessee
4:30 PM MST	España (yellow card) 57'; Mentzingen (yellow card) 81'; Galindrez 90'	Report	L. Perez 45+2'; Allen (yellow card) 56'; Fahling (yellow card) 67'; Garcia 75'; Shaw (yellow card) 87'	Stadium: CHI Memorial Stadium; Attendance: 2,213; Referee: DeShun Beard

June 29, 2022 12	FC Tucson	0–1	Richmond Kickers	Tucson, Arizona
7:00 PM MST	Weir (yellow card) 45+2'	Report	Terzaghi (yellow card) 25'; Bolanos 60'	Stadium: Kino Sports Complex; Attendance: 1,688; Referee: Cristian Campo Hernández
Note: Postponed on May 20 by Richmond due to COVID-19 concerns.

July 3, 2022 13	FC Tucson	1–1	Greenville Triumph SC	Tucson, Arizona
7:00 PM MST	Shaw (yellow card) 26'; Toia (yellow card) 71' (goal) 84'; Fox (yellow card) 78'	TUC Report; GVL Report	Coutinho 43'; Smart (yellow card) 63'; Fricke (yellow card) 71'	Stadium: Kino Sports Complex; Attendance: 1,785; Referee: Killian Richardson

July 9, 2022 14	FC Tucson	1–1	Northern Colorado Hailstorm FC	Tucson, Arizona
7:00 PM MST	Toia (yellow card) 10' (yellow-red card) 60', (goal) 45'; Garcia (yellow card) 72'	Report	Cornwall (yellow card) 75'; McLean 76'	Stadium: Kino Sports Complex; Attendance: 983; Referee: Karen Callado

July 16, 2022 15	Union Omaha	2–1	FC Tucson	Papillion, Nebraska
5:00 PM MST	Kametani 14'; Scearce (yellow card) 23' (red card) 30'; Touche (yellow card) 27'; Knutson (yellow card) 54'; Nuhu (yellow card) 55'; Jiba (yellow card) 55'; Bawa (yellow card) 90'; Bruce 90+1'	TUC Report; OMA Report	Fox (yellow card) 25'; F. Perez (yellow card) 53' (red card) 61'; Garcia (yellow card) 54'; Crull 68'; Shibata (yellow card) 84'	Stadium: Werner Park; Attendance: 4,004; Referee: Laura Chambers

July 23, 2022 16	FC Tucson	2–3	Charlotte Independence	Tucson, Arizona
7:00 PM MST	Toia 11' (yellow card) 58'; Fox 19'; Fahling (yellow card) 42'	TUC Report; CLT Report	Ciss 4'; Santos (yellow card) 24'; Mbuyu 37'; Dimick (yellow card) 72'; Hegardt 83'	Stadium: Kino Sports Complex; Attendance: 1,096; Referee: Adorae Monroy

August 6, 2022 17	Richmond Kickers	3–1	FC Tucson	Richmond, Virginia
5:20 PM MST	Morán (yellow card) 26'; Vanacore-Decker 45'; Terzaghi 56', 64'	TUC Report; RIC Report	Machell (yellow card) 20'; Calixtro 28'; Garcia (red card) 76'	Stadium: City Stadium; Attendance: 3,170; Referee: John Matto

August 17, 2022 18	Northern Colorado Hailstorm FC	1–2	FC Tucson	Severance, Colorado
7:00 PM MST	McFaul (yellow card) 12'; Rogers (yellow card) 73'; McLean 80'	TUC Report; NCO Report	Delgado (yellow card) 10'; F. Pérez 14' (yellow card) 33'; Shaw (yellow card) 24'; Kinzner (yellow card) 37'; L. Perez (yellow card) 40' (goal) 70'	Stadium: Severance High School; Attendance: 301; Referee: Adam Rice

August 20, 2022 19	FC Tucson	0–1	Greenville Triumph SC	Tucson, Arizona
7:00 PM MST	Weir (yellow card) 82'; Crull (yellow card) 90+2'	TUC Report; GVL Report	Waldeck (yellow card) 44'; Walker 47'; Brown (yellow card) 81'	Stadium: Kino Sports Complex; Attendance: 1,293; Referee: Dejan Susak

August 27, 2022 20	North Carolina FC	1–1	FC Tucson	Cary, North Carolina
4:00 PM MST	Tahir 18'; Servania (yellow card) 32'; Adame (yellow card) 77'; Young (yellow card) 78'	TUC Report; NCA Report	Mastrantonio (yellow card) 47'; Delgado (yellow card) 54'; Perez 81'	Stadium: WakeMed Soccer Park; Attendance: 1,756; Referee: Josiah Parke

August 31, 2022 21	Central Valley Fuego FC	3–2	FC Tucson	Fresno, California
7:30PM PDT	Chaney 34' (yellow card) 45+3'; Dieye 52'; Falck (yellow card) 57' (goal) 75'; Dabo (yellow card) 78'	TUC Report; Soccerway Rpt	F. Pérez 16' (yellow card) 81'; Toia 25'; Sunday (red card) 40'; Fahling (yellow card) 45' (red card) 90+1'; L. Perez (yellow card) 77'	Stadium: Fresno State Soccer Stadium; Attendance: 826; Referee: Adrian Gonzalez

September 3, 2022 22	FC Tucson	1–0	Charlotte Independence	Tucson, Arizona
7:00 PM MST	Calixtro (yellow card) 29'; Garcia 39'	TUC Report; CLT Report	Hegardt (yellow card) 80'; Shevtsov (yellow card) 90+4'	Stadium: Kino Sports Complex; Attendance: 1,187; Referee: Corbyn May

September 11, 2022 23	FC Tucson	3–0	Union Omaha	Tucson, Arizona
7:00 PM MST	Weir 1' (yellow card) 6'; Fahling (yellow card) 58'; Bedoya 62'; Toia 76'		Rivera (yellow card) 43'	Stadium: Kino Sports Complex; Attendance: 0 Referee: Lorenzo Hernandez
Note: No attendance due to weather delay.

September 16, 2022 24	Tormenta FC	1–1	FC Tucson	Statesboro, Georgia
2:30 PM MST	Sierakowski (yellow card) 28'; Akale (yellow card) 68' (goal) 76'; Heckenberg (yellow card) 90+7'	TRM Report; TUC Report	Pérez (yellow card) 56'; Sunday (yellow card) 74'; Garcia 90+1'; Kinzner (yellow card) 90+5'	Stadium: Eagle Field; Attendance: 1,021; Referee: Izlen Peksenar

September 20, 2022 25	FC Tucson	1–0	North Carolina FC	Tucson, Arizona
7:00 PM MST	Mastrantonio (yellow card) 21'; L. Perez 66' (pen.)	TUC Report; NCA Report	Somersall (yellow card) 44'; McLaughlin (yellow card) 48'; Arriaga (yellow card) 62'; Young (yellow card) 68'	Stadium: Kino Sports Complex; Attendance: 855; Referee: Shay Yinka-Kehinde
Note: Match postponed from July 30 due to travel and weather-related issues.

September 24, 2022 26	FC Tucson	2–1	Chattanooga Red Wolves	Tucson, Arizona
7:00 PM MST	Bedoya 30' (pen.); Mastrantonio (yellow card) 34'; Fox 48'	TUC Report; CHT Report; Soccerway Rpt	Mentzingen (yellow card) 16'; Espinoza 35' (pen.); Villalobos (yellow card) 52'; Benton (yellow card) 60' (red card) 67'; Gutiérrez (yellow card) 81'; Ortiz (yellow card) 84'; Cardona (yellow card) 90+4'	Stadium: Kino Sports Complex; Attendance: 1,316; Referee: Brandon Stevis

October 1, 2022 27	Greenville Triumph SC	2–2	FC Tucson	Greenville, South Carolina
	Cox-Ashwood 36'; Fricke (yellow card) 59'; Evans 75'; Brown (yellow card) 89'; Ibarra (yellow card) 90+1'	GVL Report; TUC Report	Calixtro (yellow card) 18'; Fricke 20' (o.g.); Perez (yellow card) 51'; Mastrantonio (yellow card) 61'; Garcia 88'; Kinzner (yellow card) 90'	Stadium: Legacy Early College Field; Referee: Jervis Atagana

October 5, 2022 28	FC Tucson	0–2	Central Valley Fuego FC	Tucson, Arizona
7:00 PM MST	Mastrantonio (yellow card) 12'	TUC Report	Villarreal (yellow card) 13'; Chaney (yellow card) 43' (goal) 68'; Casillas (yellow card) 45+2'; Vazquez 50'; Smith (yellow card) 70'	Stadium: Kino Sports Complex; Referee: DeShun Beard

October 8, 2022 29	Northern Colorado Hailstorm FC	2–1	FC Tucson	Severance, Colorado
5:00 PM MST	Prentice 11'; Norman (yellow card) 44' (goal) 76'; Peñaranda (red card) 45+1'; Nortey (yellow card) 68'	TUC Report; NCO Report	Mastrantonio 45+5'; F. Pérez (yellow card) 67'; Machell (yellow card) 80'; Shaw (yellow card) 83'; Crull (yellow card) 88'	Stadium: Severance High School; Referee: Jeremy Scheer

October 15, 2022 30	FC Tucson	1–1	Forward Madison FC	Tucson, Arizona
7:00 PM MST	Machell (yellow card) 45+1'; Delgado 46'; Perez (yellow card) 90+3'	TUC Report	Cassini 28'; Maldonado (yellow card) 51'; Arozarena (yellow card) 60'; Osmond (yellow card) 80'	Stadium: Kino Sports Complex; Attendance: 1,388; Referee: Kelsey Harms

=== U.S. Open Cup ===
As a member of the USL League One, FC Tucson entered the tournament proper in the Second Round. This was their first appearance in the Open Cup since 2018.

April 6, 2022 Second Round	FC Tucson	3–2	Las Vegas Lights FC	Tucson, Arizona
6:30pm MST	Crull 45'; Fahling (yellow card) 56'; Bedoya 71'; Allen 77'; Shaw (yellow card) 88'; Sunday (yellow card) 90'	TUC Report	Traore (yellow card) 63' (goal) 65'; Molina (yellow card) 77'; Crisostomo 80'	Stadium: Kino Sports Complex; Referee: Benjamin Davis

April 19, 2022 Third Round	FC Tucson	1–2	California United Strikers FC	Tucson, Arizona
7:30pm MST	Calixtro 17'	TUC Report; ESPN Report	Kurtz (yellow card) 45+2'; Nuño 71'; Kawashima 90+2'	Stadium: Kino Sports Complex; Attendance: 528; Referee: Dejan Susak

== Statistics ==
#	Pos.	Name	GP	GS	Min.	Goals	Assists	A yellow rectangle, denoting the yellow penalty card shown to a player being cautioned	A red rectangle, denoting the red penalty card shown to a player being sent off
13	MF	(France) Louis Perez	26	25	2067	5	7	7	1
2	DF	(United States) Donny Toia	18	15	1347	5	1	2	1
14	FW	(United States) Fernando Garcia	18	7	688	4	0	2	1
8	MF	(Colombia) Daniel Bedoya	24	14	1281	3	1	4	0
4	DF	(Italy) Luca Mastrantonio	30	30	2700	2	0	6	0
16	DF	(United States) Jake Crull	30	28	2545	2	1	4	0
5	DF	(United States) Kaelon Fox	26	24	2154	2	1	3	0
29	FW	(Argentina) Franco Pérez	17	13	894	2	2	6	1
17	DF	(United States) Tarn Weir	25	19	1760	1	1	3	0
12	DF	(United States) Tyler Allen	24	18	1624	1	3	4	0
25	MF	(England) Charlie Machell	22	17	1445	1	1	5	0
11	FW	(United States) Gio Calixtro	24	14	1309	1	1	2	0
22	DF	(United States) Tyler Moss	15	10	967	1	0	1	1
10	FW	(England) Deri Corfe	9	6	576	1	0	1	0
7	MF	(Portugal) João Delgado	10	5	443	1	0	2	0
32	MF	(United States) Burke Fahling	27	20	1805	0	2	9	1
18	MF	(Jamaica) Tevin Shaw	18	11	966	0	0	5	1
27	DF	(United States) Eric Kinzner	12	10	864	0	0	3	0
21	MF	(Nigeria) Mueng Sunday	17	6	542	0	0	3	1
9	FW	(Japan) Yuki Shibata	8	4	363	0	0	1	0
6	MF	(United States) Elijah Wynder	12	2	265	0	1	0	0
20	FW	(Ghana) Daniel Bloyou	4	1	99	0	0	0	0
11	MF	(United States) Kevin Rodriguez	1	1	67	0	0	0	0
77	FW	(United States) Josiah Romero	2	0	14	0	0	0	0
19	MF	(United States) Christian Nydegger	1	0	6	0	0	0	0

- One Own Goal scored by Greenville Triumph SC and Union Omaha.

=== Goalkeepers ===
#	Name	GP	GS	Min.	SV	GA	GAA	SO	A yellow rectangle, denoting the yellow penalty card shown to a player being cautioned	A red rectangle, denoting the red penalty card shown to a player being sent off
23	(Mexico) Carlos Merancio	29	29	2610	84	42	1.448	5	0	0
1	(United States) Sean Murray	1	1	90	4	2	2.000	0	0	0
