= 2022 Northern Colorado Hailstorm FC season =

Northern Colorado Hailstorm FC
2022 season
- Owner: Jeff and Casey Katofsky; Ryan Spilborghs
- Head coach: Éamon Zayed
- Stadium: Future Legends Complex
- USL1 Playoffs: DNQ
- U.S. Open Cup: Round of 32
- Highest home attendance: 813 (6/11 v. TRM)
- Lowest home attendance: 300 (8/6 v. TRM)
- Average home league attendance: 552
- Biggest win: NCO 4–1 CV (6/22); NCO 4–1 NC (9/3)
- Biggest defeat: CHA 4–1 NCO (5/7)
Home colors	Away colors

The 2022 Northern Colorado Hailstorm FC season was the first season in the club's history. The club, which was announced on January 12, 2021, played in USL League One, a third division league in the American soccer pyramid. The club played their home games at Future Legends Complex, a sports park currently under construction in Windsor, Colorado. In August 2021, the club announced that former Libya international Éamon Zayed will manage the club in its first season.

== Club ==
=== Roster ===
As of April 21, 2022

No.	Pos.	Nation	Player
1	GK	USA	Thomas Olsen
2	DF	USA	Brecc Evans
4	DF	IRL	Rob Cornwall
5	DF	USA	Leo Folla
6	MF	IRL	Shane McFaul
7	FW	USA	Ethan Vanacore-Decker
8	MF	ENG	Nortei Nortey
9	FW	AUS	Lachlan McLean
10	FW	USA	Irvin Parra
11	MF	USA	Marky Hernández
12	DF	HAI	Denso Ulysse
14	MF	ENG	Arthur Rogers
16	MF	USA	Destan Norman
17	MF	USA	Danny Robles
18	GK	USA	Danny Faundez (on loan from Louisville City)
19	MF	HAI	Jerry Desdunes
20	MF	USA	Ciaran Winters (on loan from FC Tulsa)
21	GK	USA	Johan Peñaranda
22	MF	SRB	Stefan Lukic
27	MF	SCO	Daniel Scally
29	FW	USA	Trevor Amann
31	MF	USA	Owen Damm (on loan from Louisville City)

== Competitions ==
=== Exhibitions ===
February 26, 2022 Preseason 1	Colorado Springs Switchbacks	7–2	Hailstorm FC	Colorado Springs, Colorado
3:00 PM MST		Report		Stadium: Weidner Field

March 5, 2022 Preseason 2	New Mexico United	2–2	Hailstorm FC	Albuquerque, New Mexico
12:00 PM MST		Report		Stadium: Mesa del Sol Training Facility

March 18, 2022 Preseason 3	Peak XI	1–4	Hailstorm FC	Lafayette, Colorado
7:30 PM MDT	61'	Report	McLean 3'; Vanacore-Decker 33'; Trialist 48'; Hernández 77'	Stadium: Centaurus High School
Note: Match was a fundraiser for victims of the Marshall Fire.

March 20, 2022 Preseason 4	Hailstorm FC	v	Colorado Rapids 2	Greeley, Colorado
3:00 PM MDT				Stadium: Jackson Stadium

March 25, 2022 Preseason 5	Hailstorm FC	v	Regis University	Greeley, Colorado
TBD				Stadium: Jackson Stadium

March 29, 2022 Preseason 6	Harpos FC	v	Hailstorm FC	TBD
TBD				Stadium: TBD

=== USL League One ===
==== Standings ====
Pos	Team	Pld	W	L	T	GF	GA	GD	Pts	Qualification
5	Union Omaha	30	10	7	13	34	33	+1	43	Qualification for the play-offs
6	Charlotte Independence	30	12	12	6	48	48	0	42	Qualification for the play-offs
7	Northern Colorado Hailstorm FC	30	11	10	9	42	38	+4	42	
8	Central Valley Fuego FC	30	11	12	7	37	40	−3	40	
9	Forward Madison FC	30	7	11	12	34	44	−10	33	

Source: USL League One
Rules for classification: 1) points; 2) total wins; 3) total goal differential; 4) total goals scored; 5) points earned against top four Conference finishers; 6) disciplinary points; 7) drawing of lots.

==== Match results ====
April 9, 2022 1	Richmond Kickers	1–1	Hailstorm FC	Richmond, Virginia
4:30 PM MDT	Morán (yellow card) 11'; Aune (yellow card) 51'; Terzaghi 55', (yellow card) 78'; Bolduc (yellow card) 62'	Report	Damm (yellow card) 16'; Folla (yellow card) 23'; Vanacore-Decker 37'; Ulysse (yellow card) 59'; Desdunes (yellow card) 88'	Stadium: City Stadium; Attendance: 2,771; Referee: Matthew Franz

April 16, 2022 2	Charlotte Independence	2–1	Hailstorm FC	Charlotte, North Carolina
5:00 PM MDT	Ibarra 14'; Mbuyu (yellow card) 33', (goal) 90+1'; Talboys (yellow card) 47'	Report	Parra 6' (pen.); McLean (yellow card) 31'; Rogers (yellow card) 37'; Nortey (yellow card) 78'; Lukic (yellow card) 82'	Stadium: American Legion Memorial Stadium; Attendance: 2,416; Referee: Kevin Broadley

April 30, 2022 3	North Carolina FC	1–2	Hailstorm FC	Charlotte, North Carolina
5:00 PM MDT	Flick (yellow card) 17'; Anderson 23'; Fernandes (yellow card) 81'; Pecka (yellow card) 88'; Young (yellow card) 88'	Report	Parra 18'; Ulysse (yellow card) 36'; Nortey (yellow card) 51'; Rogers (yellow card) 65'; Robles 80'; Hernández (yellow card) 89'; Scally (yellow card) 90+2'; Cornwall (yellow card) 90+5'	Stadium: American Legion Memorial Stadium; Attendance: 1,723; Referee: William Steffen

May 7, 2022 4	Chattanooga Red Wolves	4–1	Hailstorm FC	East Ridge, Tennessee
5:30 PM MDT	Luna (yellow card) 10'; Texeira 26', 51', (yellow card) 55'; Benton 45'; Carrera-García 60'; Villalobos (yellow card) 62'; Cardona (yellow card) 77'; España (yellow card) 85'; Capozucchi (yellow card) 86'; Ortiz (yellow card) 90+4'	Report	Lukic 8'; Norman (yellow card) 22'; Rogers (yellow card) 59'; Parra (yellow card) 79'	Stadium: CHI Memorial Stadium; Attendance: 1,807; Referee: Aleksandar Zhelyazkov

May 18, 2022 5	Charlotte Independence	1–2	Hailstorm FC	Charlotte, North Carolina
5:30 PM MDT	Mbuyu 19'; Barber (yellow card) 64'	Report	Parra 2'; Amann (yellow card) 45', (goal) 70'; Nortey (yellow card) 59'; Hernández (yellow card) 72'; Robles (yellow card) 77'; Ulysse (yellow card) 89'; Scally (yellow card) 90+10'	Stadium: American Legion Memorial Stadium; Attendance: 1,798; Referee: Izlen Peksenar

May 28, 2022 6	Union Omaha	0–0	Hailstorm FC	Papillion, Nebraska
6:00 PM MDT	Claudio (yellow card) 53'	Report	Evans (yellow card) 50'; Hernández (yellow card) 57'; Scally (yellow card) 76'; Peñaranda (yellow card) 88'; Parra (yellow card) 90+4'	Stadium: Werner Park; Attendance: 3,432; Referee: Lorenzo Hernandez

June 8, 2022 7	Hailstorm FC	1–1	North Carolina FC	Greeley, Colorado
7:00 PM MDT	Parra 37', (yellow card) 81'; Ulysse (yellow card) 39'; Rogers (yellow card) 45'; Cornwall (yellow card) 51'; Scally (yellow card) 84'	Report	Tahir 16'; Young (yellow card) 22'; Martinez (yellow card) 28'	Stadium: Jackson Stadium; Attendance: 516; Referee: Dejan Susak

June 11, 2022 8	Hailstorm FC	1–1	Tormenta FC	Greeley, Colorado
7:00 PM MDT	Robles (yellow card) 40'; Folla (yellow card) 78'; Lukic (yellow card) 90'; Nortey 90+9'	USL Report; Soccerway Report	Adjei 54'; Thorn (yellow card) 86'; Phelps (yellow card) 90+11' (yellow-red card) 90+11'	Stadium: Jackson Stadium; Attendance: 813; Referee: Cristian Campos

June 18, 2022 9	Richmond Kickers	3–2	Hailstorm FC	Richmond, Virginia
4:30 PM MDT	Vinyals (yellow card) 33', (goal) 42'; Bentley (yellow card) 43'; Terzaghi 45+2'; Bolanos 76'; Fitzgerald (yellow card) 90+4'	Report	Vanacore-Decker (yellow card) 25'; Norman (yellow card) 27' (yellow-red card) 29'; Cornwall (yellow card) 52', (goal) 68'; Folla (yellow card) 74', (goal) 88'	Stadium: City Stadium; Attendance: 3,099; Referee: Amiel Aleman

June 22, 2022 10	Hailstorm FC	4–1	Fuego FC	Greeley, Colorado
7:00 PM MDT	McLean 21'; Amann 41'; Parra (yellow card) 50', (goal) 74'; Hernández 77'	Report	Casillas 7'; Gillingham (yellow card) 45+2'; Dieye (yellow card) 83'; Smith (yellow card) 90+6' (yellow-red card) 90+7'	Stadium: Jackson Stadium; Referee: Joshua Belzer

June 25, 2022 11	Greenville Triumph	2–1	Hailstorm FC	Greenville, South Carolina
5:00 PM MDT	Lee (yellow card) 44'; Smart 54' (pen.); Ibarra 66'; Evans (yellow card) 69'; Walker (yellow card) 80'	Report	Parra 57'; Robles (yellow card) 61'	Stadium: Legacy Early College Field; Referee: Katherine McCormick

June 30, 2022 12	Hailstorm FC	2–1	Chattanooga Red Wolves	Greeley, Colorado
7:00 PM MDT	Robles 20'; Parra (yellow card) 25'; Evans 34'; Amann (yellow card) 44'	Report	Benton (yellow card) 19'; España (yellow card) 27'; Galindrez 61'; Capozucchi (yellow card) 63'; Ortiz (yellow card) 90'	Stadium: Jackson Stadium; Referee: Samantha Martinez

July 5, 2022 13	Hailstorm FC	1–2	Forward Madison	Fort Collins, Colorado
7:00 PM MDT	Desdunes 28'; Parra (yellow card) 45+4'; Cornwall (yellow card) 46'; Folla (yellow card) 58'; Nortey (yellow card) 85'	Report	Wheeler-Omiunu 8'; Maldonado (yellow card) 18'; Jones (yellow card) 24'; Torres 44'; Cassini (yellow card) 79'; Osmond (yellow card) 90+6'	Stadium: Canvas Stadium; Attendance: 683; Referee: Adam Zarrin

July 9, 2022 14	FC Tucson	1–1	Hailstorm FC	Tucson, Arizona
7:00 PM MDT	Toia (yellow card) 10' (yellow-red card) 60', (goal) 45'; Garcia (yellow card) 72'	Report	Cornwall (yellow card) 75'; McLean 76'	Stadium: Kino Sports Complex; Attendance: 1,785; Referee: Killian Richardson

July 13, 2022 15	Hailstorm FC	0–1	Fuego FC	Fort Collins, Colorado
7:00 PM MDT	Folla (yellow card) 37'; Lukic (yellow card) 65' (yellow-red card) 90'; Nortey (yellow card) 90'; Cornwall (yellow card) 90+4'	Report	Ramos (yellow card) 26'; Torralva (yellow card) 32'; Partida (yellow card) 54'; Chaney (yellow card) 87', (goal) 90+2'	Stadium: Canvas Stadium; Attendance: 596; Referee: Esad Omanovic

July 17, 2022 16	Hailstorm FC	3–1	Charlotte Independence	Fort Collins, Colorado
4:00 PM MDT	Parra 14' (pen.), (yellow card) 45+1'; Nortey 21'; Norman (yellow card) 28'; Hernández 34', (yellow card) 48'; Olsen (yellow card) 60' (yellow-red card) 63'	Report	Santos (yellow card) 12'; Zendejas (yellow card) 22'; Dutey (yellow card) 30'; Maya (yellow card) 38'; Hegardt (yellow card) 42'; Bennett 67' (pen.); Ciss (yellow card) 83'	Stadium: Canvas Stadium; Attendance: 611; Referee: Killian Richardson

July 23, 2022 17	Chattanooga Red Wolves	0–0	Hailstorm FC	East Ridge, Tennessee
5:30 PM MDT	Benton (yellow card) 30'; Cardona (yellow card) 82'; Ortiz (yellow card) 89'	Report	McLean (yellow card) 59'; Desdunes (yellow card) 80'; Hernández (yellow card) 90+5'	Stadium: CHI Memorial Stadium; Attendance: 2,456; Referee: John Matto

July 30, 2022 18	Forward Madison	1–1	Hailstorm FC	Madison, Wisconsin
6:00 PM MDT	Streng (yellow card) 4'; Cassini (yellow card) 57'; R. Smith 63'	Report	Parra 29'; Scally (yellow card) 58'; Damm (yellow card) 85'; Norman (yellow card) 89'	Stadium: Breese Stevens Field; Attendance: 4,759; Referee: Kevin Fikar

August 2, 2022 19	Hailstorm FC	0–1	Richmond Kickers	Severance, Colorado
7:00 PM MDT	Damm (yellow card) 28'; Rogers (yellow card) 39'; Nortey (yellow card) 63'	Report	Terzaghi 32', (yellow card) 47'; Vinyals (yellow card) 85'; Fitzgerald (yellow card) 90'	Stadium: Severance High School; Attendance: 346; Referee: Robert Vincze

August 6, 2022 20	Hailstorm FC	2–0	Tormenta FC	Severance, Colorado
7:00 PM MDT	Amann (yellow card) 27'; Rogers 60'; Evans 82'; Dietrich (yellow card) 86'; Nortey (yellow card) 87'; Peñaranda (yellow card) 90+6'	Report	Green (yellow card) 15'; Phelps (yellow card) 54'; Nembhard (yellow card) 69'	Stadium: Severance High School; Attendance: 300; Referee: Adorae Monroy

August 13, 2022 21	Union Omaha	1–1	Hailstorm FC	Papillion, Nebraska
6:00 PM MDT	Meza 12'; Gordon (yellow card) 90+4'	Report	Robles (yellow card) 37'; Dietrich (yellow card) 42'; Parra (yellow card) 75', (goal) 79'	Stadium: Werner Park; Attendance: 4,312; Referee: DeShun Beard

August 17, 2022 22	Hailstorm FC	1–2	FC Tucson	Severance, Colorado
7:00 PM MDT	McFaul (yellow card) 12'; Rogers (yellow card) 73'; McLean 80'	Report	Delgado (yellow card) 10'; F. Pérez 14', (yellow card) 33'; Shaw (yellow card) 24'; Kinzner (yellow card) 37'; L. Perez (yellow card) 40', (goal) 70'	Stadium: Severance High School; Attendance: 301; Referee: Adam Rice

August 20, 2022 23	Hailstorm FC	1–3	Forward Madison	Severance, Colorado
7:00 PM MDT	Parra 14' (pen.), (yellow card) 45+2'; Folla (red card) 38'; Desdunes (yellow card) 51'; Prentice (yellow card) 80'; Amann (red card) 83'; Cornwall (red card) 87'; Norman (yellow card) 89'	Report	Osmond (yellow card) 13'; Torres (yellow card) 21'; Gebhard 29'; Streng 65'. 82'; Cassini (yellow card) 71'	Stadium: Severance High School; Attendance: 585; Referee: Jervis Atagana

August 27, 2022 24	Greenville Triumph	0–2	Hailstorm FC	Greenville, South Carolina
5:00 PM MDT		Report	Parra 60', (yellow card) 62'; Desdunes 72'	Stadium: Legacy Early College Field; Attendance: 3,097; Referee: Joshua Encarnación

September 3, 2022 25	Hailstorm FC	4–1	North Carolina FC	Severance, Colorado
7:00 PM MDT	Cornwall (yellow card) 7'; McLean 15'; Amann 31', 45+4', (yellow card) 74', (goal) 79' (pen.); Desdunes (yellow card) 34'; Robles (yellow card) 51'; Rogers (yellow card) 60'	Report	Fernandes (yellow card) 32'; Sommersall (yellow card) 47'; Skelton (yellow card) 50'; McLaughlin 83' (pen.)	Stadium: Severance High School; Referee: Dejan Susak

September 10, 2022 26	Tormenta FC	3–1	Hailstorm FC	Statesboro, Georgia
5:30 PM MDT	Sterling 3', 41', 76' (pen.); Adjei (yellow card) 35'; Billhardt (yellow card) 44'; Sharifi (yellow card) 89'	Report	Desdunes 28'; Prentice (yellow card) 54'	Stadium: Optim Health Systems Field; Referee: Joshua Belk

September 21, 2022 27	Hailstorm FC	2–1	Union Omaha	Severance, Colorado
7:00 PM MDT	Evans 24', 84'; Dietrich (yellow card) 42'; Parra (yellow card) 57'; Olsen (yellow card) 72'	Report	Malcolm (yellow card) 40'; Hertzog (yellow card) 41'; Scearce (yellow card) 59'; Meza 75' (pen.)	Stadium: Severance High School; Referee: Corbyn May

September 24, 2022 28	Hailstorm FC	1–1	Greenville Triumph	Severance, Colorado
7:00 PM MDT	Lukic 73'; Parra (yellow card) 85'	Report	Pearson (yellow card) 14' (yellow-red card) 40'; Lee (yellow card) 80', (goal) 90+1'; Labovitz (yellow card) 82'	Stadium: Severance High School; Referee: Katja Koroleva

October 1, 2022 29	Fuego FC	0–1	Hailstorm FC	Fresno, California
8:30 PM MDT	Dieye (yellow card) 10'; Falck (yellow card) 58'; Schenfeld (yellow card) 72'; Dabo (yellow card) 86'; Smith (yellow card) 90+7'	Report	Amann (yellow card) 14'; Dullysse 62' (o.g.); Cornwall (yellow card) 58'; Hernández (yellow card) 71'	Stadium: Fresno State Soccer Stadium; Referee: Brandon Stevis

October 8, 2022 30	Hailstorm FC	2–1	FC Tucson	Severance, Colorado
7:00 PM MDT	Prentice 11'; Norman (yellow card) 44', (goal) 76'; Peñaranda (red card) 45+1'; Nortey (yellow card) 68'	Report	Mastrantonio 45+5'; F. Pérez (yellow card) 67'; Machell (yellow card) 80'; Shaw (yellow card) 83'; Crull (yellow card) 88'	Stadium: Severance High School; Referee: Jeremy Scheer

=== U.S. Open Cup ===
Because of the 2022 USL League One schedule, Northern Colorado played their first-ever competitive match in the Second Round of the Open Cup.

April 6, 2022 Second round	Colorado Springs Switchbacks FC (USLC)	0–1 (a.e.t.)	Northern Colorado Hailstorm FC (USL1)	Colorado Springs, Colorado
7:00 pm MDT	Hodge (yellow card) 90+6' (yellow-red card) 103'	Report	Parra (red card) 27'; Desdunes 96'	Stadium: Weidner Field; Referee: Laura Rodriguez

April 20, 2022 3rd Round	Real Salt Lake (MLS) (Utah)	0–1	Northern Colorado Hailstorm FC (USL1)	Sandy, Utah
7:30 pm MDT	Pierre (yellow card) 69'		Ulysse (yellow card) 25'; Nortey (yellow card) 50'; Evans (yellow card) 53'; Cornwall (yellow card) 58', (goal) 70'; Robles (yellow card) 90+1'; Olsen (yellow card) 90+9'	Stadium: Rio Tinto Stadium; Attendance: 19,301; Referee: Brad Jensen

May 10, 2022 Round of 32	Union Omaha (USL1) (Nebraska)	2–0	Northern Colorado Hailstorm FC (USL1)	Omaha, Nebraska
6:00 pm MDT	Desdunes (yellow card) 1'; Lukic (yellow card) 36'	Report	Bawa (yellow card) 45'; Meza 46'; Doyle 58'; Rivera (yellow card) 83'	Stadium: Al F. Caniglia Field; Attendance: 1,931; Referee: Esad Omanovic
