= 2022 Greenville Triumph SC season =

Greenville Triumph SC
2022 season
- Owner: Joe Erwin; William M. Webster
- Head coach: John Harkes
- Stadium: Legacy Early College Field
- USL1 Playoffs: TBD
- U.S. Open Cup: Third Round
- Top goalscorer: League: Venton Evans (1 goal); All: Jake Keegan (2 goals)
- Highest home attendance: 2,574 vs. TRM (4/23)
- Lowest home attendance: 1,832 vs. CV (7/9)
- Average home league attendance: 2,322
- Biggest win: GVL 2–0 MAD (4/7, USOC) GVL 2–0 MAD (5/13, USLL1); GVL 2–0 CHA (6/4, USLL1); OMA 0–2 GVL (6/18, USLL1); GVL 3–1 NC (6/29, USLL1)
- Biggest defeat: CHA 5–1 GVL (8/6, USLL1)

The 2022 Greenville Triumph SC season was the fourth season in the soccer team's history, all of which they've competed in USL League One, a league in the third division of American soccer. They played their home games at Legacy Early College Field. John Harkes will be managing the club for his fourth season. Greenville finished in 2nd-place the previous season, losing the 2021 final to Union Omaha.

== Club ==
=== Roster ===
As of February 23, 2022

| No. | Pos. | Nation | Player |
|---|---|---|---|
| 2 | DF | USA | Jimmy Filerman |
| 3 | DF | USA | Tyler Polak |
| 7 | MF | USA | Peter Pearson |
| 8 | MF | USA | Aaron Walker |
| 9 | FW | USA | Jake Keegan |
| 10 | MF | JAM | Don Smart |
| 12 | DF | USA | Evan Lee |
| 13 | DF | USA | Noah Franke |
| 15 | DF | USA | Brandon Fricke |
| 19 | MF | JAM | Venton Evans |
| 20 | MF | USA | Noah Pilato |
| 21 | FW | USA | Jesus Ibarra |
| 23 | MF | USA | Allen Gavilanes |
| 30 | GK | USA | Paul Christensen |
| 33 | FW | BRA | Lucas Coutinho |
| 50 | GK | USA | Ben Hale |
| 77 | FW | JAM | Nico Brown |
| — | FW | USA | Selvin Altamirano |
| — | MF | USA | Patrick Cayelli |
| — | FW | USA | Jacob Labovitz |

USL Academy contract

== Competitions ==
=== Exhibitions ===
| February 26, 2022 Preseason 1 | Clemson University | 2–0 | Greenville Triumph | Clemson, South Carolina |
| 3:00 PM EST | | Report | | Stadium: Riggs Field |

| March 5, 2022 Preseason 2 | Atlanta United 2 | 4–2 | Greenville Triumph | Marietta, Georgia |
| 1:00 PM EST | | Report | | Stadium: Atlanta United Training Ground |

| March 12, 2022 Preseason 3 | Greenville Triumph | v | Chattanooga FC | Greenville, South Carolina |
| 4:00 PM EST | | | | Stadium: Legacy Early College Field |
Note: Originally scheduled to be played at Bob Jones University

| March 19, 2022 Preseason 4 | Charlotte Independence | v | Greenville Triumph | Matthews, North Carolina |
| 2:00 PM EDT | | | | Stadium: Sportsplex at Matthews |

=== USL League One ===
==== Standings ====
| Pos | Team | Pld | W | L | T | GF | GA | GD | Pts | Qualification |
|---|---|---|---|---|---|---|---|---|---|---|
| 1 | Richmond Kickers (X) | 30 | 14 | 7 | 9 | 54 | 35 | +19 | 51 | Qualification for the semi-finals |
| 2 | Greenville Triumph SC | 30 | 12 | 8 | 10 | 40 | 38 | +2 | 46 | Qualification for the semi-finals |
| 3 | Tormenta FC (C) | 30 | 12 | 9 | 9 | 42 | 40 | +2 | 45 | Qualification for the play-offs |
| 4 | Chattanooga Red Wolves SC | 30 | 12 | 11 | 7 | 52 | 39 | +13 | 43 | Qualification for the play-offs |
| 5 | Union Omaha | 30 | 10 | 7 | 13 | 34 | 33 | +1 | 43 | Qualification for the play-offs |

Source: USL League One
Rules for classification: 1) points; 2) total wins; 3) total goal differential; 4) total goals scored; 5) points earned against top four Conference finishers; 6) disciplinary points; 7) drawing of lots.
(C) Champions; (X) Regular Season Champion

==== Match results ====
| April 2, 2022 1 | Greenville Triumph | 0–2 | Fuego FC | Greenville, South Carolina |
| 7:00 PM EDT | Smith (yellow card) 13'; Lee (yellow card) 40'; Labovitz (yellow card) 67' | Report | Falck (yellow card) 20'; Chaney 56', 69'; Casillas (yellow card) 80'; Antman (yellow card) 86' | Stadium: Legacy Early College Field; Attendance: 2,561; Referee: William Steffen |

| April 16, 2022 2 | North Carolina FC | 1–1 | Greenville Triumph | Cary, North Carolina |
| 7:00 PM EDT | Servania (yellow card) 31'; McLaughlin 35' | Report | Lee (yellow card) 5' (yellow-red card) 67'; Evans 19' | Stadium: Sahlen's Stadium at WakeMed Soccer Park; Attendance: 1,522; Referee: Danielle Chesky |

| April 23, 2022 3 | Greenville Triumph | 0–2 | Tormenta FC | Greenville, South Carolina |
| 7:00 PM EDT | Walker (yellow card) 43' | Report | Adjei 11'; Phelps (yellow card) 32'; Bosua 40'; Cabral (yellow card) 71'; Sharifi (yellow card) 74' | Stadium: Legacy Early College Field; Attendance: 2,574; Referee: Chris Ruska |

| April 29, 2022 4 | Greenville Triumph | 1–0 | Chattanooga Red Wolves | Greenville, South Carolina |
| 7:00 PM EDT | Shultz (yellow card) 45+1'; Smart (yellow card) 60'; Walker 80' (pen.) | Report | Capozucchi (yellow card) 13'; Espinoza (yellow card) 64' | Stadium: Legacy Early College Field; Attendance: 2,035; Referee: Izlen Peksenar |

| May 7, 2022 5 | Fuego FC | 1–1 | Greenville Triumph | Fresno, California |
| 10:30 PM EDT | Falck (yellow card) 6'; Ramos (yellow card) 41'; Casillas 45+3'; Smith (yellow card) 68'; Chaney (yellow card) 71'; Dieye (yellow card) 84' | Report | Gavilanes (yellow card) 46'; Dulysse 53' (o.g.); Lee (yellow card) 90+3' | Stadium: Fresno State Soccer Stadium; Attendance: 2,752; Referee: Adam Zarrin |

| May 13, 2022 6 | Greenville Triumph | 2–0 | Forward Madison | Greenville, South Carolina |
| 7:00 PM EDT | Walker 28'; Gavilanes 35' | Report | Maldonado (yellow card) 37'; Cassini (yellow card) 43'; Sukow (yellow card) 66' | Stadium: Legacy Early College Field; Attendance: 2,520; Referee: Alyssa Nichols |

| May 21, 2022 7 | North Carolina FC | 1–0 | Greenville Triumph | Cary, North Carolina |
| 7:00 PM EDT | Arriaga 7', (yellow card) 62'; Martinez (yellow card) 74'; McLaughlin (yellow card) 90+3'; Blanco (yellow card) 90+7' | Report | Smart (yellow card) 35' | Stadium: Sahlen's Stadium at WakeMed Soccer Park; Referee: Calin Radosav |

| May 28, 2022 8 | Chattanooga Red Wolves | 0–1 | Greenville Triumph | East Ridge, Tennessee |
| 7:30 PM EDT | Cardona (yellow card) 18'; Benton (yellow card) 38' | Report | Polak (yellow card) 35'; Labovitz 75' | Stadium: CHI Memorial Stadium; Attendance: 2,576; Referee: Benjamin Meyer |

| June 4, 2022 9 | Greenville Triumph | 2–0 | Charlotte Independence | Greenville, South Carolina |
| 7:00 PM EDT | Evans 53'; Smart 78' (pen.) | Report | Santos (yellow card) 26'; Dutey (yellow card) 45+2'; Maya (yellow card) 77'; McNeill (yellow card) 84'; Ciss (yellow card) 88' | Stadium: Legacy Early College Field; Attendance: 2,498; Referee: Albert Kyei-Mensah |

| June 11, 2022 10 | Forward Madison | 3–2 | Greenville Triumph | Madison, Wisconsin |
| 8:00 PM EDT | Cassini 2', 62'; Conner (yellow card) 10'; Shultz 49' (o.g.); Rad (yellow card) 53'; Maldonado (yellow card) 56' | Report | Labovitz 40', (yellow card) 69', (goal) 73' | Stadium: Breese Stevens Field; Attendance: 3,190; Referee: Esad Omanovic |

| June 18, 2022 11 | Union Omaha | 0–2 | Greenville Triumph | Papillion, Nebraska |
| 8:00 PM EDT | Malcolm (yellow card) 24'; Alihožić (yellow card) 86' | Report | Pilato (yellow card) 21'; Labovitz (yellow card) 41' (goal) 44'; Keegan 56'; Fenton (yellow card) 81'; Smart (yellow card) 86'; Brown (yellow card) 90+4' | Stadium: Werner Park; Attendance: 3,662; Referee: Luis Arroyo |

| June 25, 2022 12 | Greenville Triumph | 2–1 | Hailstorm FC | Greenville, South Carolina |
| 7:00 PM EDT | Lee (yellow card) 44'; Smart 54' (pen.); Ibarra 66'; Evans (yellow card) 69'; Walker (yellow card) 80' | Report | Parra 57'; Robles (yellow card) 61' | Stadium: Legacy Early College Field; Attendance: 2,061; Referee: Katherine McCormick |

| June 29, 2022 13 | Greenville Triumph | 3–1 | North Carolina FC | Greenville, South Carolina |
| 7:00 PM EDT | Gavilanes 9'; Pilato (yellow card) 22'; Labovitz 55'; Keegan 59' | Report | Young (yellow card) 85'; Molina 90+4' | Stadium: Legacy Early College Field; Attendance: 2,016; Referee: Aleksandar Zhelyazkov |

| July 3, 2022 14 | FC Tucson | 1–1 | Greenville Triumph | Tucson, Arizona |
| 10:00 PM EDT | Shaw (yellow card) 26'; Toia (yellow card) 71', (goal) 84'; Fox (yellow card) 78' | Report | Coutinho 43'; Smart (yellow card) 63'; Fricke (yellow card) 71' | Stadium: Kino Sports Complex; Attendance: 1,785; Referee: Killian Richardson |

| July 9, 2022 15 | Greenville Triumph | 1–0 | Fuego FC | Greenville, South Carolina |
| 7:00 PM EDT | Evans 66' | Report | Casillas (yellow card) 80' | Stadium: Legacy Early College Field; Attendance: 1,832; Referee: Josiah Parke |

| July 13, 2022 16 | Tormenta FC | 5–5 | Greenville Triumph | Statesboro, Georgia |
| 7:30 PM EDT | Sterling 37', 44' (pen.); Roberts 54'; Otieno 61', (yellow card) 79'; Billhardt 87' | Report | Evans 3', 30'; Gavilanes 10'; Labovitz 21', 45+3'; Christensen (yellow card) 43'; Filerman (yellow card) 65' | Stadium: Optim Health Systems Field; Attendance: 909; Referee: Sergii Demianchuk |

| July 16, 2022 17 | Richmond Kickers | 1–3 | Greenville Triumph | Richmond, Virginia |
| 6:30 PM EDT | Gordon (yellow card) 42'; Bryant (yellow card) 52'; Ritchie (yellow card) 61'; Bentley 72'; Barnathan (yellow card) 87'; Pavone (red card) 90+4' | Report | Labovitz 23', 36', 89'; Smart (yellow card) 69'; Gavilanes (yellow card) 75'; Pilato (yellow card) 82'; Fenton (yellow card) 85' | Stadium: City Stadium; Attendance: 4,143; Referee: Nickrod Fateh |

| July 23, 2022 18 | Greenville Triumph | 0–0 | Union Omaha | Greenville, South Carolina |
| 7:00 PM EDT | Smart (yellow card) 52'; Polak (yellow card) 55' | Report | Doyle (yellow card) 10'; Jiba (yellow card) 32'; Bruce (yellow card) 80'; Piedrahita (yellow card) 88'; Claudio (yellow card) 90+3' | Stadium: Legacy Early College Field; Attendance: 1,895; Referee: Gerald Flores |

| July 30, 2022 19 | Greenville Triumph | 1–3 | Tormenta FC | Greenville, South Carolina |
| 7:00 PM EDT | Polak (yellow card) 21'; Labovitz 37'; Smart (yellow card) 50'; Ibarra (yellow card) 89'; Walker (yellow card) 90+3'; Cox-Ashwood (yellow card) 90+3' | Report | Billhardt (yellow card) 25'; Sterling 27'; Adjei 30'; Otieno (yellow card) 35'; Roberts (yellow card) 39'; Cabral 51'; Jara (yellow card) 90+3' | Stadium: Legacy Early College Field; Attendance: 2,740; Referee: John Rush |

| August 6, 2022 20 | Chattanooga Red Wolves | 5–1 | Greenville Triumph | East Ridge, Tennessee |
| 7:30 PM EDT | Cartagena 3'; Villalobos 7'; Mehl (yellow card) 43'; Benton (yellow card) 45'; Espinoza 70'; Mentzingen 85', 89', (yellow card) 90' | Report | Navarro 17' (o.g.); Labovitz (yellow card) 90' | Stadium: CHI Memorial Stadium; Attendance: 1,932; Referee: Joshua Belk |

| August 13, 2022 21 | Greenville Triumph | 1–0 | Richmond Kickers | Greenville, South Carolina |
| 7:00 PM EDT | Brown 90'; Polak (yellow card) 90+6' | Report | Terzaghi (yellow card) 90+3' | Stadium: Legacy Early College Field; Attendance: 2,924; Referee: Kyle Johnston |

| August 20, 2022 22 | FC Tucson | 0–1 | Greenville Triumph | Tucson, Arizona |
| 10:00 PM EDT | Weir (yellow card) 82'; Crull (yellow card) 90+2' | Report | Waldeck (yellow card) 44'; Walker 47'; Brown (yellow card) 81' | Stadium: Kino Sports Complex; Attendance: 1,293; Referee: Dejan Susak |

| August 27, 2022 23 | Greenville Triumph | 0–2 | Hailstorm FC | Greenville, South Carolina |
| 7:00 PM EDT | | Report | Parra 60', (yellow card) 62'; Desdunes 72' | Stadium: Legacy Early College Field; Attendance: 3,097; Referee: Joshua Encarnación |

| September 3, 2022 24 | Greenville Triumph | 2–2 | Forward Madison | Greenville, South Carolina |
| 7:00 PM EDT | Brown 17'; Gavilanes 69'; Walker (yellow card) 72'; Labovitz (yellow card) 85' | Report | Osmond (yellow card) 13'; Bartman 22'; Cassini (yellow card) 39'; Rad (yellow card) 62'; Streng 90+5' | Stadium: Legacy Early College Field; Attendance: 2,137; Referee: Emma Richards |

| September 9, 2022 25 | Charlotte Independence | 2–1 | Greenville Triumph | Charlotte, North Carolina |
| 7:00 PM EDT | Bennett (penalty scored) 24', (yellow card) 35'; Dutey (yellow card) 69'; Conteh (yellow card) 75'; Santos (yellow card) 77'; 1Shevtsov 85' | Report | Smart (yellow card) 8'; Lee (yellow card) 29'; Fricke 50', (yellow card) 58' | Stadium: American Legion Memorial Stadium; Referee: John Matto |

| September 17, 2022 26 | Union Omaha | 1–1 | Greenville Triumph | Papillion, Nebraska |
| 8:00 PM EDT | Scearce (yellow card) 48'; Hertzog (penalty scored) 76'; Nuhu (yellow card) 90+3' | Report | Fenton (yellow card) 9' (yellow-red card) 80'; Franke (yellow card) 40'; Coutinho (yellow card) 45'; Waldeck (yellow card) 69'; Fricke (yellow card) 75' (yellow-red card) 84'; Walker (penalty scored) 90+3' | Stadium: Werner Park; Attendance: 3,264; Referee: Abdou Ndiaye |

| September 24, 2022 27 | Hailstorm FC | 1–1 | Greenville Triumph | Windsor, Colorado |
| 9:00 PM EDT | Lukic 73'; Parra (yellow card) 85' | Report | Pearson (yellow card) 14' (yellow-red card) 40'; Lee (yellow card) 80', (goal) 90+1'; Labovitz (yellow card) 82' | Stadium: Future Legends Complex; Referee: Katja Koroleva |

| October 1, 2022 28 | Greenville Triumph | 2–2 | FC Tucson | Greenville, South Carolina |
| 7:00 PM EDT | Cox-Ashwood 36'; Fricke (yellow card) 59'; Evans 75'; Brown (yellow card) 89'; Ibarra (yellow card) 90+1' | Report | Calixtro (yellow card) 18'; Fricke 20' (o.g.); Perez (yellow card) 51'; Mastrantonio (yellow card) 61'; Garcia 88'; Kinzner (yellow card) 90' | Stadium: Legacy Early College Field; Attendance: 2,426; Referee: Jervis Atagana |

| October 8, 2022 29 | Greenville Triumph | 1–0 | Charlotte Independence | Greenville, South Carolina |
| 7:00 PM EDT | Walker (yellow card) 25'; Ibarra (yellow card) 45+4'; Labovitz 79' | Report | Santos (yellow card) 58' | Stadium: Legacy Early College Field; Attendance: 4,823; Referee: Gerald Flores |

| October 15, 2022 30 | Richmond Kickers | 1–1 | Greenville Triumph | Richmond, Virginia |
| 6:30 PM EDT | Terzaghi 21'; Pavone (yellow card) 79' | Report | Coutinho (yellow card) 19'; Cox-Ashwood 87' | Stadium: City Stadium; Attendance: 6,000; Referee: Mathew Corrigan |

==== USL1 Playoffs ====
| October 29, 2022 Semi Finals | Greenville Triumph SC | 0–1 | Tormenta FC | Greenville, South Carolina |
| 7:30 PM EDT | | Report | Sterling 42' | Stadium: Legacy Early College Field; Attendance: 2,070; Referee: John Griggs |

=== U.S. Open Cup ===
| April 7, 2022 2nd Round | Greenville Triumph (South Carolina) | 2–0 | (California) Oakland Roots | Greenville, South Carolina |
| 7:00 PM EDT | Keegan 29'; Filerman (yellow card) 81'; Smart 90+4' | Report | Nane (yellow card) 33'; Enríquez (yellow card) 45+2'; Ornstil (yellow card) 45+2'; Diaz (yellow card) 90+1' | Stadium: Legacy Early College Field; Referee: Wilmer Soriano |

| April 20, 2022 3rd Round | Greenville Triumph (South Carolina) | 1–2 | (North Carolina) Charlotte FC | Greenville, South Carolina |
| 7:00 PM EDT | Keegan 59'; Labovitz (yellow card) 85'; Filerman (yellow card) 105+4' | Report | Afful (yellow card) 31', (goal) 105+1'; Ortiz 39'; Ríos (yellow card) 65'; Ruiz (yellow card) 68' | Stadium: Legacy Early College Field; Referee: Kevin Broadley |
