= 2021–22 A.D. Chalatenango season =

91st season in existence of A.D. Chalatenango

A.D. Chalatenango
2021–22 season
- Chairman: (El Salvador) Bertilio Henríquez
- Manager: (Costa Rica) Ricardo Montoya (fired) (El Salvador) Ricardo Serrano (interim) (El Salvador) Erick Dowson Prado
- Ground: Estadio José Gregorio Martínez, Chalatenango, El Salvador
- Primera División: 7th (semifinals)
- Top goalscorer: League: Kemal Orlando Malcolm (11); All: Kemal Orlando Malcolm (11)
- Biggest win: Isidro Metapán 1–4 Chalatenango; Municipal Limeño 0–3 Chalatenango
- All statistics correct as of 20 December 2021.

The 2021–22 Asociación Deportiva Chalatenango season is the association's 91st season in existence. The association is playing in the Primera División de Fútbol de El Salvador, the highest level of football in El Salvador. Chalatenango finished in 7th place and reached the semifinals of the playoffs.

== Players ==
N	Pos.	Nat.	Name	Age	Since	App	Goals	Ends	Transfer fee	Notes
1	GK	(El Salvador)	Henry Edimar Hernández Cruz	40	2021	?	?	?	–	
2	DF	(El Salvador)	Jairo Vladimir González Romero	24	?	?	?	?	–	
3	DF	(El Salvador)	Roberto Carlos Domínguez Fuentes	27	2021	?	?	?	–	
4	DF	(El Salvador)	José Joel Ortega Rodríguez	29	?	?	?	?	–	
5	FW	(El Salvador)	Anthony Vladimir Roque Amaya	29	?	?	?	?	–	
6	DF	(Cuba)	Yosel Piedra Guillén	30	2021	?	?	?	–	
7	FW	(El Salvador)	Meyson de Jesús Ascencio Capacho	31	?	?	?	?	–	
8	FW	(El Salvador)	Yonatan Alexander Pineda Torres	28	?	?	?	?	–	
9	FW	(Colombia)	Bladimir Yovany Díaz Saavedra	32	2021	?	?	?	–	
10	FW	(El Salvador)	Miguel Ángel Lemus Ochoa	31	2018	?	?	?	–	
11	FW	(Jamaica)	Kemal Orlando Malcolm	35	2020	?	?	?	–	
12	FW	(El Salvador)	Iván Adalberto Barahona Díaz	29	?	?	?	?	–	
14	FW	(El Salvador)	Marcos Adonay Rodríguez Ochoa	27	?	?	?	?	–	
15	FW	(El Salvador)	Geovanny Alexander Henríquez Calderón	29	?	?	?	?	–	
16	FW	(El Salvador)	Héctor Raúl Cruz Flores	31	?	?	?	?	–	
19	FW	(El Salvador)	José Rodrigo Herrera Guardado	25	?	?	?	?	–	
20	FW	(Jamaica)	Kenroy Oshane Howell	32	2021	?	?	?	–	
21	FW	(El Salvador)	Carlos Edgardo Anzora Domínguez	32	?	?	?	?	–	
22	MF	(El Salvador)	Richard Guillermo Menjívar Peraza	34	2021	?	?	?	–	
24	GK	(El Salvador)	Cristian Noel Rivera García	24	?	?	?	?	–	
26	FW	(El Salvador)	Brayan Josué Landaverde Rivera	27	?	?	?	?	–	
27	MF	(El Salvador)	Eduardo Alberto Flores Ronquillo	31	?	?	?	?	–	
29	DF	(El Salvador)	Kevin Alberto Hernández Juárez	25	?	?	?	?	–	
30	FW	(El Salvador)	Ricardo Alexander Guevara Deras	32	?	?	?	?	–	
31	MF	(El Salvador)	Luis Francisco León Menjívar	23	?	?	?	?	–	
56	DF	(El Salvador)	Alejandro Ismael Henríquez Ferrufino	22	?	?	?	?	–	
60	DF	(El Salvador)	Leonardo José Menjívar Peñate	23	?	?	?	?	–	

- Last updated: 2 October 2021
- Source: La Primera.com
- Ordered by squad number.

== Competitions ==
=== Primera División ===
==== League table ====
Pos	Team	Pld	W	D	L	GF	GA	GD	Pts	Qualification or relegation
5	Águila (Q)	22	9	7	6	36	27	+9	34	Qualification to Quarterfinals
6	Platense (Q)	22	7	8	7	22	27	−5	29	Qualification to Quarterfinals
7	Chalatenango (Q)	22	7	6	9	31	31	0	27	Qualification to Quarterfinals
8	Jocoro (Q)	22	5	11	6	31	33	−2	26	Qualification to Quarterfinals
9	Atlético Marte	22	6	7	9	22	30	−8	25	

Updated to match(es) played on 9 October 2021. Source: Liga Pepsi
(Q) Qualified for the phase indicated

==== Results summary ====
Overall								Home						Away					
Pld	W	D	L	GF	GA	GD	Pts	W	D	L	GF	GA	GD	W	D	L	GF	GA	GD
22	7	6	9	31	31	0	27	3	4	4	13	15	−2	4	2	5	18	16	+2

Last updated: 27 November 2021.
Source: Asociación Deportiva Chalatenango Calendar

==== Matches ====
Win Draw Loss Fixtures

31 July 2021 1	Chalatenango	2–2	Platense	Armenia, Sonsonate
18:00	Lemus Ochoa 27'; Díaz Saavedra 57'	Report	Delgado Usme 35', 59'	Stadium: Estadio 21 de Noviembre

7 August 2021 2	Atlético Marte	0–2	Chalatenango	Armenia, Sonsonate
18:00		Report	Cruz Flores 63'; Barahona Díaz 87'	Stadium: Estadio 21 de Noviembre

11 August 2021 3	Chalatenango	2–1	Alianza	San Salvador, San Salvador
18:00	Barahona Díaz 44'; Domínguez Fuentes 84'	Report	Riascos Barahona 5'	Stadium: Estadio Cuscatlán

14 August 2021 4	Santa Tecla	1–1	Chalatenango	Armenia, Sonsonate
18:00	Olivera de Mello 79'	Report	Malcolm 11'	Stadium: Estadio 21 de Noviembre

21 August 2021 5	Chalatenango	0–2	Luis Ángel Firpo	Armenia, Sonsonate
16:00		Report	da Silva 42'; Ortega Rodríguez 47' (o.g.)	Stadium: Estadio 21 de Noviembre

25 August 2021 6	Águila	2–1	Chalatenango	San Salvador, San Salvador
19:00	Alfaro Torres 21'; Rugamas Leiva 61'	Report	Malcolm 82'	Stadium: Estadio Cuscatlán

28 August 2021 7	Chalatenango	1–2	Once Municipal	San Salvador, San Salvador
18:00	Malcolm 39'	Report	Medrano Ayarza 49', 85'	Stadium: Estadio Cuscatlán

11 September 2021 8	Jocoro	3–1	Chalatenango	San Salvador, San Salvador
15:00	Turcios Mendoza 55'; Guzmán Villalta 84', 89'	Report	87' (pen.)	Stadium: Estadio Cuscatlán

15 September 2021 9	Chalatenango	1–2	FAS	San Salvador, San Salvador
18:00	Cavel Mendoza 57' (o.g.)	Report	Pineda Torres 78'; Flores Morales 86'	Stadium: Estadio Cuscatlán

18 September 2021 10	Chalatenango	1–1	Municipal Limeño	San Salvador, San Salvador
18:00	Malcolm 53'	Report	Palacios González 20'	Stadium: Estadio Cuscatlán

25 September 2021 11	Isidro Metapán	1–4	Chalatenango	San Salvador, San Salvador
19:00	Gil Hurtado 19'	Report	Díaz Saavedra 13'; Howell 64', 66', 90+1'	Stadium: Estadio Cuscatlán

2 October 2021 12	Platense	2–1	Chalatenango	San Salvador, San Salvador
15:15	Lezcano Obregón 1'; Alfaro Chávez 87'	Report	Malcolm 21'	Stadium: Estadio Cuscatlán

17 October 2021 13	Chalatenango	2–2	Atlético Marte	Armenia, Sonsonate
19:00	Cruz Flores 16'; Malcolm 28'	Report	Verges Collazo 75'; Quejada Murillo 79'	Stadium: Estadio 21 de Noviembre

20 October 2021 14	Alianza	1–0	Chalatenango	San Salvador, San Salvador
15:00	Portillo Leal 31'	Report		Stadium: Estadio Cuscatlán

24 October 2021 15	Chalatenango	0–2	Santa Tecla	Armenia, Sonsonate
19:00		Report	Rodríguez Lloreda 71'; Herrera Baires 89'	Stadium: Estadio 21 de Noviembre

30 October 2021 16	Luis Ángel Firpo	4–2	Chalatenango	Armenia, Sonsonate
18:00	Da Silva 5'; Williams 50', 57', 90+2'	Report	González Romero 21'; Barahona Díaz 45+3'	Stadium: Estadio 21 de Noviembre

3 November 2021 17	Chalatenango	1–1	Águila	Armenia, Sonsonate
19:00	Malcolm 58'	Report	Mayen Villavicencio 72'	Stadium: Estadio 21 de Noviembre

7 November 2021 18	Once Municipal	1–2	Chalatenango	San Salvador, San Salvador
15:00	Menjívar Henríquez 65'	Report	Howell 50'; Malcolm 54'	Stadium: Estadio Cuscatlán

13 November 2021 19	Chalatenango	2–0	Jocoro	Armenia, Sonsonate
15:00	Cruz Flores 53'; Anzora Domínguez 90'	Report		Stadium: Estadio 21 de Noviembre

17 November 2021 20	FAS	1–1	Chalatenango	Santa Ana, Santa Ana
19:00	Coreas Garay 45+2'	Report	Malcolm 16'	Stadium: Estadio Óscar Quiteño

21 November 2021 21	Municipal Limeño	0–3	Chalatenango	Santa Rosa de Lima, La Unión
15:00		Report	Malcolm 60'; Landaverde Rivera 68'; Guevara Deras 87'	Stadium: Estadio Jose Ramon Flores

27 November 2021 22	Chalatenango	1–0	Isidro Metapán	Armenia, Sonsonate
18:00	Malcolm 4'	Preview		Stadium: Estadio 21 de Noviembre

== Statistics ==
=== Goals ===
As of 27 November 2021

Rank	Player	Goals
1	(Jamaica) Kemal Orlando Malcolm	11
2	(Jamaica) Kenroy Oshane Howell	4
2	(El Salvador) Iván Adalberto Barahona Díaz	3
2	(El Salvador) Héctor Raúl Cruz Flores	3
3	(Colombia) Bladimir Yovany Díaz Saavedra	2
3	(El Salvador) Roberto Carlos Domínguez Fuentes	2
4	(El Salvador) Carlos Edgardo Anzora Domínguez	1
4	(El Salvador) Jairo Vladimir González Romero	1
4	(El Salvador) Alexander Guevara Deras	1
4	(El Salvador) Brayan Josue Landaverde Rivera	1
4	(El Salvador) Miguel Ángel Lemus Ochoa	1
4	Unknown	1
Own goals for		1
Total		31
