= Jake Keegan =

American soccer player (born 1991)

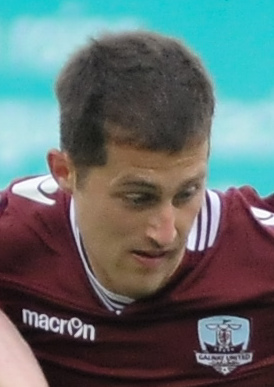
- Jake Keegan in 2015

Personal information
- Date of birth: September 7, 1990 (age 36)
- Place of birth: Stormville, New York, United States
- Height: 5 ft 9 in (1.75 m)
- Position: Forward

Team information
- Current team: Corpus Christi FC
- Number: 12

Youth career
- 1998–2010: East Fishkill Thunder
- 2005–2008: John Jay High School

College career
| Years | Team | Apps | (Gls) |
| 2009–2012 | Binghamton Bearcats | 71 | (28) |

Senior career*
| Years | Team | Apps | (Gls) |
| 2011–2012 | Westchester Flames | 28 | (25) |
| 2012–2013 | Jersey Express | 12 | (7) |
| 2013 | 1. FCA Darmstadt | 18 | (12) |
| 2014–2015 | Galway United | 63 | (27) |
| 2016–2017 | FC Edmonton | 61 | (7) |
| 2018 | St Patrick's Athletic | 32 | (9) |
| 2019–2020 | Greenville Triumph | 38 | (14) |
| 2021 | Forward Madison | 23 | (6) |
| 2022 | Greenville Triumph | 24 | (2) |
| 2023–2024 | One Knoxville | 29 | (6) |
| 2024 | → N. Colorado Hailstorm (loan) | 21 | (2) |
| 2025 | Portland Hearts of Pine | 16 | (2) |
| 2026– | Corpus Christi FC | 32 | (7) |
- * Club domestic league appearances and goals as of October 31, 2026

Jake Keegan (born September 7, 1990) is an American professional soccer player who plays as a forward for USL League One side Corpus Christi FC.

== Youth career ==
=== Youth ===
Keegan played 4 seasons at John Jay High School helping the team win the 2008 Class AA Section 1 Championship and advancing to the New York State Final Four.

Keegan played club soccer for the East Fishkill Thunder. The team was the most successful in club history winning the 2009 Eastern New York State Cup, Region 1 Championship and finishing 3rd at the USYS National Championships.

Keegan also won a gold medal at the 2008 Empire State Games as a member of the Hudson Valley.

=== College ===
Keegan played 4 seasons of NCAA Division 1 soccer at Binghamton University. He became the schools all-time leading Division 1 goal scorer and was drafted in the 2013 MLS Supplemental Draft by the Philadelphia Union of Major League Soccer.

=== PDL ===
Keegan played for the Westchester Flames and Jersey Express for three seasons between 2011 and 2013.

== Professional career ==
=== 1. FCA Darmstadt ===
On September 1, 2013, Keegan signed with 1. FCA Darmstadt in the Verbandsliga, the sixth tier of German soccer. After being drafted by the Philadelphia Union in January 2013, Keegan trained with Maccabi Haifa in Israel, FC Lustenau 07, SC Austria Lustenau, and FC Hard in Austria, Harrisburg City Islanders and New York Cosmos in the United States, and Usinger TSG in Germany before signing with Darmstadt.

=== Galway United ===
On January 29, 2014, Keegan signed with Galway F.C. of the League of Ireland First Division, the second division of Irish soccer. The club was newly formed as a result of Galway United going bankrupt in 2011. Keegan re-signed in 2015 after the club earned promotion to the League of Ireland Premier Division, the top flight in Irish soccer. The club took the old name of Galway United back for the 2015 season.

=== FC Edmonton ===
On December 1, 2015, Keegan signed with Canadian side FC Edmonton who played in the North American Soccer League.

=== St Patrick’s Athletic ===
On February 4, 2018, Keegan signed with St Patrick's Athletic of the League of Ireland Premier Division, the top flight in the Republic of Ireland. Keegan finished up the season as Pats' top scorer with nine league goals, 12 in all competitions.

=== Greenville Triumph ===
On January 10, 2019, Keegan signed with Greenville Triumph SC of USL League One, the third division in the United States. He departed the Triumph after two seasons, scoring 14 goals in all competitions.

=== Forward Madison ===
On January 26, 2021, it was announced that Keegan had signed with Forward Madison FC of USL League One. He made 23 appearances and scored six goals for the Flamingos.

=== Return to Greenville Triumph ===
After spending the 2021 season in Madison, Keegan returned to Greenville on December 21, 2021.

=== One Knoxville SC ===
Keegan remained in USL League One when he was announced as expansion team One Knoxville SC's third signing on December 13, 2022. He made 30 appearances and scored six goals in 2023 with One Knoxville.

==== Loan to Northern Colorado Hailstorm ====
He was loaned to fellow USL League One side Northern Colorado Hailstorm on February 2, 2024, and played the remainder of the 2024 season with the Hailstorm, scoring two times in 33 appearances. Keegan was part of the Hailstorm team that won the 2024 USL Cup.

=== Portland Hearts of Pine ===
On March 18, 2025, Keegan signed with USL League One expansion team Portland Hearts of Pine. He scored his first goal for the Hearts of Pine on April 2 against Hartford Athletic in the 2025 U.S. Open Cup, coming on as a substitute and scoring in extra time to draw the 10-man Hearts level in a match they would win 4–2 on penalties. He finished with three goals across 23 appearances.

=== Corpus Christi FC ===
On February 11, 2026, Keegan signed with another USL League One club, Corpus Christi FC as part of their inaugural season in the division.

== Career statistics ==
As of match played October 22, 2025

Professional Appearances and Goals by club, season and competition
| Club | Season | League | | | National Cup | | League Cup | | Other | | Total | |
| Club | Season | Division | Apps | Goals | Apps | Goals | Apps | Goals | Apps | Goals | Apps | Goals |
|---|---|---|---|---|---|---|---|---|---|---|---|---|
| 1. FCA Darmstadt | 2013 | Verbandsliga Hessen-Süd | 18 | 12 | – | | – | | – | | 18 | 12 |
| Galway United | 2014 | League of Ireland First Division | 30 | 15 | 2 | 1 | 3 | 1 | 2 (Note: Appearances in League of Ireland promotion/relegation playoffs) | 0 | 37 | 17 |
| Galway United | 2015 | League of Ireland Premier Division | 33 | 12 | 2 | 2 | 5 | 2 | – | | 40 | 16 |
| Galway United | Total | | 63 | 27 | 4 | 3 | 8 | 3 | 2 | 0 | 77 | 33 |
| FC Edmonton | 2016 | NASL | 31 | 5 | 2 | 0 | – | | 1 (Note: Appearances in NASL Playoffs) | 0 | 34 | 5 |
| FC Edmonton | 2017 | NASL | 30 | 2 | 2 | 1 | – | | – | | 32 | 3 |
| FC Edmonton | Total | | 61 | 7 | 4 | 1 | 0 | 0 | 1 | 0 | 66 | 8 |
| St Patrick's Athletic | 2018 | League of Ireland Premier Division | 32 | 9 | 1 | 2 | 0 | 0 | 3 (Note: Appearances in Leinster Senior Cup) | 1 | 36 | 12 |
| Greenville Triumph | 2019 | USL League One | 22 | 9 | 2 | 0 | – | | 0 | 0 | 24 | 9 |
| Greenville Triumph | 2020 | USL League One | 16 | 5 | – | | – | | – | | 16 | 5 |
| Greenville Triumph | Total | | 38 | 14 | 2 | 0 | – | | 0 | 0 | 40 | 14 |
| Forward Madison | 2021 | USL League One | 23 | 6 | – | | – | | – | | 23 | 6 |
| Greenville Triumph | 2022 | USL League One | 24 | 2 | 2 | 2 | – | | 1 | 0 | 27 | 4 |
| One Knoxville | 2023 | USL League One | 29 | 6 | 1 | 0 | – | | - | - | 30 | 6 |
| Northern Colorado Hailstorm | 2024 | USL League One | 21 | 2 | 2 | 0 | 9 | 0 | 1 | 0 | 33 | 2 |
| Portland Hearts of Pine | 2025 | USL League One | 16 | 2 | 2 | 1 | 1 | 0 | 2 (Note: Appearances in USL League One Playoffs) | 0 | 23 | 3 |
| Career total | | | 325 | 87 | 18 | 9 | 18 | 3 | 10 | 1 | 371 | 100 |

== Honors ==
Team

- League of Ireland Promotion Playoff Winner: 2014
- EA Sports Cup Finalist: 2015
- Leinster Senior Cup Finalist: 2018
- Europa League Qualification: 2018
- USL League One Finalist: 2019
- USL League One Champion: 2020
- USL Cup Champion: 2024

Individual

- USL PDL Rookie of the Year: 2011
- USL PDL Golden Boot: 2011
- USL PDL All League: 2011
- Galway United Player of the Year: 2015
- USL League One Player of the Month: July 2020
