= Marco Torralva =

American soccer player

Personal information
- Date of birth: August 17, 1996 (age 30)
- Place of birth: Fresno, California, United States
- Height: 1.83 m (6 ft 0 in)
- Position: Midfielder

College career
Years	Team	Apps	(Gls)
2014–2017	UC Merced Golden Bobcats	74	(11)

Senior career*
Years	Team	Apps	(Gls)
2019–2021	Academica SC	14	(1)
2021	Valley FC		
2022	Central Valley Fuego	4	(0)
- * Club domestic league appearances and goals as of October 16, 2022

Marco Torralva (born August 17, 1996) is an American soccer player who currently plays as a midfielder.

== Career ==
=== College and amateur ===
Torralva attended Central High School before going on to play college soccer at the University of California, Merced in 2014, where he went on to make 74 appearances, scoring 11 goals and tallying 14 assists. In his senior year, he earned a Cal Pac Honorable Mention.

Following his college career, Torralva played in the NPSL side Academica SC, where he made 14 appearances and scored a single goal across the 2019 and 2021 seasons, with the 2020 season cancelled due to the COVID-19 pandemic. In 2021, he also played with Valley FC of UPSL during their inaugural and undefeated season, helping the team to the conference title.

=== Central Valley Fuego ===
On February 20, 2022, Torralva signed his first professional contract, joining USL League One team Central Valley Fuego ahead of their inaugural season. He made his debut for Fuego on July 14, 2022, starting in a 1–0 win over Northern Colorado Hailstorm.
