= Jesus Partida =

American soccer player (born 1998)

Personal information
- Date of birth: November 29, 1998 (age 27)
- Place of birth: Reno, Nevada, United States
- Height: 1.80 m (5 ft 11 in)
- Position: Midfielder

Youth career
- 2011–2017: Sagebrush United

College career
Years	Team	Apps	(Gls)
2017–2021	UNLV Rebels	65	(9)

Senior career*
Years	Team	Apps	(Gls)
2022–2023	Central Valley Fuego	35	(1)
- * Club domestic league appearances and goals as of October 14, 2023

Jesus Partida (born November 29, 1998) is an American soccer player who currently plays as a midfielder.

== Career ==
=== Youth & college ===
Partida attended high school at Sparks High School in Nevada, where he was the 3A state tournament MVP after helping Sparks to the state championship title his senior season. He also helped the team to win a pair of conference and regional championships, and was a two-time first team all-league and all-state selection. Partida also played club soccer for Sagebrush United between 2011 and 2017.

In 2017, Partida attended the University of Nevada, Las Vegas to play college soccer. During his time with the Rebels, Partida made 65 appearances, scoring nine goals and tallying five assists. He redshirted the 2019 season due to injury, and the 2020 season was truncated due to the COVID-19 pandemic. In 2017, he was named All-WAC Freshman Team.

=== Central Valley Fuego ===
On April 21, 2022, Partida signed with USL League One club Central Valley Fuego FC. He made his professional debut on April 30, 2022, appearing as a half-time substitute during a 1–0 win over Forward Madison FC, where he scored the game-winning goal with a 40-yard strike.
