= Ofek Antman =

Israeli footballer

Personal information
- Date of birth: March 28, 1996 (age 30)
- Place of birth: Haifa, Israel
- Height: 1.86 m (6 ft 1 in)
- Position: Goalkeeper

Team information
- Current team: Hapoel Acre
- Number: 1

Youth career
- Maccabi Tzur Shalom
- –2014: Hapoel Haifa

Senior career*
Years	Team	Apps	(Gls)
2014–2015	Hapoel Haifa	0	(0)
2016–2017	Ironi Kiryat Shmona	0	(0)
2016–2017	→ Ironi Nesher (loan)	1	(0)
2017–2018	Hapoel Ra'anana	0	(0)
2018	Panserraikos	5	(0)
2018–2021	Hapoel Acre	67	(0)
2022–2023	Central Valley Fuego	25	(0)
2024–2026	Hapoel Hadera	16	(0)
2026–	Hapoel Acre	7	(0)
- * Club domestic league appearances and goals as of 24 June 2026

Ofek Antman (Hebrew: אופק אנטמן; born 28 March 1996) is an Israeli footballer who currently plays as a goalkeeper for Hapoel Acre.

== Career ==
=== Early career ===
Antman played for various teams in Israel and had a spell in the Greek second division with Panserraikos in 2018.

=== Central Valley Fuego ===
On 15 February 2022, Antman signed with USL League One expansion club Central Valley Fuego FC ahead of their inaugural season. He debuted for the club on 2 April 2022, starting and keeping a clean sheet in a 2–0 win over Greenville Triumph.
