= Yuki Shibata =

Japanese footballer

Personal information
- Full name: Yuki Shibata
- Date of birth: 15 January 1998 (age 28)
- Place of birth: Japan
- Height: 5 ft 8 in (1.73 m)
- Position: Winger

Youth career
- Shoshi High School

College career
Years	Team	Apps	(Gls)
- Osaka Gakuin University

Senior career*
Years	Team	Apps	(Gls)
2018	Tarancón	0	(0)
2018–2019	La Granja	14	(2)
2019–2020	Ibar Rožaje	15	(0)
2021	Michigan Stars	2	(0)
2021	Stumptown AC	9	(2)
2022	FC Tucson	8	(0)
2023	Club de Lyon	10	(2)
2023	Albion San Diego	12	(0)
2024	Resources Capital	6	(0)
- * Club domestic league appearances and goals as of 18 March 2024

Yuki Shibata (柴田 勇輝, born 15 January 1998) is a Japanese professional footballer who currently plays as a winger.

== Club career ==
After graduating at Osaka Gakuin University, Shibata signed with Spanish Tercera División side Tarancón, and moving to CD La Granja in September 2018.

In 2019, Shibata signed with Montenegrin Third League side Ibar Rožaje, making 18 appearances in all competitions and scoring a single goal in the Montenegrin Cup.

In 2021, Shibata moved to the United States, joining four-tier NISA side Michigan Stars. After two appearances, he moved to fellow NISA club Stumptown AC.

On 16 March 2022, Shibata signed with USL League One club FC Tucson. He made his debut on 2 April 2022, appearing as a 75th–minute substitute in a 4–0 loss to Richmond Kickers.

On 22 March 2024, Shibata joined Hong Kong Premier League club Resources Capital.
