= Daniel Scally =

Scottish footballer

Personal information
- Date of birth: 20 December 1999 (age 26)
- Place of birth: Glasgow, Scotland
- Height: 1.78 m (5 ft 10 in)
- Position: Winger

Team information
- Current team: Blacktown Spartans
- Number: 15

Youth career
- –2017: St Mirren

Senior career*
Years	Team	Apps	(Gls)
2017–2019	Kilmarnock	0	(0)
2019–2020	Albion Rovers	23	(5)
2020–2021	Forfar Athletic	14	(3)
2021–2022	Stirling Albion	12	(3)
2022	Northern Colorado Hailstorm	12	(0)
2024	Forfar Athletic	9	(1)
2024–2025	HKFC	20	(3)
2026–	Blacktown Spartans	10	(1)
- * Club domestic league appearances and goals as of 11 April 2026

Daniel Scally (born 20 December 1999) is a Scottish professional footballer who plays as a winger for Blacktown Spartans in NSW League One.

== Career ==
Scally began his youth career with St. Mirren, before joining Kilmarnock in 2017. He made a single appearance for Kilmarnock, appearing as a 56th–minute substitute in a Scottish Challenge Cup fixture against Berwick Rangers on 15 August 2017.

In 2019, Scally joined Scottish League Two side Albion Rovers. Following a season with Albion Rovers, he moved up to Scottish League One club Forfar Athletic. Again, after a single season, Scally moved again, joining Stirling Albion in August 2021.

On 26 January 2022, Scally moved to the United States, signing with USL League One club Northern Colorado Hailstorm ahead of their inaugural season. He made his debut for Northern Colorado on 16 April 2022, appearing as an 83rd–minute substitute during a 2–1 loss to Charlotte Independence. Following the 2022 season, Northern Colorado declined his contract option.

On 3 September 2024, Scally joined Hong Kong Premier League club HKFC.

In January 2026, he joined Australian side Blacktown Spartans who play in NSW League One.
