= Rob Cornwall =

Irish footballer

Personal information
- Full name: Robert Cornwall
- Date of birth: 16 October 1994 (age 32)
- Place of birth: Drumcondra, Dublin, Ireland
- Height: 1.83 m (6 ft 0 in)
- Position: Defender

Team information
- Current team: Dundalk
- Number: 24

Youth career
- 2011–2012: St Patrick's Athletic
- 2012–2013: Shelbourne

Senior career*
| Years | Team | Apps | (Gls) |
| 2012 | St Patrick's Athletic | 0 | (0) |
| 2013 | Shelbourne | 22 | (0) |
| 2014–2016 | Shamrock Rovers | 35 | (0) |
| 2014 | → Shamrock Rovers II | 2 | (0) |
| 2015 | → Derry City (loan) | 12 | (1) |
| 2016–2021 | Bohemians | 112 | (4) |
| 2022–2023 | Northern Colorado Hailstorm | 48 | (3) |
| 2024–2025 | Bohemians | 25 | (1) |
| 2026– | Dundalk | 21 | (1) |
- * Club domestic league appearances and goals as of 17:14, 10 November 2026 (UTC)

Robert Cornwall (born 16 October 1994) is an Irish footballer who plays as a defender for League of Ireland Premier Division club Dundalk.

== Career ==
Cornwall began his career with the academy of St Patrick's Athletic, Where he was an unused substitute in 2 Leinster Senior Cup games with the first team, before moving to Shelbourne in the summer of 2012. In 2013, he played with Shelbourne's first team, making 22 appearances.

In 2014, Cornwall moved to Shamrock Rovers, also spending time on loan with Derry City in 2015.

He moved to Bohemians in December 2016, going on to spend five years with the Bohs and making 130 appearances for the club in all competitions.

In December 2021, it was announced Cornwall would move to the United States to sign with third-tier USL League One side Northern Colorado Hailstorm ahead of their inaugural season in 2022.

On 28 December 2023, it was announced that Cornwall would be returning to Bohemians ahead of their 2024 season. On 16 February 2024, Cornwall was substituted off in the first game of the season against Sligo Rovers after suffering an Anterior cruciate ligament injury that would rule him out of action for over a year.

On 13 January 2026, Cornwall signed for recently promoted League of Ireland Premier Division club Dundalk.

== Career statistics ==
As of match played 6 September 2026

Appearances and goals by club, season and competition
| Club | Season | League | | | National cup (Note: Includes FAI Cup & U.S. Open Cup) | | League cup (Note: Includes League of Ireland Cup) | | Continental | | Other | | Total | |
| Club | Season | Division | Apps | Goals | Apps | Goals | Apps | Goals | Apps | Goals | Apps | Goals | Apps | Goals |
|---|---|---|---|---|---|---|---|---|---|---|---|---|---|---|
| St Patrick's Athletic | 2012 | LOI Premier Division | 0 | 0 | 0 | 0 | 0 | 0 | 0 (Note: Appearances in the UEFA Europa League) | 0 | 0 (Note: Appearance(s) in the Leinster Senior Cup) | 0 | 0 | 0 |
| Shelbourne | 2013 | LOI Premier Division | 22 | 0 | 2 | 0 | 1 | 0 | – | | 3 | 0 | 28 | 0 |
| Shamrock Rovers | 2014 | LOI Premier Division | 14 | 0 | 1 | 0 | 1 | 0 | – | | 0 | 0 | 16 | 0 |
| Shamrock Rovers | 2015 | LOI Premier Division | 0 | 0 | – | | 2 | 0 | 0 | 0 | 1 | 0 | 3 | 0 |
| Shamrock Rovers | 2016 | LOI Premier Division | 21 | 0 | 3 | 0 | 2 | 0 | 2 | 0 | 1 | 0 | 29 | 0 |
| Shamrock Rovers | Total | | 35 | 0 | 4 | 0 | 5 | 0 | 2 | 0 | 2 | 0 | 48 | 0 |
| Shamrock Rovers II (loan) | 2014 | LOI First Division | 2 | 0 | – | | – | | – | | – | | 2 | 0 |
| Derry City (loan) | 2015 | LOI Premier Division | 12 | 1 | 2 | 0 | – | | – | | – | | 14 | 1 |
| Bohemians | 2017 | LOI Premier Division | 29 | 0 | 1 | 0 | 2 | 0 | – | | 0 | 0 | 32 | 0 |
| Bohemians | 2018 | LOI Premier Division | 26 | 2 | 2 | 0 | 0 | 0 | – | | 2 (Note: Appearances in the Scottish Challenge Cup) | 0 | 30 | 2 |
| Bohemians | 2019 | LOI Premier Division | 17 | 0 | 3 | 0 | 0 | 0 | – | | 0 | 0 | 20 | 0 |
| Bohemians | 2020 | LOI Premier Division | 14 | 0 | 1 | 0 | – | | 1 | 0 | – | | 16 | 0 |
| Bohemians | 2021 | LOI Premier Division | 27 | 2 | 3 | 0 | – | | 5 (Note: Appearances in the UEFA Europa Conference League) | 1 | – | | 35 | 3 |
| Bohemians | Total | | 113 | 4 | 10 | 0 | 2 | 0 | 6 | 1 | 2 | 0 | 133 | 5 |
| Northern Colorado Hailstorm | 2022 | USL League One | 26 | 1 | 2 | 1 | – | | – | | – | | 28 | 2 |
| Northern Colorado Hailstorm | 2023 | USL League One | 22 | 2 | 2 | 0 | – | | – | | 1 (Note: Appearance in the 2021 USL League One Playoffs) | 0 | 25 | 2 |
| Northern Colorado Hailstorm | Total | | 48 | 3 | 4 | 1 | – | | – | | 1 | 0 | 53 | 4 |
| Bohemians | 2024 | LOI Premier Division | 1 | 0 | 0 | 0 | – | | – | | 0 | 0 | 1 | 0 |
| Bohemians | 2025 | LOI Premier Division | 24 | 1 | 0 | 0 | – | | – | | 0 | 0 | 24 | 1 |
| Bohemians | Total | | 25 | 1 | 0 | 0 | – | | – | | 0 | 0 | 25 | 1 |
| Dundalk | 2026 | LOI Premier Division | 19 | 1 | 2 | 0 | – | | – | | 1 | 0 | 22 | 1 |
| Career total | | | 276 | 10 | 24 | 0 | 8 | 0 | 6 | 1 | 9 | 0 | 323 | 11 |
