= Mueng Sunday =

Nigerian footballers

Personal information
- Full name: Muengnenshime Sunday Goshit
- Date of birth: 1 March 1994 (age 32)
- Place of birth: Mangu, Nigeria
- Height: 1.70 m (5 ft 7 in)
- Positions: Full-back; midfielder

Youth career
- Eastern Iowa United SC

College career
Years	Team	Apps	(Gls)
2013–2016	Drake Bulldogs	72	(4)

Senior career*
Years	Team	Apps	(Gls)
2014–2019	Des Moines Menace	39	(3)
2021	OKC Energy	9	(0)
2022	FC Tucson	17	(0)
- * Club domestic league appearances and goals as of October 11, 2022

Muengnenshime Sunday Goshit (born 1 March 1994) is a Nigerian footballer who plays as a midfielder.

== Career ==
=== College ===
Sunday played college soccer at Drake University between 2013 and 2016, scoring 4 goals and tallying 10 assists in 72 appearances for the Bulldogs.

=== Amateur ===
From 2014 and 2019, Sunday played with USL League Two sides Des Moines Menace, making a total of 39 regular season appearances for the club, scoring 3 goals during the 2014 season. He helped Des Moines to three regular season championships and five Heartland Division titles during his time at the club.

=== Professional ===
Sunday signed with USL Championship side OKC Energy on 12 February 2021 following a successful tryout in 2020. Due to COVID-19 restrictions, Sunday was unable to officially sign with Energy FC until 2021. He made his professional debut on 24 April 2021, starting in a 3–1 loss to FC Tulsa.

Sunday signed with FC Tucson on 23 March 2022.
