= Fernando Garcia (soccer, born 1999) =

American soccer player

Personal information
- Date of birth: May 22, 1999 (age 27)
- Place of birth: Charlotte, North Carolina, United States
- Height: 6 ft 2 in (1.88 m)
- Position: Forward

Youth career
- –2017: Charlotte Soccer Academy

College career
Years	Team	Apps	(Gls)
2017	Charlotte 49ers	17	(2)
2019	NTCC Eagles	18	(7)
2020–2021	UNC Greensboro Spartans	31	(7)

Senior career*
Years	Team	Apps	(Gls)
2021	Flint City Bucks	9	(1)
2022	Des Moines Menace	4	(3)
2022	FC Tucson	18	(4)
2023	Des Moines Menace		
2023	Greenville Triumph	1	(0)
- * Club domestic league appearances and goals as of October 16, 2023

Fernando Garcia (born May 22, 1999) is an American soccer player.

== Playing career ==
=== College & amateur ===
Garcia attended South Mecklenburg High School, who he helped to capture the 2015 State Championship after finishing the season undefeated. Garcia was also captain of the Charlotte Soccer Academy U18 team in his senior year.

In 2017, Garcia committed to playing college soccer at the University of North Carolina at Charlotte. In his single seasons with the 49ers, Garcia made 17 appearances, scoring two goals and adding one assist. In 2018, he transferred to Eastern Florida State College, but didn't compete with their soccer team. 2019 saw Garcia play with Northeast Texas Community College, where he went on to score seven goals in 18 appearances, and earned United Soccer Coaches Men's Junior College Division I All-South Region Teams Second-Team honors. Garcia again transferred in 2020, this time to play with the University of North Carolina at Greensboro, where he played across the 2020–21 and 2021 seasons, truncated due to the COVID-19 pandemic. Here he scored seven goals in 31 games, finishing with four assists to his name and was named First Team All-SoCon.

During his time at college, Garcia also appeared in the USL League Two with Flint City Bucks during their 2021 season. Here he scored a single goal in ten appearances across the regular season and playoffs. In 2022, Garcia again played in the USL League Two, competing with Des Moines Menace, scoring three goals in four appearances, including an effort against St. Croix SC, which received coverage on ESPN's SportsCenter.

=== FC Tucson ===
On June 21, 2022, Garcia signed with USL League One side FC Tucson. He bagged his first professional goal on June 25, 2022, scoring the game-winning goal in a 2–1 win over Chattanooga Red Wolves.
