= Francois Dulysse =

Haitian footballer (born 1999)

François Dulysse
Personal information
- Full name: François André Dulysse
- Date of birth: April 13, 1999 (age 27)
- Place of birth: Lexington, Kentucky, United States
- Height: 1.83 m (6 ft 0 in)
- Position: Defender

Team information
- Current team: Vllaznia
- Number: 13

Youth career
- 2011–2016: Boca United
- 2016: Portland Timbers

College career
Years	Team	Apps	(Gls)
2016–2018	UCF Knights	23	(0)
2019–2020	Manhattan Jaspers	15	(0)

Senior career*
Years	Team	Apps	(Gls)
2018	Portland Timbers U23s	4	(0)
2019	Treasure Coast Tritons	1	(0)
2021	New England Revolution II	11	(0)
2022–2023	Central Valley Fuego	40	(2)
2024–2025	Egnatia	45	(0)
2025–2026	Hapoel Hadera	29	(0)
2026–	Vllaznia	2	(0)

International career^{‡}
2018	Haiti U20	3	(0)
2021	Haiti U23	3	(0)
2021–	Haiti	15	(0)
- * Club domestic league appearances and goals as of 13 September 2026 ‡ National team caps and goals as of 27 September 2025

François André Dulysse (born April 13, 1999) is a Haitian professional footballer who plays as a defender for Israeli club Hapoel Hadera. Born in the United States, he plays for the Haiti national team.

== Career ==
=== Youth, College & Amateur ===
Dulysse played with USSDA side Boca United in Florida, before spending time with Portland Timbers in 2016 whilst graduating from Beaverton High School.

In 2016, Dulysse played college soccer at the University of Central Florida, where he went on to make 23 appearances for the Knights over three seasons. In 2019, Dulysse transferred to Manhattan College and went on to play 15 games for the Jaspers. He missed a full senior year due to the COVID-19 pandemic.

Whilst at college, Dulysse played with USL League Two side Portland Timbers U23s in 2018, and Treasure Coast Tritons in 2019.

=== Professional ===
On December 9, 2020, it was announced that Dulysse had signed with USL League One side New England Revolution II ahead of their 2021 season. On January 21, 2021, Dulysse was drafted 51st overall in the 2021 MLS SuperDraft by New England Revolution, securing his MLS rights should be signed to the club's first team roster.

On April 10, 2021, Dulysse made his professional debut, starting against Fort Lauderdale CF. Dulysse was not announced as a returning player for the club's 2022 season where they'd be competing in the newly formed MLS Next Pro.

Dulysse signed with Central Valley Fuego in February 2022, ahead of their inaugural season in USL League One.

=== International ===
Dulysse has represented the Haiti national football team at U20 and U23 level. He was called up to represent the senior Haiti national team at the 2021 CONCACAF Gold Cup. He debuted with Haiti in a Gold Cup match against Canada on 15 July 2021.

== Personal ==
Dulysse was born in Lexington, Kentucky, but moved to Greenacres, Florida at the age of two.

== Career statistics ==
=== International ===
As of match played 27 September 2026

Appearances and goals by national team and year
National team	Year	Apps	Goals
Haiti	2021	3	0
Haiti	2022	3	0
Haiti	2023	2	0
Haiti	2024	5	0
Haiti	2025	1	0
Haiti	2026	1	0
Total		15	0

== Honours ==
Egnatia

- Albanian Cup: 2023–24
