= Burke Fahling =

American professional soccer player

Personal information
- Date of birth: August 3, 1997 (age 29)
- Place of birth: Tupelo, Mississippi, United States
- Height: 5 ft 8 in (1.73 m)
- Position: Midfielder

Team information
- Current team: Eintracht Nordhorn
- Number: 3

Youth career
- Crossfire Premier
- –2016: Seattle Sounders FC

College career
Years	Team	Apps	(Gls)
2016–2017	Memphis Tigers	33	(2)
2018–2020	Seattle Redhawks	20	(1)

Senior career*
Years	Team	Apps	(Gls)
2018	OSA Seattle	2	(0)
2021–2022	Charleston Battery	27	(2)
2022	→ FC Tucson (loan)	27	(0)
2023	Pittsburgh Riverhounds	14	(2)
2024	Tacoma Defiance	17	(1)
2025	Weston Bears	24	(6)
2026–	Eintracht Nordhorn	1	(0)
- * Club domestic league appearances and goals as of 09:23, 12 March 2026 (UTC)

Burke Fahling (born August 3, 1997) is an American professional soccer player for Eintracht Nordhorn.

== Career ==
=== Youth ===
Fahling spent time in the academy setup of USSDA sides Crossfire Premier and Seattle Sounders FC.

=== College and amateur ===
In 2016, Fahling went to play college soccer at the University of Memphis. Over two seasons with the Tigers, Fahling made 33 appearances, scoring 2 goals and tallying 7 assists, also been a two time AAC Weekly Honor Roll recipient. In 2018, Fahling returned to Washington, transferring to Seattle University, where he managed one season in three years, missing 2018 due to injury and the 2020 season due to the COVID-19 pandemic. Fahling made 20 appearances for the Redhawks, scoring a single goal and tallying 5 assists.

In 2018, Fahling also appeared for NPSL side OSA Seattle, making 2 appearances.

=== Professional ===
On February 26, 2021, Fahling signed with USL Championship side Charleston Battery following a successful trial. He made his professional debut on May 7, 2021, appearing as a 60th-minute substitute during a 1–1 draw with New York Red Bulls II.

On March 31, 2022, Fahling joined USL League One club FC Tucson on loan.

Following the 2022 season, Fahling was released by Charleston. He subsequently joined USL Championship side Pittsburgh Riverhounds for their 2023 season. He assisted Illal Osumanu's goal that allowed the Riverhounds to defeat San Diego Loyal SC, 2–1. At the end of the 2023 season in the Players' Shield winning campaign, Fahling's 2024 option was not used, and he became a free agent.

On February 27, 2024, Burke Fahling signed with MLS Next Pro club Tacoma Defiance after coming up through the Seattle Sounders academy earlier in his career. Fahling made his debut on March 15, 2024, against Austin FC II in the 3–1 win.
