= Nortei Nortey =

English footballer (born 1994)

Personal information
- Full name: Nii Nortei Nortey
- Date of birth: 29 October 1994 (age 32)
- Place of birth: Hammersmith, London, England
- Height: 1.80 m (5 ft 11 in)
- Position: Midfielder

Team information
- Current team: Dagenham & Redbridge
- Number: 24

Youth career
- 2008–2013: Chelsea
- 2014: Maidenhead United

Senior career*
Years	Team	Apps	(Gls)
2015–2016	Welling United	32	(1)
2016–2017	Wrexham	6	(0)
2016–2017	→ Solihull Moors (loan)	3	(0)
2017	Solihull Moors	15	(1)
2017–2019	Dover Athletic	67	(6)
2019–2020	Chorley	24	(0)
2020–2021	Queen of the South	10	(1)
2022–2023	Northern Colorado Hailstorm	58	(3)
2024	Union Omaha	16	(1)
2026–	Dagenham & Redbridge	1	(0)
- * Club domestic league appearances and goals as of 12:01, 25 February 2026 (UTC)

Nii Nortei Nortey (born 29 October 1994) is an English professional footballer who plays as a midfielder for National League South club Dagenham & Redbridge.

Nortey started his career at Chelsea's academy but was released in 2013 and had a spell at Maidenhead United before joining Welling United in August 2015, where he started his senior career. He joined Wrexham ahead of the following season, but made just 6 league appearances before joining Solihull Moors on loan in December 2016, before joining them permanently in January 2017.

He signed for Dover Athletic in summer 2017, before being released at the end of the 2018–19 season after 6 goals in 67 league matches. He joined Chorley in September 2019 but left the club after their relegation to the National League North. He signed for Scottish Championship side Queen of the South in October 2020.

== Early and personal life ==
Nortey's parents are both from Ghana, but he was born in Hammersmith, London, and grew up in London.

=== Welling United ===
Having subsequently had multiple trial spells across Europe, including at Sheffield Wednesday, he joined Maidenhead United on a free transfer in February 2014. On 11 August 2015, he joined National League side Welling United on a short-term deal. He made his senior debut as a half-time substitute in a 1–0 away defeat to Forest Green Rovers that same day. His full Welling debut came on 19 September in a 2–1 away victory over Gateshead. He scored his first senior goal on 28 March 2016 with a near-post flick – the winning goal of a 2–1 victory over Woking. Nortey made 32 league appearances for Welling – scoring once – as Welling were relegated to the National League South after finishing bottom of the National League on 35 points.

=== Wrexham and Solihull Moors ===
On 22 June 2016, he joined National League side Wrexham on a one-year deal. He made his debut as a 93rd minute substitute in a 3–2 victory away to Guiseley on 9 August 2016. His first start of the season came on 10 September in a 1–0 home victory over Sutton United, but was substituted off at half-time. Having made 6 league appearances, he joined fellow National League club Solihull Moors on a one-month loan deal on 6 December 2016. After making three league appearances during his loan spell, he joined Solihull Moors on a permanent basis on 6 January 2017 following the termination of his contract at Wrexham. He scored his first goal for Solihull on 18 March 2017 in the 90th minute of a 4–1 victory over North Ferriby United after coming on as a substitute. He scored once in 15 league matches during his permanent spell at the club.

=== Dover Athletic ===
Nortey joined National League Dover Athletic on a one-year deal following a trial period in July 2017. He started their opening game of the season as Dover defeated Hartlepool United 1–0 away from home on 5 August. He scored his first goal for Dover on 16 September 2017 as they won 4–0 at home to Chester, with Nortey scoring the third after 70 minutes. He scored five goals in 33 matches for Dover during the 2017–18 National League. The 2018–19 season saw him make 34 appearances in the National League, scoring once with the opening goal of a 4–3 victory over Havant & Waterlooville on 14 August 2018. However, he was released by Dover at the end of his contract in summer 2019.

=== Chorley ===
In September 2019, Nortey joined Chorley, having spent pre-season on trial with Bradford City. He made his debut on 24 September as a substitute in a 3–1 defeat at home to Barrow. His full debut was a 0–0 draw with Dagenham & Redbridge on 28 September 2019. Following the early conclusion of the National League season in March 2020 due to the COVID-19 pandemic in England with Chorley bottom after 38 games, they were relegated to the National League North after the table was decided on a points per game system, with Chorley finishing bottom. Nortey appeared in 24 league matches for Chorley, but was released by Chorley at the end of the season.

=== Queen of the South ===
Nortey signed for Scottish Championship club Queen of the South in October 2020 until the 31 May 2021.

=== Northern Colorado Hailstorm ===
On 27 January 2022, Nortey moved to the United States to sign with third-tier USL League One club Northern Colorado Hailstorm ahead of their inaugural season.

=== Union Omaha ===
Nortey joined Union Omaha of USL League One on 16 January 2024. Nortey featured 29 times in all competitions as the club finished top of the league, going on to win the 2024 championship play-offs.

=== Dagenham & Redbridge ===
On 24 February 2026, Nortey returned to English football, joining National League South club Dagenham & Redbridge on a short-term deal until the end of the season.

== International career ==
Nortey was born in England but is also eligible to represent Ghana at international level.

== Career statistics ==
As of 30 April 2021

Appearances and goals by club, season and competition
Club	Season	League			National Cup		League Cup		Other		Total	
Club	Season	Division	Apps	Goals	Apps	Goals	Apps	Goals	Apps	Goals	Apps	Goals
Welling United	2015–16	National League	32	1	0	0	0	0	0	0	32	1
Wrexham	2016–17	National League	6	0	0	0	0	0	0	0	6	0
Solihull Moors (loan)	2016–17	National League	3	0	0	0	0	0	0	0	3	0
Solihull Moors	2016–17	National League	15	1	0	0	0	0	1 (Note: Appearances in the FA Trophy)	0	16	1
Dover Athletic	2017–18	National League	33	5	2	0	0	0	3	0	38	5
Dover Athletic	2018–19	National League	34	1	2	0	0	0	3	0	39	1
Dover Athletic	Total		67	6	4	0	0	0	6	0	77	6
Chorley	2019–20	National League	24	0	2	0	0	0	1	0	27	0
Chorley	2020–21	National League	0	0	0	0	0	0	0	0	0	0
Chorley	Total		24	0	2	0	0	0	1	0	27	0
Queen of the South (loan)	2020–21	Scottish Championship	10	1	0	0	2	0	0	0	12	1
Career total			157	9	6	0	2	0	7	0	172	9

== Honours ==
Union Omaha

- USL League One: 2024
