= Diego Casillas =

Mexican footballer (born 1994)

Personal information
- Date of birth: 20 December 1994 (age 31)
- Place of birth: Tepalcatepec, Mexico
- Height: 1.65 m (5 ft 5 in)
- Position: Midfielder

Youth career
- –2013: Monache Marauders

College career
Years	Team	Apps	(Gls)
2013–2014	Taft Cougars		
2015–2016	Cal State San Bernardino Coyotes	31	(9)

Senior career*
Years	Team	Apps	(Gls)
2016–2017	Fresno Fuego	15	(3)
2018	Fresno FC U-23	13	(4)
2019	Fresno FC	21	(2)
2020	Reno 1868	1	(0)
2020	→ Oakland Roots (loan)	6	(0)
2021	Los Angeles Force	12	(2)
2022–2023	Central Valley Fuego	33	(3)
- * Club domestic league appearances and goals as of 14 October 2023

Diego Casillas (born 20 December 1994) is a Mexican professional footballer who plays as a midfielder.

Casillas signed with USL League One expansion club Central Valley Fuego on January 19, 2022.
