= Nathan Smith (soccer, born 1994) =

American soccer player

Personal information
- Full name: Nathan Morgan Smith
- Date of birth: October 18, 1994 (age 32)
- Place of birth: Clovis, California, United States
- Height: 1.78 m (5 ft 10 in)
- Position: Defender

Youth career
- 2011–2013: LA Galaxy

College career
Years	Team	Apps	(Gls)
2013–2015	UCLA Bruins	49	(1)

Senior career*
Years	Team	Apps	(Gls)
2016	LA Galaxy II	24	(0)
2017	LA Galaxy	12	(0)
2017	→ LA Galaxy II (loan)	9	(0)
2018–2019	Portland Timbers 2	47	(1)
2020–2021	Orange County SC	31	(0)
2022	Central Valley Fuego	23	(1)

International career
2009–2011	United States U17	23	(1)
- * Club domestic league appearances and goals as of October 16, 2022

Nathan Morgan Smith (born October 18, 1994) is an American soccer player.

== Career ==
Smith played college soccer at the University of California, Los Angeles between 2013 and 2015. While at UCLA, Smith appeared for PSA Elite in 2014 and 2015.

He opted to forgo his senior year with the Bruins, instead signing with LA Galaxy II of the United Soccer League.

After spending two seasons with Portland Timbers 2, Smith signed with Orange County SC ahead of the 2020 season.

Smith signed with USL League One expansion side Central Valley Fuego FC on January 5, 2022.
