= Franco Pérez (footballer, born 1998) =

Argentine footballer

Personal information
- Full name: Franco Farid Pérez
- Date of birth: 4 November 1998 (age 28)
- Place of birth: Necochea, Argentina
- Position: Forward

Team information
- Current team: Ferro Carril Oeste

Youth career
- Aldosivi

Senior career*
| Years | Team | Apps | (Gls) |
| 2018–2022 | Aldosivi | 25 | (0) |
| 2022 | → FC Tucson (loan) | 17 | (2) |
- * Club domestic league appearances and goals as of 20:07, 16 October 2022 (UTC)

Franco Farid Pérez (born 4 November 1998) is an Argentine professional footballer who plays as a forward for Ferro Carril Oeste.

== Career ==
Pérez started his career with Aldosivi. During the 2018–19 Argentine Primera División campaign, the forward was promoted to the club's senior squad for a fixture with San Lorenzo on 2 December 2018; coming off the substitutes bench with seven minutes remaining and subsequently assisting Aldosivi's second equaliser of a 2–2 draw.

On 11 February 2022, Pérez signed on loan with USL League One side FC Tucson for their 2022 season.

== Career statistics ==
As of 23 January 2019.

Club statistics
| Club | Season | League | | | Cup | | Continental | | Other | | Total | |
| Club | Season | Division | Apps | Goals | Apps | Goals | Apps | Goals | Apps | Goals | Apps | Goals |
|---|---|---|---|---|---|---|---|---|---|---|---|---|
| Aldosivi | 2018–19 | Primera División | 2 | 0 | 0 | 0 | — | | 0 | 0 | 2 | 0 |
| Career total | | | 2 | 0 | 0 | 0 | — | | 0 | 0 | 2 | 0 |
