= Venton Evans =

Jamaican footballer (born 1998)

Personal information
- Date of birth: 19 June 1998 (age 28)
- Place of birth: Kingston, Jamaica
- Height: 1.83 m (6 ft 0 in)
- Position: Defensive midfielder

Team information
- Current team: Portmore United F.C.

Senior career*
Years	Team	Apps	(Gls)
2017–2019	Portmore United	50	(3)
2020	UWI	8	(0)
2021	Fort Lauderdale CF	21	(4)
2022–2023	Greenville Triumph	37	(6)

International career
2019	Jamaica U22	4	(0)
- * Club domestic league appearances and goals as of 16 October 2023

Venton Evans (born 19 June 1998) is a Jamaican footballer who plays as a defensive midfielder for Portmore United F.C..

== Career ==
=== Club ===
==== Portmore United ====
Evans started his career for Portmore United in Jamaica, winning two league titles.

==== UWI FC ====
In January 2020, Evans was transferred to UWI FC.

==== Fort Lauderdale CF ====
Evans signed with USL League One side Fort Lauderdale CF ahead of their 2021 season. He made his debut on 24 April 2021, start and scoring in a 4–2 loss to North Texas SC.

=== Greenville Triumph ===
On 23 December 2021, Evans signed with USL League One side Greenville Triumph ahead of their 2022 season.

=== International ===
Evans was called up to the U22 Olympic national team in 2019.

== Honors ==
- Jamaica National Premier League: 2

2017–18, 2018–19

- CFU Club Championship: 1

2019 CFU Club Champion
