= Kemal Malcolm =

Jamaican footballer (born 1989)

Personal information
- Date of birth: 19 November 1989 (age 36)
- Place of birth: Jamaica
- Height: 1.80 m (5 ft 11 in)
- Position: Attacking midfielder

Team information
- Current team: Once Deportivo
- Number: 11

College career
Years	Team	Apps	(Gls)
2009	Tonkawa Mavericks	22	(28)
2010	Tampa Spartans	16	(6)

Senior career*
Years	Team	Apps	(Gls)
2011–2012	Waterhouse	24	(12)
2012–2021	Arnett Gardens	98	(65)
2021–2022	C.D. Chalatenango	48	(28)
2022–2023	Union Omaha	18	(2)
2023–2024	Empire Strykers (indoor)	4	(5)
2024–	Once Deportivo	9	(2)

International career^{‡}
2011–	Jamaica	8	(2)
- * Club domestic league appearances and goals as of 18:09, 26 September 2024 (UTC) ‡ National team caps and goals as of 08:20, 8 September 2019 (UTC)

Kemal Malcolm (born 19 November 1989) is a Jamaican professional footballer who plays as a midfielder for Once Deportivo in El Salvador.

== Education ==
He did his high school at St. George's High School and he played soccer for Neville Bell in the school. Malcolm also attended and played soccer at the University of Tampa in 2010–2011.

== Career ==
=== Club ===
As of 2018, Malcolm plays for Arnett Gardens F.C. in Jamaica. In 2021, he moved to A.D. Chalatenango in El Salvador. In April 2022, Malcolm signed with Union Omaha of USL League One.

=== International ===
Malcolm has been capped several times for the Jamaica senior national team.
