= Central Valley Fuego FC =

Association football team in the US

Fuego FC
- Full name: Central Valley Fuego Football Club
- Founded: August 12, 2020; 5 years ago
- Stadium: Fresno State Soccer Stadium
- Capacity: 1,000
- Owners: Juan and Alicia Ruelas
- Head coach: Santiago Aguilera (Fuego U23)
- League: National Premier Soccer League
- 2025: 4th of NorCal Conference; Playoffs:
- Website: fuegofc.com
Home colors

Central Valley Fuego FC, also known as CV Fuego FC or simply Fuego FC, is an American professional soccer team based in Fresno, California. The team was founded in 2020, and played its inaugural season in 2022. The team most recently competed in USL League One, the third tier of the US soccer league system and plays its home matches at Fresno State Soccer Stadium.

After the 2024 USL League One season, the team and league announced that they had come to "a mutual decision to part ways." The League for Clubs, an amateur league, later announced that the Fuego's U23 team would be joining for the 2025 season.

== History ==
=== Foundation and early years ===
Central Valley Fuego FC became the twelfth professional club in California and the only one in Fresno after Fresno FC withdrew from USL Championship in 2019, the club was announced on December 8, 2020 and the logo was unveiled on January 21, 2021. The team's name is a nod to the former Fresno Fuego that played in USL League Two from 2003 to 2019.

The team's first permanent head coach was Martín Vásquez, as Milton Blanco took the reins for the first three matches in club history following Jaime Ramirez's unexpected departure.

The club kicked off its inaugural season with a 2–0 victory over Greenville Triumph SC, and finished the 2022 season in eighth place with 11 wins, 12 draws, and seven losses.

=== Struggles and leaving League One ===
The 2023 season was disastrous for the Fuego, however. The team finished last in League One, and Vásquez was fired midway through the season on July 3, replaced by Adam Smith on an interim basis. Smith himself would be replaced by Edison Gonzalez, also on an interim basis, less than two months later.

Ahead of the 2024 season, the Fuego hired former United States men's national soccer team star Jermaine Jones as its new head coach. Jones's tenure at the helm was controversial, however, with the Fuego again struggling on the pitch. In October of 2024, Jones was suspended by the USL for the remainder of the 2024 season after an independent investigation revealed Jones had harassed and threatened his players on multiple occasions. The Fuego ultimately finished last for the second consecutive season, and Jones departed the club after the season.

On November 14, 2024, the team and league announced that they had come to "a mutual decision to part ways," and that plans for the future of the club would be made in the near future.

On January 31, 2025, upstart amateur division The League for Clubs announced that the Fuego's U23 team would be joining for the 2025 season.

== Colors and crest ==
Fuego colors are black and red. The club's logo is based on a shield shaped like the head of a spade, representing the agricultural laborers of California's Central Valley. Across the top of this shield is the name of the team, while below lie three diagonal stripes of black-green-black which represent agriculture and growth. In base are red flames which represent the team's name and the passion for soccer of the local population.

== Record ==
=== Year-by-year ===
As of July 28, 2025

Central Valley Fuego
Season	League	P	W	L	D	GF	GA	Pts	Pos	Playoffs	US Open Cup	Player	Goals	Head coach
2022	USL1	30	11	12	7	37	40	40	8th	Did not qualify	R3	(United States) Christian Chaney	10	(United States) Martín Vásquez
2023	USL1	32	6	21	5	36	61	23	12th	Did not qualify	R2	(El Salvador) Alexis Cerritos	9	(United States) Martín Vásquez (3–10–1) (England) Adam Smith (1–6–2) (United States) Edison Gonzalez (2–5–2)
2024	USL1	22	5	14	3	27	51	18	12th	Did not qualify	R2	(Honduras) Dembor Benson	4	(United States) Jermaine Jones
Fuego FC U–23
2025	TLC	12	7	3	2	42	20	23	4th, NorCal	Region Quarterfinals	DNE	Isaiah Villalobos	10	–

1. Top Scorer includes statistics from league matches only.

=== Head coaches ===
- Includes USL Regular Season, USL Playoffs, U.S. Open Cup. Excludes friendlies.

Coach	Nationality	Start	End	Games	Win	Loss	Draw	Win %
Jaime Ramirez	United States	January 1, 2022	February 1, 2022	0	0	0	0	—
Milton Blanco (interim)	United States	February 2, 2022	April 14, 2022	3	2	0	1	66.67
Martín Vásquez	United States	April 14, 2022	July 3, 2023	44	13	24	7	29.55
Adam Smith (interim)	England	July 3, 2023	August 30, 2023	9	1	6	2	11.11
Edison Gonzalez (interim)	United States	August 30, 2023	November 5, 2023	9	2	5	2	22.22
Jermaine Jones	United States	November 6, 2023	present	24	6	15	3	25.00

== Honors ==
=== Player honors ===
Year	Player	Country	Position	Honor
USL League One
2024	Alfredo Midence	Honduras	Forward	Golden Playmaker Young Player of the Year All-League Second Team

== See also ==
- USL League One
- Soccer in the United States
