= 2023 Forward Madison FC season =

Forward Madison FC
2023 season
- Owner: Big Top Events
- Chief operating officer: Conor Caloia
- Head coach: Matt Glaeser
- Stadium: Breese Stevens Field
- USL League One: 6th of 12
- USL1 Playoffs: Quarterfinals
- U.S. Open Cup: Second round
- Top goalscorer: League: Christian Chaney (10); All: Christian Chaney (11)
- Highest home attendance: 5,000 (September 30 vs. LEX)
- Lowest home attendance: 1,802 (April 11 vs. CHI, USOC)
- Average home league attendance: 4,310
- Biggest win: 3 goals: MAD 4–1 GVL (April 15), MAD 3–0 NCA (June 10)
- Biggest defeat: 3 goals: MAD 1–4 TRM (July 26), NCO 4–1 MAD (October 24, Playoffs)

The 2023 Forward Madison FC season was the fifth season in the soccer team's history, where they competed in USL League One of the third division of American soccer.

== Club ==
=== Roster ===
No.	Pos.	Nat.	Name	Date of birth (age)	Since	On loan from
2	DF	(United States)	Robert Screen	May 25, 2000 (age 26)	2023	
3	DF	(United States)	Jason Ramos	October 9, 1998 (age 27)	2023	Minnesota United FC 2
4	DF	(Australia)	Mitch Osmond	March 11, 1994 (age 32)	2022	
5	DF	(United States)	Timmy Mehl	August 31, 1995 (age 30)	2023	
6	MF	(United States)	Ozzie Ramos	September 11, 1996 (age 29)	2023	
7	MF	(United States)	Isidro Martinez	March 15, 1997 (age 29)	2023	
8	MF	(United States)	Eric Conerty	January 21, 2000 (age 26)	2023	
9	FW	(United States)	Christian Chaney	September 8, 1994 (age 31)	2023	
10	FW	(Uganda)	Jayden Onen	February 17, 2001 (age 25)	2023	
12	DF	(New Zealand)	Sam Brotherton	October 29, 1996 (age 29)	2023	
14	FW	(Venezuela)	Mauro Cichero	August 1, 1995 (age 31)	2023	
16	DF	(Austria)	Jake Crull	October 3, 1997 (age 28)	2023	
17	FW	(United States)	Derek Gebhard	October 15, 1995 (age 30)	2021	
18	FW	(England)	Francis Jno-Baptiste	November 8, 1999 (age 26)	2023	
22	DF	(United States)	Stephen Payne	June 16, 1997 (age 29)	2023	
23	MF	(England)	Aiden Mesias	October 23, 1999 (age 26)	2023	
24	FW	(South Africa)	Nazeem Bartman	August 13, 1993 (age 32)	2022	
26	MF	(Mexico)	Tino Vasquez (Note: USL Academy contract)	April 17, 2006 (age 20)	2023	
28	MF	(United States)	Andrew Wheeler-Omiunu	December 1, 1992 (age 33)	2022	
33	MF	(United States)	Julio Benitez	July 30, 2005 (age 21)	2023	Real Salt Lake
44	MF	(United States)	Pierre da Silva	July 28, 1998 (age 28)	2023	
55	GK	(Philippines)	Bernd Schipmann	July 5, 1994 (age 32)	2023	
56	GK	(United States)	Martin Sanchez	July 4, 2000 (age 26)	2023	

=== Left team mid-season ===
No.	Pos.	Nat.	Name	Date of birth (age)	Since	On loan from
19	MF	(United States)	Wolfgang Prentice	April 25, 2000 (age 26)	2023	Oakland Roots SC
29	FW	(United States)	Demitrius Kigeya	January 15, 2000 (age 26)	2023	

=== Coaching staff ===
Name	Position
(United States) Matt Glaeser	Head coach and technical director
(United States) Neil Hlavaty	Assistant coach
(United States) Jim Launder	Assistant coach
(United States) John Pascarella	Assistant coach

=== Front office staff ===
Name	Position
(United States) Conor Caloia	Chief operating officer
(United States) Vern Stenman	President
(United States) Zane Heinselman	Vice President and General Manager
(United States) Keith Tiemeyer	Director of Soccer Operations & Development

== Transfers ==
=== Transfers in ===
Date from	Position	Player	Last team	Type	Ref.
December 7, 2022	DF	(Austria) Jake Crull	FC Tucson	Free transfer	
December 7, 2022	DF	(United States) Stephen Payne	Richmond Kickers	Free transfer	
December 7, 2022	DF	(United States) Timmy Mehl	Tampa Bay Rowdies	Free transfer	
December 7, 2022	FW	(United States) Christian Chaney	Central Valley Fuego FC	Free transfer	
January 16, 2023	DF	(New Zealand) Sam Brotherton	(New Zealand) Auckland City FC	Free transfer	
January 17, 2023	MF	(England) Jayden Onen	(England) Sheffield Wednesday F.C.	Free transfer	
January 18, 2023	MF	(England) Aiden Mesias	(Germany) SSV Ulm 1846	Free transfer	
January 19, 2023	FW	(Venezuela) Mauro Cichero	Charleston Battery	Free transfer	
February 1, 2023	FW	(England) Francis Jno-Baptiste	(England) Brightlingsea Regent F.C.	Free transfer	
February 7, 2023	MF	(United States) Eric Conerty	Western Michigan Broncos	Free transfer	
February 8, 2023	GK	(Philippines) Bernd Schipmann	(Thailand) Ratchaburi F.C.	Free transfer	
February 23, 2023	MF	(United States) Julio Benitez	Real Salt Lake	Loan	
March 15, 2023	DF	(United States) Robert Screen	Kentucky Wildcats	Free transfer	
March 16, 2023	GK	(United States) Martin Sanchez	Northern Illinois Huskies	Free transfer	
March 20, 2023	MF	(United States) Isidro Martinez	Rio Grande Valley FC Toros	Free transfer	
March 22, 2023	MF	(Mexico) Tino Vasquez	Chicago Fire Academy	Free transfer	
April 10, 2023	MF	(United States) Wolfgang Prentice	Oakland Roots SC	Loan	
June 27, 2023	FW	(United States) Demitrius Kigeya	Gonzaga Bulldogs	Free transfer	
August 8, 2023	MF	(United States) Pierre da Silva	Miami FC	Free transfer	
September 7, 2023	MF	(United States) Ozzie Ramos	Central Valley Fuego FC	Trade (Note: Central Valley Fuego FC received a 2024 international roster spot in exchange for Ramos.)	
September 13, 2023	DF	(United States) Jason Ramos	Minnesota United FC 2	Loan	

=== Transfers out ===
Date from	Position	Player	To	Type	Ref.
October 20, 2022	GK	(Cuba) Raiko Arozarena	Tampa Bay Rowdies	End of loan	
October 27, 2022	FW	(Finland) Jeremiah Streng	(Finland) SJK Seinäjoki	End of loan	
November 2, 2022	DF	(United States) Carl Schneider		Retired	
November 7, 2022	MF	(United States) Alann Torres	Indy Eleven	End of loan	
December 7, 2022	DF	(United States) Christian Dean		Contract ended	
December 7, 2022	MF	(United States) Audi Jepson		Contract ended	
December 7, 2022	DF	(Trinidad and Tobago) Alvin Jones		Contract ended	
December 7, 2022	GK	(United States) Parker Smith		Contract ended	
December 7, 2022	FW	(Jamaica) Rojay Smith		Contract ended	
December 7, 2022	DF	(Canada) Mélé Temguia		Contract ended	
December 13, 2022	DF	(United States) Eric Leonard	Chicago Fire FC II	Undisclosed transfer	
January 6, 2023	DF	(United States) Mikey Maldonado	North Carolina FC	Free transfer	
January 9, 2023	MF	(Brazil) Matheus Cassini	South Georgia Tormenta FC	Free transfer	
January 19, 2023	MF	(United States) Christian Enriquez	Chattanooga Red Wolves SC	Free transfer	
January 25, 2023	GK	(United States) Phil Breno	Tampa Bay Rowdies	Free transfer	
January 31, 2023	MF	(United States) Justin Sukow	Richmond Kickers	Free transfer	
February 6, 2023	DF	(United States) Cyrus Rad	Huntsville City FC	Free transfer	
March 15, 2023	DF	(United States) Cesar Murillo	Lexington SC	Free transfer	
March 25, 2023	FW	(Senegal) Abdou Mbacke Thiam	Maryland Bobcats FC	Free transfer	
April 2, 2023	MF	(United States) Drew Conner		Retired	
June 15, 2023	MF	(United States) Wolfgang Prentice	Oakland Roots SC	End of loan	
July 22, 2023	FW	(United States) Demitrius Kigeya		Contract ended	

== Exhibitions ==
February 24, 2023 Preseason 1	Chicago Fire FC II	1–3	Forward Madison FC	Bridgeview, Illinois
10:00 AM CST	Monis 20'	Report	Cichero 9'; Kigeya 58', 80'; Trialist (yellow card) 75'	Stadium: Bridgeview Sports Dome
Note: Closed to the public.

March 3, 2023 Preseason 2	Indy Eleven	1–0	Forward Madison FC	Westfield, Indiana
12:00 PM EST	Blake 10'; Lindley (yellow card) 33'	Report	Gebhard (yellow card) 35'	Stadium: Grand Park Sports Campus
Note: Closed to the public.

March 11, 2023 Preseason 3	Forward Madison FC	3–0	DePaul Blue Demons	Madison, Wisconsin
2:00 PM CST	Onen 3' (Conerty), (yellow card) 16'; Gebhard 43'; Chaney (yellow card) 56'; Trialist 70'	Report	Amoo-Mensah (yellow card) 40'; Anderson (yellow card) 57'	Stadium: Breese Stevens Field

April 22, 2023 Midseason 1	Forward Madison FC	3–2	Wisconsin Badgers	Madison, Wisconsin
6:00 PM CDT	Chaney 4' (Martinez); Mehl (yellow card) 38'; Brotherton (yellow card) 61'; Vasquez 63' (Prentice); Jno-Baptiste 90' (Conerty)	Report	Osmond 27' (o.g.); C. Crockford 86'	Stadium: Breese Stevens Field

July 20, 2023 Midseason 2	Forward Madison FC (United States)	1–2	(Mexico) Atlante F.C.	Madison, Wisconsin
7:00 PM CDT	Kigeya 54' (Trialist)	Report	Sánchez (yellow card) 45'; Bermúdez (yellow card) 45+1'; Machado 80' (pen.); Martinez 90+4'	Stadium: Breese Stevens Field; Attendance: 4,388

== Competitions ==
=== Overview ===
Competition	First match	Last match	Starting round	Final position	Record							
Competition	First match	Last match	Starting round	Final position	Pld	W	D	L	GF	GA	GD	Win %
USL League One	March 26, 2023	October 14, 2023	Matchday 1	6th	32	11	10	11	38	40	−2	34.38
USL1 Playoffs	October 21, 2023		Quarterfinals	Quarterfinals	1	0	0	1	1	4	−3	0.00
U.S. Open Cup	April 11, 2023		Second round	Second round	1	0	0	1	2	3	−1	0.00
Total					34	11	10	13	41	47	−6	32.35

Source: Competitions

=== USL League One ===
==== Standings ====
Pos	Team	Pld	W	L	T	GF	GA	GD	Pts	Qualification
4	Charlotte Independence	32	13	9	10	50	42	+8	49	Qualification for the play-offs
5	Greenville Triumph SC	32	13	10	9	45	40	+5	48	Qualification for the play-offs
6	Forward Madison FC	32	11	11	10	38	40	−2	43	Qualification for the play-offs
7	Tormenta FC	32	12	14	6	55	56	−1	42	
8	One Knoxville SC	32	9	12	11	36	39	−3	38	

Source: USL League One
Rules for classification: 1) points; 2) total wins; 3) total goal differential; 4) total goals scored; 5) points earned against top four Conference finishers; 6) disciplinary points; 7) drawing of lots.

==== Results summary ====
Overall								Home						Away					
Pld	W	D	L	GF	GA	GD	Pts	W	D	L	GF	GA	GD	W	D	L	GF	GA	GD
32	11	10	11	38	40	−2	43	6	5	5	20	17	+3	5	5	6	18	23	−5

Source: USL League One

==== Results by round ====
Round	1	2	3	4	5	6	7	8	9	10	11	12	13	14	15	16	17	18	19	20	21	22	23	24	25	26	27	28	29	30	31	32
Stadium	A	A	H	H	A	A	H	A	H	A	H	A	H	A	A	H	A	H	H	A	H	H	A	A	A	H	H	H	A	H	A	H
Result	D	D	W	D	D	W	L	W	L	L	W	W	W	W	L	W	D	L	D	W	W	L	L	D	L	D	W	D	L	D	L	L
Position	4	9	2	4	8	4	4	3	4	7	5	4	3	3	3	2	3	3	4	3	3	4	6	5	6	5	5	6	6	6	6	6

Source: USL League One
A = Away; H = Home; W = Win; D = Draw; L = Loss

==== Matches ====
March 26, 2023 1	Union Omaha	1–1	Forward Madison FC	Omaha, Nebraska
2:00 PM CDT	Scearce 20' (Gil); Acoff (yellow card) 40'; Palacios (yellow card) 63'; Brewer (yellow card) 89'	Report	Chaney 55' (Gebhard); Wheeler-Omiunu (yellow card) 77'; Osmond (yellow card) 82'	Stadium: Al F. Caniglia Field; Attendance: 1,913; Referee: Nabil Bensalah

April 8, 2023 2	Lexington SC	0–0	Forward Madison FC	Georgetown, Kentucky
7:00 PM EDT	Machell (yellow card) 60'; Balogun (yellow card) 68'	Report	Mesias (yellow card) 48'; Osmond (yellow card) 65'; Cichero (yellow card) 71'	Stadium: Toyota Stadium; Attendance: 3,029; Referee: John Matto

April 15, 2023 3	Forward Madison FC	4–1	Greenville Triumph SC	Madison, Wisconsin
6:00 PM CDT	Gebhard 12'; Cichero 45' (Onen); Wu 50' (o.g.); Chaney 55' (Onen), (yellow card) 71'; Onen (red card) 72'	Report	Pilato 48' (Gavilanes); Biggar (yellow card) 65'; Walker (yellow card) 71'; Lee (yellow card) 76'	Stadium: Breese Stevens Field; Attendance: 3,223; Referee: Rebeca Pagan

April 29, 2023 4	Forward Madison FC	0–0	Charlotte Independence	Madison, Wisconsin
5:00 PM CDT	Payne (yellow card) 28'; Chaney (yellow card) 81'	Report	Ibarra (yellow card) 65'; Kelly (yellow card) 79'; Dunwell (yellow card) 90+1'	Stadium: Breese Stevens Field; Attendance: 3,541; Referee: Kevin Fikar

May 3, 2023 5	One Knoxville SC	0–0	Forward Madison FC	Knoxville, Tennessee
7:00 PM EDT	O'Hearn (yellow card) 50'; Kelly-Rosales (yellow card) 71'; Claudio (yellow card) 85'	Report	Chaney (yellow card) 53'; Gebhard (yellow card) 82'	Stadium: Regal Stadium; Attendance: 1,555; Referee: José Carlos Rivero

May 13, 2023 6	North Carolina FC	0–2	Forward Madison FC	Cary, North Carolina
7:00 PM EDT	Navarro (yellow card) 47'; Arriaga (yellow card) 60'	Report	Martinez 14' (Crull), (yellow card) 90+2'; Onen (yellow card) 45+2'; Osmond 68' (Martinez); Schipmann (yellow card) 90+7'	Stadium: WakeMed Soccer Park; Attendance: 2,610; Referee: Abdou Ndiaye

May 18, 2023 7	Forward Madison FC	0–2	Northern Colorado Hailstorm FC	Madison, Wisconsin
7:00 PM CDT	Cichero (yellow card) 45+1'; Mehl (red card) 52'	Report	Amann 11', 75' (Hernández), (yellow card) 37'; Kwakwa (yellow card) 17'; Opara (yellow card) 47'; Rendón (yellow card) 58'	Stadium: Breese Stevens Field; Attendance: 3,537; Referee: Olvin Oliva

May 27, 2023 8	Union Omaha	1–2	Forward Madison FC	Papillion, Nebraska
7:00 PM CDT	Brito (yellow card) 6'; Brewer Jr. 21'; Willis (yellow card) 78'; Dos Santos (yellow card) 90+5'	Report	Cichero (yellow card) 10'; Mesias 14' (Payne), (yellow card) 33'; Bartman (yellow card) 39'; Chaney 53' (Payne); Schipmann (yellow card) 56'	Stadium: Werner Park; Attendance: 2,886; Referee: Gabriele Ciampi

June 3, 2023 9	Forward Madison FC	1–2	Central Valley Fuego FC	Madison, Wisconsin
7:00 PM CDT	Chaney, (yellow card) 90+8'; Mehl (yellow card) 53'	Report	Falck (yellow card) 59'; Vasquez 74' (Lemus), (yellow card) 81'; Cromwell (yellow card) 78'; Cerritos 84' (pen.); Ramos (yellow card) 90'	Stadium: Breese Stevens Field; Attendance: 4,924; Referee: Kevin Fikar

June 7, 2023 10	Chattanooga Red Wolves SC	2–0	Forward Madison FC	East Ridge, Tennessee
7:30 PM EDT	Mensah 37' (Espinoza); Marsh 45' (Mensah), (yellow card) 74'; Cardona (yellow card) 57'	Report	Brotherton (yellow card) 7'; Mesias (yellow card) 81'	Stadium: CHI Memorial Stadium; Attendance: 2,211; Referee: Fevzi Demirhan

June 10, 2023 11	Forward Madison FC	3–0	North Carolina FC	Madison, Wisconsin
7:00 PM CDT	Payne 44' (Martinez); Prentice 64' (Jno-Baptiste); Crull 75' (Chaney); Cichero (yellow card) 81'	Report	Maldonado (yellow card) 28'; Servania (yellow card) 77'; Mentzingen (yellow card) 80'; Blanco (yellow card) 89'	Stadium: Breese Stevens Field; Attendance: 4,567; Referee: Matt Geringer

June 17, 2023 12	Richmond Kickers	0–1	Forward Madison FC	Richmond, Virginia
7:00 PM EDT	Gordon (yellow card) 77'; Mecham (yellow card) 90+4'	Report	Onen (yellow card) 69'; Payne 78' (Bartman)	Stadium: City Stadium; Attendance: 4,902; Referee: Donovan Eubank

June 22, 2023 13	Forward Madison FC	3–2	Lexington SC	Madison, Wisconsin
7:00 PM CDT	Bartman 18' (Onen); Crull 35'; Chaney 43'; Cichero (red card) 64'	Report	Green (yellow card) 34'; Brown 38' (Machell), 60' (Balogun); Knight (yellow card) 64'	Stadium: Breese Stevens Field; Attendance: 4,572; Referee: José Carlos Rivero

June 28, 2023 14	South Georgia Tormenta FC	0–1	Forward Madison FC	Statesboro, Georgia
7:30 PM EDT	Akoto (yellow card) 45+2'; Kilwein (yellow card) 90+5'	Report	Bartman 24' (Payne); Onen (yellow card) 55'	Stadium: Optim Sports Medicine Field at Tormenta Stadium; Attendance: 1,192; Referee: Jair Campos

July 1, 2023 15	Greenville Triumph SC	1–0	Forward Madison FC	Greenville, South Carolina
7:00 PM EDT	Walker 35' (pen.)	Report	Payne (yellow card) 34'; Brotherton (yellow card) 51'; Mehl (yellow card) 90+2'	Stadium: Paladin Stadium; Attendance: 1,532; Referee: Cristian Campo Hernández

July 8, 2023 16	Forward Madison FC	1–0	Central Valley Fuego FC	Madison, Wisconsin
7:00 PM CDT	Gebhard 16' (Onen); Schipmann (yellow card) 71'; Osmond (yellow card) 90+5'	Report	Forth (yellow card) 25'; Carrera-García (yellow card) 42'; Cromwell (yellow card) 78'	Stadium: Breese Stevens Field; Attendance: 4,716; Referee: Adam Brzozowiec

July 15, 2023 17	North Carolina FC	2–2	Forward Madison FC	Cary, North Carolina
7:00 PM EDT	Anderson 67' (McLaughlin), 90+3'; Flick (yellow card) 81'; Servania (yellow card) 90+10'	Report	Gebhard (yellow card) 11', (goal) 16' (Payne); Chaney (yellow card) 27'; Bartman 37'; Brotherton (red card) 54'; Conerty (yellow card) 85'	Stadium: WakeMed Soccer Park; Attendance: 1,875; Referee: Michael O'Reilly

July 26, 2023 18	Forward Madison FC	1–4	South Georgia Tormenta FC	Madison, Wisconsin
6:00 PM CDT	Chaney 1' (Wheeler-Omiunu), (yellow card) 90+3'; Mehl (yellow card) 39'; Mesias (yellow card) 90+3'	Report	Cassini 8' (Kilwien); Otieno (yellow card) 44'; Sterling 48' (Khoury), 55' (Khoury); Khoury 69' (Akoto)	Stadium: Breese Stevens Field; Attendance: 4,083; Referee: Olvin Oliva

July 29, 2023 19	Forward Madison FC	1–1	Greenville Triumph SC	Madison, Wisconsin
7:00 PM CDT	Payne (yellow card) 10'; Chaney 11' (Martinez); Onen (yellow card) 39'; Mesias (yellow card) 40'	Report	Castro (yellow card) 18'; Franke 53'; Walker (yellow card) 81'	Stadium: Breese Stevens Field; Attendance: 4,828; Referee: Gabriele Ciampi

August 5, 2023 20	Richmond Kickers	1–2	Forward Madison FC	Richmond, Virginia
7:00 PM EDT	Barnathan 87' (pen.)	Report	Bartman 35'; Onen 74' (Gebhard); Crull (yellow card) 90+7'	Stadium: City Stadium; Attendance: 4,336; Referee: Cristian Campo Hernández

August 9, 2023 21	Forward Madison FC	1–0	Chattanooga Red Wolves SC	Madison, Wisconsin
7:00 PM CDT	Mehl (yellow card) 24'; Cichero (yellow card) 39'; Onen (yellow card) 68'; Payne 90' (Onen), (yellow card) 90+1'	Report	Filipe (yellow card) 29'; Rentería (yellow card) 45+3'; Madrid (yellow card) 68'; Hernández (yellow card) 84'	Stadium: Breese Stevens Field; Attendance: 4,125; Referee: John Rush

August 12, 2023 22	Forward Madison FC	1–2	One Knoxville SC	Madison, Wisconsin
7:00 PM CDT	Payne (yellow card) 25'; Bartman 32' (Onen); Chaney (yellow card) 38'; Onen (yellow card) 65'; Osmond (yellow card) 75'	Report	Skelton (yellow card) 3'; Crisler 24' (Waldeck); Waldeck (yellow card) 29'; Ross 37' (Keegan); Lewis (yellow card) 90+7'; Fletcher (yellow card) 90+8'	Stadium: Breese Stevens Field; Attendance: 4,694; Referee: Servando Berna Rico

August 19, 2023 23	South Georgia Tormenta FC	4–2	Forward Madison FC	Statesboro, Georgia
7:30 PM EDT	Osmond 18' (o.g.); Heckenberg (yellow card) 39'; Sterling 49' (pen.), 55' (Akale); Akale 58' (Fonseca); Murphy (yellow card) 60'; Nembhard (yellow card) 75'	Report	Chaney 12', (yellow card) 60'; Onen 26' (Chaney); Payne (yellow card) 75'	Stadium: Optim Sports Medicine Field at Tormenta Stadium; Attendance: 1,238; Referee: Joe Surgan

August 26, 2023 24	Central Valley Fuego FC	4–4	Forward Madison FC	Fresno, California
7:30 PM PDT	Carrera-García 1' (Cromwell), (yellow card) 45+5'; Lemus (yellow card) 14'; Bijev 28' (Dabo); Dulysse 45' (Falck); Lawal 52' (pen.)	Report	Onen 5' (Bartman); Chaney 16' (pen.), 83' (da Silva); Gebhard (yellow card) 19'; Osmond (yellow card) 45+2'; Crull (yellow card) 51' (yellow-red card) 52'; Conerty (yellow card) 55'; da Silva 70'	Stadium: Fresno State Soccer Stadium; Attendance: 892; Referee: Edgar García

September 2, 2023 25	Chattanooga Red Wolves SC	3–1	Forward Madison FC	East Ridge, Tennessee
7:30 PM EDT	Cardona (yellow card) 18', (goal) 45' (Marsh); Williams (yellow card) 24', (goal) 65' (Gómez); Marsh (yellow card) 34'; Gómez (yellow card) 69'; Lomis 78' (Marsh); Tejera (yellow card) 90+5'	Report	Gebhard 8'; Conerty (yellow card) 38'; Onen (yellow card) 69'; Payne (yellow card) 90+5'	Stadium: CHI Memorial Stadium; Attendance: 2,287; Referee: Aleksandar Zhelyazkov

September 9, 2023 26	Forward Madison FC	0–0	One Knoxville SC	Madison, Wisconsin
7:00 PM CDT	Chaney (yellow card) 57' (yellow-red card) 90+3'; Cichero (red card) 90+6'; Mesias (yellow card) 90+6'	Report	Johnson (yellow card) 37'; Waldeck (yellow card) 44' (yellow-red card) 48'; Crisler (yellow card) 59'; Claudio (yellow card) 82'	Stadium: Breese Stevens Field; Attendance: 4,854; Referee: Matt Geringer

September 14, 2023 27	Forward Madison FC	2–0	Richmond Kickers	Madison, Wisconsin
7:00 PM CDT	Gebhard 3' (Bartman); Osmond (yellow card) 44'; Mesias 46' (Gebhard); da Silva (yellow card) 49'	Report	Vinyals (yellow card) 12'; Cole (yellow card) 18'; Johnson (yellow card) 66'; Morán (yellow card) 79'; Aune (yellow card) 84'	Stadium: Breese Stevens Field; Attendance: 3,878; Referee: Olvin Oliva

September 20, 2023 28	Forward Madison FC	0–0	Northern Colorado Hailstorm FC	Madison, Wisconsin
7:00 PM CDT	da Silva (yellow card) 77'; Chaney (yellow card) 87'	Report	Dietrich (yellow card) 28'; Cornwall (yellow card) 60'; Nortey (yellow card) 90+4'	Stadium: Breese Stevens Field; Attendance: 3,681; Referee: Richonne Clark

September 23, 2023 29	Charlotte Independence	2–0	Forward Madison FC	Charlotte, North Carolina
5:00 PM EDT	Bennett 45+1'; Ciss 62' (Mbuyu); Obertan (yellow card) 72'; Kelly (yellow card) 85'	Report	Martinez (yellow card) 74'; J. Ramos (yellow card) 81'	Stadium: American Legion Memorial Stadium; Attendance: 1,511; Referee: Aleksandar Zhelyazkov

September 30, 2023 30	Forward Madison FC	2–2	Lexington SC	Madison, Wisconsin
5:00 PM CDT	Martinez (yellow card) 55'; Gebhard 65'; Cichero 78'	Report	Diouf 74'; Jackson 84'	Stadium: Breese Stevens Field; Attendance: 5,000; Referee: Cristian Campo Hernández

October 7, 2023 31	Northern Colorado Hailstorm FC	2–0	Forward Madison FC	Windsor, Colorado
7:00 PM MDT	Powder 49', (yellow card) 84'; Robles (yellow card) 57'; Amann 71' (pen.)	Report	Wheeler-Omiunu (yellow card) 39'	Stadium: TicketSmarter Stadium at Future Legends Complex; Attendance: 2,392; Referee: Arnel Selman

October 14, 2023 32	Forward Madison FC	0–1	Union Omaha	Madison, Wisconsin
6:00 PM CDT	Wheeler-Omiunu (yellow card) 44'; Chaney (yellow card) 75'; Brotherton (yellow card) 88'; da Silva (yellow card) 90+1'	Report	Kunga (yellow card) 35'; Scearce (yellow card) 41'; Dos Santos 64' (Kunga); Gallardo (yellow card) 90+3'; Nuhu (yellow card) 90+9'	Stadium: Breese Stevens Field; Attendance: 4,740; Referee: Velimir Stefanovic

==== USL League One Playoffs ====
October 21, 2023 Quarterfinals	Northern Colorado Hailstorm FC	4–1	Forward Madison FC	Windsor, Colorado
7:00 PM MDT	Hernández (yellow card) 43'; Amann; Rendón (yellow card) 45+4'; Rogers 65'	Report	Martinez (yellow card) 38'; Schipmann (yellow card) 45+1'; Chaney 57' (Payne); Mehl (yellow card) 90+7'	Stadium: TicketSmarter Stadium at Future Legends Complex; Attendance: 3,011; Referee: Joshua Encarnación

=== U.S. Open Cup ===
As a member of USL League One, Forward Madison FC will enter the 2023 U.S. Open Cup in the second round, taking place between April 4–6, 2023.

April 11, 2023 Second round	Forward Madison FC (Wisconsin)	2–3	(Illinois) Chicago House AC	Madison, Wisconsin
6:00 PM CDT	Chaney (yellow card) 18'; Onen; Vasquez 48' (Onen); Cichero (yellow card) 70'	Report	Seymour (yellow card) 22'; Mann 75' (Avalos); Smith 90+2', 103' (Mentasti)	Stadium: Breese Stevens Field; Attendance: 1,802; Referee: Calin Radosav
Note: Game rescheduled from its original date of April 4th due to expected inclement weather.

== Statistics ==
All statistics as of October 21, 2023.

=== Appearances and goals ===
No.	Pos.	Nat.	Name	USL1 Season			USL1 Playoffs			U.S. Open Cup			Total		
No.	Pos.	Nat.	Name	Apps	Starts	Goals	Apps	Starts	Goals	Apps	Starts	Goals	Apps	Starts	Goals
2	DF	(United States)	Robert Screen	16	0	0	0	0	0	1	1	0	17	1	0
3	DF	(United States)	Jason Ramos (Note: Joined Forward Madison FC after the team was eliminated from the 2023 U.S. Open Cup.)	5	1	0	0	0	0				5	1	0
4	DF	(Australia)	Mitch Osmond	29	29	1	1	1	0	1	0	0	31	30	1
5	DF	(United States)	Timmy Mehl	23	23	0	1	1	0	1	1	0	25	25	0
6	MF	(United States)	Ozzie Ramos	6	2	0	1	0	0				7	2	0
7	MF	(United States)	Isidro Martinez	26	22	1	1	1	0	1	0	0	28	23	1
8	MF	(United States)	Eric Conerty	21	2	0	0	0	0	1	1	0	22	3	0
9	FW	(United States)	Christian Chaney	30	24	10	1	1	1	1	1	0	32	26	11
10	MF	(England)	Jayden Onen	26	22	3	0	0	0	1	1	1	27	23	4
12	DF	(New Zealand)	Sam Brotherton	15	13	0	1	1	0	1	1	0	17	15	0
14	FW	(Venezuela)	Mauro Cichero	27	14	2	1	1	0	1	1	0	29	16	2
16	DF	(Austria)	Jake Crull	32	32	2	1	1	0	1	1	0	34	34	2
17	FW	(United States)	Derek Gebhard	32	28	6	1	0	0	1	0	0	34	28	6
18	FW	(England)	Francis Jno-Baptiste	14	4	0	0	0	0	1	0	0	15	4	0
22	DF	(United States)	Stephen Payne	32	32	3	1	1	0	1	0	0	34	33	3
23	MF	(England)	Aiden Mesias	30	26	2	0	0	0	1	0	0	31	26	2
24	FW	(South Africa)	Nazeem Bartman	30	26	5	1	1	0	0	0	0	31	27	5
26	MF	(Mexico)	Tino Vasquez	3	0	0	0	0	0	1	1	1	4	1	1
28	MF	(United States)	Andrew Wheeler-Omiunu	27	15	0	1	1	0	1	1	0	29	17	0
33	MF	(United States)	Julio Benitez	0	0	0	0	0	0	0	0	0	0	0	0
44	MF	(United States)	Pierre da Silva	12	3	1	1	0	0				13	3	1
55	GK	(Philippines)	Bernd Schipmann	32	32	0	1	1	0	1	1	0	34	34	0
56	GK	(United States)	Martin Sanchez	0	0	0	0	0	0	0	0	0	0	0	0
Players who left Forward Madison FC during the season
19	MF	(United States)	Wolfgang Prentice (Note: Prentice was ineligible to play for Forward Madison FC in the 2023 U.S. Open Cup due to playing in Oakland Roots SC's second round match vs. El Farolito SC.)	9	2	1							9	2	1
29	FW	(United States)	Demitrius Kigeya	0	0	0							0	0	0

=== Goalscorers ===
Rank	Position	Name	USL1 Season	USL1 Playoffs	U.S. Open Cup	Total
1	FW	(United States) Christian Chaney	10	1	0	11
2	FW	(United States) Derek Gebhard	6	0	0	6
3	FW	(South Africa) Nazeem Bartman	5	0	0	5
4	MF	(England) Jayden Onen	3	0	1	4
5	DF	(United States) Stephen Payne	3	0	0	3
6	FW	(Venezuela) Mauro Cichero	2	0	0	2
6	DF	(Austria) Jake Crull	2	0	0	2
6	MF	(England) Aiden Mesias	2	0	0	2
9	MF	(United States) Pierre da Silva	1	0	0	1
9	MF	(United States) Isidro Martinez	1	0	0	1
9	DF	(Australia) Mitch Osmond	1	0	0	1
9	MF	(United States) Wolfgang Prentice	1	0	0	1
9	MF	(Mexico) Tino Vasquez	0	0	1	1
Own goal			1	0	0	1
Total			38	1	2	41

=== Assist scorers ===
Rank	Position	Name	USL1 Season	USL1 Playoffs	U.S. Open Cup	Total
1	MF	(England) Jayden Onen	6	0	1	7
2	DF	(United States) Stephen Payne	4	1	0	5
3	FW	(South Africa) Nazeem Bartman	3	0	0	3
3	FW	(United States) Derek Gebhard	3	0	0	3
3	MF	(United States) Isidro Martinez	3	0	0	3
6	FW	(United States) Christian Chaney	2	0	0	2
6	FW	(Venezuela) Mauro Cichero	1	0	1	2
8	DF	(Austria) Jake Crull	1	0	0	1
8	MF	(United States) Pierre da Silva	1	0	0	1
8	FW	(England) Francis Jno-Baptiste	1	0	0	1
8	MF	(United States) Andrew Wheeler-Omiunu	1	0	0	1
Total			26	1	2	29

=== Clean sheets ===
Rank	Name	USL1 Season	USL1 Playoffs	U.S. Open Cup	Total
1	(Philippines) Bernd Schipmann	12	0	0	12
Total		12	0	0	12

=== Disciplinary record ===
Rank	Position	Name	USL1 Season			USL1 Playoffs			U.S. Open Cup			Total		
Rank	Position	Name	Booked	(yellow card) (yellow-red card)	Sent off (straight red)	Booked	(yellow card) (yellow-red card)	Sent off (straight red)	Booked	(yellow card) (yellow-red card)	Sent off (straight red)	Booked	(yellow card) (yellow-red card)	Sent off (straight red)
1	FW	(United States) Christian Chaney	11	1	0	0	0	0	1	0	0	12	1	0
2	FW	(Venezuela) Mauro Cichero	5	0	2	0	0	0	1	0	0	6	0	2
3	MF	(Uganda) Jayden Onen	7	0	1	0	0	0	0	0	0	7	0	1
4	DF	(United States) Timmy Mehl	5	0	1	1	0	0	0	0	0	6	0	1
5	DF	(United States) Stephen Payne	7	0	0	0	0	0	0	0	0	7	0	0
6	MF	(England) Aiden Mesias	6	0	0	0	0	0	0	0	0	6	0	0
6	DF	(Australia) Mitch Osmond	6	0	0	0	0	0	0	0	0	6	0	0
8	DF	(New Zealand) Sam Brotherton	3	0	1	0	0	0	0	0	0	3	0	1
9	MF	(United States) Isidro Martinez	3	0	0	1	0	0	0	0	0	4	0	0
9	GK	(Philippines) Bernd Schipmann	3	0	0	1	0	0	0	0	0	4	0	0
11	MF	(United States) Eric Conerty	3	0	0	0	0	0	0	0	0	3	0	0
11	DF	(Austria) Jake Crull	2	1	0	0	0	0	0	0	0	2	1	0
11	MF	(United States) Pierre da Silva	3	0	0	0	0	0	0	0	0	3	0	0
11	FW	(United States) Derek Gebhard	3	0	0	0	0	0	0	0	0	3	0	0
11	MF	(United States) Andrew Wheeler-Omiunu	3	0	0	0	0	0	0	0	0	3	0	0
16	FW	(South Africa) Nazeem Bartman	1	0	0	0	0	0	0	0	0	1	0	0
16	DF	(United States) Jason Ramos	1	0	0	0	0	0	0	0	0	1	0	0
Total			68	2	5	3	0	0	2	0	0	73	2	5

== Honors and awards ==
=== USL League One Yearly Awards ===
==== All-League Team ====
Team	Position	Player	Ref.
Second	DF	(Austria) Jake Crull	

=== USL League One Monthly Awards ===
==== Coach of the Month ====
Month	Coach	Ref.
June	(United States) Matt Glaeser	

=== USL League One Weekly Awards ===
==== Player of the Week ====
Week	Position	Player	Ref.
22	FW	(England) Jayden Onen	
24	FW	(United States) Christian Chaney	

==== Goal of the Week ====
Week	Position	Player	Opponent	Ref.
2	FW	(United States) Christian Chaney	Union Omaha	
5	FW	(United States) Christian Chaney	Greenville Triumph SC	
9	MF	(United States) Isidro Martinez	North Carolina FC	
12	FW	(United States) Christian Chaney	Central Valley Fuego FC	
13	DF	(Austria) Jake Crull	North Carolina FC	
15	FW	(South Africa) Nazeem Bartman	Lexington SC	
16	FW	(South Africa) Nazeem Bartman	South Georgia Tormenta FC	
24	FW	(England) Jayden Onen	Central Valley Fuego FC	

==== Save of the Week ====
Week	Player	Opponent	Ref.
5	(Philippines) Bernd Schipmann	Greenville Triumph SC	
9	(Philippines) Bernd Schipmann	North Carolina FC	
10	(Philippines) Bernd Schipmann	Northern Colorado Hailstorm FC	
16	(Philippines) Bernd Schipmann	South Georgia Tormenta FC	
22	(Philippines) Bernd Schipmann	Chattanooga Red Wolves SC	

==== Team of the Week ====
Week	Position	Player	Ref.
2	FW	(United States) Christian Chaney	
2	MF	(United States) Derek Gebhard	
2	Bench	(Austria) Jake Crull	
4	DF	(Austria) Jake Crull	
4	GK	(Philippines) Bernd Schipmann	
5	FW	(United States) Christian Chaney	
5	DF	(Austria) Jake Crull	
5	MF	(United States) Derek Gebhard	
5	GK	(Philippines) Bernd Schipmann	
5	Bench	(Venezuela) Mauro Cichero	
7	MF	(United States) Isidro Martinez	
7	DF	(Australia) Mitch Osmond	
7	Bench	(United States) Derek Gebhard	
7	Bench	(Philippines) Bernd Schipmann	
8	DF	(Austria) Jake Crull	
8	DF	(United States) Timmy Mehl	
9	MF	(United States) Derek Gebhard	
9	MF	(United States) Isidro Martinez	
9	DF	(Australia) Mitch Osmond	
9	Bench	(Austria) Jake Crull	
11	MF	(United States) Stephen Payne	
12	FW	(United States) Christian Chaney	
13	DF	(Austria) Jake Crull	
13	MF	(United States) Isidro Martinez	
13	MF	(United States) Wolfgang Prentice	
13	Bench	(United States) Stephen Payne	
14	DF	(United States) Timmy Mehl	
14	DF	(Australia) Mitch Osmond	
14	MF	(United States) Stephen Payne	
14	Bench	(South Africa) Nazeem Bartman	
14	Bench	(Philippines) Bernd Schipmann	
15	DF	(Austria) Jake Crull	
15	Bench	(United States) Christian Chaney	
16	Bench	(United States) Stephen Payne	
16	Bench	(Philippines) Bernd Schipmann	
17	DF	(Australia) Mitch Osmond	
17	Bench	(Philippines) Bernd Schipmann	
18	Bench	(United States) Derek Gebhard	
20	FW	(United States) Christian Chaney	
22	FW	(England) Jayden Onen	
22	Bench	(Australia) Mitch Osmond	
22	Bench	(United States) Stephen Payne	
23	FW	(United States) Christian Chaney	
24	FW	(United States) Christian Chaney	
24	Bench	(United States) Pierre da Silva	
26	Bench	(Austria) Jake Crull	
27	DF	(Austria) Jake Crull	
27	MF	(United States) Derek Gebhard	
27	Bench	(England) Aiden Mesias	
28	Bench	(Austria) Jake Crull	
