= 2022 Forward Madison FC season =

Forward Madison FC
2022 season
- Owner: Big Top Events
- Chief operating officer: Conor Caloia
- Head coach: Matt Glaeser
- Stadium: Breese Stevens Field
- USL League One: 9th
- USL1 Playoffs: Did not qualify
- U.S. Open Cup: Third Round
- Top goalscorer: League: Jeremiah Streng (7); All: Jeremiah Streng (7)
- Highest home attendance: 4,759 (July 30 vs. Northern Colorado Hailstorm FC)
- Lowest home attendance: 2,605 (April 30 vs. Central Valley Fuego FC)
- Average home league attendance: 3,877
- Biggest win: 3 goals: MAD 3–0 CLE (April 6, USOC)
- Biggest defeat: 4 goals: CLT 6–2 MAD (June 27)
Home colors	Away colors

The 2022 Forward Madison FC season was the fourth season in the soccer team's history, where they compete in USL League One of the third division of American soccer.

== Club ==
=== Roster ===
No.	Pos.	Nat.	Name	Date of birth (age)	Since	On loan from
0	GK	(United States)	Parker Smith	December 31, 2000 (age 25)	2022	
2	DF	(United States)	Cesar Murillo	February 16, 1996 (age 30)	2022	
3	DF	(United States)	Eric Leonard	October 5, 1995 (age 30)	2018	
4	DF	(Australia)	Mitch Osmond	March 11, 1994 (age 32)	2022	
5	DF	(United States)	Christian Dean	March 14, 1993 (age 33)	2022	
6	DF	(Canada)	Mélé Temguia	August 1, 1995 (age 30)	2022	
7	FW	(Senegal)	Abdou Mbacke Thiam	February 3, 1992 (age 34)	2021	
8	MF	(United States)	Drew Conner	February 18, 1994 (age 32)	2022	
9	FW	(Finland)	Jeremiah Streng	November 8, 2001 (age 24)	2022	(Finland) SJK Seinäjoki
10	MF	(Brazil)	Matheus Cassini	February 15, 1996 (age 30)	2022	
11	FW	(Jamaica)	Rojay Smith	September 21, 1996 (age 29)	2022	
13	MF	(United States)	Christian Enriquez	October 25, 1998 (age 27)	2021	
15	DF	(United States)	Mikey Maldonado	July 2, 1998 (age 27)	2022	
16	DF	(Trinidad and Tobago)	Alvin Jones	July 9, 1994 (age 31)	2022	
17	FW	(United States)	Derek Gebhard	October 15, 1995 (age 30)	2021	
18	MF	(United States)	Alann Torres	September 24, 2003 (age 22)	2022	Indy Eleven
19	MF	(United States)	Justin Sukow	September 19, 1998 (age 27)	2021	
21	DF	(United States)	Carl Schneider	November 19, 1992 (age 33)	2022	
24	FW	(South Africa)	Nazeem Bartman	August 13, 1993 (age 32)	2022	
28	MF	(United States)	Andrew Wheeler-Omiunu	December 1, 1992 (age 33)	2022	
29	MF	(United States)	Audi Jepson	August 23, 1994 (age 31)	2021	
47	DF	(United States)	Cyrus Rad	July 10, 1999 (age 26)	2021	
56	GK	(Cuba)	Raiko Arozarena	March 27, 1997 (age 29)	2022	Tampa Bay Rowdies

=== Out on loan ===
No.	Pos.	Nat.	Name	Date of birth (age)	Since	On loan to
1	GK	(United States)	Phil Breno	December 11, 1995 (age 30)	2021	Tampa Bay Rowdies

=== Coaching staff ===
Name	Position
(United States) Matt Glaeser	Head coach and technical director
(United States) Neil Hlavaty	Assistant coach
(United States) Jim Launder	Assistant coach
(United States) John Pascarella	Assistant coach

=== Front office staff ===
Name	Position
(United States) Conor Caloia	Chief operating officer
(United States) Vern Stenman	President
(United States) Keith Tiemeyer	Director of Soccer Operations & Development

== Transfers ==
=== Transfers in ===
Date from	Position	Player	Last team	Type	Ref.
December 28, 2021	FW	(Senegal) Abdou Mbacke Thiam	Louisville City FC	Free transfer	
January 12, 2022	MF	(United States) Andrew Wheeler-Omiunu	Sacramento Republic FC	Free transfer	
January 17, 2022	FW	(Jamaica) Rojay Smith	Sporting Kansas City II	Free transfer	
January 20, 2022	MF	(Brazil) Matheus Cassini	(Bulgaria) POFC Botev Vratsa	Free transfer	
January 27, 2022	DF	(Australia) Mitch Osmond	OKC Energy FC	Free transfer	
February 2, 2022	DF	(United States) Cesar Murillo	Greenville Triumph SC	Free transfer	
March 1, 2022	MF	(United States) Drew Conner	Chicago House AC	Free transfer	
March 4, 2022	DF	(Canada) Mélé Temguia	(Canada) FC Edmonton	Free transfer	
March 14, 2022	DF	(United States) Mikey Maldonado	North Texas SC	Free transfer	
March 16, 2022	FW	(South Africa) Nazeem Bartman	Chicago House AC	Free transfer	
March 18, 2022	FW	(Finland) Jeremiah Streng	(Finland) SJK Seinäjoki	Loan	
March 22, 2022	MF	(United States) Alann Torres	Indy Eleven	Loan	
March 24, 2022	DF	(Trinidad and Tobago) Alvin Jones		Signed	
March 29, 2022	DF	(United States) Carl Schneider	Michigan Stars FC	Free transfer	
March 30, 2022	GK	(United States) Parker Smith	Kalamazoo FC	Free transfer	
May 17, 2022	GK	(United States) Taylor Bailey	Oakland Roots SC	Loan	
June 10, 2022	DF	(United States) Christian Dean	Bay Cities FC	Paid transfer	
July 12, 2022	GK	(Cuba) Raiko Arozarena	Tampa Bay Rowdies	Loan	

=== Transfers out ===
Date from	Position	Player	To	Type	Ref.
November 30, 2021	DF	(Mexico) Christian Díaz		Released	
November 30, 2021	MF	(United States) Taner Dogan	(Republic of Ireland) Dundalk F.C.	End of loan	
November 30, 2021	GK	(United States) Aidan Hogan		Released	
November 30, 2021	MF	(United States) Jesús Pérez	(Republic of Ireland) Dundalk F.C.	End of loan	
November 30, 2021	FW	(United States) Ryan Sierakowski	New England Revolution II	End of loan	
November 30, 2021	DF	(Trinidad and Tobago) Josiah Trimmingham		Released	
December 21, 2021	FW	(United States) Jake Keegan	Greenville Triumph SC	Free transfer	
January 11, 2022	MF	(Republic of Ireland) Aaron Molloy	Memphis 901 FC	Buyout clause exercised	
January 27, 2022	MF	(Spain) Carlos Gómez	(Spain) CD Marchamalo	Free transfer	
February 2, 2022	MF	(United States) Tyler Allen	FC Tucson	Free transfer	
February 3, 2022	DF	(United States) Connor Tobin		Released	
February 18, 2022	FW	(United States) Noah Fuson	Columbus Crew 2	Free transfer	
February 18, 2022	MF	(United States) Michael Vang	Columbus Crew 2	Free transfer	
February 24, 2022	DF	(United States) Gustavo Fernandes	North Carolina FC	Free transfer	
March 1, 2022	MF	(Panama) Jiro Barriga Toyama	Monterey Bay F.C.	Free transfer	
June 6, 2022	DF	(United States) Heath Martin	One Knoxville SC	Free transfer	
June 9, 2022	GK	(United States) Taylor Bailey	Oakland Roots SC	End of loan	
July 12, 2022	GK	(United States) Phil Breno	Tampa Bay Rowdies	Loan	

== Kits ==
- Shirt sponsor: Dairyland Insurance
- Sleeve sponsor: Just Coffee Cooperative
- Shirt manufacturer: Hummel

Home
Away

== Exhibitions ==
February 26, 2022 Preseason 1	Marquette Golden Eagles	0–2	Forward Madison FC	Milwaukee, Wisconsin
5:30 PM CST	Andrade (yellow card) 70'		Bartman 28' (Trialist); Leonard 60' (Jepson); Trialist (yellow card) 72'; Trialist (yellow card) 86'	Stadium: Valley Fields

March 4, 2022 Preseason 2	Northern Illinois Huskies	0–3	Forward Madison FC	Loves Park, Illinois
3:00 PM CST	Eberman (yellow card) 47'		Leonard 45+1' (Sukow); Wheeler-Omiunu (yellow card) 47'; Murillo 62' (Trialist); Trialist 74' (Cassini); Schneider (yellow card) 89'	Stadium: Dimke Field at Mercyhealth Sportscore Two
Note: Neutral field

March 11, 2022 Preseason 3	Minnesota United FC 2	2–1	Forward Madison FC	Saint Paul, Minnesota
1:00 PM CST	53'; 65'		Bartman 43' (R. Smith); Schneider (yellow card)	Stadium: National Sports Center
Note: Closed to the public

March 19, 2022 Preseason 4	Forward Madison FC	4–1	Chicago Fire FC II	Madison, Wisconsin
2:00 PM CDT	Wheeler-Omiunu 52'; Sukow 63' (pen.); Maldonado 70', 78'		78'	Stadium: Breese Stevens Field
Note: Closed to the public

March 26, 2022 Preseason 5	Forward Madison FC	Cancelled	Bavarian United SC	Madison, Wisconsin
1:00 PM CDT				Stadium: Breese Stevens Field
Note: Cancelled due to unsafe playing conditions caused by weather

April 23, 2022 Midseason 1	Forward Madison FC	1–1	Wisconsin Badgers	Madison, Wisconsin
7:00 PM CDT	Mbacke Thiam 50'; Maldonado (yellow card) 80'	Report	Finnegan 42'; Calkap (yellow card) 68'	Stadium: Breese Stevens Field

June 16, 2022 Midseason 2	Forward Madison FC (United States)	1–2	(Germany) SC Paderborn 07	Madison, Wisconsin
7:00 PM CDT	Osmond (yellow card) 25'; Streng 90+1'	Report	Heuer (yellow card) 25'; Iredale 64'; Conteh 82' (Ofori)	Stadium: Breese Stevens Field; Attendance: 3,313
Note: Game was postponed from its original date of June 15th due to inclement weather.

July 20, 2022 Midseason 3	Forward Madison FC (United States)	2–2	(Mexico) Pumas Tabasco	Madison, Wisconsin
7:00 PM CDT	Sukow (yellow card) 18'; Streng 27' (Jones); Enriquez (yellow card) 28'; R. Smith 29' (Streng); Murillo (yellow card) 80'; Bartman (yellow card) 83'	Report	Machado 19'; Rosales (yellow card) 39'; D.López (yellow card) 45+1'; Gallegos (yellow card) 45+2'; Miguel (yellow card) 52'; Islas (yellow card) 54'; Durán 84'; Freyfeld (yellow card) 85'	Stadium: Breese Stevens Field; Attendance: 3,712

== Competitions ==
=== Overview ===
Competition	First match	Last match	Starting round	Final position	Record							
Competition	First match	Last match	Starting round	Final position	Pld	W	D	L	GF	GA	GD	Win %
USL League One	April 2, 2022	October 15, 2022	Matchday 1	9th	30	7	12	11	34	44	−10	23.33
U.S. Open Cup	April 6, 2022	April 20, 2022	Second round	Third round	2	1	0	1	3	2	+1	50.00
Total					32	8	12	12	37	46	−9	25.00

Source: Competitions

=== USL League One ===
==== Standings ====
Pos	Team	Pld	W	L	T	GF	GA	GD	Pts
7	Northern Colorado Hailstorm FC	30	11	10	9	42	38	+4	42
8	Central Valley Fuego FC	30	11	12	7	37	40	−3	40
9	Forward Madison FC	30	7	11	12	34	44	−10	33
10	FC Tucson	30	8	14	8	34	44	−10	32
11	North Carolina FC	30	8	16	6	35	53	−18	30

Source: USL League One
Rules for classification: 1) points; 2) total wins; 3) total goal differential; 4) total goals scored; 5) points earned against top four Conference finishers; 6) disciplinary points; 7) drawing of lots.

==== Results summary ====
Overall								Home						Away					
Pld	W	D	L	GF	GA	GD	Pts	W	D	L	GF	GA	GD	W	D	L	GF	GA	GD
30	7	12	11	34	44	−10	33	4	5	6	17	20	−3	3	7	5	17	24	−7

Source: USL League One

==== Results by round ====
Round	1	2	3	4	5	6	7	8	9	10	11	12	13	14	15	16	17	18	19	20	21	22	23	24	25	26	27	28	29	30
Stadium	A	H	A	H	A	A	H	A	H	H	A	H	A	A	H	H	H	A	A	H	A	H	A	A	H	H	A	H	H	A
Result	D	D	D	L	W	L	L	D	W	W	D	W	L	W	W	D	D	D	L	D	W	D	L	D	L	L	L	L	L	D
Position	6	6	10	11	9	10	11	11	9	8	8	7	9	5	3	3	4	5	6	7	4	5	6	6	9	9	9	9	9	9

Source: USL League One
A = Away; H = Home; W = Win; D = Draw; L = Loss

==== Matches ====
April 2, 2022 1	Chattanooga Red Wolves SC	1–1	Forward Madison FC	East Ridge, Tennessee
7:30 PM EDT	Benton (yellow card) 19'; Villalobos 40'; Bement (yellow card) 74'; P. Hernandez (yellow card) 90'	Report	Murillo (yellow card) 47'; Gebhard (yellow card) 68'; Wheeler-Omiunu (yellow card) 76'; Bartman 90+5'	Stadium: CHI Memorial Stadium; Attendance: 2,618; Referee: Benjamin Meyer

April 9, 2022 2	Forward Madison FC	2–2	Union Omaha	Madison, Wisconsin
7:00 PM CDT	Bartman (yellow card) 26'; Wheeler-Omiunu (yellow card) 30'; Jepson 36' (pen.); Leonard (yellow card) 38'; Maldonado (yellow card) 57'; Streng 70'	Report	Kametani 15' (Meza); Scearce 45+3' (Doyle); Doyle (yellow card) 47'; Brito (yellow card) 67'	Stadium: Breese Stevens Field; Attendance: 2,691; Referee: Esad Omanovic

April 16, 2022 3	FC Tucson	1–1	Forward Madison FC	Tucson, Arizona
7:00 PM MST	Perez (yellow card) 67'; Crull 81' (Perez), (yellow card) 83'; Corfe (yellow card) 90+3'	Report	Bartman (yellow card) 10'; Rad (yellow card) 35' (yellow-red card) 63'; Enriquez 54' (Wheeler-Omiunu); Wheeler-Omiunu (yellow card) 88'; Maldonado (yellow card) 90+2'	Stadium: Kino North Stadium; Attendance: 1,482; Referee: Corbyn May

April 30, 2022 4	Forward Madison FC	0–1	Central Valley Fuego FC	Madison, Wisconsin
5:00 PM CDT	Maldonado (yellow card) 27'; Leonard (yellow card) 44'; Bartman (yellow card) 90+6'	Report	Ramos (yellow card) 36'; Partida (yellow card) 51', (goal) 54'; Schenfeld (yellow card) 61'; Dulysse (yellow card) 81'; Smith (yellow card) 82'; Antman (yellow card) 87'	Stadium: Breese Stevens Field; Attendance: 2,605; Referee: Jervis Atagana

May 7, 2022 5	Richmond Kickers	0–1	Forward Madison FC	Richmond, Virginia
6:00 PM EDT	Terzaghi (yellow card) 33'; Crisler (yellow card) 36'; Vinyals (yellow card) 45+2'; Aune (yellow card) 63'	Report	Cassini (yellow card) 9'; Jones (yellow card) 14'; Murillo (yellow card) 19'; Osmond (yellow card) 53'; Crisler 67' (o.g.); Breno (yellow card) 90+1'	Stadium: City Stadium; Attendance: 2,135; Referee: Nickrod Fateh

May 13, 2022 6	Greenville Triumph SC	2–0	Forward Madison FC	Greenville, South Carolina
7:00 PM EDT	Walker 28' (Gavilanes); Gavilanes 35' (Walker)	Report	Maldonado (yellow card) 37'; Cassini (yellow card) 43'; Sukow (yellow card) 66'	Stadium: Triumph Stadium at Legacy Early College; Referee: Alyssa Nichols

May 21, 2022 7	Forward Madison FC	1–2	Charlotte Independence	Madison, Wisconsin
7:00 PM CDT	Bartman 76' (Rad)	Report	Luquetta 7' (Santos); Dimick (yellow card) 21'; McNeill 60'; Ibarra (yellow card) 90+1'; Barber (yellow card) 90+3'	Stadium: Breese Stevens Field; Attendance: 3,968; Referee: Austin Saini

May 28, 2022 8	Central Valley Fuego FC	1–1	Forward Madison FC	Fresno, California
7:30 PM PDT	Smith (yellow card) 79'; Dieye (yellow card) 81'; Bijev 90+2' (Casillas)	Report	Conner (yellow card) 41'; Leonard (yellow card) 56'; Streng 82'; Bartman (yellow card) 90'	Stadium: Fresno State Soccer Stadium; Referee: Karen Callado

June 4, 2022 9	Forward Madison FC	2–1	FC Tucson	Madison, Wisconsin
7:00 PM CDT	Osmond (yellow card) 19'; Bartman 29' (Maldonado); Mbacke Thiam 50' (Bartman), (yellow card) 69'; Conner (yellow card) 63'; Wheeler-Omiunu (yellow card) 65'	Report	Fahling (yellow card) 14'; Moss (yellow card) 20'; Allen (yellow card) 28'; Machell 41' (L. Perez); F. Pérez (yellow card) 52'; Bedoya (yellow card) 83'; L. Perez (yellow card) 87'	Stadium: Breese Stevens Field; Attendance: 3,070; Referee: Wes Caouette

June 11, 2022 10	Forward Madison FC	3–2	Greenville Triumph SC	Madison, Wisconsin
7:00 PM CDT	Cassini 2' (Maldonado), 62' (Gebhard); Conner (yellow card) 10'; Shultz 49' (o.g.); Rad (yellow card) 53'; Maldonado (yellow card) 56'	Report	Labovitz 40' (Ibarra), 73' (Evans), (yellow card) 69'	Stadium: Breese Stevens Field; Attendance: 3,190; Referee: Esad Omanovic

June 19, 2022 11	South Georgia Tormenta FC	2–2	Forward Madison FC	Statesboro, Georgia
7:30 PM EDT	Dengler 13' (Billhardt), (yellow card) 90+3'; Adeniyi (yellow card) 32'; Adjei 86' (Dengler); Nembhard (yellow card) 90+4'	Report	Dean (yellow card) 41'; Torres (yellow card) 51'; Maldonado 56' (Torres); R. Smith 82' (Maldonado); Rad (yellow card) 88'	Stadium: Optim Health System Field; Attendance: 937; Referee: Abdou Ndiaye

June 23, 2022 12	Forward Madison FC	2–1	Richmond Kickers	Madison, Wisconsin
7:00 PM CDT	Mbacke Thiam (yellow card) 35'; Streng 79' (Cassini); Cassini 82' (Rad), (yellow card) 83'; Dean (yellow card) 89'	Report	Crisler (yellow card) 36'; Vinyals 45+3' (Bolanos); Gordon (yellow card) 65'; Ritchie (yellow card) 76'; Bentley (yellow card) 77'; Morán (yellow card) 82'	Stadium: Breese Stevens Field; Attendance: 4,082; Referee: Brian Wood

June 26, 2022 13	Charlotte Independence	6–2	Forward Madison FC	Charlotte, North Carolina
6:00 PM EDT	Mbuyu 9'; Maya (yellow card) 14'; Obertan 22' (Ciss); Shevtsov 28' (Obertan); Ibarra (yellow card) 39'; Ciss 58' (Mbuyu); Talboys 69' (Ibarra); Barber (yellow card) 84'; Bennett 90' (Barber)	Report	Wheeler-Omiunu (yellow card) 35'; Streng 37' (Wheeler-Omiunu), (yellow card) 82'; Maldonado (yellow card) 39'; R. Smith 64' (Leonard); Cassini (yellow card) 68'; Dean (yellow card) 82'; Temguia (yellow card) 90+5'	Stadium: American Legion Memorial Stadium; Attendance: 2,754; Referee: William Steffen

July 5, 2022 14	Northern Colorado Hailstorm FC	1–2	Forward Madison FC	Fort Collins, Colorado
7:00 PM MDT	Desdunes 28' (Parra); Parra (yellow card) 45+4'; Cornwall (yellow card) 46'; Folla (yellow card) 58'; Nortey (yellow card) 85'	Report	Wheeler-Omiunu 8' (Jones); Maldonado (yellow card) 18'; Jones (yellow card) 24'; Torres 44' (Rad); Cassini (yellow card) 79'; Osmond (yellow card) 90+6'	Stadium: Canvas Stadium; Attendance: 683; Referee: Adam Zarrin

July 16, 2022 15	Forward Madison FC	2–0	South Georgia Tormenta FC	Madison, Wisconsin
7:00 PM CDT	Wheeler-Omiunu (yellow card) 58'; R. Smith 76' (Cassini); Cassini 86' (Conner)	Report	Dengler (yellow card) 70'	Stadium: Breese Stevens Field; Attendance: 4,304; Referee: Alex Beehler

July 26, 2022 16	Forward Madison FC	0–0	Union Omaha	Madison, Wisconsin
7:00 PM CDT	Rad (yellow card) 12'; Torres (yellow card) 36'; Wheeler-Omiunu (yellow card) 75'; Maldonado (yellow card) 80'	Report	Bawa (yellow card) 35'; Meza (yellow card) 37'; Brito (yellow card) 43'; Touche (yellow card) 64'; Gil (yellow card) 69'	Stadium: Breese Stevens Field; Attendance: 4,695; Referee: Rebeca Pagan

July 30, 2022 17	Forward Madison FC	1–1	Northern Colorado Hailstorm FC	Madison, Wisconsin
7:00 PM CDT	Streng (yellow card) 4'; Cassini (yellow card) 57'; R. Smith 63' (Gebhard)	Report	Parra 29' (Rogers); Scally (yellow card) 58'; Damm (yellow card) 85'; Norman (yellow card) 89'	Stadium: Breese Stevens Field; Attendance: 4,759; Referee: Kevin Fikar

August 5, 2022 18	Charlotte Independence	0–0	Forward Madison FC	Charlotte, North Carolina
7:00 PM EDT	Mbuyu (yellow card) 52'; Dutey (yellow card) 58'; Barber (yellow card) 90+7'	Report	Streng (yellow card) 12'; Torres (yellow card) 65'	Stadium: American Legion Memorial Stadium; Attendance: 1,534; Referee: Luis Arroyo

August 10, 2022 19	North Carolina FC	2–1	Forward Madison FC	Cary, North Carolina
7:00 PM EDT	Somersall (yellow card) 35'; McLaughlin 47' (pen.); Lue Young 90+7' (Anderson)	Report	Leonard (yellow card) 5'; Mbacke Thiam 24'; Maldonado (yellow card) 28' (yellow-red card) 86'	Stadium: WakeMed Soccer Park; Attendance: 1,034; Referee: Shawn Tehini

August 13, 2022 20	Forward Madison FC	1–1	Chattanooga Red Wolves SC	Madison, Wisconsin
7:00 PM CDT	Jones (yellow card) 48', (goal) 90+5' (Streng); Leonard (yellow card) 54'; Mbacke Thiam (yellow card) 59'	Report	Benton (yellow card) 16'; Galindrez 17'; Ortiz (yellow card) 62'	Stadium: Breese Stevens Field; Attendance: 4,196; Referee: Chris Ruska

August 20, 2022 21	Northern Colorado Hailstorm FC	1–3	Forward Madison FC	Severance, Colorado
7:00 PM MDT	Parra 14' (pen.), (yellow card) 45+2'; Folla (red card) 38'; Desdunes (yellow card) 51'; Prentice (yellow card) 80'; Amann (red card) 83'; Cornwall (red card) 87'; Norman (yellow card) 89'	Report	Osmond (yellow card) 13'; Torres (yellow card) 21'; Gebhard 29' (Wheeler-Omiunu); Streng 65' (Rad), 82' (Cassini); Cassini (yellow card) 71'	Stadium: Severance High School; Attendance: 585; Referee: Jervis Atagana

August 24, 2022 22	Forward Madison FC	0–0	North Carolina FC	Madison, Wisconsin
7:00 PM CDT	Osmond (yellow card) 36'; Maldonado (yellow card) 57'; Torres (yellow card) 73'; Streng (yellow card) 90+2'	Report	Flick (yellow card) 68'; Fernandes (yellow card) 73'; Anderson (yellow card) 81'	Stadium: Breese Stevens Field; Attendance: 4,065; Referee: Alex Beehler

August 31, 2022 23	Union Omaha	1–0	Forward Madison FC	Papillion, Nebraska
7:00 PM CDT	Alihodžić (red card) 50'; Hertzog 77' (Knutson); Doyle (yellow card) 90'	Report	Mbacke Thiam (yellow card) 45+3'; R. Smith (yellow card) 89'	Stadium: Werner Park; Referee: Velimir Stefanovic

September 3, 2022 24	Greenville Triumph SC	2–2	Forward Madison FC	Greenville, South Carolina
7:00 PM EDT	Brown 17' (Waldeck); Gavilanes 69' (Labovitz); Walker (yellow card) 72'; Labovitz (yellow card) 85'	Report	Osmond (yellow card) 13'; Bartman 22' (Cassini); Cassini (yellow card) 39'; Rad (yellow card) 62'; Streng 90+5' (Maldonado)	Stadium: Triumph Stadium at Legacy Early College; Attendance: 2,137; Referee: Emma Richards

September 10, 2022 25	Forward Madison FC	2–5	Chattanooga Red Wolves SC	Madison, Wisconsin
7:00 PM CDT	Temguia 38' (Mbacke Thiam), (yellow card) 75'; Bartman (yellow card) 56'; Maldonado 62'; Conner (yellow card) 87'	Report	Cardona 13' (Lombardi); Lombardi (yellow card) 18'; Navarro 23' (Ortiz), (yellow card) 25'; Ortiz 30'; Tejera 36' (España); Kraft (yellow card) 70'; Villalobos (yellow card) 86'; Galindrez 88'	Stadium: Breese Stevens Field; Attendance: 3,957; Referee: Kevin Fikar

September 17, 2022 26	Forward Madison FC	1–2	North Carolina FC	Madison, Wisconsin
5:00 PM CDT	Murillo (yellow card) 13'; Osmond (yellow card) 18'; Gebhard (yellow card) 45+4'; Maldonado (yellow card) 50'; Bartman 81' (Cassini); Rad (yellow card) 90+2'	Report	McLaughlin 4' (Tahir); Fernandes (yellow card) 24'; Adams 90+3'	Stadium: Breese Stevens Field; Attendance: 4,456; Referee: Joshua Encarnación

September 21, 2022 27	Central Valley Fuego FC	3–0	Forward Madison FC	Fresno, California
7:30 PM PDT	Chaney 9'; Ramos (yellow card) 51'; Dieye 82' (Villarreal), 90+2' (Cerritos)	Report	Conner (yellow card) 36' (yellow-red card) 73'; Cassini (red card) 50'	Stadium: Fresno State Soccer Stadium; Attendance: 1,078; Referee: Karen Callado

September 24, 2022 28	Forward Madison FC	0–1	South Georgia Tormenta FC	Madison, Wisconsin
7:00 PM CDT	Rad (yellow card) 15'; Torres (yellow card) 21'; Mbacke Thiam (yellow card) 26' (yellow-red card) 46'; Wheeler-Omiunu (yellow card) 34'	Report	Nembhard (yellow card) 41'; Phelps 49'	Stadium: Breese Stevens Field; Attendance: 3,619; Referee: Jervis Atagana

October 8, 2022 29	Forward Madison FC	0–1	Richmond Kickers	Madison, Wisconsin
7:00 PM CDT		Report	Gordon 35' (Bryant); Fitch (yellow card) 87'	Stadium: Breese Stevens Field; Attendance: 4,492; Referee: Luis Arroyo

October 15, 2022 30	FC Tucson	1–1	Forward Madison FC	Tucson, Arizona
7:00 PM MST	Machell (yellow card) 45+1'; Delgado 46'; Perez (yellow card) 90+3'	Report	Cassini 28' (Rad); Maldonado (yellow card) 51'; Arozarena (yellow card) 60'; Osmond (yellow card) 80'	Stadium: Kino North Stadium; Attendance: 1,388; Referee: Kelsey Harms

=== U.S. Open Cup ===
As a member of USL League One, Forward Madison FC entered the 2022 U.S. Open Cup in the second round.

April 6, 2022 Second round	Forward Madison FC (Wisconsin)	3–0	(Ohio) Cleveland SC	Madison, Wisconsin
7:00 PM CDT	Sukow 37' (Torres); Murillo 45+1' (Rad), (yellow card) 63'; Bartman 68'; Torres (yellow card) 90'	Report	Brennan (yellow card) 57'; Harter (yellow card) 75'	Stadium: Breese Stevens Field; Referee: Calin Radosav

April 20, 2022 Third round	Forward Madison FC (Wisconsin)	0–2	Minnesota United FC	Madison, Wisconsin
6:00 PM CDT	Maldonado (yellow card) 22'; Murillo (yellow card) 45+3'; Streng (yellow card) 63'; Osmond (yellow card) 72'; Conner (red card) 84'	Report	Kallman (yellow card) 45+3', (goal) 83' (Rosales); Hayes (yellow card) 54'; Hunou 51' (Rosales); Gasper (yellow card) 87'; Fragapane (yellow card) 90+3'	Stadium: Breese Stevens Field; Attendance: 2,663; Referee: Jervis Atagana

== Statistics ==
=== Appearances and goals ===
No.	Pos.	Nat.	Name	USL1 Season			U.S. Open Cup			Total		
No.	Pos.	Nat.	Name	Apps	Starts	Goals	Apps	Starts	Goals	Apps	Starts	Goals
0	GK	(United States)	Parker Smith	1	1	0	0	0	0	1	1	0
2	DF	(United States)	Cesar Murillo	15	7	0	2	2	1	17	9	1
3	DF	(United States)	Eric Leonard	29	27	0	2	1	0	31	28	0
4	DF	(Australia)	Mitch Osmond	27	27	0	1	1	0	28	28	0
5	DF	(United States)	Christian Dean	10	6	0	0	0	0	10	6	0
6	DF	(Canada)	Mélé Temguia	16	3	1	0	0	0	16	3	1
7	FW	(Senegal)	Abdou Mbacke Thiam	26	23	2	1	0	0	27	23	2
8	MF	(United States)	Drew Conner	18	11	0	1	0	0	19	11	0
9	FW	(Finland)	Jeremiah Streng	30	13	7	2	1	0	32	14	7
10	MF	(Brazil)	Matheus Cassini	26	19	5	2	1	0	28	20	5
11	FW	(Jamaica)	Rojay Smith	25	11	4	2	2	0	27	13	4
13	MF	(United States)	Christian Enriquez	12	6	1	2	2	0	14	8	1
15	DF	(United States)	Mikey Maldonado	28	28	2	2	1	0	30	29	2
16	DF	(Trinidad and Tobago)	Alvin Jones	17	12	1	1	0	0	18	12	1
17	FW	(United States)	Derek Gebhard	24	21	1	0	0	0	24	21	1
18	MF	(United States)	Alann Torres	19	11	1	1	1	0	20	12	1
19	MF	(United States)	Justin Sukow	24	5	0	2	1	1	26	6	1
21	DF	(United States)	Carl Schneider	0	0	0	1	1	0	1	1	0
24	FW	(South Africa)	Nazeem Bartman	25	18	5	2	1	1	27	19	6
28	MF	(United States)	Andrew Wheeler-Omiunu	27	27	1	2	1	0	29	28	1
29	MF	(United States)	Audi Jepson	5	5	1	2	2	0	7	7	1
47	DF	(United States)	Cyrus Rad	28	22	0	1	1	0	29	23	0
56	GK	(Cuba)	Raiko Arozarena	16	16	0	0	0	0	16	16	0
Players who left Forward Madison FC during the season
1	GK	(United States)	Phil Breno	12	12	0	2	2	0	14	14	0
23	DF	(United States)	Heath Martin	0	0	0	1	1	0	1	1	0
27	GK	(United States)	Taylor Bailey	1	1	0	0	0	0	1	1	0

=== Goalscorers ===
Rank	Position	Name	USL1 Season	U.S. Open Cup	Total
1	FW	(Finland) Jeremiah Streng	7	0	7
2	FW	(South Africa) Nazeem Bartman	5	1	6
3	MF	(Brazil) Matheus Cassini	5	0	5
4	FW	(Jamaica) Rojay Smith	4	0	4
5	DF	(United States) Mikey Maldonado	2	0	2
5	FW	(Senegal) Abdou Mbacke Thiam	2	0	2
7	MF	(United States) Christian Enriquez	1	0	1
7	FW	(United States) Derek Gebhard	1	0	1
7	MF	(United States) Audi Jepson	1	0	1
7	DF	(Trinidad and Tobago) Alvin Jones	1	0	1
7	DF	(United States) Cesar Murillo	0	1	1
7	MF	(United States) Justin Sukow	0	1	1
7	DF	(Canada) Mélé Temguia	1	0	1
7	MF	(United States) Alann Torres	1	0	1
7	MF	(United States) Andrew Wheeler-Omiunu	1	0	1
Own goal			2	0	2
Total			34	3	37

=== Assist scorers ===
Rank	Position	Name	USL1 Season	U.S. Open Cup	Total
1	DF	(United States) Cyrus Rad	5	1	6
2	MF	(Brazil) Matheus Cassini	5	0	5
3	DF	(United States) Mikey Maldonado	4	0	4
4	MF	(United States) Andrew Wheeler-Omiunu	3	0	3
5	FW	(United States) Derek Gebhard	2	0	2
5	MF	(United States) Alann Torres	1	1	2
7	FW	(South Africa) Nazeem Bartman	1	0	1
7	MF	(United States) Drew Conner	1	0	1
7	DF	(Trinidad and Tobago) Alvin Jones	1	0	1
7	DF	(United States) Eric Leonard	1	0	1
7	FW	(Senegal) Abdou Mbacke Thiam	1	0	1
7	FW	(Finland) Jeremiah Streng	1	0	1
Total			26	2	28

=== Clean sheets ===
Rank	Name	USL1 Season	U.S. Open Cup	Total
1	(Cuba) Raiko Arozarena	4	0	4
2	(United States) Phil Breno	1	1	2
Total		5	1	6

=== Disciplinary record ===
Rank	Position	Name	USL1 Season			U.S. Open Cup			Total		
Rank	Position	Name	Booked	(yellow card) (yellow-red card)	Sent off (straight red)	Booked	(yellow card) (yellow-red card)	Sent off (straight red)	Booked	(yellow card) (yellow-red card)	Sent off (straight red)
1	DF	(United States) Mikey Maldonado	11	1	0	1	0	0	12	1	0
2	MF	(Brazil) Matheus Cassini	8	0	1	0	0	0	8	0	1
3	DF	(Australia) Mitch Osmond	8	0	0	1	0	0	9	0	0
4	MF	(United States) Drew Conner	4	1	0	0	0	1	4	1	1
4	DF	(United States) Cyrus Rad	6	1	0	0	0	0	6	1	0
4	MF	(United States) Andrew Wheeler-Omiunu	8	0	0	0	0	0	8	0	0
7	MF	(United States) Alann Torres	6	0	0	1	0	0	7	0	0
8	FW	(Senegal) Abdou Mbacke Thiam	4	1	0	0	0	0	4	1	0
9	FW	(South Africa) Nazeem Bartman	5	0	0	0	0	0	5	0	0
9	DF	(United States) Eric Leonard	5	0	0	0	0	0	5	0	0
9	DF	(United States) Cesar Murillo	3	0	0	2	0	0	5	0	0
9	FW	(Finland) Jeremiah Streng	4	0	0	1	0	0	5	0	0
13	DF	(United States) Christian Dean	3	0	0	0	0	0	3	0	0
13	DF	(Trinidad and Tobago) Alvin Jones	3	0	0	0	0	0	3	0	0
15	FW	(United States) Derek Gebhard	2	0	0	0	0	0	2	0	0
15	DF	(Canada) Mélé Temguia	2	0	0	0	0	0	2	0	0
17	GK	(Cuba) Raiko Arozarena	1	0	0	0	0	0	1	0	0
17	GK	(United States) Phil Breno	1	0	0	0	0	0	1	0	0
17	FW	(Jamaica) Rojay Smith	1	0	0	0	0	0	1	0	0
17	MF	(United States) Justin Sukow	1	0	0	0	0	0	1	0	0
Total			86	4	1	6	0	1	92	4	2

== Honors and awards ==
=== USL League One Yearly Awards ===
==== All-League Team ====
Team	Position	Player	Ref.
Second	DF	(United States) Mikey Maldonado	

=== USL League One Weekly Awards ===
==== Player of the Week ====
Week	Position	Player	Ref.
6	GK	(United States) Phil Breno	
10	FW	(South Africa) Nazeem Bartman	
12	MF	(United States) Mikey Maldonado	

==== Save of the Week ====
Week	Player	Opponent	Ref.
3	(United States) Phil Breno	FC Tucson	
6	(United States) Phil Breno	Richmond Kickers	

==== Team of the Week ====
Week	Position	Player	Ref.
1	DF	(Australia) Mitch Osmond	
2	MF	(United States) Audi Jepson	
3	MF	(United States) Andrew Wheeler-Omiunu	
6	GK	(United States) Phil Breno	
6	DF	(Australia) Mitch Osmond	
8	DF	(United States) Cyrus Rad	
10	FW	(South Africa) Nazeem Bartman	
10	MF	(United States) Mikey Maldonado	
11	FW	(Brazil) Matheus Cassini	
12	MF	(United States) Mikey Maldonado	
13	DF	(United States) Eric Leonard	
15	DF	(United States) Cyrus Rad	
15	MF	(United States) Alann Torres	
16	GK	(Cuba) Raiko Arozarena	
16	MF	(Brazil) Matheus Cassini	
18	GK	(Cuba) Raiko Arozarena	
18	DF	(Australia) Mitch Osmond	
20	MF	(Trinidad and Tobago) Alvin Jones	
20	DF	(United States) Cyrus Rad	
21	DF	(United States) Derek Gebhard	
21	DF	(United States) Cyrus Rad	
21	FW	(Finland) Jeremiah Streng	
24	MF	(United States) Mikey Maldonado	
29	DF	(United States) Cyrus Rad	
