= Junaid Sait =

South African soccer player

Personal information
- Full name: Junaid Sait
- Date of birth: 24 May 1993 (age 33)
- Place of birth: South Africa
- Position: Centre back

Team information
- Current team: Moroka Swallows
- Number: 34

Youth career
- 2000–2005: Matroosfontein FC
- 2005–2007: Old Mutual FC
- 2007–2011: Stars of Africa Academy
- 2011–2012: Milano United

Senior career*
Years	Team	Apps	(Gls)
2012–2014	Milano United	37	(3)
2014–2015	Falkenbergs FF	0	(0)
2015–2016	Milano United	21	(4)
2016–2017	Stellenbosch	25	(1)
2017–2018	Ajax Cape Town	3	(0)
2019	Richards Bay	15	(1)
2020–	Cape Umoya United	12	(0)
2020–	Moroka Swallows	58	(1)
- * Club domestic league appearances and goals as of 8 August 2024

Junaid Sait (born 24 May 1993) is a South African soccer player who plays for Moroka Swallows as a defender.
