= Jarrod Moroole =

South African soccer player

Personal information
- Full name: Jarrod Aidan Moroole
- Date of birth: 9 October 1991 (age 35)
- Position: Defender

Team information
- Current team: Cape Town Spurs
- Number: 6

Youth career
- Ajax Cape Town

Senior career*
Years	Team	Apps	(Gls)
- Old Mutual
2012–2016	FC Cape Town	70	(7)
2016	Vasco da Gama	9	(1)
2016–2020	Stellenbosch	100	(8)
2020–2021	Cape Town All Stars	19	(0)
2021–	Cape Town Spurs	101	(5)
- * Club domestic league appearances and goals as of 15 June 2024

Jarrod Moroole (born 9 October 1991) is a South African soccer player who plays as a defender for Cape Town Spurs in the Premier Soccer League.

Moroole spent his early career in the academy of Ajax Cape Town as well as playing for Old Mutual. He played several years in the National First Division, first for F.C. Cape Town, then for Vasco da Gama and its successor Stellenbosch. He captained Stellenbosch as the team won promotion from the 2018-19 National First Division. He made his South African first-tier debut in the 2019-20 Premier Soccer League.

After spending one season in Cape Town All Stars, he was signed by Cape Town Spurs in 2021. Moroole helped win promotion to the first tier again, this time from the 2022-23 National First Division. In 2023, Moroole notably scored the winning goal as Cape Town Spurs upset Orlando Pirates 2–1 in the Premier Division.
