= Francis Jno-Baptiste =

English association football player

Personal information
- Full name: Francis Jno-Baptiste
- Date of birth: 8 November 1999 (age 27)
- Place of birth: Newham, England
- Height: 1.75 m (5 ft 9 in)
- Position: Forward

Team information
- Current team: Naxxar Lions

Youth career
- 2012–2019: Crystal Palace

Senior career*
Years	Team	Apps	(Gls)
2019–2022	Östersund	32	(5)
2020	→ AFC Eskilstuna (loan)	9	(3)
2022	Chesham United	16	(2)
2022	Brightlingsea Regent	6	(0)
2023	Bowers & Pitsea	1	(1)
2023	Forward Madison	14	(0)
2024–	Naxxar Lions	0	(0)
- * Club domestic league appearances and goals as of 22:32, 16 October 2023 (UTC)

Francis Jno-Baptiste (born 8 November 1999) is an English professional footballer who plays as a forward for Naxxar Lions.

== Career ==
In January 2019, having spent six years at the Crystal Palace academy, Jno-Baptiste joined Allsvenskan side Östersund, signing a three-and-a-half-year deal. On 23 February 2019, he made his senior debut for Östersund in the Svenska Cupen, playing the final 18 minutes during a 3–2 loss to Karlstad. On 29 June 2019, he made his Allsvenskan debut as a substitute in a 0–0 draw with Göteborg. On 12 June 2020, Jno-Baptiste joined Superettan side AFC Eskilstuna on loan. In January 2022, Jno-Baptiste mutually agreed to terminate his contract with Östersund.

On 10 March 2022, Jno-Baptiste returned to England to sign for Southern League Premier Division South side Chesham United. On 1 November 2022, Jno-Baptiste was announced to have signed for Isthmian League Premier Division club Brightlingsea Regent having featured in their defeat at the weekend prior.

In January 2023, Jno-Baptiste played one game for Bowers & Pitsea, scoring after coming off the bench before joining American club Forward Madison of USL League One on 1 February 2023.

On 5 December 2024, Jno-Baptiste joined Maltese Premier League side Naxxar Lions.
