= Nazeem Bartman =

South African soccer player

Personal information
- Date of birth: 13 August 1993 (age 33)
- Place of birth: Cape Town, South Africa
- Height: 1.70 m (5 ft 7 in)
- Position: Forward

Youth career
- Ajax Cape Town
- Old Mutual
- SuperSport United

College career
Years	Team	Apps	(Gls)
2013–2014	Tyler Apache	39	(33)
2015–2016	South Florida Bulls	37	(14)

Senior career*
Years	Team	Apps	(Gls)
2013	Michigan Bucks	2	(0)
2017	Whitecaps FC 2	13	(1)
2018	Myrtle Beach Mutiny	8	(5)
2018	Ubuntu Cape Town	11	(0)
2019	Des Moines Menace	5	(1)
2019	Atlanta SC	4	(3)
2020	Stumptown Athletic	1	(0)
2020	Louisiana Krewe FC	0	(0)
2021	Des Moines Menace	7	(1)
2021	Chicago House	5	(3)
2022–2025	Forward Madison	79	(11)
Total		135	(25)
- * Club domestic league appearances and goals

Nazeem Bartman (born 13 August 1993) is a South African former soccer player who played as a forward.

== Career ==
Bartman played college soccer at Tyler Junior College, where he played for two years before transferring to the University of South Florida in 2015.

Bartman played with USL PDL side Michigan Bucks in 2013.

On 17 January 2017, Bartman was selected in the fourth round (73rd overall) of the 2017 MLS SuperDraft by Vancouver Whitecaps FC. He signed with Whitecaps FC 2 on 27 April 2017.

In July 2020, following stints with National Independent Soccer Association sides Atlanta SC and Stumptown Athletic, Bartman made an appearance with Louisiana Krewe FC during the NISA Independent Cup tournament. He scored a goal against Gaffa FC in the second leg of the Central Plains Region semifinals, and eventually converted a penalty kick shootout attempt, before the team fell 3–3 (8–9 pk).

In 2021, Bartman returned to play with Des Moines Menace.

On 16 March 2022, Bartman signed with USL League One club Forward Madison. On June 6, 2022, Bartman was named USL League One player of the week for Week 10 of the 2022 USL League One season after tallying a goal and an assist in Madison's 2-1 victory over FC Tucson.

On 1 December 2025, Bartman retired from professional football.
