= Christian Dean =

American soccer player

Personal information
- Date of birth: March 14, 1993 (age 33)
- Place of birth: East Palo Alto, California, U.S.
- Height: 1.90 m (6 ft 3 in)
- Position: Center-back

Team information
- Current team: Forward Madison

Youth career
- Palo Alto FC
- Santa Clara Sporting FC
- De Anza Force
- 2009–2010: National Academy Select 93 - West

College career
Years	Team	Apps	(Gls)
2011–2013	California Golden Bears	55	(1)

Senior career*
Years	Team	Apps	(Gls)
2014–2017	Vancouver Whitecaps FC	12	(0)
2014	→ Vancouver Whitecaps FC U-23 (loan)	3	(0)
2015	→ Whitecaps FC 2 (loan)	10	(1)
2017	→ Whitecaps FC 2 (loan)	2	(0)
2017–2018	Chicago Fire	5	(0)
2021	Charlotte Independence	17	(0)
2022	Bay Cities FC	4	(1)
2022–	Forward Madison	10	(0)

International career^{‡}
2014	United States U23	4	(1)
- * Club domestic league appearances and goals as of October 16, 2022 ‡ National team caps and goals as of April 23, 2015

Christian Dean (born March 14, 1993) is an American soccer player who currently plays as a center back for Forward Madison FC in USL League One.

== Career ==
=== Youth ===
Dean began his youth soccer career at the youth teams of Palo Alto Football Club, Santa Clara Sporting FC and U.S. Soccer Development Academy club De Anza Force. He was also selected into the National Academy Select 93 teams in 2009 and 2010 for the West and won the 2010 New York Red Bulls National High School Cup. He then went on to attend the University of California, Berkeley where he played college soccer for the California Golden Bears. During the 2013 season Dean was awarded All-Pac-12 and NSCAA Far West Region first-team honors as he led his team to the elite eight in the NCAA.

=== Vancouver Whitecaps FC ===
On January 16, 2014, Dean was selected as the third overall pick in the 2014 MLS SuperDraft by the Vancouver Whitecaps FC on a Generation Adidas contract. He made his professional debut in Major League Soccer on March 16, 2014, against Chivas USA when he came on as a 77th minute for Andy O'Brien as Vancouver drew 1–1.

=== Chicago Fire ===
On August 9, 2017, Dean was acquired by Chicago Fire in exchange for $50,000 of General Allocation Money as well as $50,000 of Targeted Allocation Money, and a percentage of any future transfer fees. He announced his retirement on November 1, 2018.

=== Charlotte Independence ===
On April 24, 2021, Dean returned to professional soccer after two years, signing a contract with USL Championship club Charlotte Independence ahead of the 2021 season.

=== Bay Cities FC ===
Ahead of the 2022 NISA season, Dean joined Bay Cities FC. He scored his first goal for the club on April 23, 2022, against California United Strikers FC.

=== Forward Madison FC ===
On June 8, 2022, Forward Madison FC manager Matt Glaeser announced at a community meeting that the club had signed Dean.

== International ==
Dean trained with the United States U20 side in 2012. Dean scored his first international goal for the U-23 team in a 30 friendly win over Mexico on April 22, 2015.

== Career statistics ==
As of March 17, 2014

Club	Season	League			MLS Cup		Canadian Cup		CONCACAF		Total	
Club	Season	Division	Apps	Goals	Apps	Goals	Apps	Goals	Apps	Goals	Apps	Goals
Vancouver Whitecaps FC	2014	MLS	4	0	—	—	0	0	—	—	4	0
Career total			4	0	0	0	0	0	0	0	4	0
