= Christian Enriquez =

American soccer player

Personal information
- Full name: Christian Enriquez
- Date of birth: October 25, 1998 (age 28)
- Place of birth: San Diego, California, United States
- Height: 5 ft 8 in (1.73 m)
- Position: Midfielder

Youth career
- –2016: Nomads SC

College career
Years	Team	Apps	(Gls)
2016–2017	Cal Poly Mustangs	33	(1)

Senior career*
Years	Team	Apps	(Gls)
2018	Portland Timbers 2	0	(0)
2019	ASC San Diego	17	(7)
2019–2020	San Diego 1904	8	(0)
2021–2022	Forward Madison	27	(2)
2023	Chattanooga Red Wolves	9	(0)

International career^{‡}
2016	United States U19	2	(0)
- * Club domestic league appearances and goals as of October 16, 2023 ‡ National team caps and goals as of June 20, 2021

Christian Enriquez (born October 25, 1998) is an American soccer player.

== Career ==
=== Youth ===
Enriquez played high school soccer at Helix High School, and club soccer for USSDA side Nomads SC, who he helped to US Youth Soccer national championships in both 2013 and 2014.

=== College ===
In 2016, Enriquez attended California Polytechnic State University to play college soccer. In two seasons with the Mustangs, Enriquez made 33 appearances, scoring a single goal and tallying 2 assists. In January 2018, Enriquez announced he would leave college early to pursue a professional career.

=== Professional ===
In February 2018, Enriquez signed for USL Championship side Portland Timbers 2. He left the club after a single season without making a first team appearance.

From February to July 2019, Enriquez played semi-professionally with NPSL side ASC San Diego. He won the NPSL Golden Ball with seven goals and six assists in 19 games.

Later in the year and in early 2020, Enriquez appeared for NISA side San Diego 1904, making 8 appearances.

On June 18, 2021, Enriquez joined USL League One side Forward Madison. He made his debut the following day, starting in a 2–0 loss to New England Revolution II.

Enriquez signed with Chattanooga Red Wolves on January 19, 2023.
