= Alann Torres =

American soccer player

Personal information
- Date of birth: September 24, 2003 (age 23)
- Place of birth: Goshen, Indiana, United States
- Height: 1.78 m (5 ft 10 in)
- Position: Midfielder

Youth career
- 2018–2021: Indiana Fire Juniors

Senior career*
Years	Team	Apps	(Gls)
2021–2023	Indy Eleven	4	(0)
2022	→ Forward Madison (loan)	19	(1)
- * Club domestic league appearances and goals as of May 20, 2024

Alann Torres (born September 24, 2003) is an American professional soccer player who last played as a midfielder for USL Championship club Indy Eleven.

== Career ==
=== Youth ===
From 8U-14U, Torres played club soccer for Magic SC (now Indiana Fire Academy North), based out of Middlebury, IN. He then played briefly for Elkhart County United before moving to Indiana Fire Juniors. He played two years of high school soccer at Bethany Christian High School.

In 2021, Torres was part of Indy Eleven's USL Academy League team that won the USL Academy League Playoffs in Tampa, Florida, earning First Team All-Tournament honors after scoring two goals and two assists.

=== Professional ===
Torres was signed to a USL Academy contract by USL Championship side Indy Eleven on August 9, 2021. Torres made his professional debut on September 22, 2021, coming on as a substitution in the 82nd minute of a 1–0 loss to Memphis 901 FC.

Torres was signed to his first professional contract by Indy Eleven in the following offseason on January 21, 2022. Before the start of the 2022 season, Torres was sent on a season-long loan to Forward Madison FC of USL League One.

Torres played his first game for Indy Eleven in 2023 on April 5, starting in a 3–1 Open Cup victory over Michigan Stars FC. Torres made one substitute appearance for Indy Eleven in the 2023 USL Championship season, playing 2 minutes on April 8 in a 3–0 loss to Oakland Roots SC.
