= Andrew Wheeler-Omiunu =

American professional soccer player (born 1994)

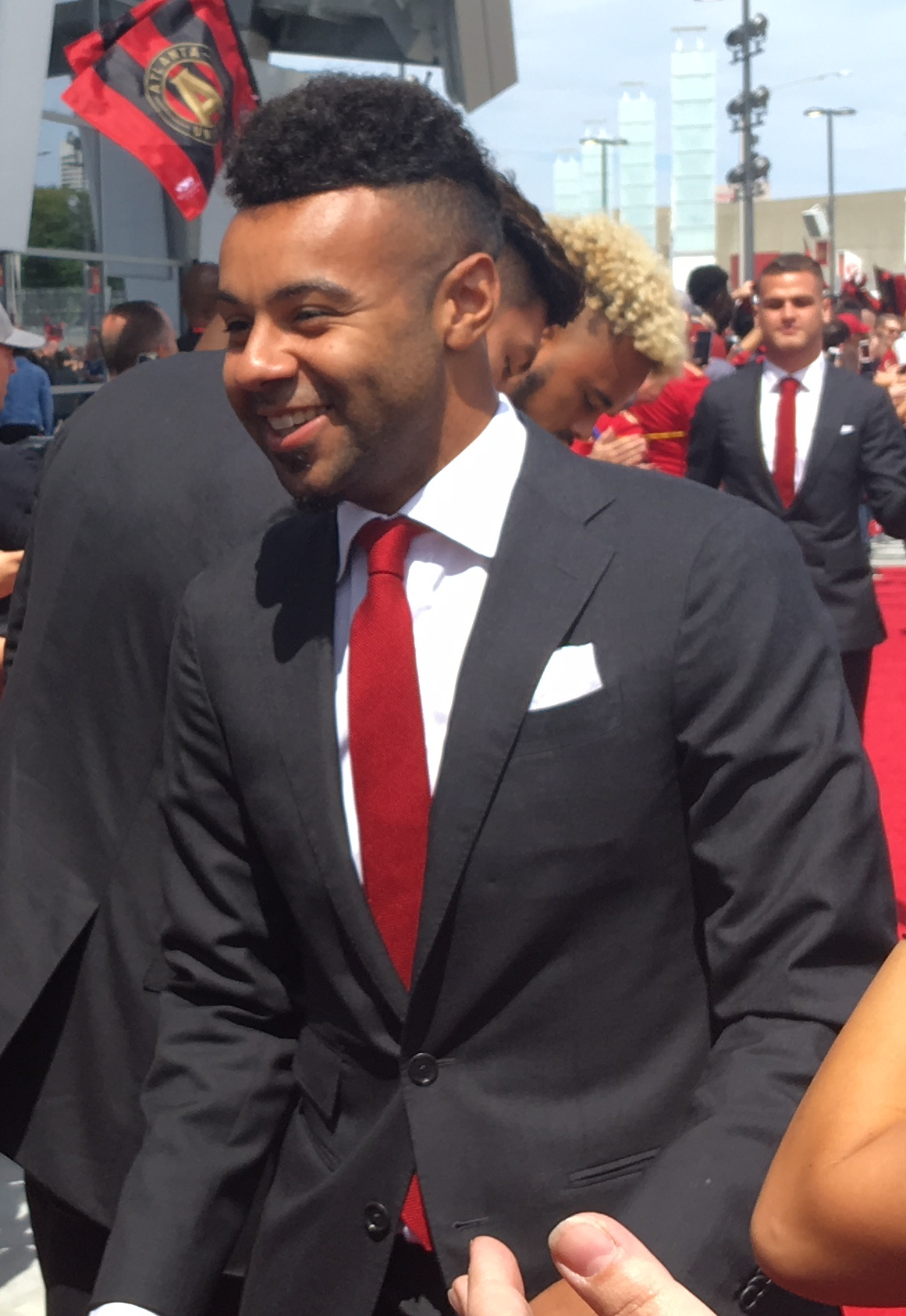
- Wheeler-Omiunu with Atlanta United in 2017

Personal information
- Date of birth: December 1, 1994 (age 31)
- Place of birth: Bellingham, Massachusetts, U.S.
- Height: 1.75 m (5 ft 9 in)
- Position: Midfielder

College career
Years	Team	Apps	(Gls)
2013–2016	Harvard Crimson	64	(4)

Senior career*
Years	Team	Apps	(Gls)
2015	GPS Portland Phoenix	6	(0)
2016	Seattle Sounders FC U-23	12	(1)
2017–2018	Atlanta United	1	(0)
2018	→ Atlanta United 2 (loan)	10	(0)
2019	FC Tucson	20	(2)
2019	→ Phoenix Rising (loan)	6	(1)
2020–2021	Sacramento Republic	27	(0)
2022–2023	Forward Madison	54	(1)
- * Club domestic league appearances and goals as of February 12, 2024

Andrew Wheeler-Omiunu (born December 1, 1994) is an American former professional soccer player.

== College career ==
Wheeler-Omiunu attended Harvard University, where he played college soccer for four years, tallying four goals and six assists in 64 appearances for the Crimson.

While at college, Wheeler-Omiunu appeared for Premier Development League sides GPS Portland Phoenix and Seattle Sounders FC U-23.

== Club career ==
On January 17, 2017, Wheeler-Omiunu was selected in the third round (46th overall) of the 2017 MLS SuperDraft by Atlanta United. He signed with the club on February 10, 2017.

On June 14, 2017, Wheeler-Omiunu made his professional debut as a 60th-minute substitute during a 3–2 win over Charleston Battery in the Lamar Hunt U.S. Open Cup.

Wheeler-Omiunu made his professional debut for Atlanta United on March 31, 2018, coming on as a 74th minute substitution in a 1–0 win over Minnesota United.

Wheeler-Omiunu was released by Atlanta at the end of their 2018 season.

On January 30, 2019, Wheeler-Omiunu joined USL League One side FC Tucson.

After a season's stint with FC Tucson, Wheeler–Omiunu signed with Sacramento Republic for the 2020 season. On November 17, 2020, Sacramento exercised the option on Wheeler-Omiunu's contract, retaining him for the 2021 season. Wheeler-Omiunu was released by Sacramento following the 2021 season.

On January 12, 2022, Forward Madison FC announced that it had signed Wheeler-Omiunu to a contract for the 2022 season.

Following the 2023 season, it was revealed by Forward Madison staff that Wheeler-Omiunu had retired.

== Personal life ==
Wheeler-Omiunu is of Nigerian descent through his father, David. He attended the Roxbury Latin School in West Roxbury, Massachusetts. An accredited vocalist performer, Wheeler-Omiunu has a penchant for R&B and a cappella.

== Honors ==
Atlanta United

- MLS Cup: 2018
