= Justin Sukow =

American soccer player

Personal information
- Full name: Justin Sukow
- Date of birth: September 19, 1998 (age 28)
- Place of birth: Evanston, Illinois, United States
- Height: 5 ft 10 in (1.78 m)
- Position: Attacking midfielder

Youth career
- –2017: Lonestar SC

College career
Years	Team	Apps	(Gls)
2017–2018	South Carolina Gamecocks	34	(8)
2019–2020	Loyola Ramblers	20	(9)

Senior career*
Years	Team	Apps	(Gls)
2018	SC United Bantams	13	(1)
2019	Chicago FC United	10	(1)
2020	Reno 1868	0	(0)
2021–2022	Forward Madison	46	(2)
2023–2024	Richmond Kickers	39	(2)
Total		108	(6)
- * Club domestic league appearances and goals

Justin Sukow (born September 19, 1998) is an American former soccer player played as a midfielder.

== Career ==
=== Youth ===
Sukow played with local USSDA side Lonestar SC, where he was a team captain.

=== College and amateur ===
Sukow attended the University of South Carolina in 2017 to play college soccer, where he went on to make 34 appearances, scoring 8 goals and tallying 3 assists over two seasons with the Gamecocks. During his time at South Carolina, Sukow was also named to the 2018 SEC Fall Academic Honor Roll, the 2017 C-USA Commissioner's Honor Roll, and the 2017 SEC First-Year Academic Honor Roll. Sukow transferred to Loyola University Chicago in 2019, where he scored 9 goals and got 5 assists in 20 appearances. The season saw Sukow earn United Soccer Coaches Third Team All-West Region honors, as well as First Team All-Missouri Valley Conference. Loyola's 2020 season was cancelled due to the COVID-19 pandemic.

In 2018 and 2019, Sukow also played in the USL League Two with SC United Bantams and Chicago FC United respectively.

=== Professional ===
On September 15, 2020, Sukow signed with USL Championship side Reno 1868. Reno 1868 ceased operations as a club following their 2020 season.

On April 22, 2021, Sukow joined USL League One side Forward Madison. He made his professional debut on May 8, 2021, appearing as a 72nd-minute substitute during a 1–1 draw with FC Tucson.

On January 31, 2023, Sukow signed with USL League One side Richmond Kickers.

On 1 December 2024, Sukow retired from the Kickers when his contract expired.
