= Abdou Mbacke Thiam =

Senegalese footballer

Personal information
- Date of birth: 3 February 1992 (age 34)
- Place of birth: Dakar, Senegal
- Height: 1.83 m (6 ft 0 in)
- Position: Forward

Team information
- Current team: Maryland Bobcats
- Number: 18

College career
| Years | Team | Apps | (Gls) |
| 2015–2018 | Connecticut Huskies | 77 | (46) |

Senior career*
| Years | Team | Apps | (Gls) |
| 2019–2021 | Louisville City | 33 | (3) |
| 2022 | Forward Madison | 26 | (2) |
| 2023– | Maryland Bobcats | 0 | (0) |
- * Club domestic league appearances and goals as of April 3, 2023

Abdou Mbacke Thiam (born 3 February 1992) is a Senegalese footballer who plays as a forward for Maryland Bobcats in the National Independent Soccer Association.
