= Audi Jepson =

American soccer player

Personal information
- Full name: Austin Jepson
- Date of birth: August 23, 1994 (age 32)
- Place of birth: Green Bay, Wisconsin, United States
- Height: 1.75 m (5 ft 9 in)
- Position: Midfielder

College career
| Years | Team | Apps | (Gls) |
| 2013–2017 | Green Bay Phoenix | 66 | (25) |

Senior career*
| Years | Team | Apps | (Gls) |
| 2015 | St. Louis Lions | | |
| 2017 | Seacoast United Phantoms | 14 | (3) |
| 2018 | Des Moines Menace | 14 | (6) |
| 2018–2019 | Saint Louis FC | 7 | (1) |
| 2021–2022 | Forward Madison | 27 | (1) |
| 2023 | Des Moines Menace | | |
| 2024 | Tallahassee SC | | |
- * Club domestic league appearances and goals as of April 26, 2024

Austin "Audi" Jepson (born August 23, 1994) is an American professional soccer player.

== Career ==
=== College & Youth career ===
Jepson played college soccer at the University of Wisconsin–Green Bay from 2013 to 2017, including spending 2016 as a redshirt.

Jepson also played three seasons in the Premier Development League, with St. Louis Lions in 2015, for Seacoast United Phantoms in 2017, and Des Moines Menace in 2018.

=== Professional ===
Jepson signed his first professional contract with United Soccer League side Saint Louis FC on August 9, 2018.

On April 28, 2021, Jepson signed with USL League One side Forward Madison.
