= Jeremiah Streng =

Finnish footballer (born 2001)

Personal information
- Full name: David Jeremiah Kristoffersson Streng
- Date of birth: 8 November 2001 (age 25)
- Place of birth: Vaasa, Finland
- Height: 1.88 m (6 ft 2 in)
- Position: Striker

Team information
- Current team: SJK
- Number: 9

Youth career
- –2017: VIFK

Senior career*
| Years | Team | Apps | (Gls) |
| 2017–2018 | VIFK | 30 | (7) |
| 2019–2020 | SJK II | 33 | (21) |
| 2019– | SJK | 112 | (22) |
| 2021 | → HIFK (loan) | 8 | (0) |
| 2021 | → Jaro (loan) | 14 | (4) |
| 2022 | → Forward Madison (loan) | 30 | (7) |
| 2024 | → Ascoli (loan) | 11 | (0) |

International career^{‡}
| 2018 | Finland U17 | 2 | (0) |
| 2019 | Finland U18 | 5 | (0) |
| 2019 | Finland U19 | 4 | (1) |
| 2021 | Finland U20 | 1 | (1) |
- * Club domestic league appearances and goals as of 13 November 2026 ‡ National team caps and goals as of 16 January 2024

Jeremiah Streng (born 8 November 2001) is a Finnish professional footballer who plays as a striker for Veikkausliiga club SJK. Born in Vaasa, Streng is a Swedish-speaking Finn.

== Club career ==
Streng played in the youth sector of local club VIFK, before debuting with the first team in 2017.

=== SJK and loans ===
In the early 2019, he moved to Seinäjoki and joined SJK in Veikkausliiga. He was registered to the first team, but he additionally featured for the club's reserve team SJK Akatemia.

On 4 February 2021, Streng extended his contract with SJK, and was immediately thereafter loaned out to Veikkausliiga club HIFK. On 25 July 2021, he joined Ykkönen side FF Jaro on loan for the rest of the season.

On 17 March 2022, Streng joined Forward Madison in USL League One on a season-long loan.

In the 2023 Veikkausliiga season, Streng made a breakthrough in Finnish top-tier with SJK, scoring seven goals in 27 appearances in the league.

On 16 January 2024, Streng was loaned out to Italian Serie B club Ascoli until the end of 2023–24 season, with a deal including an option-to-buy. Additionally, Streng extended his contract with SJK until the end of 2025. Streng returned to SJK after his loan deal expired in the summer.

== International career ==
Streng has represented Finland at under-17, under-18, under-19 and under-20 youth international levels.

== Career statistics ==
As of 13 November 2026

Appearances and goals by club, season and competition
| Club | Season | League | | | Cup (Note: Includes Suomen Cup) | | League cup (Note: Includes Finnish League Cup) | | Europe | | Total | |
| Club | Season | Division | Apps | Goals | Apps | Goals | Apps | Goals | Apps | Goals | Apps | Goals |
|---|---|---|---|---|---|---|---|---|---|---|---|---|
| Vasa IFK | 2017 | Kakkonen | 12 | 3 | 0 | 0 | — | | — | | 12 | 3 |
| Vasa IFK | 2018 | Kakkonen | 18 | 4 | 2 | 1 | — | | — | | 20 | 5 |
| Vasa IFK | Total | | 30 | 7 | 2 | 1 | — | | — | | 32 | 8 |
| SJK Akatemia | 2019 | Kakkonen | 12 | 9 | — | | — | | — | | 12 | 9 |
| SJK Akatemia | 2020 | Ykkönen | 21 | 12 | — | | — | | — | | 21 | 12 |
| SJK Akatemia | Total | | 33 | 21 | — | | — | | — | | 33 | 21 |
| SJK | 2019 | Veikkausliiga | 17 | 0 | 5 | 3 | — | | — | | 22 | 3 |
| SJK | 2020 | Veikkausliiga | 1 | 0 | 5 | 0 | — | | — | | 6 | 0 |
| SJK | 2021 | Veikkausliiga | 0 | 0 | 0 | 0 | — | | — | | 0 | 0 |
| SJK | 2022 | Veikkausliiga | 0 | 0 | 0 | 0 | 0 | 0 | 0 | 0 | 0 | 0 |
| SJK | 2023 | Veikkausliiga | 27 | 7 | 2 | 2 | 5 | 0 | — | | 34 | 9 |
| SJK | 2024 | Veikkausliiga | 13 | 2 | 1 | 0 | 0 | 0 | – | | 14 | 2 |
| SJK | 2025 | Veikkausliiga | 30 | 7 | 3 | 3 | 5 | 3 | 2 | 0 | 38 | 15 |
| SJK | 2026 | Veikkausliiga | 24 | 4 | 3 | 2 | 5 | 3 | 0 | 0 | 32 | 9 |
| Total | | 112 | 22 | 18 | 10 | 15 | 6 | 2 | 0 | 157 | 38 | |
| HIFK (loan) | 2021 | Veikkausliiga | 8 | 0 | 5 | 1 | — | | — | | 13 | 1 |
| Jaro (loan) | 2021 | Ykkönen | 14 | 4 | — | | — | | — | | 14 | 4 |
| Forward Madison (loan) | 2022 | USL League One | 30 | 7 | 1 | 0 | — | | — | | 31 | 7 |
| Ascoli (loan) | 2023–24 | Serie B | 11 | 0 | 0 | 0 | — | | — | | 11 | 0 |
| Career total | | | 228 | 62 | 27 | 12 | 16 | 11 | 2 | 0 | 273 | 85 |
