= Rojay Smith =

Jamaican footballer (born 1996)

Personal information
- Date of birth: September 21, 1996 (age 30)
- Place of birth: Portmore, Jamaica
- Height: 5 ft 11 in (1.80 m)
- Position: Forward

Team information
- Current team: Forward Madison
- Number: 11

Youth career
- –2015: Harbour View

College career
Years	Team	Apps	(Gls)
2016–2017	Tonkawa Mavericks	37	(33)
2018–2019	Tampa Spartans	27	(8)

Senior career*
Years	Team	Apps	(Gls)
2015–2017	Harbour View		(2)
2021	Sporting Kansas City II	29	(5)
2022–	Forward Madison	25	(4)
- * Club domestic league appearances and goals as of 16 October 2022

Rojay Smith (born 21 September 1996) is a Jamaican footballer who plays as a forward for USL League One club Forward Madison FC.

== Career ==
Smith began playing with Jamaican National Premier League side Harbour View, before heading to the United States to play college soccer at Northern Oklahoma College in 2016 and 2017, where he scored 33 goals in 37 appearances. Smith also returned to Harbour View in 2017 during the college off season.

In 2018, Smith transferred to the University of Tampa, where he played two seasons, scoring 8 goals and tallying 7 assists in 27 appearances.

On 26 April 2021, Smith signed with USL Championship side Sporting Kansas City II. He made his debut on 1 May 2021, appearing as a 76th-minute substitute during a 2–0 loss to FC Tulsa.

Following the 2021 season, Kansas City opted to declined their contract option on Smith.

Smith signed with Forward Madison of USL League One on January 17, 2022.
