= Raiko Arozarena =

Cuban footballer (born 1997)

Personal information
- Full name: Raiko Arozarena González
- Date of birth: 27 March 1997 (age 29)
- Place of birth: Pinar del Río, Cuba
- Height: 1.81 m (5 ft 11 in)
- Position: Goalkeeper

Team information
- Current team: New Mexico United

Senior career*
Years	Team	Apps	(Gls)
- Pinar del Río
2018–2020	Venados	0	(0)
2020	Cafetaleros de Chiapas	20	(0)
2021–2023	Tampa Bay Rowdies	5	(0)
2022	→ Forward Madison (loan)	16	(0)
2024–2025	Las Vegas Lights	48	(0)
2026–	New Mexico United	2	(0)

International career^{‡}
- Cuba U20
2022–	Cuba	17	(0)
- * Club domestic league appearances and goals as of 31 October 2026 ‡ National team caps and goals as of 6 July 2025

Raiko Arozarena González (born 27 March 1997) is a Cuban professional footballer who plays as a goalkeeper who plays for USL Championship club New Mexico United.

== Club career ==
After trying baseball he decided to follow in his father's footsteps and become a goalkeeper, beginning his career with local club Pinar del Río.

On 9 April 2021, Arozarena joined USL Championship side Tampa Bay Rowdies. Arozarena made his debut for the Rowdies on 20 October 2021, in a 3–0 home win over Miami FC.

On 12 July 2022, Arozarena was loaned to Forward Madison FC in USL League One. Madison sent goalkeeper Phil Breno to Tampa Bay as part of the deal. Arozarena returned to Tampa Bay on 20 October 2022, following the end of the 2022 USL League One season. Arozarena was released by the Rowdies following the 2023 season.

On 8 March 2024, Arozarena was signed by Las Vegas Lights.

On 19 January 2026, New Mexico United announced they had signed Arozarena to a contract for the 2026 USL Championship season.

== International career ==
In November 2022, Arozarena made his debut for the Cuba national team, playing two friendlies in a series against the Dominican Republic. He started the first, a 4–2 victory, and was subbed into the second, a 1–1 draw.

== Personal life ==
Arozarena's older brother is professional baseball outfielder Randy Arozarena, who plays for the Seattle Mariners.

== Career statistics ==
=== Club ===
As of 16 April 2019.

Club	Season	League			Cup		Other		Total	
Club	Season	Division	Apps	Goals	Apps	Goals	Apps	Goals	Apps	Goals
Venados	2018–19	Ascenso MX	0	0	1 (Note: Appearances in the Copa MX)	0	0	0	1	0
Career total			0	0	1	0	0	0	1	0
