= Matheus Cassini =

Brazilian footballer

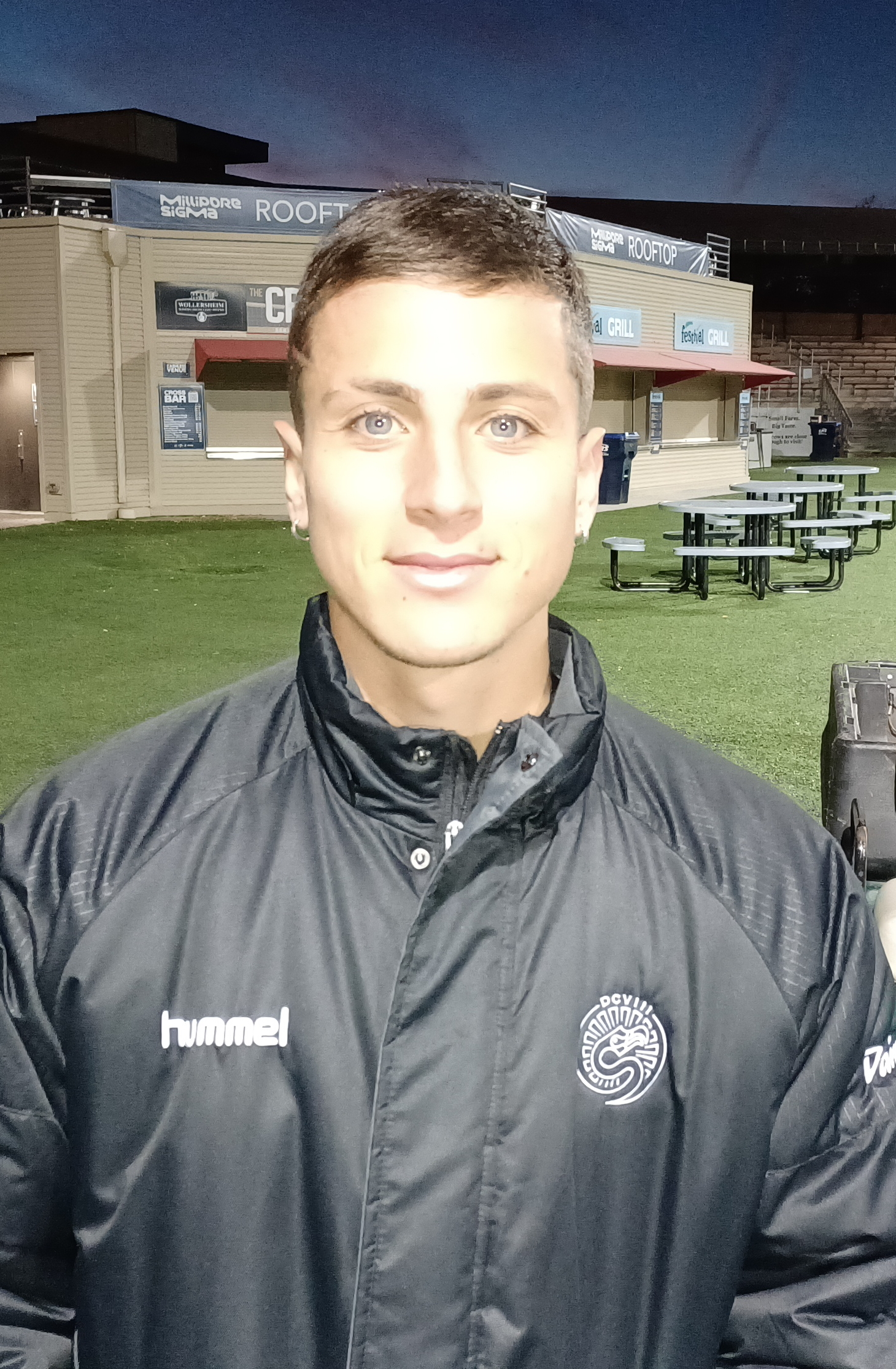
- Cassini with Forward Madison after the 2022 season.

Personal information
- Full name: Matheus Henrique Cassini de Paula
- Date of birth: 15 February 1996 (age 30)
- Place of birth: São Paulo, Brazil
- Height: 1.72 m (5 ft 7 1/2 in)
- Position: Attacking midfielder

Youth career
- 2008–2015: Corinthians

Senior career*
Years	Team	Apps	(Gls)
2015–2017	Palermo	0	(0)
2016	→ Inter Zaprešić (loan)	6	(0)
2016–2017	→ Siracusa (loan)	15	(0)
2017	Ponte Preta	3	(0)
2017	Santos	0	(0)
2017–2018	Oeste	0	(0)
2018–2020	Amiens B	4	(0)
2018–2019	→ Estoril (loan)	0	(0)
2020	Fluminense	0	(0)
2021	Sampaio Corrêa	11	(1)
2021	Botev Vratsa	11	(1)
2022	Forward Madison	26	(5)
2023	South Georgia Tormenta	14	(5)
- * Club domestic league appearances and goals as of 16 October 2022

Matheus Henrique Cassini de Paula (born 15 February 1996), known as Matheus Cassini, is a Brazilian footballer. Mainly an attacking midfielder, he can also play as a left winger.

== Club career ==
Born in São Paulo, Cassini started his career with hometown club Corinthians, where he was seen as a promising youngster. He was snapped up by Italian side Palermo on 26 May 2015, for a reported fee of R$3.5 million, after rejecting contract renewal talks with Timão. Upon arriving, he was given the number 9 shirt, and was expected to feature heavily for the first team.

After only appearing for the Primavera team, Cassini was loaned to Croatian side NK Inter Zaprešić on 26 January 2016. He made his senior debut on 2 March, coming on as a second-half substitute for Jakov Puljić in a 2–1 away win against NK Lokomotiva.

After contributing with six appearances, all from the bench, Cassini was loaned to Lega Pro side Siracusa Calcio on 23 August 2016. The following 31 January, after being reportedly unhappy at the club, he rescinded his contract with the Rosanero.

After being linked to a possible return to his former club Corinthians, Cassini signed a five-month deal with fellow Campeonato Brasileiro Série A club Ponte Preta, with an option for a further year. On 9 June 2017, after appearing rarely for Ponte, he signed for Santos until the end of the year, with a three-year option, being initially assigned to the B-team.

On 19 September 2017, after appearing rarely even with the B-side, Cassini cut ties with Santos and joined Oeste.

On 18 January 2018, Cassini signed a 2.5-year contract with French Ligue 1 club Amiens SC. However, the club was not able to register him, because they had too many foreign players in their squad. The club terminated the loan deal of Nathan in February, and the club then registered him for their squad. In August 2021, Cassini moved to Bulgarian club Botev Vratsa on a contract envisioned to be for two seasons.

Cassini joined USL League One club Forward Madison on 20 January 2022. In January 2023, Cassini signed with USL League One's South Georgia Tormenta for the 2023 season. Cassini and Tormenta mutually agreed to part ways on 22 August 2023.

== Career statistics ==
As of 17 April 2018.

Club	Season	League			State League		Cup		Continental		Other		Total	
Club	Season	Division	Apps	Goals	Apps	Goals	Apps	Goals	Apps	Goals	Apps	Goals	Apps	Goals
Corinthians	2015	Série A	0	0	0	0	0	0	—		0	0	0	0
Palermo	2015–16	Serie A	0	0	–		0	0	—		—		0	0
Inter Zaprešić (loan)	2015–16	Prva HNL	6	0	–		0	0	—		0	0	6	0
Siracusa (loan)	2016–17	Lega Pro	15	0	–		0	0	—		0	0	15	0
Ponte Preta	2017	Série A	0	0	3 (Note: Appearance(s) in Campeonato Paulista)	0	0	0	0	0	0	0	3	0
Santos	2017	Série A	0	0	—		0	0	—		4 (Note: Appearance(s) in Copa Paulista)	0	4	0
Oeste	2017	Série B	0	0	—		—		—		—		0	0
Amiens B	2017–18	Championnat National 3	4	0	—		0	0	—		0	0	4	0
Estoril (loan)	2018–19	Primeira Liga	0	0	—		0	0	—		0	0	0	0
Fluminense	2020	Série A	0	0	0	0	0	0	—		—		0	0
Career total			25	0	3	0	0	0	0	0	4	0	32	0
