= Phil Breno =

American soccer player

Personal information
- Full name: Philip Breno
- Date of birth: December 11, 1995 (age 30)
- Place of birth: Mount Airy, Maryland, United States
- Height: 6 ft 3 in (1.91 m)
- Position: Goalkeeper

College career
Years	Team	Apps	(Gls)
2013–2015	UMBC Retrievers	11	(0)
2016–2017	William & Mary Tribe	41	(0)

Senior career*
Years	Team	Apps	(Gls)
2015–2018	FC Frederick	34	(0)
2019–2020	Charleston Battery	10	(0)
2021–2022	Forward Madison	39	(0)
2022	→ Tampa Bay Rowdies (loan)	6	(0)
2023–2024	Tampa Bay Rowdies	6	(0)
- * Club domestic league appearances and goals as of November 7, 2024

Philip Breno (born December 11, 1995) is an American soccer player.

== Career ==
Breno began playing college soccer at the University of Maryland, Baltimore County in 2013, before transferring to the College of William & Mary in 2016 where he played for two further years.

During and immediately after college, Breno also appeared for National Premier Soccer League side FC Frederick between 2015 and 2018.

=== Charleston Battery ===
On March 8, 2019, Breno joined USL Championship side Charleston Battery. He made his professional debut on August 14, 2019, start in a 2–1 win over Loudoun United.

=== Forward Madison ===
On March 3, 2021, Breno signed with USL League One side Forward Madison FC.

==== Tampa Bay Rowdies (loan) ====
On July 12, 2022, Breno was loaned to the Tampa Bay Rowdies of the USL Championship for the remainder of the 2022 season. Rowdies goalkeeper Raiko Arozarena was loaned to Madison in the deal.

=== Tampa Bay Rowdies ===
Breno signed a permanent contract with the Rowdies on January 25, 2023. He left Tampa Bay following their 2024 season.
