= Derek Gebhard =

American soccer player (born 1995)

Personal information
- Date of birth: October 15, 1995 (age 31)
- Place of birth: Blue Hill, Maine, United States
- Height: 1.84 m (6 ft 0 in)
- Position: Forward

Team information
- Current team: Forward Madison
- Number: 17

College career
Years	Team	Apps	(Gls)
2014	Florida Gulf Coast Eagles	16	(0)

Senior career*
Years	Team	Apps	(Gls)
2015	Jacksonville United		
2015–2018	Jacksonville Armada	60	(6)
2018–2019	El Paso Locomotive	18	(2)
2018	→ Charlotte Independence (loan)	6	(1)
2019	OKC Energy	6	(0)
2020	Charlotte Independence	12	(2)
2021–	Forward Madison	145	(29)
- * Club domestic league appearances and goals as of October 31, 2026

Derek Gebhard (born October 15, 1995) is an American professional soccer player who plays as a forward for Forward Madison FC in USL League One. He is the club's all-time leading goalscorer.

== Early life and education ==
Gebhard was born in Blue Hill, Maine and lived in Spain as a child before moving to Severna Park, Maryland, later relocating to Florida as a teenager. He attended George Steinbrenner High School in Lutz, Florida, and was selected for the U.S. Soccer Region III Olympic Development Program.

== College career ==
Gebhard played college soccer for Florida Gulf Coast University in 2014, making 16 appearances and recording one assist.

== Club career ==
=== Jacksonville United and Jacksonville Armada ===
Gebhard played for Jacksonville United FC in the National Premier Soccer League in 2015 before signing with Jacksonville Armada FC on July 30, 2015. He later signed a contract extension with the Armada in October 2016.

=== El Paso Locomotive and loan to Charlotte Independence ===
In August 2018, Gebhard was announced as one of El Paso Locomotive FC's early signings, with the club noting he would be loaned to Charlotte Independence for the remainder of the 2018 season. In 2019, he scored in El Paso's home opener against OKC Energy FC, which was described as the first goal in the club's history.

=== OKC Energy ===
In August 2019, Gebhard was traded to OKC Energy FC in exchange for Alexy Bosetti.

=== Charlotte Independence ===
Gebhard returned to Charlotte Independence on a permanent deal for the 2020 season.

=== Forward Madison ===
On February 11, 2021, Forward Madison FC announced it had signed Gebhard, describing him as a winger who could play across the forward line. In 2025, he was credited with setting a club regular-season record with 11 goals and earning an All-League Second Team selection before re-signing for 2026.

== Honors ==
Individual

- USL League One All-League Second Team: 2025
