= Old Mutual FC =

- Full name: Old Mutual Football Club
- Ground: Old Mutual Sports Facility
- Chairman: (South Africa) Paul Blows
- Manager: (South Africa) Marvyn Adams

Old Mutual FC is a South Africa soccer club from Cape Town, South Africa.

== Notable former players ==
- (South Africa) Mark Mayambela
- (South Africa) Roscoe Pietersen
