= Matt Glaeser =

American soccer player and coach

Personal information
- Full name: Matthew Glaeser
- Date of birth: April 27, 1985 (age 41)
- Place of birth: Fredericksburg, Virginia, U.S.
- Height: 6 ft 5 in (1.96 m)
- Position: Goalkeeper

Team information
- Current team: Forward Madison (head coach)

College career
Years	Team	Apps	(Gls)
2003–2005	James Madison Dukes		
2006–2007	Hartford Hawks	33	(0)

Senior career*
Years	Team	Apps	(Gls)
2008	Western Mass Pioneers	20	(0)
2009	Pallo-Iirot	7	(0)
2010–2013	Fort Lauderdale Strikers	67	(0)
2010	→ FC Tampa Bay (loan)	0	(0)
2014–2015	Wilmington Hammerheads	2	(0)

Managerial career
- 2017–2021: Real Monarchs (assistant coach)
- 2020–2021: Real Salt Lake (set-piece specialist/assistant coach)
- 2021: Sacramento Republic (assistant coach/director of goalkeeping)
- 2022–: Forward Madison
- * Club domestic league appearances and goals

Matthew "Matt" Glaeser (born April 27, 1985) is an American soccer coach and former player who played as a goalkeeper. He is the head coach and technical director of USL League One club Forward Madison FC.

== Playing career ==
=== College ===
Glaeser played college soccer at James Madison University and the University of Hartford. At Hartford, he was the 2007 America East Conference Goalkeeper of the Year and the NSCAA Northeast Region Goalkeeper of the Year, and he helped lead the Hawks to an America East Championship appearance while allowing 18 goals, fewer than one per match.

=== Professional ===
Glaeser was expected to be a high pick at the 2008 MLS SuperDraft, but was not drafted by any team, and was forced to look elsewhere for games; he subsequently signed for the Western Mass Pioneers in the USL Second Division, and played 20 games between the posts in his debut professional season.

After a successful trial Glaeser signed for Finnish club Pallo-Iirot in 2009, and spent the year playing for them in the Kakkonen, the Finnish third division.

Glaeser returned to the United States in 2010 and signed for Miami FC of the USSF Division 2 Professional League. He spent most of the early part of the year as a backup keeper to Caleb Patterson-Sewell, and spent a brief period on loan at state rivals FC Tampa Bay as injury cover, before making his debut for the team on September 11, 2010, in a 2–1 win over Montreal Impact.

During the 2011 season Glaeser started 27 games for Fort Lauderdale. As a result of his good performances, Glaeser signed a new contract with the club in July 2011, tying him down through the 2012 season with an option for an additional year. In 2012, he recorded 108 saves in regular-season play and ranked second in saves in the league, according to James Madison University athletics.

On March 28, 2014, Glaeser signed with USL Pro club Wilmington Hammerheads. In addition to his signing as an active player on the club roster, Glaeser would also serve as the club's goalkeeper coach and community development coordinator.

Glaeser retired from playing at the end of the 2015 season.

== Coaching career ==
After retiring as a player, Glaeser transitioned into full-time coaching with the Wilmington Hammerheads in 2015–16.

In 2017, Glaeser joined the coaching staff of Real Monarchs and later also worked with Real Salt Lake. In January 2020, Real Salt Lake announced he would serve in a dual role as a Real Monarchs assistant coach and Real Salt Lake set-piece specialist. In January 2021, Real Salt Lake announced that the club and Glaeser had mutually agreed to part ways so he could join Mark Briggs' staff at Sacramento Republic FC.

On 3 December 2021, Glaeser was announced as head coach and technical director of Forward Madison FC ahead of the 2022 USL League One season. In July 2023, he was named USL League One Coach of the Month for June. In November 2023, Forward Madison announced a contract extension that would keep him in charge for the 2024 season. In July 2024, he was named League One Coach of the Month for June for a second time. In November 2024, the club announced a multi-year contract extension for Glaeser.

== Honours ==
=== As a coach ===
- USL Championship: 2019 (assistant coach, Real Monarchs)
- USL Regular Season Shield: 2017 (assistant coach, Real Monarchs)

=== Individual ===
- USL League One Coach of the Month: June 2023
- USL League One Coach of the Month: June 2024
