= 2022 North Carolina FC season =

North Carolina FC
2022 season
- Owner: Stephen Malik
- Head coach: John Bradford
- Stadium: WakeMed Soccer Park
- USL League One: 11th
- USL League One Playoffs: Did not qualify
- U.S. Open Cup: Second round
- Top goalscorer: League: Garrett McLaughlin (14); All: Garrett McLaughlin (14)
- Highest home attendance: League: 5,092 (8/13 vs. CVF)
- Lowest home attendance: All: 575 (4/6 vs. RGV, USOC); League: 1,034 (8/10 vs. MAD)
- Average home league attendance: 1,874
- Biggest win: NC 2–0 CLT (6/18)
- Biggest defeat: CLT 5–1 NC (10/15)

The 2022 North Carolina FC season was the 16th season in the club's history and its second season in USL League One, the third tier of the United States soccer league system. North Carolina FC was coached by John Bradford and played its home matches at WakeMed Soccer Park in Cary, North Carolina. The club entered the season after finishing 12th and last in the 2021 USL League One season.

North Carolina FC finished the 2022 USL League One regular season in 11th place with a record of 8 wins, 16 losses and 6 draws. The club scored 35 goals and conceded 53, finishing with 30 points. It therefore failed to qualify for the six-team USL League One playoffs. In the 2022 U.S. Open Cup, North Carolina FC was eliminated in the second round by Rio Grande Valley FC Toros, losing 2–1 at home on April 6.

The season began with two preseason victories, including a 1–0 win over the University of North Carolina at Greensboro and a 3–0 win over the University of North Carolina Wilmington. Goalkeeper Will Pulisic joined the club on a season-long loan from Austin FC in March.

During the season, Bradford signed a multi-year contract extension with North Carolina FC. The club also continued its youth-to-professional pathway, signing eight NCFC Academy players to amateur contracts in April. In September, academy product Marvin Mariche signed a two-year professional contract with the club.

Forward Garrett McLaughlin was the club's leading scorer with 14 league goals, finishing second in the USL League One Golden Boot race. He was subsequently named to the USL League One All-League First Team. Forward Oalex Anderson scored seven league goals and recorded four assists, while midfielder Jaden Servania scored three goals and recorded two assists.

The club's strongest individual late-season performance came from 16-year-old Nicolás Rincón, who assisted McLaughlin's 14th goal and scored the winning goal in a 2–1 victory over Central Valley Fuego FC on September 28. Rincón was subsequently named USL League One Player of the Week.

== Club ==
=== Roster ===
The club's 2022 roster combined established USL League One players with players developed through the NCFC Academy. The club also used several academy players on amateur contracts while they maintained their college eligibility.

No.	Pos.	Nation	Player
1	GK	USA	Nick Holliday
2	DF	USA	Christian Lue Young
3	DF	SLV	Nelson Blanco
4	DF	USA	Max Flick
5	DF	ENG	Jordan Skelton
6	DF	USA	Gustavo Fernandes
7	MF	BRA	Pecka
8	MF	USA	Luis Arriaga
9	FW	VIN	Oalex Anderson
10	MF	PUR	Jaden Servania
11	FW	USA	Cole Frame
14	DF	USA	Nelson Martinez
16	FW	ARG	Nicolás Molina
17	FW	ENG	Showkat Tahir
19	FW	USA	Garrett McLaughlin
21	DF	USA	Haroun Conteh
22	MF	USA	Drew Kerr
24	GK	USA	Samuel Terranova
25	DF	USA	Britton Fischer
26	MF	USA	John McDowell
27	MF	USA	Jake Shannon
28	FW	USA	Rohit Thakur
29	MF	USA	Caden Tolentino
31	MF	COL	Nicolás Rincón
34	GK	USA	Will Pulisic (on loan from Austin FC)
44	MF	SKN	Raheem Somersall

North Carolina FC Youth Academy contract

Eight NCFC Academy players were signed to amateur contracts on April 6: Haroun Conteh, Drew Kerr, Marvin Mariche, John McDowell, Jake Shannon, Samuel Terranova, Rohit Thakur and Caden Tolentino. The agreements allowed the players to train and play with the first team while maintaining their college eligibility.

Mariche later signed a professional contract in September. He had already made three first-team appearances before signing the contract and had previously represented the club under an academy contract.

=== Coaching and management ===
John Bradford began his second season as North Carolina FC's head coach in 2022. On June 15, the club announced that Bradford had signed a multi-year contract extension. The club cited his role in developing the organization's youth-to-professional pathway as one of the reasons for continuing the relationship.

=== Transfers and loans ===
North Carolina FC added several players during the offseason, including Oalex Anderson, Jordan Skelton, Christian Lue Young, Gustavo Fernandes, Garrett McLaughlin, Jaden Servania, Showkat Tahir and Raheem Somersall. The club also retained players including Max Flick, Pecka, Luis Arriaga, Nelson Flores Blanco and Nelson Martinez.

On March 9, goalkeeper Will Pulisic joined North Carolina FC on loan from Austin FC for the 2022 season. Austin FC retained the right to recall him during the loan period.

=== Preseason ===
North Carolina FC scheduled five preseason matches ahead of the regular season. The club defeated UNCG 1–0 on February 19 and UNC Wilmington 3–0 on February 26. The remaining scheduled matches were against Columbus Crew 2, Richmond Kickers and Charlotte Independence.

February 19, 2022 Preseason 1	North Carolina FC	1–0	UNC Greensboro	Cary, North Carolina
		Report		Stadium: WakeMed Soccer Park

February 26, 2022 Preseason 2	North Carolina FC	3–0	UNC Wilmington	Cary, North Carolina
		Report		Stadium: WakeMed Soccer Park

March 9, 2022 Preseason 3	North Carolina FC	v	Columbus Crew 2	Cary, North Carolina
1:00 PM EST				Stadium: WakeMed Soccer Park

March 19, 2022 Preseason 4	North Carolina FC	v	Richmond Kickers	Cary, North Carolina
2:00 PM EDT				Stadium: WakeMed Soccer Park

March 26, 2022 Preseason 5	Charlotte Independence	v	North Carolina FC	Charlotte, North Carolina
				Stadium: American Legion Memorial Stadium

== Competitions ==
=== USL League One ===
North Carolina FC opened its league season on April 2 with a 1–0 away victory over South Georgia Tormenta FC. The club then lost 3–1 at home to Chattanooga Red Wolves SC before drawing 1–1 with Greenville Triumph SC. After four matches, North Carolina had one win, one draw and two losses.

The club's best period came in May and June, when it recorded victories over FC Tucson, Greenville Triumph and Charlotte Independence. The 2–0 victory over Charlotte on June 18 was North Carolina FC's largest league win of the season.

The team struggled to maintain that form during the second half of the season. A series of defeats against Chattanooga, Tormenta, Richmond, Union Omaha, FC Tucson, Charlotte and others left the club outside the playoff positions. The September 10 home match against Central Valley Fuego FC was postponed because of travel difficulties and was ultimately played on September 28, when North Carolina FC won 2–1. Garrett McLaughlin scored his 14th league goal of the season and 16-year-old Nicolás Rincón scored his first professional goal for the winning goal.

North Carolina FC then drew 1–1 with Union Omaha on October 1 before losing 1–0 to Chattanooga Red Wolves SC in its final home match on October 8. The club ended the regular season on October 15 with a 5–1 defeat away to Charlotte Independence.

==== Standings ====
Pos	Team	Pld	W	L	T	GF	GA	GD	Pts
7	Northern Colorado Hailstorm FC	30	11	10	9	42	38	+4	42
8	Central Valley Fuego FC	30	11	12	7	37	40	−3	40
9	Forward Madison FC	30	7	11	12	34	44	−10	33
10	FC Tucson	30	8	14	8	34	44	−10	32
11	North Carolina FC	30	8	16	6	35	53	−18	30

Source: USL League One
Rules for classification: 1) points; 2) total wins; 3) total goal differential; 4) total goals scored; 5) points earned against top four Conference finishers; 6) disciplinary points; 7) drawing of lots.

==== Match results ====
Date	Opponent	Venue	Result	Score	Attendance
April 2	Tormenta FC	Away	W	1–0	1,209
April 9	Chattanooga Red Wolves SC	Home	L	1–3	2,006
April 16	Greenville Triumph SC	Home	D	1–1	1,522
April 30	Northern Colorado Hailstorm FC	Home	L	1–2	1,723
May 7	FC Tucson	Away	W	2–1	908
May 14	Tormenta FC	Home	L	2–3	1,056
May 21	Greenville Triumph SC	Home	W	1–0	1,128
May 28	Richmond Kickers	Home	W	2–1	1,128
June 8	Northern Colorado Hailstorm FC	Away	D	1–1	516
June 18	Charlotte Independence	Home	W	2–0	1,967
June 25	Central Valley Fuego FC	Away	L	2–3	1,753
June 29	Greenville Triumph SC	Away	L	1–3	

April 2, 2022 1	Tormenta FC	0–1	North Carolina FC	Statesboro, Georgia
7:30 PM EDT	Bosua (yellow card) 6'; Soto (yellow card) 79'	Report	Tahir (yellow card) 1'; Anderson (yellow card) 18'; McLaughlin 22'; Martinez (yellow card) 78' (yellow-red card) 79'	Stadium: Optim Health Systems Field; Attendance: 1,209; Referee: Kyle Johnston

April 9, 2022 2	North Carolina FC	1–3	Chattanooga Red Wolves	Cary, North Carolina
7:00 PM EDT	Skelton (yellow card) 16'; McLaughlin 19'; Servania (yellow card) 36'; Blanco (yellow card) 85'	Report	Luna (yellow card) 38'; Ortiz 60'; España (yellow card) 64', (goal) 67'; Lombardi 70'; Hernández (yellow card) 74'; Cardona (yellow card) 88'	Stadium: WakeMed Soccer Park; Attendance: 2,006; Referee: John Griggs

April 16, 2022 3	North Carolina FC	1–1	Greenville Triumph	Cary, North Carolina
7:00 PM EDT	Servania (yellow card) 31'; McLaughlin 35'	Report	Lee (yellow card) 5' (yellow-red card) 67'; Evans 19'	Stadium: WakeMed Soccer Park; Attendance: 1,522; Referee: Danielle Chesky

April 30, 2022 4	North Carolina FC	1–2	Hailstorm FC	Cary, North Carolina
7:00 PM EDT	Flick (yellow card) 17'; Anderson 23'; Fernandes (yellow card) 81'; Pecka (yellow card) 88'; Young (yellow card) 88'	Report	Parra 18'; Ulysse (yellow card) 36'; Nortey (yellow card) 51'; Rogers (yellow card) 65'; Robles 80'; Hernández (yellow card) 89'; Scally (yellow card) 90+2'; Cornwall (yellow card) 90+5'	Stadium: WakeMed Soccer Park; Attendance: 1,723; Referee: William Steffen

May 7, 2022 5	FC Tucson	1–2	North Carolina FC	Tucson, Arizona
10:00 PM EDT	Mastrantonio (yellow card) 8'; Corfe 9'; Fahling (yellow card) 35'; Crull (yellow card) 49'; Bedoya (yellow card) 86'	TUC Report; NCA Report	Servania (yellow card) 45+3' (goal) 68'; Anderson 90+2' (pen.)	Stadium: Kino Sports Complex; Attendance: 908; Referee: Killian Richardson

May 14, 2022 6	North Carolina FC	2–3	Tormenta FC	Cary, North Carolina
5:00 PM EDT	McLaughlin 10'; Young (yellow card) 24'; Anderson 59'	Report	Phelps (yellow card) 2'; Sharifi (yellow card) 23', (goal) 41'; Sterling 31', (yellow card) 35'; Bosua 83'	Stadium: WakeMed Soccer Park; Attendance: 1,056; Referee: Wes Caouette

May 21, 2022 7	North Carolina FC	1–0	Greenville Triumph	Cary, North Carolina
7:00 PM EDT	Arriaga 7', (yellow card) 62'; Martinez (yellow card) 74'; McLaughlin (yellow card) 90+3'; Blanco (yellow card) 90+7'	Report	Smart (yellow card) 35'	Stadium: WakeMed Soccer Park; Attendance: 1,128; Referee: Calin Radosav

May 28, 2022 8	North Carolina FC	2–1	Richmond Kickers	Cary, North Carolina
7:00 PM EDT	McLaughlin 36', 42' (pen.); Skelton (yellow card) 37'; Fernandes (yellow card) 65'	Report	Terzaghi 13'; Bentley (yellow card) 28'; Aune (yellow card) 35'; Ritchie (yellow card) 64'	Stadium: WakeMed Soccer Park; Attendance: 1,128; Referee: Katherine McCormick

June 8, 2022 9	Hailstorm FC	1–1	North Carolina FC	Windsor, Colorado
9:00 PM EDT	Parra 37', (yellow card) 81'; Ulysse (yellow card) 39'; Rogers (yellow card) 45'; Cornwall (yellow card) 51'; Scally (yellow card) 84'	Report	Tahir 16'; Young (yellow card) 22'; Martinez (yellow card) 28'	Stadium: Future Legends Complex; Attendance: 516; Referee: Dejan Susak

June 18, 2022 10	North Carolina FC	2–0	Charlotte Independence	Cary, North Carolina
7:00 PM EDT	Frame (yellow card) 8'; Fernandes (yellow card) 30'; Blanco (yellow card) 32'; Young (yellow card) 51'; Molina 62', (yellow card) 69'; McLaughlin 88' (pen.)	Report	Hegardt (yellow card) 33'; Dutey (yellow card) 45' (yellow-red card) 86'; Santos (yellow card) 52'	Stadium: WakeMed Soccer Park; Attendance: 1,967; Referee: DeShun Beard

June 25, 2022 11	Fuego FC	3–2	North Carolina FC	Fresno, California
10:30 PM EDT	Ramos (yellow card) 17'; S. Chavez (yellow card) 18'; Dulysse (yellow card) 22'; Schenfeld 30'; Chaney 45+5', 75'; Antman (yellow card) 65'; Diaz (yellow card) 80'	Report	Servania (yellow card) 18'; Anderson 37', 66'; Fernandes (yellow card) 45+2'; McLaughlin 90'	Stadium: Fresno State Soccer Stadium; Attendance: 1,753; Referee: Michael Zapata

June 29, 2022 12	Greenville Triumph	3–1	North Carolina FC	Greenville, South Carolina
7:00 PM EDT	Gavilanes 9'; Pilato (yellow card) 22'; Labovitz 55'; Keegan 59'	Report	Young (yellow card) 85'; Molina 90+4'	Stadium: Legacy Early College Field; Referee: Aleksandar Zhelyazkov

July 2, 2022 13	Richmond Kickers	4–1	North Carolina FC	Richmond, Virginia
7:00 PM EDT	Bentley (yellow card) 25'; Payne (yellow card) 38'; Terzaghi 59', 79'; Bolanos 63', (yellow card) 64'; Gordon 75'	Report	Young (yellow card) 33'; Anderson 41', 42'; Somersall (yellow card) 65'	Stadium: City Stadium; Attendance: 4,702; Referee: Thomas Snyder

July 9, 2022 14	North Carolina FC	1–1	Union Omaha	Cary, North Carolina
7:00 PM EDT	Servania (yellow card) 32', (goal) 39'; Martinez (yellow card) 83'; Somersall (yellow card) 88'	Report	Bawa (yellow card) 35'; Meza 63'	Stadium: WakeMed Soccer Park; Attendance: 1,279; Referee: Izlen Peksenar

July 16, 2022 15	Chattanooga Red Wolves	2–1	North Carolina FC	East Ridge, Tennessee
7:30 PM EDT	Galindrez 13' (pen.); Cardona (yellow card) 17'; Navarro (yellow card) 40'; Mentzingen 42'; Hernández (yellow card) 88'; Avilez (yellow card) 90+5'	Report	Skelton (yellow card) 1'; Blanco (yellow card) 30'; Fernandes (yellow card) 33'; Martinez (yellow card) 47'; Arriaga 68'; Tahir (yellow card) 90+2'	Stadium: CHI Memorial Stadium; Attendance: 2,351; Referee: Alejo Calume

July 23, 2022 16	Tormenta FC	2–1	North Carolina FC	Statesboro, Georgia
7:30 PM EDT	Sterling 27' (pen.), 81'; Otieno (yellow card) 24'	Report	Fernandes (yellow card) 13'; Blanco (yellow card) 49'; Servania (yellow card) 68', (goal) 79'; Adams (yellow card) 90'	Stadium: Optim Health Systems Field; Attendance: 573; Referee: José Lara

July 27, 2022 17	North Carolina FC	2–3	Richmond Kickers	Cary, North Carolina
7:00 PM EDT	Adams 26'; Flick 78'	Report	Molina 59' (o.g.); Terzaghi 90+1'; Barnathan 90+5'	Stadium: WakeMed Soccer Park; Attendance: 1,109; Referee: Josiah Parke

August 10, 2022 19	North Carolina FC	2–1	Forward Madison	Cary, North Carolina
7:00 PM EDT	Somersall (yellow card) 35'; McLaughlin 47' (pen.); Lue Young 90+7'	Report	Leonard (yellow card) 5'; Thiam 24'; Maldonado (yellow card) 28' (yellow-red card) 86'	Stadium: WakeMed Soccer Park; Attendance: 1,034; Referee: Shawn Tehini

August 13, 2022 20	North Carolina FC	0–1	Fuego FC	Cary, North Carolina
7:00 PM EDT	Martinez (yellow card) 19'; Servania (yellow card) 78'; Tahir (yellow card) 90+4'	Report	Smith 34'; Dieye (yellow card) 40'; Gillingham (yellow card) 45+2'; Bijev (yellow card) 61'; Chaney (yellow card) 90+8'	Stadium: WakeMed Soccer Park; Attendance: 5,092; Referee: Joshua Encarnación

August 20, 2022 21	Union Omaha	4–1	North Carolina FC	Papillion, Nebraska
8:00 PM EDT	Piedrahita 1'; Hertzog 6'; Meza 17', 58'; Touche (yellow card) 29'; Gordon (yellow card) 52'; Galván (yellow card) 90+2'	Report	Blanco (red card) 49'; Fernandes (yellow card) 55'; Fischer (yellow card) 68' (yellow-red card) 68'; McLaughlin 90+1'	Stadium: Werner Park; Attendance: 2,236; Referee: Chris Ruska

August 24, 2022 22	Forward Madison	0–0	North Carolina FC	Madison, Wisconsin
8:00 PM EDT	Osmond (yellow card) 36'; Maldonado (yellow card) 57'; Torres (yellow card) 73'; Streng (yellow card) 90+2'	Report	Flick (yellow card) 68'; Fernandes (yellow card) 73'; Anderson (yellow card) 81'	Stadium: Breese Stevens Field; Attendance: 4,065; Referee: Alex Beehler

August 27, 2022 23	North Carolina FC	1–1	FC Tucson	Cary, North Carolina
7:00 PM EDT	Tahir 18'; Servania (yellow card) 32'; Adams (yellow card) 77'; Young (yellow card) 78'	Report	Mastrantonio (yellow card) 47'; Delgado (yellow card) 54'; Perez 81'	Stadium: WakeMed Soccer Park; Attendance: 1,756; Referee: Josiah Parke

September 3, 2022 24	Hailstorm FC	4–1	North Carolina FC	Windsor, Colorado
9:00 PM EDT	Cornwall (yellow card) 7'; McLean 15'; Amann 31', 45+4', (yellow card) 74', (penalty scored) 79'; Desdunes (yellow card) 34'; Robles (yellow card) 51'; Rogers (yellow card) 60'	Report	Fernandes (yellow card) 32'; Somersall (yellow card) 47'; Skelton (yellow card) 50'; McLaughlin (penalty scored) 83'	Stadium: Future Legends Complex; Attendance: 473; Referee: Dejan Susak

September 17, 2022 26	Forward Madison	1–2	North Carolina FC	Madison, Wisconsin
6:00 PM EDT	Murillo (yellow card) 13'; Osmond (yellow card) 18'; Gebhard (yellow card) 45+4'; Maldonado (yellow card) 50'; Bartman 81'; Rad (yellow card) 90+2'	Report	McLaughlin 4'; Fernandes (yellow card) 24'; Adams 90+3'	Stadium: Breese Stevens Field; Attendance: 4,456; Referee: Joshua Encarnación

September 20, 2022 18	FC Tucson	1–0	North Carolina FC	Tucson, Arizona
10:00 PM EDT	Mastrantonio (yellow card) 21'; L. Perez (penalty scored) 66'	Report	Somersall (yellow card) 44'; McLaughlin (yellow card) 48'; Arriaga (yellow card) 62'; Young (yellow card) 68'	Stadium: Kino Sports Complex; Attendance: 855; Referee: Shay Yinka-Kehinde
Note: Match originally scheduled for July 30 and postponed because of travel and weather-related issues.

September 24, 2022 27	Charlotte Independence	2–1	North Carolina FC	Charlotte, North Carolina
7:00 PM EDT	Hegardt 10'; Acosta (yellow card) 12'; Dutey (yellow card) 17'; Ciss (yellow card) 35', (goal) 45+1'; Obertan (red card) 79'; Dimick (yellow card) 90+6'	Report	McLaughlin (penalty scored) 85'	Stadium: American Legion Memorial Stadium; Attendance: 3,712; Referee: Danielle Chesky

September 28, 2022 25	North Carolina FC	2–1	Fuego FC	Cary, North Carolina
7:30 PM EDT	Fernandes (yellow card) 9'; McLaughlin 22'; Skelton (yellow card) 47'; Rincón 69'; Pecka (yellow card) 90'; Servania (yellow card) 90+4'	Report	Vera (yellow card) 24'; Chaney 29', (yellow card) 90+2'; Dabo (yellow card) 58'; Falck (yellow card) 63'; Strong (red card) 73'; Hornsby (yellow card) 76'; Dulysse (yellow card) 90+4'	Stadium: WakeMed Soccer Park; Attendance: 1,351; Referee: Josiah Parke
Note: Rescheduled from September 10 after the original match was postponed because of travel difficulties.

October 1, 2022 28	North Carolina FC	1–1	Union Omaha	Cary, North Carolina
7:00 PM EDT	Anderson 82'	Report	Touche (yellow card) 6'; Hertzog 25'; Gil (yellow card) 66'; Scearce (yellow card) 81'; Brewer (yellow card) 85'	Stadium: WakeMed Soccer Park; Attendance: 1,608; Referee: John Matto

October 8, 2022 29	North Carolina FC	0–1	Chattanooga Red Wolves	Cary, North Carolina
7:00 PM EDT	Skelton (yellow card) 25'; Blanco (yellow card) 32' (yellow-red card) 75'; Rincón (yellow card) 33'; Martinez (yellow card) 43'; Pecka (yellow card) 57'; Molina (yellow card) 78'; Pulisic (yellow card) 79'	Report	España (yellow card) 28'; Galindrez 49'; Páez (yellow card) 90+2'; Carrera (yellow card) 90+3'	Stadium: WakeMed Soccer Park; Attendance: 4,873; Referee: Matthew Franz

October 15, 2022 30	Charlotte Independence	5–1	North Carolina FC	Charlotte, North Carolina
7:00 PM EDT	Hegardt 35'; Obertan 40', 54'; Mbuyu 59'; Dutey (yellow card) 66'; Bennett (yellow card) 75'; Shevtsov 84'	Report	Skelton (yellow card) 17'; Young (yellow card) 41'; Anderson 53'; Servania (yellow card) 61'	Stadium: American Legion Memorial Stadium; Attendance: 4,107; Referee: Brandon Stevis

=== U.S. Open Cup ===
North Carolina FC entered the 2022 U.S. Open Cup in the second round, where it hosted USL Championship club Rio Grande Valley FC Toros on April 6. The visitors won 2–1, eliminating North Carolina FC from the competition.

April 6, 2022 Second round	North Carolina FC	1–2	Rio Grande Valley FC Toros	Cary, North Carolina
7:00 PM EDT	Blanco (yellow card) 10'; Servania 45'; Anderson (yellow card) 53'; Young (yellow card) 77'; Tolentino (yellow card) 90+4'	Report	Nodarse (yellow card) 45+2', (goal) 79'; López 54'; Ricketts (yellow card) 90+2'	Stadium: WakeMed Soccer Park; Attendance: 575; Referee: John Rush

== Statistics ==
=== Goalscorers ===
Garrett McLaughlin was North Carolina FC's leading league scorer with 14 goals. His total placed him second in the USL League One Golden Boot standings and earned him selection to the league's All-League First Team.

Player	League goals
Garrett McLaughlin	14
Oalex Anderson	7
Jaden Servania	3
Nicolás Molina	2
Showkat Tahir	2
Luis Arriaga	1
Shak Adams	1
Christian Lue Young	1
Nicolás Rincón	1
Max Flick	1
Own goals	3

=== Attendance ===
North Carolina FC's average reported home attendance for the 2022 regular season was 1,874. The largest reported league crowd was 5,092 for the August 13 match against Central Valley Fuego FC. The smallest reported league attendance was 1,034 for the August 10 match against Forward Madison FC. The U.S. Open Cup match against Rio Grande Valley FC Toros drew 575 spectators.

The 5,092 attendance figure was the club's largest reported home crowd of the season. The October 8 home finale against Chattanooga Red Wolves SC drew 4,873 spectators, while the October 15 away finale against Charlotte Independence drew 4,107.

== Season summary ==
North Carolina FC improved on its 12th-place finish in 2021 by moving up one position to 11th in 2022. The improvement in position did not result in a playoff berth because the club remained outside the top six throughout the final stages of the season. The team finished with 30 points from 30 matches, scoring 35 goals and conceding 53.

McLaughlin provided the main source of goals, scoring 14 times in league play. Anderson contributed seven goals, while Servania scored three. The club's defensive record was less successful, as its 53 goals conceded were the most in USL League One during the regular season.

The season also continued the club's emphasis on youth development. Academy players received opportunities to train and play with the first team, while Rincón became one of the most notable examples of the pathway when he scored his first professional goal in September at age 16. He was named USL League One Player of the Week after contributing a goal and an assist in the 2–1 win over Central Valley Fuego FC.
