= 2021 FC Tucson season =

FC Tucson
2021 season
- Owner: Benevolent Sports Tucson, LLC
- Manager: John Galas (2-4-3); Jon Pearlman (9-6-4)
- Stadium: Kino North Stadium
- USL1 Playoffs: Semifinals
- Top goalscorer: Charlie Dennis (9)
- Highest home attendance: 1,793 (November 6 vs Richmond Kickers, USL1 Playoff Quarterfinal)
- Lowest home attendance: 654 (August 28 vs Greenville Triumph SC)
- Average home league attendance: 1,050; One result missing
- Biggest win: 4–0; August 22 vs. Ft. Lauderdale
- Biggest defeat: 1–5; May 16 vs. Ft. Lauderdale
Home colors	Away colors

The 2021 FC Tucson season was the eleventh season in the soccer team's history and their third in USL League One. On February 18, 2021, Phoenix Rising FC transferred ownership of FC Tucson to Benevolent Sports Tucson LLC, led by Rising co-owner Brett Johnson.

== Players and staff ==
=== Roster ===
No.	Name	Nationality	Position(s)	Date of birth (age)	Signed in	Previous club	Apps.	Goals
Goalkeepers
1	Wallis Lapsley	(United States)	GK	April 14, 1997 (age 29)	2021	(United States) New York Red Bulls II	0	0
12	Ryan Shellow	(United States)	GK	October 10, 1997 (age 28)	2021	(United States) Cornell University	0	0
18	Jim Barkei	(United States)	GK	December 21, 1995 (age 30)	2021	(United States) Memphis 901 FC	0	0
30	Emiliano Andraux	(United States)	GK	May 2, 2002 (age 24)	2020	(United States) FC Tucson Academy	0	0
Defenders
3	Alex Knox	(United States)	DF	June 21, 1997 (age 29)	2021	(United States) UCLA	0	0
4	Luca Mastrantonio	(Italy)	DF	May 27, 1996 (age 30)	2021	(United States) UC Irvine	0	0
5	Kaelon Fox	(United States)	DF	May 31, 1995 (age 31)	2021	(Iceland) Þór Akureyri	0	0
15	Noah Franke	(United States)	DF	March 25, 1995 (age 31)	2021	(United States) Pittsburgh Riverhounds SC	0	0
19	Maxi Schenfeld	(Chile)	DF	October 18, 1992 (age 33)	2021	(United States) FC Tulsa	0	0
23	Luke Lawrence	(United States)	DF	August 22, 2001 (age 25)	2021	(United States) Barça Residency Academy	0	0
24	Dakota Barnathan	(United States)	DF	November 9, 1994 (age 31)	2021	(United States) Pittsburgh Riverhounds SC	0	0
58	Miles Lyons	(United States)	DF	January 1, 2001 (age 25)	2021	(United States) Barça Residency Academy	0	0
Midfielders
8	Daniel Bedoya	(Colombia)	MF	February 13, 1994 (age 32)	2021	(United States) New Amsterdam FC	0	0
10	Charlie Dennis	(England)	MF	April 21, 1998 (age 28)	2020	(United States) Tormenta FC	15	0
11	Kevin Rodriguez	(United States)	MF	September 25, 1996 (age 29)	2021	(United States) Rio Grande Valley FC	0	0
14	Gerard Lavergne	(Dominican Republic)	MF	January 25, 1999 (age 27)	2021	(Dominican Republic) Atlético Pantoja	0	0
20	João Delgado	(Portugal)	MF	January 16, 1994 (age 32)	2021	(United States) Reading United AC	0	0
21	Manuel Ferriol	(Spain)	MF	August 13, 1998 (age 28)	2020	(United States) James Madison University	9	0
22	Nathan Hurtado	(United States)	MF	September 7, 2003 (age 23)	2021	(United States) Barça Residency Academy	0	0
27	Jordan Pena	(United States)	MF	May 21, 2000 (age 26)	2020	(United States) Real Monarchs	5	0
31	Brandon Sanchez	(United States)	MF	September 12, 2003 (age 23)	2021	(United States) FC Tucson Academy	1	0
38	Jerod Allen	(United States)	MF	August 17, 2004 (age 22)	2021		0	0
42	Jared Odenbeck	(United States)	MF	February 4, 1995 (age 31)	2021	(United States) Stumptown Athletic	0	0
88	Mohamed Kone	(Burkina Faso)	MF/DF	December 12, 1993 (age 32)	2021	(United States) New Amsterdam FC	0	0
Forwards
7	Tobenna Uzo	(Nigeria)	FW	October 13, 1994 (age 31)	2021	(United States) FC Arizona	0	0
9	Deri Corfe	(England)	FW	March 3, 1998 (age 28)	2021	(United States) New York Red Bulls II	0	0
14	Alioune Diakhate	(Senegal)	FW	April 10, 1994 (age 32)	2021	(United States) Indy Eleven	0	0
17	Shak Adams	(United States)	FW	September 7, 1998 (age 28)	2021	(United States) Seattle Sounders FC U-23	31	4
37	Franco Pérez	(Argentina)	FW	January 1, 1996 (age 30)	2021	(Argentina) Estudiantes de Río Cuarto (loan)	0	0
91	Gio Calixtro	(United States)	FW	June 27, 2000 (age 26)	2021	(United States) Portland Timbers 2	0	0

USL Academy contract.

=== Coaching staff ===
Name	Position
(United States) Jon Pearlman	Head coach
(United States) Mark Biagi	Assistant coach
(United States) Vito Higgins	Assistant coach & Academy Head Coach
(United States) Alex Rangel	Goalkeeper coach

=== Front Office Staff ===
Name	Position
(United States) Amanda Powers	President
(United States) Jon Pearlman	Director of Soccer Operations

== Competitions ==
=== Exhibitions ===
March 31, 2021 Preseason 1	FC Tucson	1–2	Colorado Rapids	Tucson, Arizona
1:00 PM MST	Adams 10'	COL Report	Rosenberry 26'; Shinyashiki 31'	Stadium: Kino North Stadium
Note: 40 Minute Game

March 31, 2021 Preseason 2	FC Tucson	2–1	LA Galaxy II	Tucson, Arizona
3:00 PM MST	Adams; Fox	TUC Report		Stadium: Kino North Stadium
Note: 40 Minute Game

April 7, 2021 Preseason 3	FC Tucson	0–5	El Paso Locomotive FC	Tucson, Arizona
11:00 AM MST		ELP Report	Apodaca (?); Luna (?); Aquinaga (?)	Stadium: Kino North Stadium

April 13, 2021 Preseason 4	FC Tucson	3–1	FC Arizona	Tucson, Arizona
7:00 PM MST				Stadium: Kino North Stadium

April 17, 2021 Preseason 5	New Mexico United	3–1	FC Tucson	Albuquerque, New Mexico
11:00 AM MST	Suggs 29'; Schmidt 49'; Moreno 72'		Calixtro 30'

April 24, 2021 Preseason 6	Phoenix Rising FC	2–1	FC Tucson	Chandler, Arizona
11:00 AM MST	Adekoya 42', 50'	PHX Report	Calixtro 70'	Stadium: Wild Horse Pass Stadium

=== USL League One ===
==== Standings ====
Pos	Team	Pld	W	D	L	GF	GA	GD	Pts	Qualification
2	Greenville Triumph SC	28	12	9	7	36	29	+7	45	Qualification for the semi-finals
3	Chattanooga Red Wolves SC	28	11	11	6	37	29	+8	44	Qualification for the play-offs
4	FC Tucson	28	11	7	10	44	42	+2	40	Qualification for the play-offs
5	Richmond Kickers	28	11	7	10	35	36	−1	40	Qualification for the play-offs
6	North Texas SC	28	10	10	8	40	32	+8	40	Qualification for the play-offs

Source: USL League One
Rules for classification: 1) points; 2) total wins; 3) total goal differential; 4) total goals scored; 5) points earned against top four Conference finishers; 6) disciplinary points; 7) drawing of lots.

=== Results summary ===
Overall								Home						Away					
Pld	W	D	L	GF	GA	GD	Pts	W	D	L	GF	GA	GD	W	D	L	GF	GA	GD
28	11	7	10	44	42	+2	40	6	2	6	23	21	+2	5	5	4	21	21	0

Source: USL League One

Round	1	2	3	4	5	6	7	8	9	10	11	12	13	14	15	16	17	18	19	20	21	22	23	24	25	26	27	28
Stadium	A	H	A	A	A	H	H	A	A	H	A	H	H	A	H	H	A	H	A	A	H	A	A	H	H	H	A	H
Result	L	D	L	W	W	D	L	D	L	W	D	W	L	L	L	L	W	W	W	D	W	D	W	L	L	W	D	W
Position	12	10	10	9	9	7	9	11	11	10	11	10	10	11	11	11	11	11	4	5	4	4	3	5	6	6	7	4

Source: USL League One
A = Away; H = Home; W = Win; D = Draw; L = Loss

==== Match results ====
May 1, 2021 1	Tormenta FC	3–1	FC Tucson	Statesboro, Georgia
7:00 PM EDT	Gómez (yellow card) 3'; Phelps 10'; Thorn 30'; O'Callaghan (yellow card) 34'; Micaletto (yellow card) 65' (goal) 88'	TUC Report; TRM Report	Adams 45'; Ferriol (yellow card) 62'	Stadium: Eagle Field; Attendance: 635; Referee: Kyle Johnston

May 8, 2021 2	FC Tucson	1–1	Forward Madison FC	Tucson, Arizona
7:00 PM MST	Franke (yellow card) 17'; Dennis (yellow card) 45+1'; Corfe 51'; Ferriol (yellow card) 82'	TUC Report; MAD Report	Fernandes (yellow card) 20'; Toyama (yellow card) 28'; Keegan 67'; Molloy (yellow card) 81'	Stadium: Kino Sports Complex; Attendance: 680; Referee: Joseph Salinas

May 16, 2021 3	Fort Lauderdale CF	5–1	FC Tucson	Fort Lauderdale, Florida
4:30 MST	Caputo 2'; Poplawski (yellow card) 9'; Hardin (yellow card) 36'; Lue Young 39'; Acosta 48'; Evans 77' 87'	TUC Report; FTL Report	Schenfeld (yellow card) 33'; Franke (yellow card) 63' (red card) 90+5'; Delgado 75'; Ferriol (yellow card) 80'; Mastrantonio (yellow card) 86'	Stadium: DRV PNK Stadium; Referee: Alejo Calume

May 26, 2021 4	Toronto FC II	1–2	FC Tucson	Casa Grande, Arizona
7:00 MST	Antonoglou 37'	TUC Report	Schenfeld (yellow card) 15'; Delgado 24'; Corfe 28'; Dennis (yellow card) 52'	Stadium: Grande Sports Complex; Attendance: 0 Referee: Samantha Martinez

May 29, 2021 5	North Carolina FC	1–2	FC Tucson	Cary, North Carolina
TBD	Miscic 9'; Simpson (yellow card) 71'	NCA Report	Pearson 11' (o.g.); Bedoya (yellow card) 17'; Schenfeld (yellow card) 37'; Ferriol (yellow card) 39' (goal) 50'; Pérez (yellow card) 86' (red card) 90+4'	Stadium: WakeMed Soccer Park; Attendance: 1,060; Referee: Izlen Peksenar

June 5, 2021 6	FC Tucson	1–1	Toronto FC II	Tucson, Arizona
7:00 PM MST	Calixtro 21'; Schenfeld (yellow card) 38' (red card) 86'	TUC Report	Antonoglou 16'; McLaughlin (yellow card) 78'	Stadium: Kino Sports Complex; Attendance: 747; Referee: Héctor Hernández

June 12, 2021 7	FC Tucson	2–3	Chattanooga Red Wolves	Tucson, Arizona
7:00 PM MST	Pena (yellow card) 10'; Bedoya (yellow card) 30'; Barnathan (yellow card) 32'; Calixtro (yellow card) 45+6'; Dennis 61', 85' (yellow card) 71'	TUC Report	Ricketts (yellow card) 11' (goal) 44'; Ruiz 28'; España (yellow card) 34'; García (yellow card) 69'; Galindrez 89' (yellow card) 90'	Stadium: Kino Sports Complex; Attendance: 995; Referee: Karen Callado

June 19, 2021 8	North Texas SC	0–0	FC Tucson	Arlington, Texas
5:30 PM CDT	Waldeck (yellow card) 42'; Maldonado (yellow card) 63'; Almaguer (red card) 82'	TUC Report; NTX Report	Fox (yellow card) 41'; Franke (red card) 57'; Calixtro (yellow card) 62' (red card) 90+3'; Barnathan (yellow card) 90+5'	Stadium: Globe Life Park in Arlington; Attendance: 726; Referee: Katja Koroleva

June 26, 2021 9	Union Omaha	1–0	FC Tucson	Omaha, Nebraska
5:00 PM CDT	Hurst 6'; Otieno (yellow card) 42'; Knutson (yellow card) 78'; Firmino (yellow card) 90+3'		Ferriol (yellow card) 45+2'; Corfe (yellow card) 61'; Schenfeld (yellow card) 90+6'; Fox (yellow card) 90+7'	Stadium: Werner Park; Referee: Matt Grarenger

July 3, 2021 10	FC Tucson	2–1	Fort Lauderdale CF	Tucson, Arizona
7:00 PM MST	Corfe 34'; Franke (yellow card) 39'; Schenfeld (yellow card) 62'; Ferriol 74'	TUC Report	Azcona (yellow card) 10', (goal) 48', (red card) 82'; Neville (yellow card) 63'	Stadium: Kino Sports Complex; Attendance: 1,545; Referee: William Hoffman

July 10, 2021 11	Chattanooga Red Wolves SC	2–2	FC Tucson	East Ridge, Tennessee
4:00 PM MST	España (yellow card) 23'; Esparza (yellow card) 30'; Ruiz 34' (yellow card) 80'; Galindrez 64'; Hernández (yellow card) 84'; Navarro (yellow card) 85'; Pineda (yellow card) 90+8'	TUC Report	Schenfeld (yellow card) 4'; Knox (yellow card) 80'; Bedoya 86' (pen.); Adams 89'; Delgado (yellow card) 90+6'	Stadium: CHI Memorial Stadium; Referee: Jervis Atagana

July 17, 2021 12	FC Tucson	4–2	New England Revolution II	Tucson, Arizona
7:00 PM MDT	Bedoya 23' (yellow card) 53'; Adams 26'; Uzo 47', 75'; Schenfeld (red card) 90+2'	TUC Report; NEW Report	Verfurth (yellow card) 6'; Rivera 34'; Kizza (yellow card) 45+2'; Michel (yellow card) 55'; Rozhansky (yellow card) 76'; Sierakowski 81'	Stadium: Kino Sports Complex; Attendance: 825; Referee: Adorae Monroy

July 24, 2021 13	FC Tucson	1–2	Union Omaha	Tucson, Arizona
7:00 PM MST	Bedoya (yellow card) 49'; Dennis (yellow card) 67'; Adams 74'; Fox (yellow card) 90+4'	TUC Report	Sousa (yellow card) 23'; Viader 44'; Hurst 51'; Murphy (yellow card) 84'	Stadium: Kino Sports Complex; Attendance: 715; Referee: Gerald Flores

July 31, 2021 14	Richmond Kickers	1–0	FC Tucson	Richmond, Virginia
6:30 PM EDT	Terzaghi 19' (pen.); Alves (yellow card) 52'; Magalhães (yellow card) 53'; Fitzgerald (yellow card) 86'; Pavone (yellow card) 90+5'	TUC Report; RIC Report	Bedoya (yellow card) 32'; Schenfeld (yellow card) 44'; Uzo (yellow card) 57'; Ferriol (yellow card) 77'; Dennis (yellow card) 84'; Corfe (yellow card) 90+1'	Stadium: City Stadium; Attendance: 2,691; Referee: Sara Griggs

August 7, 2021 15	FC Tucson	0–2	North Texas SC	Tucson, Arizona
7:00 PM MST	Ferriol (yellow card) 16'; Schenfeld (yellow card) 19'; Rodriguez (yellow card) 90+4'	TUC Report; NTX Report	Rayo 14'; Kazu 30' (yellow card) 48'; Munjoma (yellow card) 78'	Stadium: Kino Sports Complex; Attendance: 812; Referee: DeShun Beard

August 14, 2021 16	FC Tucson	0–1	Union Omaha	Tucson, Arizona
7:00 PM MST	Knox (yellow card) 58'	TUC Report; OMA Report	Kone 19' (o.g.); Otieno (yellow card) 59'; Viader (yellow card) 75'; Doyle (yellow card) 80'	Stadium: Kino Sports Complex; Attendance: 859; Referee: Ricardo Fierro

August 21, 2021 17	Fort Lauderdale CF	0–4	FC Tucson	Fort Lauderdale, Florida
4:30 PM MST	Neville (yellow card) 31'; Mabika (yellow card) 43'	TUC Report; FTL Report	Calixtro 6', 26', 53' (yellow card) 59'; Dennis 25' (pen.); Fox (yellow card) 70'; Ferriol (yellow card) 82'	Stadium: DRV PNK Stadium; Referee: Lorenzo Hernandez

August 28, 2021 18	FC Tucson	2–1	Greenville Triumph SC	Tucson, Arizona
7:00 PM MST	Kone (yellow card) 30'; Adams 45', 58'	TUC Report; GVL Report	Hemmings (yellow card) 40'; Smart 90+2'	Stadium: Kino Sports Complex; Attendance: 654; Referee: Jalen Gray

September 1, 2021 19	New England Revolution II	1–2	FC Tucson	Foxborough, Massachusetts
7:00 PM EDT	Rivera 10'; Fujiwara (yellow card) 38'; Michel (yellow card) 90+1'	TUC Report; NEW Report	Adams 43'; Bedoya 49'; Kone (yellow card) 54'; Corfe (yellow card) 84'; Mastrantonio (yellow card) 90+3'	Stadium: Gillette Stadium; Referee: Anya Voigt

September 4, 2021 20	North Texas SC	1–1	FC Tucson	Arlington, Texas
7:00 PM CDT	Smith (yellow card) 64'; Gomes (yellow card) 73'; Kazu 77'	TUC Report; NTX Report	Uzo (yellow card) 71'; Delgado (yellow card) 74'; Corfe 81'	Stadium: Globe Life Park in Arlington; Attendance: 708; Referee: Corbyn May

September 11, 2021 21	FC Tucson	3–0	Fort Lauderdale CF	Tucson, Arizona
7:00 PM MST	Mastrantonio 19'; Kone (yellow card) 67'; Corfe 74', 90+4'	TUC Report; FTL Report	Acosta (yellow card) 67'; Hundal (yellow card) 70'	Stadium: Kino Sports Complex; Referee: Abdou Ndiaye

September 19, 2021 22	Greenville Triumph SC	3–3	FC Tucson	Greenville, South Carolina
7:00 PM EDT	Walker 17' (pen.), 34'; Brown 78'; Booth (yellow card) 90+3'	TUC Report; GVL Report	Dennis 6', 41' (pen.), 61' (yellow card) 10'; Delgado (yellow card) 12'; Corfe (yellow card) 90+2'	Stadium: Legacy Early College Field; Attendance: 1,536; Referee: Katherine McCormick

September 25, 2021 23	Union Omaha	0–1	FC Tucson	Omaha, Nebraska
7:00 PM CDT	Doyle (yellow card) 11'; Alihodžić (yellow card) 32'	TUC Report; OMA Report	Dennis 7' (pen.); Mastrantonio (yellow card) 51'; Adams (yellow card) 56'; Calixtro (yellow card) 76'; Kone (yellow card) 81'; Schenfeld (yellow card) 87'	Stadium: Morrison Stadium; Attendance: 2,217; Referee: Jervis Atagana

October 2, 2021 24	FC Tucson	0–2	North Texas SC	Tucson, Arizona
7:00 PM MST	Pérez (yellow card) 22'; Delgado (yellow card) 36'; Schenfeld (red card) 86'	TUC Report; NTX Report	Vargas (yellow card) 12'; Hernandez (yellow card) 29'; Waldeck (yellow card) 31'; ElMedkhar 33'; Almaguer 77'; Smith (yellow card) 86'	Stadium: Kino Sports Complex; Attendance: 1,076; Referee: Laura Rodriguez

October 13, 2021 25	FC Tucson	0–2	North Carolina FC	Tucson, Arizona
7:00 PM MST	Mastrantonio (yellow card) 25'; Barnathan (red card) 27'	TUC Report; NCA Report	Blanco (yellow card) 4'; Pearson (yellow card) 45' (goal) 58'; Miscic 61' (pen.); Kristo (yellow card) 79'	Stadium: Kino Sports Complex; Attendance: 1,417; Referee: Lorenzo Hernandez

October 16, 2021 26	FC Tucson	3–1	Tormenta FC	Tucson, Arizona
7:00 PM MST	Rodriguez 17', 67'; Schenfeld (yellow card) 23'; Dennis 83'	TUC Report	Micaletto (yellow card) 6'; Mueller 29'; O'Callaghan (yellow card) 61'	Stadium: Kino Sports Complex; Attendance: 1,018; Referee: Adorae Monroy

October 23, 2021 27	Forward Madison FC	2–2	FC Tucson	Madison, Wisconsin
7:00 PM CDT	Rad (yellow card) 42'; Molloy 50'; Sierakowski 90+3'	TUC Report; MAD Report	Dennis 16' (pen.); Rodriguez 24'	Stadium: Breese Stevens Field; Attendance: 3,200; Referee: Calin Radosav

October 30, 2021 28	FC Tucson	4–2	Richmond Kickers	Tucson, Arizona
7:00 PM MST	Schenfeld 24' (yellow card) 45+2'; Corfe 42'; Mastrantonio 52'; Adams 58'	TUC Report; RIC Report	Bolanos 22' (yellow card) 45'; Terzaghi 49' (pen.); Calvo (yellow card) 62'	Stadium: Kino Sports Complex; Attendance: 1,566; Referee: Joseph Salinas

=== USL League One Playoffs ===
November 6, 2021 Quarterfinals	FC Tucson	1–0	Richmond Kickers	Tucson, Arizona
7:00 pm MST	Kone (yellow card) 51'; Corfe (yellow card) 55' (goal) 87'	TUC Report; RIC Report	Bolanos (yellow card) 45+1'	Stadium: Kino North Stadium; Attendance: 1,793; Referee: Jeremy Scheer

November 13, 2021 Semifinals	Union Omaha	6–1	FC Tucson	Papillion, Nebraska
4:00 pm CST	Conway 3', 31'; Boyce (yellow card) 32' (goal) 54'; Crull (yellow card) 34'; Vlader 49'; Panchot 70'; Alihodžić 83'	TUC Report; OMA Report	Schenfeld (yellow card) 30' (red card) 32'; Dennis (yellow card) 44' (goal) 63'; Ferriol (yellow card) 66'	Stadium: Werner Park; Attendance: 3,607; Referee: Michael Radchuk

== Statistics ==
(regular-season & Playoffs)

#	Pos.	Name	GP	GS	Min.	Goals	Assists	A yellow rectangle, denoting the yellow penalty card shown to a player being cautioned	A red rectangle, denoting the red penalty card shown to a player being sent off
10	MF	(England) Charlie Dennis	27	23	2002	10	8	7	0
9	FW	(England) Deri Corfe	29	22	2008	8	2	5	0
17	FW	(United States) Shak Adams	28	21	1905	8	2	1	0
91	FW	(United States) Gio Calixtro	28	20	1681	4	4	3	1
8	MF	(Colombia) Daniel Bedoya	29	17	1571	3	3	5	0
11	MF	(United States) Kevin Rodriguez	19	7	680	3	1	1	0
20	MF	(Portugal) João Delgado	24	17	1392	2	3	4	0
4	DF	(Italy) Luca Mastrantonio	18	14	1275	2	0	4	0
21	MF	(Spain) Manuel Ferriol	22	8	904	2	1	9	0
7	FW	(Nigeria) Tobenna Uzo	12	10	820	2	0	2	0
19	DF	(Chile) Maxi Schenfeld	26	26	2244	1	0	11	4
15	DF	(United States) Noah Franke	28	28	2456	0	4	2	2
5	DF	(United States) Kaelon Fox	29	28	2370	0	1	4	0
24	DF	(United States) Dakota Barnathan	26	19	1654	0	0	2	1
88	MF	(Burkina Faso) Mohamed Kone	15	14	1184	0	1	5	0
27	MF	(United States) Jordan Pena	14	11	965	0	0	1	0
3	DF	(United States) Alex Knox	23	5	630	0	0	2	0
6	DF	(Germany) Samuel Biek	7	4	375	0	0	1	0
42	MF	(United States) Jared Odenbeck	7	4	308	0	0	0	0
37	MF	(Argentina) Franco Pérez	9	2	227	0	0	1	1
31	MF	(United States) Brandon Sanchez	2	1	71	0	0	0	0
14	FW	(Senegal) Alioune Diakhate	5	0	67	0	0	0	0
14	MF	(Dominican Republic) Gerard Lavergne	1	0	12	0	0	0	0
23	DF	(United States) Luke Lawrence	1	0	1	0	0	0	0

- One Own Goal scored by North Carolina FC

=== Goalkeepers ===
#	Name	GP	GS	Min.	SV	GA	GAA	SO	A yellow rectangle, denoting the yellow penalty card shown to a player being cautioned	A red rectangle, denoting the red penalty card shown to a player being sent off
1	(United States) Wallis Lapsley	30	30	2700	91	48	1.600	5	0	0
