= 2023 North Carolina FC season =

North Carolina FC
2023 season
- Owner: Stephen Malik
- Head coach: John Bradford
- Stadium: WakeMed Soccer Park
- USL League One: 2nd
- USL1 Playoffs: Champions
- U.S. Open Cup: 2nd Round
- Top goalscorer: League: All: Oalex Anderson (17)
- Highest home attendance: League/All: 5,795 (10/14 vs. Knoxville)
- Lowest home attendance: League/All: 1,119 (4/8 vs. Charlotte
- Average home league attendance: 2,503
- Biggest win: 3 goals (April 21 vs. Chattanooga) (September 2 at Fuego FC)
- Biggest defeat: 0–3 (June 10 at Forward Madison)

The 2023 North Carolina FC season was the 17th season of the club's existence, and their third season in USL League One, the third division of the American soccer pyramid. North Carolina was coached by John Bradford, his third season with the club, and played their home games at WakeMed Soccer Park. The club had finished at the bottom of the table in their second season in USL League One. North Carolina finished the season in 2nd place in the league table, earning a spot in the playoffs. After defeating Hailstorm FC 3–1 in the semi-finals, they defeated rival Charlotte Independence 5–4 in penalties to win the 2023 USL League One Final.
It was announced on August 7, 2023, that North Carolina will return to the USL Championship for the 2024 season.

== Club ==
=== Roster ===
As of November 5, 2023

No.	Pos.	Nation	Player
1	GK	USA	Nick Holliday
2	DF	USA	Christian Lue Young
3	DF	ESA	Nelson Blanco
4	DF	ENG	Luke Croll
5	DF	USA	Navarro
6	DF	USA	Gustavo Fernandes
7	MF	USA	Luis Arriaga
8	MF	BRA	Pecka
9	FW	VIN	Oalex Anderson
10	MF	PUR	Jaden Servania
12	GK	USA	Tor Saunders
13	MF	FRA	Louis Perez
14	FW	BRA	Rafael Mentzingen
15	FW	USA	Mikey Maldonado
17	FW	USA	Shak Adams
18	DF	USA	Devin Benton
19	FW	USA	Garrett McLaughlin
22	DF	USA	Max Flick
23	FW	USA	Marvin Mariche
24	DF	ESP	David Garcia
25	GK	USA	Trevor Mulqueen
26	MF	USA	John McDowell
31	GK	USA	Brooks Thompson
44	MF	SKN	Raheem Somersall
88	FW	CAN	Preston Popp

== Competitions ==
=== Exhibitions ===
February 11, 2023 Preseason 1	North Carolina FC	v	UNC–Chapel Hill	Cary, North Carolina
1:30 PM EST				Stadium: WakeMed Soccer Park

February 18, 2023 Preseason 2	North Carolina FC	v	One Knoxville SC	Cary, North Carolina
2:00 EST				Stadium: WakeMed Soccer Park

February 22, 2023 Preseason 3	North Carolina FC	v	New York City FC II	Cary, North Carolina
3:00 PM EST				Stadium: WakeMed Soccer Park

February 25, 2023 Preseason 4	North Carolina FC	v	Charleston Battery	Cary, North Carolina
2:00 PM EST				Stadium: WakeMed Soccer Park

March 1, 2023 Preseason 5	North Carolina FC	v	Columbus Crew 2	Cary, North Carolina
2:00 PM EST				Stadium: WakeMed Soccer Park

March 4, 2023 Preseason 6	North Carolina FC	v	Loudoun United FC	Cary, North Carolina
1:00 PM EST				Stadium: WakeMed Soccer Park

March 11, 2023 Preseason 7	North Carolina FC	v	Charlotte Independence	Cary, North Carolina
2:00 PM EST				Stadium: WakeMed Soccer Park

July 21, 2023	North Carolina FC	2–4	Sunderland A.F.C.	Cary, North Carolina
7:05 PM EDT	Mentzingen 52'; Perez 59'		Matete 5'; Batth 14'; Roberts 44'; Clarke 45+2'	Stadium: WakeMed Soccer Park

=== USL League One ===
==== Standings ====
Pos	Team	Pld	W	L	T	GF	GA	GD	Pts	Qualification
1	Union Omaha (S)	32	19	5	8	61	41	+20	65	Qualification for the semi-finals
2	North Carolina FC (C)	32	19	7	6	58	39	+19	63	Qualification for the semi-finals
3	Northern Colorado Hailstorm FC	32	18	6	8	59	37	+22	62	Qualification for the play-offs
4	Charlotte Independence	32	13	9	10	50	42	+8	49	Qualification for the play-offs
5	Greenville Triumph SC	32	13	10	9	45	40	+5	48	Qualification for the play-offs

Source: USL League One
Rules for classification: 1) points; 2) total wins; 3) total goal differential; 4) total goals scored; 5) points earned against top four Conference finishers; 6) disciplinary points; 7) drawing of lots.
(C) Champions; (S) Players' Shield winner

==== Match results ====
March 17, 2023 1	North Carolina FC	0–1	Tormenta FC	Cary, North Carolina
7:00 PM EDT		Report	Akale 34'	Stadium: WakeMed Soccer Park; Attendance: 3,429; Referee: Jeremy Scheer

April 1, 2023 2	North Carolina FC	2–1	Lexington SC	Cary, North Carolina
7:00 PM EDT		Report	Akale 34'	Stadium: WakeMed Soccer Park; Attendance: 1,423; Referee: Shawn Tehini

April 8, 2023 3	North Carolina FC	1–1	Charlotte Independence	Cary, North Carolina
7:00 PM EDT	Anderson 32'	Report	Kelly 61'	Stadium: WakeMed Soccer Park; Attendance: 1,119; Referee: Alejo Calume

April 15, 2023 4	Union Omaha	1–2	North Carolina FC	Omaha, Nebraska
3:00 PM EDT	Gallardo 84'	Report	Mentzingen 3' (pen.); Perez 43'	Stadium: Al F. Caniglia Field; Attendance: 1,665; Referee: Jervis Atagana

April 21, 2023 5	North Carolina FC	3–0	Chattanooga Red Wolves	Cary, North Carolina
7:00 PM EDT	Anderson 45'; Mentzingen 57', 66'	Report		Stadium: WakeMed Soccer Park; Attendance: 1,766; Referee: Izlen Peksenar

April 29, 2023 6	Greenville Triumph	1–2	North Carolina FC	Greenville, South Carolina
7:00 PM EDT	Wu 90+4'		Perez 19'; Mentzingen 37' (pen.)	Stadium: Paladin Stadium; Attendance: 3,228; Referee: Joshua Encarnación

May 5, 2023 7	Fuego FC	0–2	North Carolina FC	Fresno, California
10:00 PM EDT		Report	Mentzingen 32'; Perez 60'	Stadium: Fresno State Soccer Stadium; Attendance: 775; Referee: Ricardo Fierro

May 13, 2023 8	North Carolina FC	0–2	Forward Madison	Cary, North Carolina
7:00 PM EDT		Report	Martinez 14'; Osmond 68'	Stadium: WakeMed Soccer Park; Attendance: 2,610; Referee: Abdou Ndiaye

May 17, 2023 9	North Carolina FC	3–2	Richmond Kickers	Cary, North Carolina
7:00 PM EDT	Anderson 62'; Perez 73'; McLaughlin 76'	Report	Da Silva 29', 32'	Stadium: WakeMed Soccer Park; Attendance: 1,377; Referee: José Carlos Rivero

May 21, 2023 10	Charlotte Independence	2–1	North Carolina FC	Charlotte, North Carolina
2:00 PM EDT	Mbuyu 61'; Bennett 81'	Report	Anderson 47'	Stadium: American Legion Memorial Stadium; Attendance: 3,672; Referee: Servando Berna Rico

June 3, 2023 11	One Knoxville SC	0–1	North Carolina FC	Knoxville, Tennessee
7:30 PM EDT		Report	Servania 45+1'	Stadium: Regal Stadium; Attendance: 2,422; Referee: Michael O'Reilly

June 10, 2023 12	Forward Madison	3–0	North Carolina FC	Madison, Wisconsin
8:00 PM EDT	Payne 44'; Prentice 64'; Crull 75'	Report		Stadium: Breese Stevens Field; Attendance: 4,567; Referee: Matt Geringer

June 18, 2023 13	North Carolina FC	2–2	Lexington SC	Cary, North Carolina
3:00 PM EDT	Perez 50'; McLaughlin 54'	Report	Baynham 31'; Robertson 81'	Stadium: WakeMed Soccer Park; Attendance: 1,682; Referee: Cristian Campo Hernández

June 30, 2023 14	North Carolina FC	2–0	Charlotte Independence	Cary, North Carolina
7:00 PM EST	Anderson 40', 59'	Report		Stadium: WakeMed Soccer Park; Attendance: 2,396; Referee: Joe Surgan

July 8, 2023 15	One Knoxville SC	2–2	North Carolina FC	Knoxville, Tennessee
7:30 PM EDT	Crisler 31'; Ross 36'	Report	Anderson 4'; McLaughlin 60'	Stadium: Regal Stadium; Attendance: 2,109; Referee: Muhammad Hassan

July 15, 2023 16	North Carolina FC	2–2	Forward Madison	Cary, North Carolina
7:00 PM EDT	Anderson 67', 90+3'	Report	Gebhard 16'; Bartman 37'	Stadium: WakeMed Soccer Park; Attendance: 1,875; Referee: Michael O'Reilly

July 26, 2023 17	North Carolina FC	2–0	Hailstorm FC	Cary, North Carolina
7:00 PM EDT	Perez 45'; Anderson 90+5'	Report		Stadium: WakeMed Soccer Park; Attendance: 1,354; Referee: Shawn Tehini

July 29, 2023 18	Chattanooga Red Wolves	1–2	North Carolina FC	East Ridge, Tennessee
7:30 PM EDT	Hernandez 83'	Report	Sommersall 33'; Mentzingen 39'	Stadium: CHI Memorial Stadium; Attendance: 2,717; Referee: Madzid Coric

August 5, 2023 19	Tormenta FC	2–3	North Carolina FC	Statesboro, Georgia
7:30 PM EDT	Adjei 13'; Sterling 39'	Report	Mentzingen 35' (pen.), 42' (pen.); Anderson 76'	Stadium: Optim Health Systems Field; Attendance: 2,041; Referee: Donovan Eubank

August 9, 2023 20	Richmond Kickers	2–2	North Carolina FC	Richmond, Virginia
7:00 PM EDT	Terzaghi 33'; Hornsby 90+6'	Report	McLaughlin 36'; Hornsby 90+6' (o.g.)	Stadium: City Stadium; Attendance: 3,143; Referee: Gary Gutiérrez

August 12, 2023 21	North Carolina FC	2–1	Greenville Triumph	Cary, North Carolina
7:00 PM EDT	McLaughlin 54'; Perez 56'	Report	MacKinnon 36'	Stadium: WakeMed Soccer Park; Attendance: 2,301; Referee: Cristian Campo

August 19, 2023 22	Richmond Kickers	1–3	North Carolina FC	Richmond, Virginia
7:00 PM EDT	Fitch 86'	Report	Anderson 16', 53'; Maldonado 81'	Stadium: City Stadium; Attendance: 5,570; Referee: Gabriele Ciampi

August 26, 2023 23	North Carolina FC	1–2	Hailstorm FC	Cary, North Carolina
7:00 PM EDT	Garcia 52'	Report	Amann 27'; Rendón 64'	Stadium: WakeMed Soccer Park; Attendance: 2,343; Referee: Olvin Oliva

September 2, 2023 24	North Carolina FC	2–1	Fuego FC	Cary, North Carolina
4:00 PM EDT	Servania 36'; Benton 89'	Report	Cerritos 4' (pen.)	Stadium: WakeMed Soccer Park; Attendance: 2,142; Referee: Velimir Stefanovic

September 6, 2023 25	Union Omaha	4–3	North Carolina FC	Papillion, Nebraska
8:00 PM EDT	Dolabella 9'; Brito 45+2'; Duba 59'; Meza 75'	Report	McLaughlin 11'; Mentzingen 85'; Popp 90+4'	Stadium: Werner Park; Attendance: 2,648; Referee: Joe Surgan

September 9, 2023 26	Greenville Triumph	0–2	North Carolina FC	Greenville, South Carolina
7:00 PM EDT		Report	Mentzingen 11' (pen.); Servania 23'	Stadium: Paladin Stadium; Attendance: 1,524; Referee: John Rush

September 16, 2023 27	North Carolina FC	2–3	Tormenta FC	Cary, North Carolina
7:00 PM EDT	Sommersall 49'; Anderson 60'	Report	Akale 21'; Khoury 82'; Adjei 90+4'	Stadium: WakeMed Soccer Park; Attendance: 2,952; Referee: Aleksandar Zhelyazkov

September 20, 2023 28	Fuego FC	0–3	North Carolina FC	Fresno, California
10:30 PM EDT		Report	Anderson 28'; McLaughlin 74'; Mentzingen 81' (pen.)	Stadium: Fresno State Soccer Stadium; Attendance: 582; Referee: Olvin Oliva

September 23, 2023 29	Hailstorm FC	0–2	North Carolina FC	Windsor, Colorado
9:00 PM EDT		Report	McLaughlin 40'; Anderson 58'	Stadium: Future Legends Complex; Attendance: 2,119; Referee: Cristian Campo

September 29, 2023 30	North Carolina FC	1–1	Union Omaha	Cary, North Carolina
7:00 PM EDT	Mentzingen 12'		Gil 40'	Stadium: WakeMed Soccer Park; Attendance: 3,664; Referee: Gary Gutiérrez

October 7, 2023 31	Lexington SC	0–1	North Carolina FC	Georgetown, Kentucky
7:00 PM EDT			Anderson 29'	Stadium: Toyota Stadium; Attendance: 2,181; Referee: Richonne Clark

October 14, 2023 32	North Carolina FC	2–1	One Knoxville SC	Cary, North Carolina
7:00 PM EDT	Fernandes 30'; McLaughlin 89'	Report	Ross 55'	Stadium: WakeMed Soccer Park; Attendance: 5,795; Referee: Arnel Selman

==== Playoffs ====
October 28, 2023 Semi-final	North Carolina FC	3–1	Hailstorm FC	Cary, North Carolina
7:30 PM EDT	Blanco (yellow card) 15'; Garcia 31', 49'; Perez (yellow card) 85' (goal) 87'	Report	Folla (yellow card) 22'; Rendón (yellow card) 56'; Hernández 90+4'	Stadium: WakeMed Soccer Park; Attendance: 2,345; Referee: Alexis Da Silva

November 5, 2023 Final	North Carolina FC	1–1 (a.e.t.) (5–4 p)	Charlotte Independence	Cary, North Carolina
5:00 PM EDT	Perez (yellow card) 86'; Ntalu (yellow card) 108'; Pack 111' (o.g.)	Report	Flanagan (yellow card) 71'; Mbuyu (yellow card) 88'; Acosta 99'	Stadium: WakeMed Soccer Park; Attendance: 4,487; Referee: Sergii Demianchuk
	Penalties
	Perez (penalty scored); Servania (penalty scored); Navarro (penalty scored); Maldonado (penalty scored); Arriaga (penalty scored)		(penalty scored) Kelly; (penalty missed) Johnson; (penalty scored) Acosta; (penalty scored) Álvarez; (penalty scored) Spielman

=== U.S. Open Cup ===
April 5, 2023 2nd Round	North Carolina FC	1–2 (a.e.t.)	(Virginia) Loudoun United FC	Leesburg, Virginia
7:00 PM EDT	Servania 67'	Report	Ryan 7'; Leggett 116'	Stadium: Segra Field; Referee: Kenneth Rojas
