= Alex Knox =

American soccer player

Personal information
- Full name: Alexander John Knox
- Date of birth: June 21, 1997 (age 29)
- Place of birth: Indianapolis, Indiana, United States
- Height: 1.80 m (5 ft 11 in)
- Position: Defender

Youth career
- Real Salt Lake

College career
Years	Team	Apps	(Gls)
2016	Wake Forest Demon Deacons	19	(0)
2017–2019	UCLA Bruins	36	(2)

Senior career*
Years	Team	Apps	(Gls)
2021	FC Tucson	21	(0)
Total		21	(0)
- * Club domestic league appearances and goals

Alexander John Knox (born June 21, 1997) is an American former soccer player. During his career, he played as a defender for FC Tucson in USL League One.

== Career ==
=== Collegiate ===
Knox began his collegiate career at Wake Forest University, starting 19 of 25 games and tallying one assist in his freshman season. He then transferred to UCLA, scoring his first collegiate goal as part of a brace against Oregon State. At the end of his junior season, Knox was named amongst the honorable mentions to the Pac-12 All-Academic Team.

=== Professional ===
After his collegiate career came to a close, Knox funded a trip to Italy, where he was set to meet with Serie A scouts in hopes of being offered a contract. However, Knox arrived shortly before the COVID-19 pandemic began to emerge in the country, forcing him back to the United States without an offer from a professional outfit. However, Knox would kickstart his professional career in early 2021, reuniting with former youth coach John Galas at FC Tucson. He made his debut for the club on May 16, 2021, coming on as a 78th-minute substitute for Deri Corfe in a 5–1 defeat to Fort Lauderdale.

== Career statistics ==
=== Club ===
Appearances and goals by club, season and competition
Club	Season	League			Cup		Other		Total	
Club	Season	Division	Apps	Goals	Apps	Goals	Apps	Goals	Apps	Goals
FC Tucson	2021	USL League One	21	0	—	—	2 (Note: Appearances in the USL League One playoffs)	0	23	0
Career total			21	0	—	—	2	0	23	0
