= Uxbridge High School =

Uxbridge High School can refer to:

- Uxbridge High School (London), Uxbridge, West London, England
- Uxbridge High School (Massachusetts), Uxbridge, Massachusetts, United States
