= Kevin Rodriguez (soccer, born 1996) =

American soccer player

Personal information
- Date of birth: September 25, 1996 (age 30)
- Place of birth: Pasadena, Texas, United States
- Height: 5 ft 8 in (1.73 m)
- Position: Winger

Youth career
- Manchester United Houston
- 2014–2015: Houston Dynamo

College career
| Years | Team | Apps | (Gls) |
| 2015–2018 | Northern Illinois Huskies | 59 | (7) |

Senior career*
| Years | Team | Apps | (Gls) |
| 2017–2018 | Brazos Valley Cavalry | 5 | (0) |
| 2019–2020 | Rio Grande Valley FC | 30 | (2) |
| 2021–2022 | FC Tucson | 18 | (3) |
- * Club domestic league appearances and goals as of June 4, 2022

Kevin Rodriguez (born September 25, 1996) is an American soccer player who plays as a midfielder.

== Early life ==
He played youth soccer with Manchester United Houston. After originally getting cut by the Houston Dynamo academy twice, he eventually was accepted to join the academy in 2014.

== College career ==
In 2015, he began attending Northern Illinois University, where he played for the men's soccer team. He scored his first collegiate goal on September 29, 2015, against the Eastern Illinois Panthers. As a freshman, he was named the 2015 MAC Freshman of the Year, and was named to the NIU Adidas Invitational All-Tournament Team. In his senior season in 2018, he was named to the United Soccer Coaches All-North Region Third Team and the All-MAC First Team.

== Club career ==
In 2017, Rodriguez joined USL Premier Development League side Brazos Valley Cavalry during the college offseason. He made two appearances in 2017 and three appearances in 2018.

In January 2019, Rodriguez was selected 75th overall in the 2019 MLS SuperDraft by Minnesota United, becoming the first Northern Illinois University player to ever be drafted.

In March 2019, Rodriguez signed for USL Championship side Rio Grande Valley FC. He scored his first professional goal on August 10, 2019, against the Colorado Springs Switchbacks.

Rodriguez signed with FC Tucson in USL League One on February 10, 2021. After struggling with injuries early in the 2021 season, he scored his first goal for the club on October 16, 2021, when he scored two goals against South Georgia Tormenta FC in a 3–1 victory. As a result of that performance, he was named to the USL Team of the Week.

== Career statistics ==
As of June 4, 2022

| Club | Season | League | | | Playoffs | | Domestic Cup | | Continental | | Total | |
| Club | Season | Division | Apps | Goals | Apps | Goals | Apps | Goals | Apps | Goals | Apps | Goals |
|---|---|---|---|---|---|---|---|---|---|---|---|---|
| Brazos Valley Cavalry | 2017 | Premier Development League | 2 | 0 | – | | – | | – | | 2 | 0 |
| Brazos Valley Cavalry | 2018 | Premier Development League | 3 | 0 | 0 | 0 | – | | – | | 3 | 0 |
| Brazos Valley Cavalry | Total | | 5 | 0 | 0 | 0 | 0 | 0 | 0 | 0 | 5 | 0 |
| Rio Grande Valley FC | 2019 | USL Championship | 22 | 2 | – | | – | | – | | 22 | 2 |
| Rio Grande Valley FC | 2020 | USL Championship | 8 | 0 | – | | – | | – | | 8 | 0 |
| Rio Grande Valley FC | Total | | 30 | 0 | 0 | 0 | 0 | 0 | 0 | 0 | 30 | 2 |
| FC Tucson | 2021 | USL League One | 17 | 3 | 2 | 0 | – | | – | | 19 | 3 |
| FC Tucson | 2022 | USL League One | 1 | 0 | – | | 0 | 0 | – | | 1 | 0 |
| FC Tucson | Total | | 18 | 3 | 2 | 0 | 0 | 0 | 0 | 0 | 20 | 3 |
| Career total | | | 53 | 3 | 2 | 0 | 0 | 0 | 0 | 0 | 55 | 5 |
