= Uxbridge High School, London =

Uxbridge High School

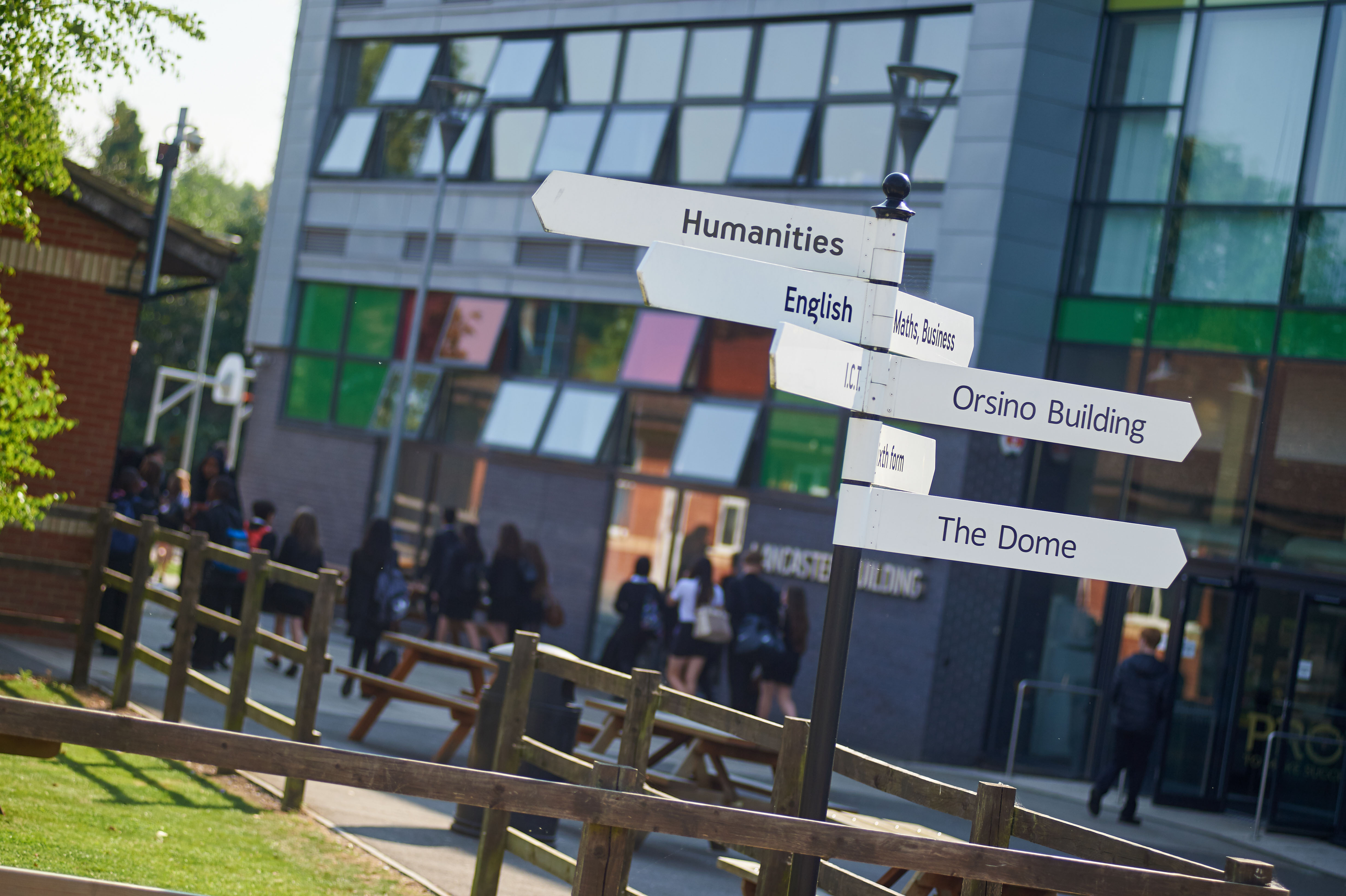
- Lancaster Building and new building

Location
- The Greenway; Hillingdon, London, UB8 2PR; England
- Coordinates: 51.5367°N 0.4741°W

Information
- Type: Converter Academy
- Motto: Proud to make success happen
- Established: 1809; 217 years ago
- Local authority: Hillingdon
- Department for Education URN: 136768 Tables
- Ofsted: Reports
- Chair of Trustees: Kieran Bassan
- Principal: Louisa Seymour
- Gender: Mixed
- Age: 11 to 18
- Houses: Brunel, Cambridge, Imperial, Oxford and Warwick
- Website: Official website

Uxbridge High School is a mixed secondary school with academy status in west London in the town of Uxbridge.

== Summary ==
Ofsted inspected the school on 28 February 2018 and graded the overall effectiveness of the school as good.

The school has close links with the RSC (Royal Shakespeare Company) and TeachFirst, being one of its first partner schools.

The current principal, Louisa Seymour, started in September 2022 after being promoted from Vice Principal. Prior to her, Nigel Clemens was principal who moved on after 36 years of service with the school. He was formerly Senior Vice Principal, who took over the post of Principal at short notice in May 2014 after Peter Lang had left. As of 2024 there is a new uniform

== History ==
Since 1907, the current Greenway site was occupied by the Uxbridge County School, until it moved to the house in Royal Lane where it took its new name Bishopshalt Grammar School. The Greenway premises were subsequently occupied by the Uxbridge Senior Elementary School, later to become Greenway School. The original building, still remains on site as the 'Old Building' (pictured on the right)

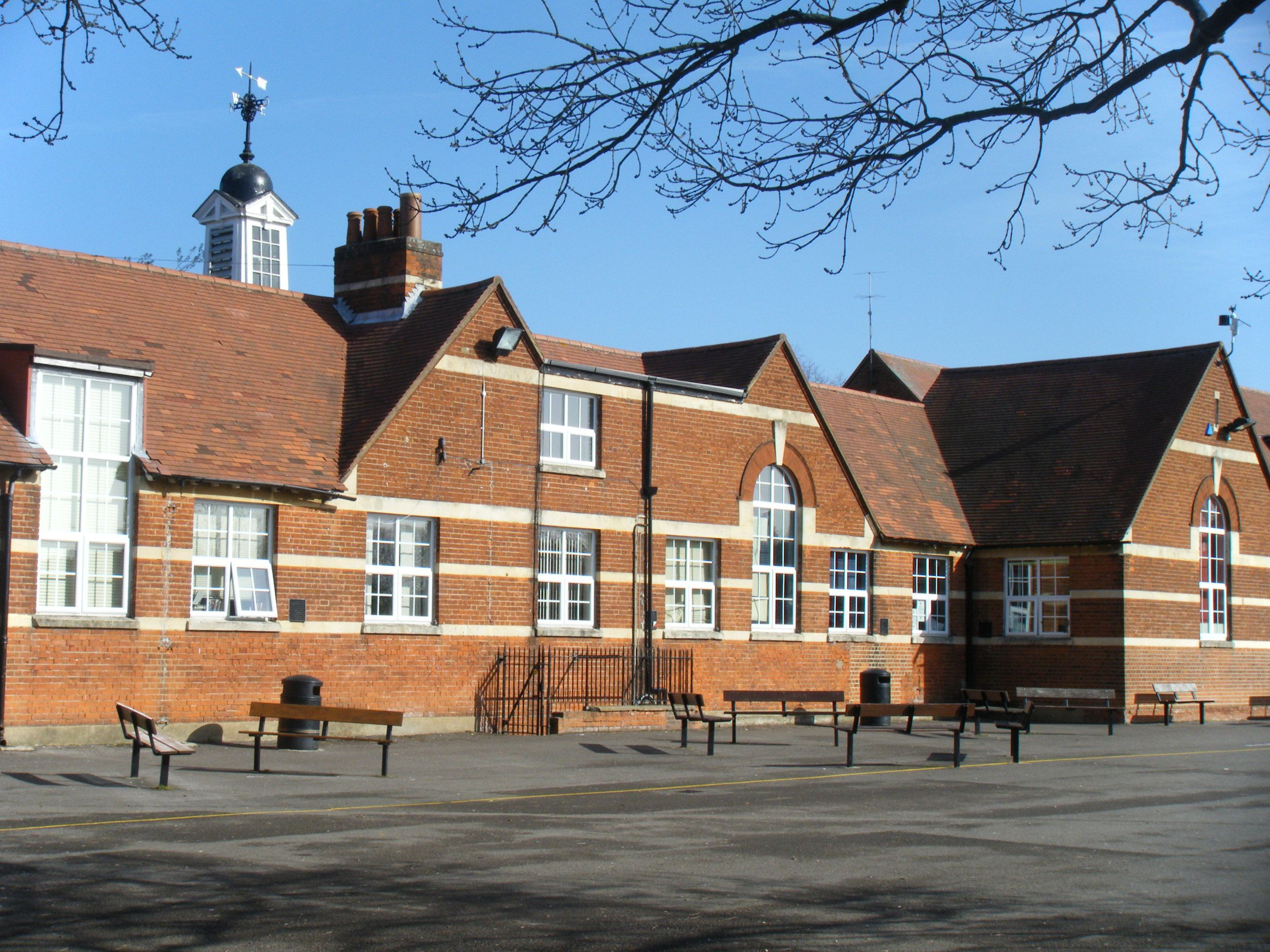
The Old Building, a borough Listed building

In 1968–69, the school had a rebuild to add new classrooms, the current Science building.

In 1991, the school was renamed to its current name.

The school was one of the first few to partner with charity Teach First. To celebrate the charity's 10th anniversary, their patron Charles, Prince of Wales (current King) and Camilla, Duchess of Cornwall, visited the school on 22 February 2012. Students led a traditional Indian dhol drum performance and an urban adaptation of Romeo and Juliet, with the Prince attending a maths lesson and Duchess a literary class. A plaque was also unveiled to commemorate the 10-year partnership between the school and the charity.

The Lancaster building was completed in May 2009, costing £6 million and housing a sixth form centre. It was named after Joseph Lancaster in recognition of his influence on education in the local area.

In 2013/14, the Dome, opened with Brentford FC, was built: a fully enclosed 60m by 50m pitch with Third Generation artificial turf. The building also has learning zones, changing rooms, a gym and a physio room.

In 2014, the school opened a new £2.5 million state of the art drama and music facility. The new Orsino building's name references the character of Orsino from Shakespeare's Twelfth Night.

In 2015, then-Mayor of London and MP for Uxbridge and South Ruislip Boris Johnson visited the school.

== House System ==
Uxbridge High School currently has five house groups:

- Brunel - Green
- Cambridge - Purple
- Imperial - Red
- Oxford - Silver
- Warwick - Blue

House groups are a method of pastoral care, with siblings being placed in the same house to ensure consistency in safeguarding. Each house has a dedicated Head of House and a non-teaching Guidance Leader to support the students full-time.

Before 2022, the house system was as follows:

- Lancaster - Green
- Stuart - Purple
- Tudor - Red
- Windsor - Silver
- York - Blue

Before 2010, the house system was as follows:

- Brunel - Yellow
- Cambridge - Blue
- Thames - Green
- Harvard - Red

=== Design History ===
Up until 2011, the school used the following logo:

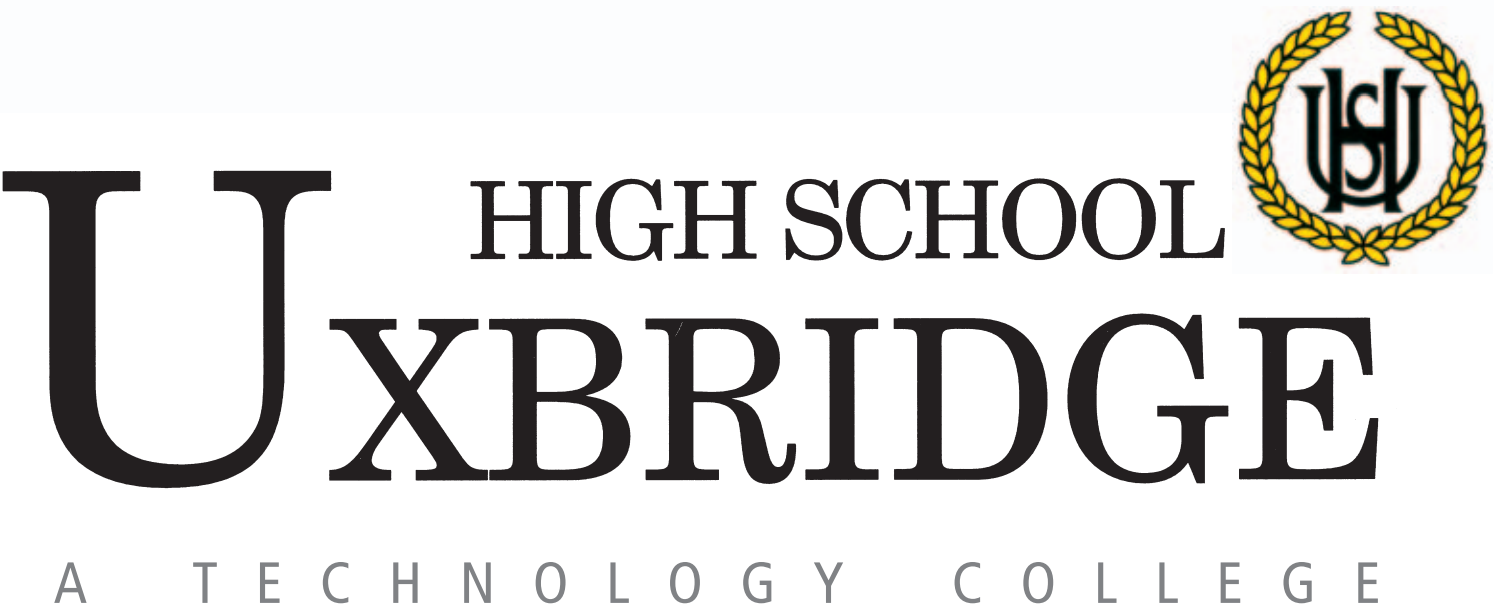

It rebranded in 2011 to the following:

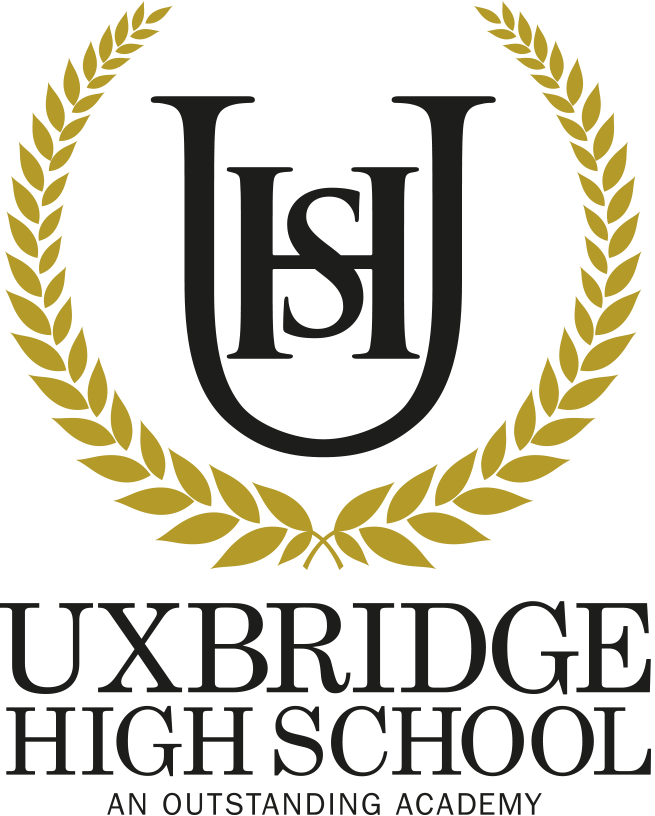

In 2022, a change to the typeface and Navy colour was added:

== Notable former students ==
- Jaden Philogene, footballer
- Showkat Tahir, footballer
