= Noah Franke =

American soccer player

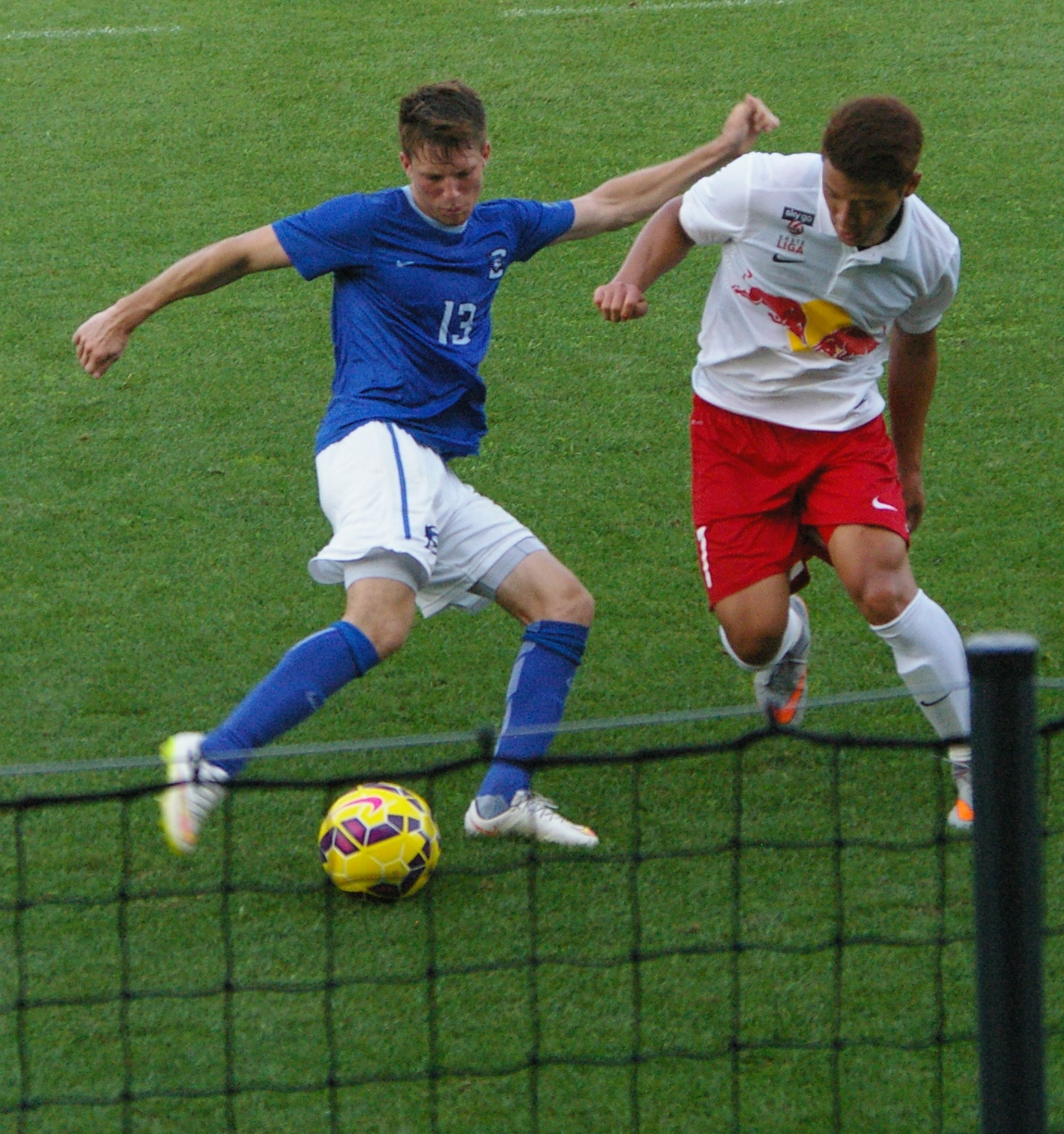
- Noah Franke attempted to dribble past Hwang Hee-chan during a match between Creighton Bluejays and Red Bull Salzburg in 2015.

Personal information
- Date of birth: March 25, 1995 (age 31)
- Place of birth: Orlando, Florida, United States
- Height: 5 ft 8 in (1.73 m)
- Positions: Defender; midfielder

Youth career
- 2013–2014: Orlando City

College career
Years	Team	Apps	(Gls)
2014–2017	Creighton Bluejays	71	(4)

Senior career*
Years	Team	Apps	(Gls)
2014–2015	Orlando City U-23	21	(1)
2017	Tampa Bay Rowdies U23	9	(0)
2018–2019	Pittsburgh Riverhounds	25	(0)
2021	FC Tucson	26	(0)
2022–2023	Greenville Triumph	27	(1)
- * Club domestic league appearances and goals as of October 16, 2023

Noah Franke (born March 25, 1995) is an American soccer player.

== Career ==
=== College ===
Franke spent his entire college career at Creighton University between 2014 and 2017, where he made 85 appearances, starting 57 games, scoring 6 goals and tallying 14 assists in his time with the Bluejays.

During his time at college, Franke played with Premier Development League sides Orlando City U-23 and Tampa Bay Rowdies U23.

=== Professional ===
Franke was selected in the fourth round (80th overall) of the 2018 MLS SuperDraft by FC Dallas. However, he was not signed by the club.

On March 28, 2018, Franke signed for USL side Pittsburgh Riverhounds SC.

On April 15, 2021, Franke joined USL League One club FC Tucson ahead of the 2021 season.

Franke signed with Greenville Triumph SC on January 21, 2022.
