= Haroun Conteh =

American soccer player

Personal information
- Date of birth: January 20, 2005 (age 21)
- Place of birth: Freetown, Sierra Leone
- Height: 6 ft 1 in (1.85 m)
- Position: Defender

Team information
- Current team: California Baptist
- Number: 4

Youth career
- 2018–2019: Phoenix Rising
- 2019–2021: Real Salt Lake Academy
- 2022: North Carolina FC Academy
- 2023: FC Cincinnati Academy

College career
Years	Team	Apps	(Gls)
2024	Southern New Hampshire University	18	(0)
2025–	California Baptist University	17	(1)

Senior career*
Years	Team	Apps	(Gls)
2021	Real Monarchs	12	(0)
2022	North Carolina FC U23	7	(0)
2023	FC Cincinnati 2	19	(0)
- * Club domestic league appearances and goals

Haroun Conteh (born January 20, 2005) is an American association football player who plays as a defender for the California Baptist Lancers men's soccer team. Born in Freetown, Sierra Leone, Conteh grew up in Glendale, Arizona. He has played for the Real Monarchs, North Carolina FC U23 and FC Cincinnati 2, and has competed in the USL Championship, USL League Two and MLS NEXT Pro.

== Early life and youth career ==
Conteh was born in Freetown, Sierra Leone, and grew up in Glendale, Arizona. He played youth soccer with Phoenix Rising before joining the Real Salt Lake Academy in 2019.

In 2019, Conteh was selected for the U.S. Club Soccer id2 National Selection international tour in Belgium and France. He was one of 18 players born in 2005 selected for the tour and was listed as a defender from Glendale, Arizona, representing Phoenix Rising.

Conteh later played in the Real Salt Lake Academy system. In 2021, he was listed among the academy players appearing for the Real Monarchs, the club's USL Championship side.

== Professional career ==
=== Real Monarchs ===
Conteh made his professional debut for the Real Monarchs on June 23, 2021, at the age of 16. He started at center back in a 1–1 draw away to Tacoma Defiance.

Conteh made 12 appearances for the Monarchs during the 2021 USL Championship season, playing 560 minutes without scoring or recording an assist. On September 18, he started in a 2–1 loss to New Mexico United before being substituted in the 60th minute. On September 29, he started against El Paso Locomotive FC and had a shot saved in the 58th minute.

=== North Carolina FC ===
In 2022, Conteh joined North Carolina FC from the Real Salt Lake Academy. On April 6, North Carolina FC announced that he had signed an academy contract that allowed him to train and play in first-team matches while maintaining his college eligibility. The club described Conteh as the first participant in its Youth Homestay Program to sign an amateur contract with the first team.

Conteh played for North Carolina FC U23 in the USL League Two during the 2022 season. He made seven appearances and played 455 minutes, recording no goals or assists.

=== FC Cincinnati 2 ===
Conteh joined the FC Cincinnati organization and played for FC Cincinnati 2 in MLS NEXT Pro during the 2023 season. He made his FC Cincinnati 2 debut on March 27, 2023, against Toronto FC II, entering as a second-half substitute.

On April 23, Conteh made his first start for FC Cincinnati 2 in a 3–2 victory over Sporting Kansas City II. He started at defender, and the club's match report identified him as an FC Cincinnati Academy defender.

Conteh made 19 appearances for FC Cincinnati 2 in the 2023 MLS NEXT Pro regular season, including five starts, and played 589 minutes without scoring.

== College career ==
=== Southern New Hampshire ===
Conteh enrolled at Southern New Hampshire University in 2024 and joined the Penmen men's soccer team. He entered the program as a freshman defender from Glendale, Arizona, and was listed as a business administration major.

Conteh played 18 matches for Southern New Hampshire during the 2024 season. He was a regular starter as the Penmen won the Northeast-10 Conference regular-season and tournament championships and advanced to the NCAA Division II men's soccer tournament.

He was named NE10 Rookie of the Week on October 14, 2024, and was selected to the NE10 All-Conference First Team and All-Rookie Team. He was also named to the Division II Conference Commissioners Association East All-Region First Team.

=== California Baptist ===
Conteh transferred to California Baptist University for the 2025 season. He started 16 of his 17 matches and played 1,383 minutes according to the university's player profile. He scored one goal and recorded one assist.

The university's 2025 season release records Conteh as appearing in all 16 matches during the regular season, making 15 starts and playing 1,290 minutes. He scored his only goal of the season in a 3–0 shutout of Air Force.

Conteh was named to the Western Athletic Conference All-WAC First Team following the 2025 season.

Conteh remained at California Baptist for the 2026 season and was listed on the Lancers' roster as a junior defender.

== Career statistics ==
=== Club ===
Appearances and goals by club and season
Season	Club	Competition	Apps	Goals
2021	Real Monarchs	USL Championship	12	0
2022	North Carolina FC U23	USL League Two	7	0
2023	FC Cincinnati 2	MLS NEXT Pro	19	0

=== College ===
Season	Team	Apps	Starts	Goals	Assists
2024	Southern New Hampshire University	18	18	0	0
2025	California Baptist University	17	16	1	1

== Honors ==
Southern New Hampshire University

- Northeast-10 Conference All-Conference First Team: 2024
- Northeast-10 All-Rookie Team: 2024
- D2CCA East All-Region First Team: 2024
- NE10 Rookie of the Week: October 14, 2024

California Baptist University

- Western Athletic Conference All-WAC First Team: 2025
