= Showkat Tahir =

English footballer (born 2001)

Personal information
- Full name: Showkat Ali Tahir
- Date of birth: 3 May 2001 (age 25)
- Place of birth: London, England
- Height: 1.70 m (5 ft 7 in)
- Position: Forward

Youth career
- Chettle Court Rangers
- –2016: Brentford
- 2016–2019: Fulham
- 2019–2020: Cheshunt

Senior career*
Years	Team	Apps	(Gls)
2019	Cheshunt	0	(0)
2021	Chesham United	1	(0)
2022	North Carolina FC	20	(2)
2024	Hilltop	3	(0)
2024	Arlesey Town	3	(0)

International career
2017	England U16	1	(0)
- * Club domestic league appearances and goals as of 18:57, 22 August 2026 (UTC)

Showkat Ali Tahir (born 3 May 2001) is an English professional footballer who plays as a forward.

Tahir is a product of the Brentford and Fulham academies and played a season as a professional for USL League One club North Carolina FC. He resumed his career in non-League football in 2024.

== Club career ==
=== Early years ===
As a forward, Tahir began his youth career with Chettle Court Rangers and the Brentford and Fulham academies. He progressed with the latter club to sign a two-year scholarship deal in July 2017. After his release by Fulham at the end of the 2019–20 season, Tahir had a spell with Amateur Combination club Wood Green Old Boys. He moved up into non-League football to join Isthmian League Premier Division club Cheshunt in December 2019, for whom he was an unused substitute on one occasion during the remainder of the 2019–20 season. Following a trial with Hayes & Yeading United, Tahir joined Southern League Premier Division Central club Chesham United in August 2021. He made four appearances and scored one goal prior to his departure midway through the 2021–22 season.

=== North Carolina FC ===
On 7 December 2021, it was announced that Tahir had signed one-year contract with USL League One club North Carolina FC. He made 20 appearances and scored two goals during a 2022 season which culminated in a bottom place finish.

=== Non-League football ===
In August 2024, Tahir began making appearances for Combined Counties League Premier Division North club Hilltop. He transferred to Spartan South Midlands League Premier Division club Arlesey Town in mid-October 2024.

== International career ==
Tahir was capped once by England at U16 level, in a 4–0 UEFA Development Tournament win over Finland on 15 February 2017.

== Personal life ==
Tahir attended Uxbridge High School.

== Career statistics ==
As of match played 23 November 2024

Appearances and goals by club, season and competition
Club	Season	League			National cup (Note: Includes FA Cup)		Other		Total	
Club	Season	Division	Apps	Goals	Apps	Goals	Apps	Goals	Apps	Goals
Cheshunt	2019–20	Isthmian League Premier Division	0	0	—		0	0	0	0
Chesham United	2021–22	Southern League Premier Division Central	1	0	2	0	1 (Note: Appearance in Southern League Cup)	1	4	1
North Carolina FC	2022	USL League One	20	2	—		—		20	2
Hilltop	2024–25	Combined Counties League Premier Division North	3	0	—		1 (Note: Appearance in Combined Counties League Premier Challenge Cup)	1	4	1
Arlesey Town	2024–25	Spartan South Midlands League Premier Division	3	0	—		3 (Note: 1 appearance in FA Vase, 1 appearance in Bedfordshire Senior Cup, 1 appearance and 1 goal in Spartan South Midlands League Cup)	1	6	1
Career total			27	2	2	0	5	3	34	5
