= Samuel Terranova =

American soccer player (born 2004)

Personal information
- Full name: Samuel Pierce Terranova
- Date of birth: March 28, 2004 (age 22)
- Height: 6 ft 1 in (1.85 m)
- Position: Goalkeeper

Team information
- Current team: NC State
- Number: 1

College career
Years	Team	Apps	(Gls)
2023–	NC State University	11	(0)

Senior career*
Years	Team	Apps	(Gls)
2021–2022	North Carolina FC	0	(0)
2021–2022	North Carolina FC U23	8	(0)
- * Club domestic league appearances and goals

Samuel Terranova (born March 28, 2004) is an American association football player who plays as a goalkeeper for the NC State Wolfpack. He played youth soccer for North Carolina FC for seven years and was twice signed to amateur contracts with the club's first team while retaining his college eligibility. He later played for North Carolina FC U23 in USL League Two before beginning his college career at NC State in 2023.

== Early life and youth career ==
Terranova is from Fayetteville, North Carolina, and attended Terry Sanford High School. He joined the North Carolina FC Academy as a youth player and remained with the academy for several years. North Carolina FC described him in 2021 as a high-school junior who had been a member of the academy for five years.

Terranova was selected for Team North Carolina at the ICC Futures Tournament. He was also a member of the North Carolina FC U23 setup during the USL League Two period of his youth career.

== North Carolina FC ==
In March 2021, Terranova was one of 15 NCFC Academy players signed by North Carolina FC to academy contracts. The agreements allowed the young players to train with and play for the professional first team while maintaining their college eligibility.

Terranova was also listed on North Carolina FC U23's 2021 USL League Two roster. He made five appearances during the 2021 regular season, playing 182 minutes.

In April 2022, Terranova signed a second amateur contract with North Carolina FC. The club said he had been part of the NCFC Academy for six years, that he had committed to play collegiately at NC State, and that the contract was his second with the first team. Terranova said he had been with the club since age 12 and had played goalkeeper for NCFC at the US Development Academy, Elite Clubs National League, USL Academy and USL League Two levels.

During the 2022 USL League Two season, Terranova made three appearances for North Carolina FC U23, all starts, and played 270 minutes. He conceded six goals and made 12 saves.

Terranova was also included on North Carolina FC's 2022 USL League One roster through his amateur agreement. He did not make a USL League One appearance during the season.

== College career ==
=== NC State ===
Terranova joined NC State University for the 2023 season. He was part of an incoming class of 14 players announced by the university in August 2023 and entered the program as a goalkeeper from Fayetteville.

In his freshman season, Terranova appeared in and started five matches, playing 450 minutes. He led the team with 27 saves. On October 13, 2023, he made a career-high eight saves in a match against Duke.

Terranova also started against High Point on October 17, recording four saves in a 0–0 draw. On October 22, he played the first half in a 1–1 draw against Syracuse, recording a shutout during his 45 minutes in goal.

Terranova did not appear in any matches during the 2024 season.

In 2025, Terranova played in three matches for NC State, averaging 23 minutes per appearance. He made two saves in the team's September match against William & Mary.

Terranova returned for the 2026 season as a senior goalkeeper. He started NC State's August 20 season opener against Coastal Carolina, helping the Wolfpack record a 0–0 shutout. He also started the August 27 match against FIU. Through four matches of the 2026 season, he had started twice and played 180 minutes.

== Career statistics ==
=== Club ===
USL League Two statistics
Season	Club	Apps	Minutes	Goals	Assists
2021	North Carolina FC U23	5	182	0	0
2022	North Carolina FC U23	3	270	0	0
Total		8	452	0	0

Sources: USL League Two.

=== College ===
Season	Team	Apps	Starts	Minutes	Saves
2023	NC State University	5	5	450	27
2024	NC State University	0	0	0	0
2025	NC State University	3	0	69	2
2026	NC State University	2	2	180	
Total		10	7	699	

2023 and 2025 statistics are from NC State University Athletics; 2026 statistics are current through August 30, 2026.

== Personal life ==
Terranova was a member of the National Honor Society while in school. His father is the head men's soccer coach at Methodist University.
