= Jaden Servania =

Puerto Rican footballer (born 2001)

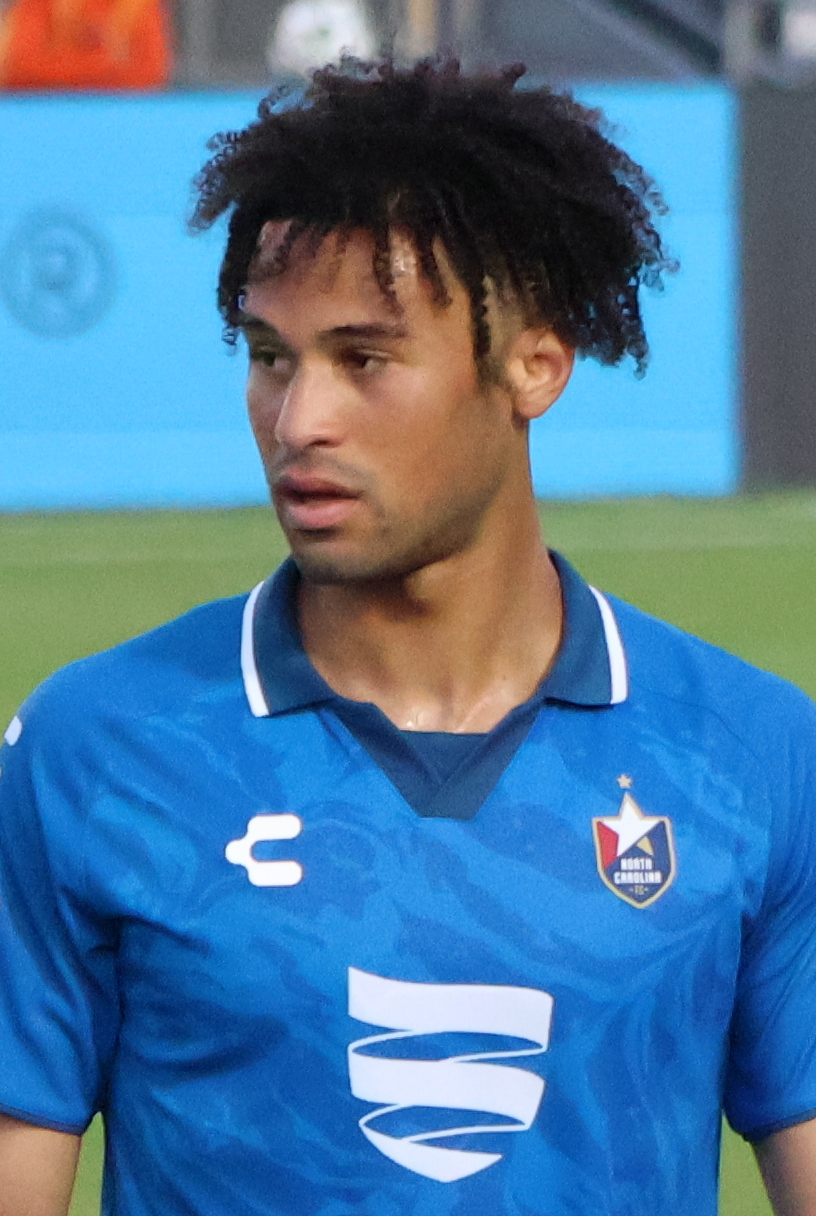
- Servania with North Carolina FC in 2025

Personal information
- Full name: Jaden Enrique Servania
- Date of birth: July 16, 2001 (age 25)
- Place of birth: Birmingham, Alabama, U.S.
- Height: 5 ft 10 in (1.78 m)
- Position: Midfielder

Team information
- Current team: Brooklyn FC
- Number: 11

Youth career
- 2015–2017: FC Dallas
- 2017–2019: Houston Dynamo

Senior career*
Years	Team	Apps	(Gls)
2019	Brazos Valley Cavalry	0	(0)
2020–2021	Birmingham Legion	44	(3)
2022–2025	North Carolina FC	102	(8)
2026-	Brooklyn FC	23	(1)

International career^{‡}
2018	Puerto Rico U20	5	(7)
2021–	Puerto Rico	30	(2)
- * Club domestic league appearances and goals as of 4 November 2026 ‡ National team caps and goals as of 29 September 2026

Jaden Enrique Servania (born July 16, 2001) is a professional footballer who plays as a midfielder for USL Championship club Brooklyn FC. Born in the United States, he plays for the Puerto Rico national team.

== Career ==
=== Youth ===
Servania moved from his native Alabama to join the FC Dallas academy in 2015, where he played before later moving again to Houston Dynamo in 2017.

Servania played with USL League Two side Brazos Valley Cavalry, an affiliate of Houston Dynamo, in 2019. He made his sole appearance for the club during a Lamar Hunt US Open Cup game against Laredo Heat on May 8, 2019.

=== Professional ===
On February 6, 2020, Servania signed a USL Academy contract with USL Championship side Birmingham Legion, which would keep him eligible to play college soccer at a later time. He made his debut on July 15, 2020, starting in a 3–0 win over Memphis 901.

Servania signed with North Carolina FC of USL League One on January 21, 2022.

On February 18, 2026, Brooklyn FC announced they had signed Servania to a contract for the 2026 USL Championship season.

=== International ===
Servania represented Puerto Rico U20's in the 2018 CONCACAF U-20 Championship, where he scored seven goals in just five appearances. He made his senior debut with the Puerto Rico national football team on January 19, 2021, in a friendly match against Dominican Republic.

== Career statistics ==
=== International ===
As of match played 5 June 2026

Appearances and goals by national team and year
National team	Year	Apps	Goals
Puerto Rico	2021	6	1
Puerto Rico	2022	2	0
Puerto Rico	2023	4	0
Puerto Rico	2024	8	1
Puerto Rico	2025	5	0
Puerto Rico	2026	3	0
Total		28	2

Scores and results list Puerto Rico's goal tally first, score column indicates score after each Servania goal.

List of international goals scored by Jaden Servanua
No.	Date	Venue	Opponent	Score	Result	Competition
1	June 2, 2021	Mayagüez Athletics Stadium, Mayagüez, Puerto Rico	Bahamas	6–0	7–0	2022 FIFA World Cup qualification
2	November 15, 2024	Mayagüez Athletics Stadium, Mayagüez, Puerto Rico	Aruba	4–1	5–1	2024–25 CONCACAF Nations League B

== Personal ==
Jaden is the brother of fellow professional soccer player Brandon Servania who currently plays for DC United.
