= Max Flick =

American soccer player (born 1994)

Personal information
- Date of birth: June 29, 1994 (age 32)
- Place of birth: Beaver Falls, Pennsylvania, U.S.
- Height: 6 ft 0 in (1.83 m)
- Position: Defender

College career
Years	Team	Apps	(Gls)
2013–2015	Point Park University		

Senior career*
Years	Team	Apps	(Gls)
2021–2023	North Carolina FC	67	(3)
- * Club domestic league appearances and goals

Max Flick (born June 29, 1994) is an American former association football player who played as a defender. He spent his professional career with North Carolina FC in USL League One, where he played from 2021 to 2023. He retired after the 2023 season, which ended with North Carolina FC winning the USL League One championship.

== Early life and college ==
Flick was born in Beaver Falls, Pennsylvania. He attended Blackhawk High School, where he played soccer as a midfielder and graduated in 2012.

Flick initially attended Geneva College and was listed on its men's soccer roster in 2012. He transferred to Point Park University in 2013 and played three seasons for the Pioneers.

During his first season at Point Park, Flick was named the Kentucky Intercollegiate Athletic Conference Offensive Player of the Week in October 2013. At the time of the award, he had scored six goals and recorded five assists in 15 starts. In a 6–1 victory over Brescia University, he scored twice and provided two assists. Flick also scored in Point Park's 3–1 win over West Virginia Tech in September and recorded a goal in the Pioneers' first-round NAIA tournament match against the University of Rio Grande later that season.

He remained with Point Park through the 2015 season. The university's records list him as a senior midfielder in 2015, and he graduated from Point Park in 2016.

== Amateur career ==
After college, Flick continued playing in the Pittsburgh area while pursuing a professional opportunity. He played for the Fort Pitt Regiment of the National Premier Soccer League and was selected to an NPSL Midwest Region East Conference XI in 2018.

Flick later joined the Pittsburgh Hotspurs for their inaugural NPSL season in 2019. The club described him as a fullback and noted that he had previously played for the Pittsburgh Strikers and Century United. During his college years, he also played for the Pittsburgh Riverhounds' team in the Premier Development League, later known as USL League Two.

Flick's route toward professional soccer included repeated attempts at open tryouts. According to a later account published by North Carolina FC, he attended tryouts with several clubs and had previously been rejected by North Carolina FC before returning for the club's 2021 open tryout.

== Professional career ==
=== North Carolina FC ===
Flick joined North Carolina FC in 2021 after attending the club's open tryout and subsequently being invited to preseason camp. The club signed him on April 15, 2021, making his professional debut that season. He had previously played only in college and amateur soccer before joining the club.

In his first professional season, Flick made 25 appearances and scored two goals. He was named North Carolina FC's Defensive Player of the Year and, in a vote of his teammates, the club's Most Valuable Player. He was also selected to the USL League One Team of the Week in Week 12.

Flick remained with North Carolina FC for the 2022 season. He made 24 appearances in USL League One, scoring one goal and recording two assists. He became a regular starter late in the season after initially serving in a more limited role. In August 2022, he scored his first goal of the season against the Richmond Kickers, and by the end of September he had started six of the club's previous seven matches.

Flick's final season came in 2023. He made 18 appearances in USL League One, generally as a substitute, for a total of 137 minutes. He made his 50th appearance for North Carolina FC on April 1, 2023.

North Carolina FC reached the 2023 USL League One final and defeated the Charlotte Independence on penalties after a 1–1 draw. Flick was an unused substitute for most of the match but entered the game late in extra time and participated in the penalty shootout. The championship was the first USL League One title in North Carolina FC history.

Flick retired from professional soccer following the 2023 season. In a January 2024 interview with North Carolina FC, he said that he and his family had known before the championship match that it would be his final game. The club described the 2023 championship as the conclusion of his three-season professional career with North Carolina FC.

== Career statistics ==
USL League One
Season	Club	Appearances	Goals	Assists
2021	North Carolina FC	25	2	0
2022	North Carolina FC	24	1	2
2023	North Carolina FC	18	0	0
Total		67	3	2

Source: FBref.
