= João Delgado =

Portuguese footballer

Personal information
- Full name: João Francisco Ferreira Delgado
- Date of birth: 15 September 1994 (age 32)
- Place of birth: Torres Novas, Portugal
- Height: 1.72 m (5 ft 8 in)
- Position: Attacking midfielder

Team information
- Current team: Nona FC
- Number: 18

Youth career
- 2011–2013: União Leiria

College career
Years	Team	Apps	(Gls)
2016–2017	Bluefield Rams	37	(21)
2019	Lynn Fighting Knights	19	(0)

Senior career*
Years	Team	Apps	(Gls)
2013–2014	União Leiria	9	(0)
2014–2015	Atlético Riachense	23	(6)
2015	Eléctrico	6	(0)
2015–2016	Alcanenense	14	(2)
2018	Myrtle Beach Mutiny	13	(5)
2019	Reading United	6	(1)
2021–2022	FC Tucson	33	(3)
2023	Nona FC		
- * Club domestic league appearances and goals as of 16 October 2022

João Francisco Ferreira Delgado (born 15 September 1994) is a Portuguese footballer who plays as a midfielder for Nona FC.

== Career ==
=== Early career ===
Delgado played as part of the academy at União Leiria, before going on to spend time with various clubs in the third-tier of Portuguese football between 2013 and 2016.

=== College and amateur ===
In 2016, Delgado moved to the United States to play college soccer at Bluefield College in Virginia. In two seasons with the Rams, Delgado made 37 appearances, scoring 21 goals and tallying 5 assists. He was also named Soccer Coaches First Team All-American, finished third in the Appalachian Athletic Conference in goals, and ranked second in the nation in game-winning goals during his junior year of collegiate play.

Delgado also played one season at Lynn University in Florida in 2019. Here he made 19 appearances and finished with 2 assists, as well as Second Team All-SSC honors.

During his time in the United States, Delgado also played in the USL League Two for Myrtle Beach Mutiny and Reading United AC.

=== FC Tucson ===
On 17 February 2021, Delgado signed with USL League One side FC Tucson. He made his debut for Tucson on 8 May 2021, appearing as an 86th-minute substitute during a 1–1 draw with Forward Madison. He score his first goal for the club on 16 May 2021, the club's only goal during a 5–1 loss to Fort Lauderdale CF.
