= Deri Corfe =

English footballer

Personal information
- Full name: Deri Antony Corfe
- Date of birth: 3 March 1998 (age 28)
- Place of birth: Chester, England
- Height: 1.88 m (6 ft 2 in)
- Position: Forward

Team information
- Current team: PSIS Semarang
- Number: 7

Youth career
- 2010–2016: Manchester City

College career
Years	Team	Apps	(Gls)
2016–2017	Rio Grande Red Storm	30	(17)
2018–2019	Wright State Raiders	40	(24)

Senior career*
Years	Team	Apps	(Gls)
2018–2019	Ocean City Nor'easters	27	(20)
2020	New York Red Bulls II	11	(2)
2021–2022	FC Tucson	38	(9)
2022	Arbroath	8	(0)
2023	Napier City Rovers	27	(21)
2024	Dandenong Thunder	5	(2)
2024–2025	Persiraja Banda Aceh	21	(14)
2025–2026	PSIM Yogyakarta	30	(3)
2026–	PSIS Semarang	9	(2)
- * Club domestic league appearances and goals as of 21 November 2026

Deri Antony Corfe (born 3 March 1998) is an English professional footballer who plays as a forward for Championship club PSIS Semarang.

== Early life and career ==
Born in Chester, England, Corfe spent his childhood with the Manchester City youth academy, before moving to the United States to play football at University of Rio Grande. After two seasons, he transferred to Wright State University.

During his junior and senior years, Corfe played for the Ocean City Nor'easters, where he would later be named as the USL League Two MVP for the 2019 season after recording 14 goals and three assists in 12 matches.

== Professional career ==
=== New York Red Bulls ===
Corfe was select 41st overall in the 2020 MLS SuperDraft by the New York Red Bulls. He signed with the club's USL Championship side New York Red Bulls II on 6 March 2020. Corfe was released by Red Bulls II on 30 November 2020.

=== FC Tucson ===
On 13 April 2021, Corfe joined USL League One side FC Tucson ahead of the 2021 season. Corfe and Tucson mutually agreed to end his contract with the club on July 22, 2022.

=== Arbroath ===
Corfe signed a one-year contract with Scottish Championship club Arbroath in August 2022. He left the club in January 2023 at the end of his short-term deal.

=== Napier City Rovers ===
In February 2023, Corfe joined New Zealand Central League side Napier City Rovers.

=== Dandenong Thunder ===
In February 2024, Corfe joined NPL Victoria side Dandenong Thunder.

=== Indonesia ===
After a season in Liga 2 with Persiraja Banda Aceh, Corfe signed for newly promoted Liga 1 club PSIM Yogyakarta in June 2025.

== Career statistics ==
As of match played 21 November 2026

Appearances and goals by club, season and competition
Club	Season	League			National cup		League cup		Other		Total	
Club	Season	Division	Apps	Goals	Apps	Goals	Apps	Goals	Apps	Goals	Apps	Goals
Ocean City Nor'easters	2018	USL League Two	14	6	2	0	0	0	0	0	16	6
Ocean City Nor'easters	2019	USL League Two	13	14	0	0	0	0	0	0	13	14
Ocean City Nor'easters	Total		27	20	2	0	0	0	0	0	29	20
New York Red Bulls II	2020	USL Championship	11	2	0	0	0	0	0	0	11	2
FC Tucson	2021	USL League One	29	8	0	0	0	0	0	0	29	8
FC Tucson	2022	USL League One	9	1	1	0	0	0	0	0	10	1
FC Tucson	Total		38	9	1	0	0	0	0	0	39	9
Arbroath	2022–23	Scottish Championship	8	0	1	0	1	0	0	0	10	0
Napier City Rovers	2023	Central League	18	15	3	3	—		9 (Note: Appearance(s) in National League)	6	30	24
Dandenong Thunder	2024	NPL Victoria	2	2	0	0	0	0	0	0	2	2
Persiraja Banda Aceh	2024–25	Liga 2	21	14	—		—		0	0	21	14
PSIM Yogyakarta	2025–26	Super League	30	3	—		—		0	0	30	3
PSIS Semarang	2026–27	Championship	9	2	—		0	0	—		9	2
Career total			164	67	6	3	1	0	5	6	181	76

== Honours ==
=== Individual ===
- USL League Two MVP (1): 2019
