= Christian Lue Young =

American soccer player

Christian Young
Personal information
- Full name: Christian Lue Young
- Date of birth: December 9, 1996 (age 29)
- Place of birth: Plantation, Florida, United States
- Height: 1.83 m (6 ft 0 in)
- Position: Right-back

Youth career
- Weston FC

College career
Years	Team	Apps	(Gls)
2015	Army Black Knights	18	(0)
2016	Broward Seahawks	13	(2)
2017–2019	Akron Zips	23	(1)

Senior career*
Years	Team	Apps	(Gls)
2019	Tormenta FC 2	9	(1)
2020–2021	Fort Lauderdale CF	30	(1)
2022–2023	North Carolina FC	59	(1)
2024	Lexington SC	21	(1)
- * Club domestic league appearances and goals as of November 21, 2024

Christian Lue Young (born December 9, 1996) is an American soccer player who last played as a right-back for Lexington SC in USL League One.

== Career ==
=== Fort Lauderdale CF ===
Lue Young made his league debut for the club on July 18, 2020, coming on as a 73rd-minute substitute for Brian Rosales in a 2–0 defeat to the Greenville Triumph.

=== North Carolina FC ===
On January 6, 2022, Lue Young signed with North Carolina FC of USL League One. He scored his first goal for the club August 10, 2022, in injury time to score the winning goal in a 2–1 win over Forward Madison.
