= Shak Adams =

Vincentian footballer (born 1998)

Personal information
- Full name: Shakeem Adams
- Date of birth: September 7, 1998 (age 28)
- Place of birth: Nashville, Tennessee, United States
- Height: 5 ft 7 in (1.70 m)
- Positions: Winger; forward

Youth career
- Tennessee SC

College career
Years	Team	Apps	(Gls)
2016–2019	Florida Gulf Coast Eagles	71	(23)

Senior career*
Years	Team	Apps	(Gls)
2017	Nashville SC U23	14	(4)
2019	Seattle Sounders FC U-23	11	(1)
2020–2021	FC Tucson	38	(12)
2022	Charleston Battery	9	(0)
2022	→ North Carolina FC (loan)	13	(2)
2023	North Carolina FC	13	(0)

International career^{‡}
2024–	Saint Vincent and the Grenadines	4	(2)
- * Club domestic league appearances and goals as of May 3, 2024 ‡ National team caps and goals as of 02:10, 19 March 2025 (UTC)

Shakeem Adams (born September 7, 1998) is a professional footballer. Born in the United States, he plays for the Saint Vincent and the Grenadines national team.

== Playing career ==
=== Youth, college and amateur ===
Shak played youth soccer at Tennessee Soccer Club, before playing college soccer at Florida Gulf Coast University from 2016 to 2019. During his time with the Eagles, Adams made 71 appearances, scoring 23 goals and tallying 16 assists.

Whilst at college, Adams played in the USL League Two with Nashville SC U23 in 2017 and Seattle Sounders FC U-23 in 2019.

=== MLS SuperDraft ===
On January 13, 2020, Adams was selected 54th overall in the 2020 MLS SuperDraft by Nashville SC. However, he was released by the club in late February.

=== FC Tucson ===
On February 27, 2020, Adams signed with USL League One side FC Tucson. He made his professional debut on July 25, 2020, appearing as a 70th-minute substitute in a 2–1 win over Fort Lauderdale CF.

=== Charleston Battery ===
On January 20, 2022, Adams made the move to USL Championship side Charleston Battery. Following the 2022 season, Adams was released by Charleston.

==== North Carolina FC (loan) ====
On July 8, 2022, Adams was loaned to USL League One club North Carolina FC for the remainder of the 2022 season. Adams made his debut for North Carolina on July 9, 2022, during a 1–1 draw with Union Omaha.

=== North Carolina FC ===
On December 16, 2022, it was announced Adams would join North Carolina FC on a permanent basis for the 2023 season.

== International career ==
Born in the United States, Adams is of Vincentian descent. He was called up to the Saint Vincent and the Grenadines national team for a set of 2024–25 CONCACAF Nations League matches in November 2024.
