= Nelson Blanco =

Salvadoran footballer (born 1999)

Personal information
- Full name: Nelson Blanco Flores
- Date of birth: 17 August 1999 (age 27)
- Place of birth: San Miguel, El Salvador
- Height: 1.68 m (5 ft 6 in)
- Position: Left-back

Team information
- Current team: San Antonio FC
- Number: 4

Youth career
- –2014: Arlington SA
- 2015–2017: D.C. United

Senior career*
Years	Team	Apps	(Gls)
2017–2018	North Carolina FC	4	(0)
2019–2020	San Diego 1904	6	(1)
2020	Oakland Roots	2	(0)
2021–2024	North Carolina FC	86	(0)
2024–	San Antonio FC	55	(0)

International career^{‡}
2021–	El Salvador	8	(0)
- * Club domestic league appearances and goals as of 31 October 2026 ‡ National team caps and goals as of 1 April 2023

Nelson Blanco Flores (born 17 August 1999) is a Salvadoran footballer who plays as a left-back for San Antonio FC in the USL Championship and for the El Salvador national team.

== Club career ==
Blanco played for the academy team at D.C. United for three seasons before signing with North American Soccer League side North Carolina FC on 11 October 2017. He re-signed with North Carolina on 29 January 2018, when the club moved to the United Soccer League. In August 2019, he joined San Diego 1904 FC, an expansion team in the National Independent Soccer Association.

On August 6, 2020, Blanco signed with Oakland Roots SC of the National Independent Soccer Association.

In March 2021, Blanco returned to North Carolina FC of USL League One.

Blanco transferred to San Antonio FC on June 14, 2024.

== International career ==
Blanco debuted for the El Salvador national team in a 1–0 friendly win over Bolivia on 6 November 2021. Blanco started his first game for the El Salvador national team in a 1–1 tie vs Ecuador on 4 December 2021. He was also called for the World Cup qualifiers.
