= 2025 Forward Madison FC season =

Forward Madison FC
2025 season
- Owner: Big Top Events
- Chief operating officer: Conor Caloia
- Head coach: Matt Glaeser
- Stadium: Breese Stevens Field
- USL League One: 10th
- U.S. Open Cup: Second round
- USL Cup: Group 3: 5th
- Top goalscorer: League: Derek Gebhard (11); All: Derek Gebhard (11)
- Highest home attendance: 5,010 (September 13 vs. RIC)
- Lowest home attendance: 3,368 (July 23 vs. TRM)
- Average home league attendance: 3,991
- Biggest win: 4 goals: MAD 5–1 DUL (March 20, USOC)
- Biggest defeat: 4 goals: MAD 0–4 IND (April 26, USL Cup); TRM 4–0 MAD (August 30); OMA 4–0 MAD (October 18); RIC 5–1 MAD (October 25)

The 2025 Forward Madison FC season was the seventh season in the soccer team's history, where they competed in USL League One of the third division of American soccer.

== Overview ==
Forward Madison entered the 2025 season on the heels of what was arguably their best season. In 2024, the team finished 3rd in the USL League One table, their highest finish ever, and reached the semifinals of the USL League One playoffs. Additionally, they were runners-up in the inaugural USL Cup, losing on penalties in the final. The team returned over half of the 2024 roster, including All-USL League One First Team defender and Defender of the Year nominee Mitch Osmond, Goalkeeper of the Year nominee Bernd Schipmann, and All-League One First Team midfielder Devin Boyce, though they did lose club all-time leading goalscorer Christian Chaney to Charlotte Independence. The large core of players returning from the previous year's successful season had Forward Madison considered to be an early preseason favorite to win the 2025 USL League One title. Various power rankings placed Forward Madison in the top half of the league leading up to the start of the season.

The schedule for both the 2025 USL League One season and the 2025 USL Cup were announced on December 19th. In the regular season, Forward Madison played each team twice, with the exception of Richmond Kickers, Union Omaha, Westchester SC, and Texoma FC, each of whom they played three times. Forward Madison faced USL Championship club FC Tulsa in the U.S. Open Cup, as well as Indy Eleven and Birmingham Legion FC in the USL Cup; this marked the first time that Forward Madison played a competitive match against a team in USL Championship since 2019, when they defeated El Paso Locomotive FC and lost to Saint Louis FC in the 2019 U.S. Open Cup, and the first time the team ever hosted a USL Championship club.

In January, Forward Madison announced a partnership with Brazilian club Amazonas, who were competing in the Campeonato Brasileiro Série B at the time of the announcement. It was the first partnership between a USL League One club and a Brazilian club. As part of this partnership, Amazonas sent forward Adrien Graffin on loan to Madison, with Forward Madison transferring Riley Binns to Amazonas in July.

== Club ==
=== Roster ===
No.	Pos.	Nat.	Name	Date of birth (age)	Since	On loan from
1	GK	(Philippines)	Bernd Schipmann	July 5, 1994 (age 32)	2023	
2	DF	(Israel)	Michael Chilaka	February 5, 2000 (age 26)	2024	
3	MF	(Spain)	Damià Viader	February 19, 1998 (age 28)	2025	
4	DF	(Australia)	Mitch Osmond	March 11, 1994 (age 32)	2022	
5	DF	(United States)	Timmy Mehl	August 31, 1995 (age 31)	2023	
6	MF	(United States)	John Murphy	April 19, 2000 (age 26)	2024	
7	MF	(Germany)	Jackson Dietrich	September 27, 1996 (age 30)	2025	
8	MF	(United States)	Devin Boyce	September 8, 1996 (age 30)	2024	
9	FW	(United States)	Garrett McLaughlin	November 10, 1997 (age 28)	2024	
10	MF	(England)	Aiden Mesias	October 23, 1999 (age 26)	2023	
11	MF	(United States)	Christopher Garcia	January 13, 2003 (age 23)	2025	
12	GK	(United States)	Owen Finnerty	February 7, 2001 (age 25)	2025	
13	MF	(Nigeria)	Temi Ereku	November 23, 2003 (age 22)	2025	Birmingham Legion FC
14	DF	(United States)	Jason Ramos	October 9, 1998 (age 27)	2025	
16	DF	(Austria)	Jake Crull	October 3, 1997 (age 28)	2023	
17	FW	(United States)	Derek Gebhard	October 15, 1995 (age 30)	2021	
18	FW	(United States)	Adrien Graffin	January 2, 2004 (age 22)	2025	(Brazil) Amazonas
19	FW	(Colombia)	Juan Galindrez	July 4, 1994 (age 32)	2024	
21	MF	(Mexico)	José Carrera-García	July 20, 1995 (age 31)	2025	
22	DF	(United States)	Eddie Munjoma	July 18, 1998 (age 28)	2025	
24	FW	(South Africa)	Nazeem Bartman	August 13, 1993 (age 33)	2022	
25	DF	(Democratic Republic of the Congo)	Ferrety Sousa	December 25, 1990 (age 35)	2024	
36	GK	(United States)	Wallis Lapsley	April 14, 1997 (age 29)	2025	
70	FW	(Brazil)	Lucca Dourado	October 3, 2000 (age 25)	2025	Birmingham Legion FC
77	FW	(Jamaica)	Nico Brown	August 11, 1998 (age 28)	2025	Lexington SC
80	MF	(Puerto Rico)	Isaac Angking	January 24, 2000 (age 26)	2025	Rhode Island FC

=== Left team mid-season ===
No.	Pos.	Nat.	Name	Date of birth (age)	Since	On loan from
20	DF	(England)	Laurie Bell	September 1, 1992 (age 34)	2025	
26	MF	(United States)	Riley Binns (Note: USL Academy contract)	January 26, 2007 (age 19)	2025	
99	FW	(United States)	Dean Boltz	June 7, 2006 (age 20)	2025	Chicago Fire FC

=== Coaching staff ===
Name	Position
(United States) Matt Glaeser	Head coach and technical director
(United States) Neil Hlavaty	Assistant coach
(United States) Jim Launder	Assistant coach
(United States) Aaron Hohlbein	Assistant coach

==== Left team mid-season ====
Name	Position	Departure Date	Reason for departure
(United States) John Pascarella	Assistant coach	August 22, 2025	Hired as assistant coach by Tampa Bay Rowdies

=== Front office staff ===
Name	Position
(United States) Conor Caloia	Chief operating officer
(United States) Vern Stenman	President
(United States) Keith Tiemeyer	Director of Soccer Operations & Development

== Player movement ==
=== Returning players ===
Date	Position	Player	Notes	Ref.
	FW	(United States) Garrett McLaughlin	Under contract	
December 9, 2024	GK	(Philippines) Bernd Schipmann	Re-signed	
December 11, 2024	MF	(United States) John Murphy	Contract option exercised	
December 13, 2024	DF	(Democratic Republic of the Congo) Ferrety Sousa	Contract option exercised	
December 16, 2024	DF	(Australia) Mitch Osmond	Re-signed	
December 20, 2024	FW	(Colombia) Juan Galindrez	Contract option exercised	
December 23, 2024	FW	(United States) Derek Gebhard	Contract option exercised	
December 25, 2024	DF	(Austria) Jake Crull	Re-signed	
December 27, 2024	MF	(England) Aiden Mesias	Re-signed	
December 30, 2024	FW	(South Africa) Nazeem Bartman	Contract option exercised	
January 1, 2025	DF	(Israel) Michael Chilaka	Re-signed	
January 3, 2025	MF	(United States) Devin Boyce	Contract option exercised	
January 8, 2025	DF	(United States) Timmy Mehl	Re-signed	

=== Transfers in ===
Date	Position	Player	Last team	Type	Ref.
January 13, 2025	MF	(Germany) Jackson Dietrich	Northern Colorado Hailstorm FC	Free transfer	
January 17, 2025	MF	(United States) Christopher Garcia	El Paso Locomotive FC	Free transfer	
January 22, 2025	GK	(United States) Wallis Lapsley	Union Omaha	Free transfer	
January 31, 2025	FW	(United States) Adrien Graffin	(Brazil) Amazonas	Loan	
February 4, 2025	FW	(Jamaica) Nico Brown	Lexington SC	Loan	
February 12, 2025	MF	(Mexico) José Carrera-García	Central Valley Fuego FC	Free transfer	
March 11, 2025	DF	(England) Laurie Bell		Free transfer	
March 13, 2025	DF	(United States) Eddie Munjoma	Tampa Bay Rowdies	Free transfer	
March 19, 2025	GK	(United States) Owen Finnerty	Inter Miami CF II	Free transfer	
March 25, 2025	MF	(United States) Riley Binns	Greenfield High School	Free transfer	
April 1, 2025	MF	(Spain) Damià Viader	Sacramento Republic FC	Free transfer	
May 16, 2025	FW	(Brazil) Lucca Dourado	Birmingham Legion FC	Loan	
July 11, 2025	MF	(Nigeria) Temi Ereku	Birmingham Legion FC	Loan	
July 25, 2025	MF	(Puerto Rico) Isaac Angking	Rhode Island FC	Loan	
July 31, 2025	DF	(United States) Jason Ramos	Central Valley Fuego FC	Free transfer	
August 26, 2025	FW	(United States) Dean Boltz	Chicago Fire FC	Loan	

=== Transfers out ===
Date	Position	Player	To	Type	Ref.
November 18, 2024	FW	(Uruguay) Agustín Dávila		Contract expired	
November 18, 2024	FW	(United States) Cherif Dieye		Contract expired	
November 18, 2024	MF	(United States) Wolfgang Prentice	Oakland Roots SC	End of loan	
November 18, 2024	GK	(United States) Martin Sanchez		Contract expired	
November 18, 2024	MF	(United States) Jimmie Villalobos	One Knoxville SC	End of loan	
December 22, 2024	FW	(Venezuela) Mauro Cichero		Retired	
December 23, 2024	DF	(United States) Stephen Payne	Westchester SC	Free transfer	
March 12, 2025	FW	(United States) Christian Chaney	Charlotte Independence	Free transfer	
April 5, 2025	DF	(England) Laurie Bell		Contract expired	
July 14, 2025	MF	(United States) Riley Binns	(Brazil) Amazonas	Free transfer	
October 25, 2025	FW	(United States) Dean Boltz	Chicago Fire FC	Recalled from loan	

== Exhibitions ==
February 14, 2025 Preseason 1	Minnesota United FC 2	v	Forward Madison FC	Blaine, Minnesota
				Stadium: National Sports Center
Note: Closed to the public. Score and stats were not announced.

February 21, 2025 Preseason 2	Indy Eleven	5–0	Forward Madison FC	Westfield, Indiana
11:00 AM EST	Blake 16' (Stanley); Williams 56', 81' (Collier); Brynéus 62' (Collier)	Report	86' (o.g.)	Stadium: Grand Park Events Center

March 1, 2025 Preseason 3	Chicago Fire FC II	v	Forward Madison FC	Bridgeview, Illinois
				Stadium: Bridgeview Sports Dome
Note: Closed to the public. Score and stats were not announced.

March 8, 2025 Preseason 4	Forward Madison FC	2–2	Drake Bulldogs	Madison, Wisconsin
2:00 PM CST	McLaughlin 9' (Gebhard); Galindrez 64' (Brown); Murphy (yellow card) 66'	Report	Kirsch 25'; Schrage 67'; Petrich (yellow card) 75'	Stadium: Breese Stevens Field

April 5, 2025 Midseason 1	Forward Madison FC	2–2	Wisconsin Badgers	Madison, Wisconsin
6:00 PM CDT	Bartman; Bell 90' (pen.)	Report	Porter (yellow card) 8'; Zachemski 49'; Raimbault 55'; Arntsen (yellow card) 83'	Stadium: Breese Stevens Field

June 25, 2025 Midseason 2	Forward Madison FC	0–1	Tigres UANL U23s	Madison, Wisconsin
7:00 PM CDT	Chilaka (red card) 60'; Boyce (yellow card) 79'	Report	Wood 23', (yellow card) 60'; #195 (yellow card) 60'	Stadium: Breese Stevens Field

== Competitions ==
=== Overview ===
Competition	First match	Last match	Starting round	Final position	Record							
Competition	First match	Last match	Starting round	Final position	Pld	W	D	L	GF	GA	GD	Win %
USL League One	March 15, 2025	October 25, 2025	Matchday 1	TBD	30	8	11	11	31	43	−12	26.67
U.S. Open Cup	March 20, 2025	April 2, 2025	First round	Second round	2	1	0	1	6	3	+3	50.00
USL Cup	April 26, 2025	July 26, 2025	Group stage	Group 3: 5th	4	1	1	2	3	7	−4	25.00
Total					36	10	12	14	40	53	−13	27.78

Source: Competitions

=== USL League One ===
==== Standings ====
Pos	Team	Pld	W	L	T	GF	GA	GD	Pts	Qualification
8	Charlotte Independence	30	10	13	7	45	50	−5	37	Playoffs
9	AV Alta FC	30	8	10	12	42	47	−5	36	
10	Forward Madison FC	30	8	11	11	31	43	−12	35	
11	Greenville Triumph SC	30	8	14	8	38	43	−5	32	
12	Texoma FC	30	7	14	9	35	55	−20	30	

Source: USL League One
Rules for classification: 1) points; 2) total wins; 3) total goal differential; 4) total goals scored; 5) points earned against top four finishers; 6) disciplinary points; 7) drawing of lots.

==== Results summary ====
Overall								Home						Away					
Pld	W	D	L	GF	GA	GD	Pts	W	D	L	GF	GA	GD	W	D	L	GF	GA	GD
30	8	11	11	31	43	−12	35	5	7	3	16	11	+5	3	4	8	15	32	−17

Source: USL League One

==== Results by round ====
Round	1	2	3	4	5	6	7	8	9	10	11	12	13	14	15	16	17	18	19	20	21	22	23	24	25	26	27	28	29	30
Stadium	A	A	A	H	H	A	A	H	H	A	H	A	H	H	H	H	A	H	H	H	H	A	A	H	A	A	A	H	A	A
Result	L	W	D	D	D	D	D	D	L	L	L	L	W	D	W	D	L	D	D	L	W	L	D	W	L	W	W	W	L	L
Position	11	9	8	9	10	11	10	9	11	12	13	14	13	13	11	10	11	11	11	12	11	13	13	11	12	11	9	9	10	10
Points	0	3	4	5	6	7	8	9	9	9	9	9	12	13	16	17	17	18	19	19	22	22	23	26	26	29	32	35	35	35

Source: USL League One
H = Home; A = Away; W = Win; D = Draw; L = Loss

==== Matches ====
March 15, 2025 1	FC Naples	2–0	Forward Madison FC	Naples, Florida
7:00 PM EDT	Henderlong 22' (Onen), 41' (Cerro); Onen (yellow card) 24'; Glasser (yellow card) 90'; Fernandes (yellow card) 90+4'	Report	Murphy (yellow card) 20'	Stadium: Paradise Coast Sports Complex; Attendance: 4,598; Referee: Edson Carvajal

March 29, 2025 2	Richmond Kickers	1–2	Forward Madison FC	Richmond, Virginia
6:00 PM EDT	Espinal 50'	Report	Gebhard 40' (McLaughlin), 48'; Boyce (yellow card) 43'; Sousa (yellow card) 49'; Dietrich (yellow card) 73'; Lapsley (yellow card) 90+1'; Murphy (yellow card) 90+5'	Stadium: City Stadium; Attendance: 4,576; Referee: Deny Kulasinac

April 11, 2025 3	Charlotte Independence	1–1	Forward Madison FC	Charlotte, North Carolina
7:00 PM EDT	Álvarez (yellow card) 7', (goal) 83'; Chaney (yellow card) 26'; Jauregui (yellow card) 38'; Ousmanou (yellow card) 63'; Ndiaye (yellow card) 68'; Ciss (yellow card) 85'; Bakero (yellow card) 88'	Report	Chilaka (yellow card) 16'; Lapsley (yellow card) 26'; Mehl (yellow card) 43'; Sousa (yellow card) 75'; Bartman 88' (Mehl); Carrera-García (yellow card) 90+1'	Stadium: American Legion Memorial Stadium; Attendance: 685; Referee: John Matto

April 19, 2025 4	Forward Madison FC	1–1	Texoma FC	Madison, Wisconsin
6:00 PM CDT	Osmond (yellow card) 61'; Mehl (yellow card) 63'; Gebhard 90+5'	Report	Jordan (yellow card) 28'; Mason (yellow card) 65'; Padilla 73' (Perkins), (yellow card) 84'; Jawneh (yellow card) 79'; McManus (yellow card) 90+1' (yellow-red card) 90+1'	Stadium: Breese Stevens Field; Attendance: 3,463; Referee: Drew Klemp

May 3, 2025 5	Forward Madison FC	0–0	Union Omaha	Madison, Wisconsin
5:00 PM CDT	Gebhard (yellow card) 37'; Murphy (yellow card) 54'; Carrera-García (yellow card) 58'; Brown (yellow card) 80'	Report	Knapp (yellow card) 57'	Stadium: Breese Stevens Field; Attendance: 3,482; Referee: Atahan Yaya

May 9, 2025 6	One Knoxville SC	1–1	Forward Madison FC	Knoxville, Tennessee
6:30 PM EDT	Rosamilia 59' (Zarokostas); Brown (yellow card) 81'; Diene (yellow card) 90+1'	Report	Crull 61'; Brown (yellow card) 66'	Stadium: Covenant Health Park; Attendance: 4,510; Referee: Cristian Campo

May 17, 2025 7	Westchester SC	1–1	Forward Madison FC	Mount Vernon, New York
4:00 PM EDT	Obregón 17', (yellow card) 68'; Lawrence (yellow card) 44'; Drack (yellow card) 72'; Bouman (yellow card) 73'	Report	Gebhard 40' (pen.); Chilaka (yellow card) 45+1'; Boyce (yellow card) 55'; Carrera-García (yellow card) 89'	Stadium: The Stadium at Memorial Field; Attendance: 1,533; Referee: Alejo Calume

May 24, 2025 8	Forward Madison FC	1–1	Portland Hearts of Pine	Madison, Wisconsin
6:00 PM CDT	Boyce 7' (pen.); Viader (yellow card) 38'; Garcia (yellow card) 67'	Report	Messer; Lopez (yellow card) 41'; Varela (yellow card) 45+3'; Poon-Angeron (yellow card) 69'; Kamara (yellow card) 72'; Vinberg (yellow card) 76'; Wright (yellow card) 90+3'	Stadium: Breese Stevens Field; Attendance: 3,954; Referee: Amin Hadzic

June 7, 2025 9	Forward Madison FC	0–1	Union Omaha	Madison, Wisconsin
7:00 PM CDT	Murphy (yellow card) 79'; Sousa (yellow card) 85' (yellow-red card) 89'	Report	Martinez 14'; Owusu (yellow card) 48'; Acoff (yellow card) 53'	Stadium: Breese Stevens Field; Attendance: 4,207; Referee: Muhammad Kaleia

June 14, 2025 10	Spokane Velocity FC	2–1	Forward Madison FC	Spokane, Washington
7:00 PM PDT	Reedy (yellow card) 13', (goal) 57'; John-Brown 22'; García (yellow card) 90+6'	Report	Dourado 48' (Garcia); Garcia (yellow card) 67'; Mehl (yellow card) 72'	Stadium: One Spokane Stadium; Attendance: 2,572; Referee: Rodrigo Albuquerque

June 18, 2025 11	Forward Madison FC	1–2	Westchester SC	Madison, Wisconsin
7:00 PM CDT	McLaughlin 4' (pen.); Schipmann (yellow card) 45'; Mesias (yellow card) 65'; Mehl (yellow card) 87'	Report	Saydee 22' (McGlynn); Obregón 45+1'; Pierre (yellow card) 48'; Mačkić (yellow card) 77'	Stadium: Breese Stevens Field; Attendance: 3,647; Referee: Greg Dopka

July 5, 2025 12	Texoma FC	2–0	Forward Madison FC	Sherman, Texas
7:30 PM CDT	McManus 24'; Jawneh (yellow card) 69'; Chavez 77' (Calfo); McCormick (yellow card) 87'; Ramos (yellow card) 90+2'; Dlamini (yellow card) 90+6'; Pepi (yellow card) 90+7'	Report	Mehl (yellow card) 45+2'; Sousa (red card) 45+4'	Stadium: Sherman Bearcat Stadium; Attendance: 1,120; Referee: Brian Yip

July 12, 2025 13	Forward Madison FC	3–1	Greenville Triumph SC	Madison, Wisconsin
7:00 PM CDT	Dourado 5' (Brown); Garcia (yellow card) 27'; Mesias (yellow card) 45+3'; Gebhard 56' (Dourado); Graffin (yellow card) 85'; Galindrez 89'	Report	Bubb (red card) 21'; Marsh 86' (Mensah); Corvino (yellow card) 90+2'	Stadium: Breese Stevens Field; Attendance: 4,383; Referee: Tim Wagner

July 16, 2025 14	Forward Madison FC	1–1	Charlotte Independence	Madison, Wisconsin
7:00 PM CDT	Mesias (yellow card) 33'; Garcia 44' (Dourado); Schipmann (yellow card) 57'; Murphy (yellow card) 72'; Bartman (yellow card) 76'	Report	Ousmanou (yellow card) 11'; Ciss (yellow card) 45+2'; Ndiaye 64' (Ciss)	Stadium: Breese Stevens Field; Attendance: 3,832; Referee: Justin St. Pierre

July 23, 2025 15	Forward Madison FC	1–0	South Georgia Tormenta FC	Madison, Wisconsin
7:00 PM CDT	Dourado 28' (Gebhard); Chilaka (yellow card) 45+2'	Report	Rasheed (yellow card) 26'; Alves (yellow card) 75'; Vivas (yellow card) 79'; Reid-Stephen (yellow card) 90+3'	Stadium: Breese Stevens Field; Attendance: 3,368; Referee: Shawn Tehini

August 2, 2025 16	Forward Madison FC	0–0	AV Alta FC	Madison, Wisconsin
5:00 PM CDT	Brown (yellow card) 63'	Report	Aoumaich (yellow card) 36'; Pehlivanov (yellow card) 44'; Ortiz (yellow card) 47'; Mariona (yellow card) 61'; Blancas (yellow card) 79'	Stadium: Breese Stevens Field; Attendance: 4,650; Referee: Carlos Rodriguez

August 6, 2025 17	Chattanooga Red Wolves SC	2–1	Forward Madison FC	East Ridge, Tennessee
7:00 PM EDT	Watters (yellow card) 45+1'; Green (yellow card) 52'; O. Hernandez 54' (Bentley); Bentley (yellow card) 73'; Vazquez	Report	Boyce (yellow card) 9'; Viader (yellow card) 67'; Gebhard 78' (McLaughlin)	Stadium: CHI Memorial Stadium; Attendance: 2,025; Referee: Alejo Calume

August 9, 2025 18	Forward Madison FC	2–2	One Knoxville SC	Madison, Wisconsin
7:00 PM CDT	Crull (yellow card) 14'; Mesias (yellow card) 45+2'; Gebhard 50' (Chilaka); McLaughlin 90+2' (Chilaka)	Report	Diene 40' (Gøling); Johnson (yellow card) 57'; Haugli 65' (Johnson)	Stadium: Breese Stevens Field; Attendance: 3,403; Referee: Calin Radosav

August 16, 2025 19	Forward Madison FC	0–0	FC Naples	Madison, Wisconsin
7:00 PM CDT	Murphy (yellow card) 32'; Mesias (yellow card) 33'; Brown (yellow card) 54'	Report	Garrett (yellow card) 79'	Stadium: Breese Stevens Field; Attendance: 4,305; Referee: Servando Berna Rico

August 21, 2025 20	Forward Madison FC	0–1	Spokane Velocity FC	Madison, Wisconsin
7:00 PM CDT	Chilaka (yellow card) 15'; Boyce (yellow card) 84'	Report	Peláez 37' (Lewis); L. Gil (yellow card) 85'	Stadium: Breese Stevens Field; Attendance: 3,689; Referee: Kyle Armstrong

August 27, 2025 21	Forward Madison FC	3–0	Texoma FC	Madison, Wisconsin
7:00 PM CDT	Dourado 17' (Viader), 28' (Angking); Viader (yellow card) 23'; Mehl (yellow card) 42'; Garcia (yellow card) 44'; Brown 83' (Bartman)	Report	Chavez (yellow card) 27'; McCormick (yellow card) 42' (yellow-red card) 90+5'; McManus (red card) 51'	Stadium: Breese Stevens Field; Attendance: 3,462; Referee: Jeremy Scheer

August 30, 2025 22	South Georgia Tormenta FC	4–0	Forward Madison FC	Statesboro, Georgia
7:30 PM EDT	Cabral (yellow card) 17'; Tunbridge (yellow card) 30'; Reid-Stephen 34', 37' (Vivas), (yellow card) 84'; Doyle (yellow card) 57'; Bwana 83' (Bazini); Rasheed 87' (Nyandjo)	Report	Boyce (yellow card) 52'; Ereku (yellow card) 69'	Stadium: Optim Sports Medicine Field at Tormenta Stadium; Attendance: 905; Referee: Stephen Foster

September 6, 2025 23	AV Alta FC	3–3	Forward Madison FC	Lancaster, California
7:30 PM PDT	Blancas 2', 60' (pen.); Pajaro 39' (Blancas); Martinez (yellow card) 63'	Report	Garcia (yellow card) 1'; Gebhard 32' (pen.); Angking 45', 55' (Mesias); Murphy (yellow card) 66'; Boyce (yellow card) 88'	Stadium: Lancaster Municipal Stadium; Attendance: 3,740; Referee: Trevor Wiseman

September 13, 2025 24	Forward Madison FC	1–0	Richmond Kickers	Madison, Wisconsin
6:00 PM CDT	Ramos (yellow card) 50'; Murphy (yellow card) 60'; Sousa 90+3' (Boyce), (yellow card) 90+4'	Report		Stadium: Breese Stevens Field; Attendance: 5,010; Referee: Drew Klemp

September 20, 2025 25	Greenville Triumph SC	3–0	Forward Madison FC	Greenville, South Carolina
7:00 PM EDT	Mensah 10' (Robles), 31' (Herrera), 46'; Soto (yellow card) 33'; Benton (yellow card) 64'; Patti (yellow card) 78'; Evans (yellow card) 89'	Report	Ramos (yellow card) 20'; Mehl (yellow card) 62'	Stadium: Paladin Stadium; Attendance: 2,677; Referee: Gerald Flores

September 28, 2025 26	Westchester SC	0–1	Forward Madison FC	Mount Vernon, New York
7:00 PM EDT	Palma (yellow card) 36'; Obregón (yellow card) 56'; Pierre (yellow card) 59'	Report	Gebhard 2' (Brown); Dourado (yellow card) 29'; Murphy (yellow card) 55'	Stadium: The Stadium at Memorial Field; Attendance: 1,190; Referee: Stephen Foster

October 4, 2025 27	Portland Hearts of Pine	1–3	Forward Madison FC	Portland, Maine
5:00 PM EDT	Lopez (yellow card) 22'; Green (yellow card) 42'; Keegan 72' (Kamara); Varela (yellow card) 76'; Kamara (red card) 82'; Langlois (yellow card) 89'	Report	Gebhard 20' (Viader); Dourado 36' (pen.); Angking (yellow card) 79'; Brown (yellow card) 85'; McLaughlin 90+2' (Galindrez)	Stadium: Fitzpatrick Stadium; Attendance: 5,771; Referee: Muhammad Kaleia

October 11, 2025 28	Forward Madison FC	2–1	Chattanooga Red Wolves SC	Madison, Wisconsin
5:00 PM CDT	Ramos (yellow card) 38'; Dourado 40' (Crull); Boyce (yellow card) 62'; Gebhard 76' (Mesias); Galindrez (yellow card) 90+4'	Report	Lelin (yellow card) 31'; Ramos 90' (Lombardi)	Stadium: Breese Stevens Field; Attendance: 5,004; Referee: Atahan Yaya

October 18, 2025 29	Union Omaha	4–0	Forward Madison FC	Papillion, Nebraska
6:00 PM CDT	Kasim (yellow card) 13'; Ors 45+2' (Schneider), 79' (Martinez); Milanese (yellow card) 45+3'; Becher 57'; Schneider (yellow card) 80'; Jiba 90+3' (Ostrem)	Report	Ramos (yellow card) 54'; Murphy (yellow card) 60'	Stadium: Werner Park; Attendance: 3,264; Referee: Dion Coxe-Trieger

October 25, 2025 30	Richmond Kickers	5–1	Forward Madison FC	Richmond, Virginia
6:00 PM EDT	Seufert 36' (Fitch), 71' (Fitch), (yellow card) 67'; Terzaghi 38' (Billhardt); Lage 45+3' (Billhardt), (yellow card) 79'; Barnathan (yellow card) 55'; Billhardt 63' (Espinal); Vaughan (yellow card) 86'	Report	Dourado 23' (Mesias); Boyce (yellow card) 56'; Crull (yellow card) 66'; Ramos (yellow card) 85'	Stadium: City Stadium; Attendance: 5,193; Referee: John Griggs

=== U.S. Open Cup ===
As a member of USL League One, Forward Madison FC is participating in the 2025 U.S. Open Cup. They entered in the first round of the competition, taking place from March 18–21, 2025.

March 20, 2025 First round	Forward Madison FC (Wisconsin)	5–1	(Minnesota) Duluth FC	Madison, Wisconsin
6:00 PM CDT	Sousa 39' (McLaughlin); Bell (yellow card) 63'; Munjoma 73' (Boyce); Galindrez 86' (Boyce), 90+6'; Murphy 90+3' (Boyce)	Report	Doyle (yellow card) 22'; Fernández (yellow card) 31', (goal) 64'; Mihov (red card) 35'; Santamaria (yellow card) 88'	Stadium: Breese Stevens Field; Referee: Peter Bernardy

April 2, 2025 Second round	Forward Madison FC (Wisconsin)	1–3	(Oklahoma) FC Tulsa	Madison, Wisconsin
6:30 PM CDT	Bartman 68' (Mehl); Murphy (yellow card) 76'; Mesias (yellow card) 90+2'; Garcia (yellow card) 90+5'	Report	Damm 21' (Calheira); ElMedkhar 31' (Lukic), (yellow card) 58'; Pierre (yellow card) 38'; Lukic (yellow card) 45+3'; Calheira 51' (pen.); Diallo (yellow card) 72' (yellow-red card) 88'	Stadium: Breese Stevens Field; Referee: Felix Granados

=== USL Jägermeister Cup ===
==== Standings — Group 3 ====
Pos	Lg	Team	Pld	W	PKW	PKL	L	GF	GA	GD	Pts	Qualification
1	USLC	Indy Eleven	4	3	1	0	0	8	2	+6	11	Advance to knockout stage
2	USLC	Birmingham Legion FC	4	3	0	1	0	8	4	+4	10	Advance to knockout stage (wild card)
3	USL1	Chattanooga Red Wolves SC	4	1	1	0	2	4	8	−4	5	
4	USLC	FC Tulsa	4	1	0	1	2	8	7	+1	4	
5	USL1	Forward Madison FC	4	1	0	1	2	3	7	−4	4	
6	USL1	One Knoxville SC	4	0	1	0	3	2	5	−3	2	

Updated to match(es) played on July 26, 2025. Source: USL
Rules for classification: 1) points; 2) head-to-head points earned in group play; 3) total wins in group play; 4) goals for in group play; 5) goals against in group play; 6) disciplinary points; 7) coin toss.

==== Results summary ====
Overall									Home							Away						
Pld	W	SOW	SOL	L	GF	GA	GD	Pts	W	SOW	SOL	L	GF	GA	GD	W	SOW	SOL	L	GF	GA	GD
4	1	0	1	2	3	7	−4	4	1	0	0	1	1	4	−3	0	0	1	1	2	3	−1

Source: USL League One

==== Group stage matches ====
April 26, 2025 1	Forward Madison FC	0–4	Indy Eleven	Madison, Wisconsin
6:00 PM CDT	Murphy (yellow card) 59'; Sousa (yellow card) 70'	Report	Rendón (yellow card) 20'; Murphy (yellow card) 50'; Quinn (yellow card) 60', (goal) 69'; Blake 72' (Collier); Amoh 84', 90+3'; Musa (yellow card) 90+3'	Stadium: Breese Stevens Field; Attendance: 3,748; Referee: Muhammad Hassan

May 31, 2025 2	Chattanooga Red Wolves SC	1–1 (4–2 p)	Forward Madison FC	East Ridge, Tennessee
7:00 PM EDT	Bentley; Gómez (yellow card) 46'	Report	Viader (yellow card) 40'; Murphy (yellow card) 43'; Boyce 71' (pen.); Sousa (yellow card) 78'	Stadium: CHI Memorial Stadium; Attendance: 2,054; Referee: Edson Carvajal
	Penalties
	Bentley (penalty scored); Wessels (penalty scored); Vazquez (penalty scored); Ramos (penalty scored)		Carrera-García (penalty scored); Viader (penalty missed); Boyce (penalty scored); Murphy (penalty missed)

June 28, 2025 3	Forward Madison FC	1–0	One Knoxville SC	Madison, Wisconsin
6:00 PM CDT	McLaughlin 44' (pen.); Murphy (yellow card) 45+1'; Dietrich (yellow card) 84'	Report	Doyle (yellow card) 17'; Haugli (yellow card) 24'; Rosamilia (yellow card) 54'; Caputo (yellow card) 72'	Stadium: Breese Stevens Field; Attendance: 4,723; Referee: Lauren Aldrich

July 26, 2025 4	Birmingham Legion FC	2–1	Forward Madison FC	Birmingham, Alabama
7:00 PM CDT	Hamouda (yellow card) 25'; Saucedo (yellow card) 28', (goal) 81' (Pasher); Damus 30' (Shashoua); Paterson (yellow card) 75'	Report	Murphy (yellow card) 26'; Crull (yellow card) 53'; Angking 71' (Boyce)	Stadium: Protective Stadium; Attendance: 4,626; Referee: Elijio Arreguin

== Statistics ==
=== Appearances and goals ===
No.	Pos.	Nat.	Name	USL1 Season			U.S. Open Cup			USL Cup			Total		
No.	Pos.	Nat.	Name	Apps	Starts	Goals	Apps	Starts	Goals	Apps	Starts	Goals	Apps	Starts	Goals
1	GK	(Philippines)	Bernd Schipmann	19	19	0	0	0	0	3	3	0	22	22	0
2	DF	(Israel)	Michael Chilaka	22	17	0	0	0	0	4	3	0	26	20	0
3	MF	(Spain)	Damià Viader	28	15	0	0	0	0	3	2	0	31	17	0
4	DF	(Australia)	Mitch Osmond	5	5	0	0	0	0	2	2	0	7	7	0
5	DF	(United States)	Timmy Mehl	26	26	0	2	2	0	3	2	0	31	30	0
6	MF	(United States)	John Murphy	30	27	0	2	1	1	4	4	0	36	32	1
7	MF	(Germany)	Jackson Dietrich	6	3	0	2	1	0	2	1	0	10	5	0
8	MF	(United States)	Devin Boyce	23	13	1	2	1	0	4	2	1	29	16	2
9	FW	(United States)	Garrett McLaughlin	24	8	3	2	2	0	2	2	1	28	12	4
10	MF	(England)	Aiden Mesias	27	21	0	2	0	0	3	2	0	32	23	0
11	MF	(United States)	Christopher Garcia	25	14	1	1	0	0	4	3	0	30	17	1
12	GK	(United States)	Owen Finnerty	0	0	0	1	1	0	0	0	0	1	1	0
13	MF	(Nigeria)	Temi Ereku (Note: Joined Forward Madison FC after the team was eliminated from the 2025 U.S. Open Cup.)	5	2	0				1	1	0	6	3	0
14	DF	(United States)	Jason Ramos (Note: Joined Forward Madison FC after the team was eliminated from the 2025 USL Cup.)	12	11	0							12	11	0
16	DF	(Austria)	Jake Crull	29	29	1	2	2	0	4	4	0	35	35	1
17	FW	(United States)	Derek Gebhard	28	25	11	2	1	0	2	2	0	32	28	11
18	FW	(United States)	Adrien Graffin	3	0	0	0	0	0	1	0	0	4	0	0
19	FW	(Colombia)	Juan Galindrez	24	8	1	2	2	2	3	3	0	29	13	3
21	MF	(Mexico)	José Carrera-García	9	6	0	2	2	0	2	1	0	13	9	0
22	DF	(United States)	Eddie Munjoma	2	0	0	2	1	1	0	0	0	4	1	1
24	FW	(South Africa)	Nazeem Bartman	17	10	1	1	0	1	3	1	0	21	11	2
25	DF	(Democratic Republic of the Congo)	Ferrety Sousa	24	12	1	1	1	1	4	3	0	29	16	2
36	GK	(United States)	Wallis Lapsley	12	11	0	1	1	0	1	1	0	14	13	0
70	FW	(Brazil)	Lucca Dourado	22	18	8				2	0	0	24	18	8
77	FW	(Jamaica)	Nico Brown	30	22	1	2	2	0	4	2	0	36	26	1
80	MF	(Puerto Rico)	Isaac Angking	13	6	2				1	0	1	14	6	3
Players who left Forward Madison FC during the season
20	DF	(England)	Laurie Bell (Note: Left Forward Madison FC before the team entered the 2025 USL Cup.)	0	0	0	1	1	0				1	1	0
26	MF	(United States)	Riley Binns	0	0	0	0	0	0	0	0	0	0	0	0
99	FW	(United States)	Dean Boltz	5	2	0							5	2	0

=== Goalscorers ===
Rank	Position	Name	USL1 Season	U.S. Open Cup	USL Cup	Total
1	FW	(United States) Derek Gebhard	11	0	0	11
2	FW	(Brazil) Lucca Dourado	8	0	0	8
3	FW	(United States) Garrett McLaughlin	3	0	1	4
4	MF	(Puerto Rico) Isaac Angking	2	0	1	3
4	FW	(Colombia) Juan Galindrez	1	2	0	3
6	FW	(South Africa) Nazeem Bartman	1	1	0	2
6	MF	(United States) Devin Boyce	1	0	1	2
6	DF	(Democratic Republic of the Congo) Ferrety Sousa	1	1	0	2
9	MF	(Jamaica) Nico Brown	1	0	0	1
9	DF	(Austria) Jake Crull	1	0	0	1
9	MF	(United States) Christopher Garcia	1	0	0	1
9	DF	(United States) Eddie Munjoma	0	1	0	1
9	MF	(United States) John Murphy	0	1	0	1
Total			31	6	3	40

=== Assist scorers ===
Rank	Position	Name	USL1 Season	U.S. Open Cup	USL Cup	Total
1	MF	(United States) Devin Boyce	1	3	1	5
2	FW	(United States) Garrett McLaughlin	2	1	0	3
2	MF	(England) Aiden Mesias	3	0	0	3
4	MF	(Jamaica) Nico Brown	2	0	0	2
4	DF	(Israel) Michael Chilaka	2	0	0	2
4	FW	(Brazil) Lucca Dourado	2	0	0	2
4	DF	(United States) Timmy Mehl	1	1	0	2
4	MF	(Spain) Damià Viader	2	0	0	2
9	MF	(Puerto Rico) Isaac Angking	1	0	0	1
9	FW	(South Africa) Nazeem Bartman	1	0	0	1
9	DF	(Austria) Jake Crull	1	0	0	1
9	FW	(Colombia) Juan Galindrez	1	0	0	1
9	MF	(United States) Christopher Garcia	1	0	0	1
9	FW	(United States) Derek Gebhard	1	0	0	1
Total			21	5	1	27

=== Clean sheets ===
Rank	Name	USL1 Season	U.S. Open Cup	USL Cup	Total
1	(Philippines) Bernd Schipmann	6	0	1	7
2	(United States) Wallis Lapsley	1	0	0	1
Total		7	0	1	8

=== Disciplinary record ===
Rank	Position	Name	USL1 Season			U.S. Open Cup			USL Cup			Total		
Rank	Position	Name	Booked	(yellow card) (yellow-red card)	Sent off (straight red)	Booked	(yellow card) (yellow-red card)	Sent off (straight red)	Booked	(yellow card) (yellow-red card)	Sent off (straight red)	Booked	(yellow card) (yellow-red card)	Sent off (straight red)
1	MF	(United States) John Murphy	10	0	0	1	0	0	4	0	0	15	0	0
2	DF	(Democratic Republic of the Congo) Ferrety Sousa	3	1	1	0	0	0	2	0	0	5	1	1
3	MF	(United States) Devin Boyce	8	0	0	0	0	0	0	0	0	8	0	0
4	DF	(United States) Timmy Mehl	7	0	0	0	0	0	0	0	0	7	0	0
5	MF	(United States) Christopher Garcia	5	0	0	1	0	0	0	0	0	6	0	0
5	MF	(England) Aiden Mesias	5	0	0	1	0	0	0	0	0	6	0	0
7	MF	(Jamaica) Nico Brown	5	0	0	0	0	0	0	0	0	5	0	0
7	DF	(United States) Jason Ramos	5	0	0	0	0	0	0	0	0	5	0	0
9	DF	(Israel) Michael Chilaka	4	0	0	0	0	0	0	0	0	4	0	0
9	MF	(Spain) Damià Viader	3	0	0	0	0	0	1	0	0	4	0	0
11	MF	(Mexico) José Carrera-García	3	0	0	0	0	0	0	0	0	3	0	0
11	DF	(Austria) Jake Crull	2	0	0	0	0	0	1	0	0	3	0	0
13	MF	(Germany) Jackson Dietrich	1	0	0	0	0	0	1	0	0	2	0	0
13	GK	(United States) Wallis Lapsley	2	0	0	0	0	0	0	0	0	2	0	0
13	GK	(Philippines) Bernd Schipmann	2	0	0	0	0	0	0	0	0	2	0	0
16	MF	(Puerto Rico) Isaac Angking	1	0	0	0	0	0	0	0	0	1	0	0
16	FW	(South Africa) Nazeem Bartman	1	0	0	0	0	0	0	0	0	1	0	0
16	DF	(England) Laurie Bell	0	0	0	1	0	0	0	0	0	1	0	0
16	FW	(Brazil) Lucca Dourado	1	0	0	0	0	0	0	0	0	1	0	0
16	DF	(Nigeria) Temi Ereku	1	0	0	0	0	0	0	0	0	1	0	0
16	FW	(Colombia) Juan Galindrez	1	0	0	0	0	0	0	0	0	1	0	0
16	FW	(United States) Derek Gebhard	1	0	0	0	0	0	0	0	0	1	0	0
16	FW	(United States) Adrien Graffin	1	0	0	0	0	0	0	0	0	1	0	0
16	DF	(Australia) Mitch Osmond	1	0	0	0	0	0	0	0	0	1	0	0
Total			73	1	1	4	0	0	9	0	0	86	1	1

== Honors and awards ==
=== All-League Team ===
Team	Position	Player	Ref.
Second	FW	(United States) Derek Gebhard	

=== USL League One Weekly Awards ===
==== Goal of the Week ====
Week	Player	Opponent	Ref.
28	(Democratic Republic of the Congo) Ferrety Sousa	Richmond Kickers	
31	(United States) Derek Gebhard	Portland Hearts of Pine	

==== Team of the Week ====
Week	Position	Player	Ref.
4	MF	(United States) Derek Gebhard	
6	DF	(United States) Timmy Mehl	
7	DF	(Austria) Jake Crull	
7	Bench	(United States) Derek Gebhard	
9	DF	(United States) Timmy Mehl	
10	DF	(Austria) Jake Crull	
11	MF	(United States) Derek Gebhard	
12	GK	(United States) Wallis Lapsley	
19	DF	(Jamaica) Nico Brown	
19	FW	(Brazil) Lucca Dourado	
19	MF	(United States) Derek Gebhard	
19	Bench	(Austria) Jake Crull	
20	Bench	(United States) Christopher Garcia	
21/22	Coach	(United States) Matt Glaeser	
21/22	GK	(Philippines) Bernd Schipmann	
23	DF	(Israel) Michael Chilaka	
23	FW	(United States) Derek Gebhard	
24	DF	(United States) Christopher Garcia	
24	Bench	(Austria) Jake Crull	
26	FW	(Brazil) Lucca Dourado	
26	DF	(Spain) Damià Viader	
27	MF	(Puerto Rico) Isaac Angking	
27	Bench	(United States) Derek Gebhard	
28	GK	(Philippines) Bernd Schipmann	
30	FW	(United States) Derek Gebhard	
31	FW	(United States) Derek Gebhard	
32	Coach	(United States) Matt Glaeser	
32	DF	(Austria) Jake Crull	
32	Bench	(United States) Derek Gebhard	
