= 2024 Forward Madison FC season =

Season page for association football team

Forward Madison FC
2024 season
- Owner: Big Top Events
- Chief operating officer: Conor Caloia
- Head coach: Matt Glaeser
- Stadium: Breese Stevens Field
- USL League One: 3rd
- USL1 Playoffs: Semifinals
- U.S. Open Cup: Second round
- USL Cup: Runners-up
- Top goalscorer: League: Christian Chaney, Juan Galindrez (6); All: Christian Chaney (12)
- Highest home attendance: 4,856 (September 21 vs. SPK)
- Lowest home attendance: 3,346 (May 4 vs. GVL)
- Average home league attendance: 4,242
- Biggest win: 3 goals: CV 0–3 MAD (March 29), SPK 0–3 MAD (May 19), MAD 4–1 LEX (June 1)
- Biggest defeat: 2 goals: CFII 2–0 MAD (April 3, USOC); KNX 2–0 MAD (June 29, USL Cup)

The 2024 Forward Madison FC season was the sixth season in the soccer team's history, where they competed in USL League One of the third division of American soccer.

== Review ==
Forward Madison entered the season as a favorite to contend for the USL League One title, having returned the majority of their roster that reached the playoffs in 2023.

Derek Gebhard became the team's second player to reach 100 competitive appearances for the club in their June 29th USL Cup game at One Knoxville SC. He subsequently became the club's all-time appearance leader with his 101st appearance against Richmond Kickers on July 3rd.

Eric Leonard, who was the first player to reach 100 competitive appearances for Forward Madison, signed a one-day contract to retire with the club and was honored during Forward Madison's home game on July 24th against Central Valley Fuego FC.

Christian Chaney became the first player to reach 20 goals for the club on August 29th with an 85th minute goal against Union Omaha in the 2024 USL Cup.

Forward Madison clinched the Central Group of the 2024 USL Jägermeister Cup with their shootout win vs. Union Omaha on August 29th, moving on to the knockout round of the competition. They then won their semifinal match at home vs. Charlotte Independence on September 11th to move on to the final of the competition against Northern Colorado Hailstorm FC. It was the club's first ever final in any competition.

Forward Madison clinched a spot in the 2024 USL League One playoffs following their 2–0 home victory over Spokane Velocity FC on September 21st.

Head coach Matt Glaeser reached his 100th competitive match leading Forward Madison in the club's regular season finale at Northern Colorado Hailstorm FC.

== Club ==
=== Roster ===
No.	Pos.	Nat.	Name	Date of birth (age)	Since	On loan from
1	GK	(Philippines)	Bernd Schipmann	July 5, 1994 (age 32)	2023	
2	DF	(Israel)	Michael Chilaka	February 5, 2000 (age 26)	2024	
4	DF	(Australia)	Mitch Osmond	March 11, 1994 (age 32)	2022	
5	DF	(United States)	Timmy Mehl	August 31, 1995 (age 31)	2023	
6	MF	(United States)	John Murphy	April 19, 2000 (age 26)	2024	
7	MF	(United States)	Wolfgang Prentice	April 25, 2000 (age 26)	2024	Oakland Roots SC
8	MF	(United States)	Devin Boyce	September 8, 1996 (age 30)	2024	
9	FW	(United States)	Christian Chaney	September 8, 1994 (age 32)	2023	
10	MF	(England)	Aiden Mesias	October 23, 1999 (age 27)	2023	
11	FW	(Senegal)	Cherif Dieye	November 11, 1997 (age 28)	2024	
12	FW	(United States)	Garrett McLaughlin	November 10, 1997 (age 29)	2024	
14	FW	(Venezuela)	Mauro Cichero	August 1, 1995 (age 31)	2023	
16	DF	(Austria)	Jake Crull	October 3, 1997 (age 29)	2023	
17	FW	(United States)	Derek Gebhard	October 15, 1995 (age 31)	2021	
19	FW	(Colombia)	Juan Galindrez	July 4, 1994 (age 32)	2024	
20	FW	(Uruguay)	Agustín Dávila	January 5, 1999 (age 27)	2024	
21	MF	(United States)	Jimmie Villalobos	July 21, 1995 (age 31)	2024	One Knoxville SC
22	DF	(United States)	Stephen Payne	June 16, 1997 (age 29)	2023	
24	FW	(South Africa)	Nazeem Bartman	August 13, 1993 (age 33)	2022	
25	DF	(Democratic Republic of the Congo)	Ferrety Sousa	December 25, 1990 (age 35)	2024	
99	GK	(United States)	Martin Sanchez	July 4, 2000 (age 26)	2023	

=== Coaching staff ===
Name	Position
(United States) Matt Glaeser	Head coach and technical director
(United States) Neil Hlavaty	Assistant coach
(United States) Jim Launder	Assistant coach
(United States) John Pascarella	Assistant coach
(United States) Aaron Hohlbein	Assistant coach

=== Front office staff ===
Name	Position
(United States) Conor Caloia	Chief operating officer
(United States) Vern Stenman	President
(United States) Keith Tiemeyer	Director of Soccer Operations & Development

== Transfers ==
=== Transfers in ===
Date from	Position	Player	Last team	Type	Ref.
December 11, 2023	FW	(Senegal) Cherif Dieye	Central Valley Fuego FC	Free transfer	
January 4, 2024	MF	(United States) Devin Boyce	Greenville Triumph SC	Free transfer	
January 10, 2024	DF	(Israel) Michael Chilaka	San Diego Loyal SC	Free transfer	
January 12, 2024	FW	(Colombia) Juan Galindrez	Rio Grande Valley FC Toros	Free transfer	
January 17, 2024	MF	(United States) John Murphy	South Georgia Tormenta FC	Free transfer	
January 19, 2024	MF	(United States) Wolfgang Prentice	Oakland Roots SC	Loan	
January 24, 2024	MF	(United States) Jimmie Villalobos	One Knoxville SC	Loan	
January 26, 2024	DF	(Democratic Republic of the Congo) Ferrety Sousa	Sacramento Republic FC	Free transfer	
January 31, 2024	FW	(Uruguay) Agustín Dávila	(Uruguay) Boston River	Free transfer	
March 14, 2024	DF	(United States) Jake Fuderer	Chicago Fire FC II	Free transfer	
June 25, 2024	FW	(United States) Garrett McLaughlin	North Carolina FC	Paid transfer	

=== Transfers out ===
Date from	Position	Player	To	Type	Ref.
November 6, 2023	MF	(United States) Julio Benitez	Real Salt Lake	End of loan	
November 6, 2023	DF	(United States) Jason Ramos	Minnesota United FC 2	End of loan	
December 1, 2023	MF	(United States) Eric Conerty		Contract expired	
December 1, 2023	FW	(England) Francis Jno-Baptiste		Contract expired	
December 1, 2023	MF	(United States) Ozzie Ramos		Contract expired	
December 29, 2023	MF	(United States) Pierre da Silva	(Peru) Universidad César Vallejo	Free transfer	
January 4, 2024	FW	(England) Jayden Onen	Lexington SC	Free transfer	
January 10, 2024	DF	(United States) Sam Brotherton		Retired	
January 10, 2024	DF	(United States) Robert Screen	Chattanooga FC	Free transfer	
January 25, 2024	MF	(United States) Andrew Wheeler-Omiunu		Retired	
February 22, 2024	MF	(United States) Isidro Martinez	Northern Colorado Hailstorm FC	Free transfer	
February 22, 2024	MF	(United States) Tino Vasquez	River Light FC	Free transfer	
April 8, 2024	DF	(United States) Jake Fuderer		Contract expired	

== Exhibitions ==
February 16, 2024 Preseason 1	Minnesota United FC 2	v	Forward Madison FC	Blaine, Minnesota
10:00 AM CST				Stadium: National Sports Center
Note: Closed to the public. Score and stats were not announced.

February 23, 2024 Preseason 2	Chicago Fire FC II	1–3	Forward Madison FC	Bridgeview, Illinois
10:00 AM CST		Report	Crull; Sousa; Trialist	Stadium: Bridgeview Sports Dome
Note: Closed to the public.

March 1, 2024 Preseason 3	Indy Eleven	v	Forward Madison FC	Westfield, Indiana
2:00 PM EST				Stadium: Grand Park Sports Campus
Note: Cancelled in lieu of a multi-team training session between Indy Eleven, Forward Madison FC, and Detroit City FC.

March 9, 2024 Preseason 4	St. Louis City 2	v	Forward Madison FC	St. Louis, Missouri
12:00 PM CST				Stadium: Washington University Orthopedics High Performance Center
Note: Closed to the public. Score and stats were not announced.

April 20, 2024 Midseason 1	Forward Madison FC	1–1 (5–6 p)	Wisconsin Badgers	Madison, Wisconsin
5:00 PM CDT	Dávila (yellow card) 20', (goal) 68'; Sousa (yellow card) 54'; Murphy (yellow card) 60'	Report	(yellow card) 60'; 75'	Stadium: Breese Stevens Field
	Penalties
	Gebhard (penalty scored); Crull (penalty scored); Bartman (penalty scored); Galindrez (penalty missed); Dieye (penalty scored); Mehl (penalty scored); Prentice (penalty missed)		Crockford (penalty scored); Baldvinsson (penalty scored); Zachemski (penalty scored); Hrvojevic (penalty scored); Andrews (penalty missed); #15 (penalty scored); Fleming (penalty scored)

June 25, 2024 Midseason 2	Forward Madison FC (United States)	1–2	(Mexico) C.D. Tapatío	Madison, Wisconsin
7:00 PM CDT	Murphy (yellow card) 42'; Dieye (yellow card) 43'; Martínez 49' (o.g.); Boyce (yellow card) 75'	Report	Rey 21'; Palma; Guajardo (yellow card) 29'; Sanchez (yellow card) 47'	Stadium: Breese Stevens Field

September 14, 2024 Midseason 3	Forward Madison FC	5–1	Chicago House AC	Madison, Wisconsin
6:00 PM CDT	McLaughlin 15' (Dávila), 36'; Dávila (yellow card) 33'; Trialist #33 53' (Trialist #26); Trialist #38 66' (Trialist #33), 88'; Trialist #26 (yellow card) 87'	Report	Avalos 9'; Waddington (yellow card) 57'; Angeles (yellow card) 59'; Dilworth (yellow card) 85'	Stadium: Breese Stevens Field
Note: Moved from its original date of July 24th to accommodate the rescheduling of Forward Madison FC's abandoned July 13th match vs. Central Valley Fuego FC.

== Competitions ==
=== Overview ===
Competition	First match	Last match	Starting round	Final position	Record							
Competition	First match	Last match	Starting round	Final position	Pld	W	D	L	GF	GA	GD	Win %
USL League One	March 16, 2024	October 26, 2024	Matchday 1	3rd	22	10	9	3	35	18	+17	45.45
USL1 Playoffs	November 2, 2024	November 9, 2024	Quarterfinals	Semifinals	2	1	1	0	2	0	+2	50.00
U.S. Open Cup	March 19, 2024	April 3, 2024	First round	Second round	2	1	0	1	2	2	+0	50.00
USL Cup	April 28, 2024	September 28, 2024	Group stage	Runners-up	10	6	2	2	13	10	+3	60.00
Total					36	18	12	6	52	30	+22	50.00

Source: Competitions

=== USL League One ===
==== Standings ====
Pos	Team	Pld	W	L	T	GF	GA	GD	Pts	Qualification
1	(Nebraska) Union Omaha (C, S)	22	15	4	3	47	24	+23	48	Playoffs
2	Northern Colorado Hailstorm FC	22	12	5	5	34	18	+16	41	Playoffs
3	(Wisconsin) Forward Madison FC	22	10	3	9	35	18	+17	39	Playoffs
4	(South Carolina) Greenville Triumph SC	22	11	7	4	39	28	+11	37	Playoffs
5	(Tennessee) One Knoxville SC	22	9	5	8	23	16	+7	35	Playoffs

Source: USL League One
Rules for classification: 1) points; 2) total wins; 3) total goal differential; 4) total goals scored; 5) points earned against top four Conference finishers; 6) disciplinary points; 7) drawing of lots.
(C) Champions; (S) Players' Shield winner

==== Results summary ====
Overall								Home						Away					
Pld	W	D	L	GF	GA	GD	Pts	W	D	L	GF	GA	GD	W	D	L	GF	GA	GD
22	10	9	3	35	18	+17	39	6	4	1	17	8	+9	4	5	2	18	10	+8

Source: USL League One

==== Results by round ====
Round	1	2	3	4	5	6	7	8	9	10	11	12	13	14	15	16	17	18	19	20	21	22
Stadium	A	A	A	H	H	A	H	H	H	A	H	H	A	H	A	A	H	A	A	H	H	A
Result	D	D	W	D	W	W	W	D	W	L	W	L	D	D	D	W	W	D	W	W	D	L
Position	5	9	6	6	5	4	2	3	2	3	3	4	5	5	6	4	2	2	2	2	2	3
Points	1	2	5	6	9	12	15	16	19	19	22	22	23	24	25	28	31	32	35	38	39	39

Source: USL League One
H = Home; A = Away; W = Win; D = Draw; L = Loss

==== Matches ====
March 16, 2024 1	South Georgia Tormenta FC	1–1	Forward Madison FC	Statesboro, Georgia
7:30 PM EDT	Fonseca (yellow card) 90+2'; Watson 90+6'; Spengler (yellow card) 90+10'	Report	Galindrez (yellow card) 39'; Boyce 69' (Bartman), (yellow card) 90+6'; Schipmann (yellow card) 87'	Stadium: Optim Sports Medicine Field at Tormenta Stadium; Attendance: 940; Referee: Adam Brzozowiec

March 23, 2024 2	Greenville Triumph SC	0–0	Forward Madison FC	Greenville, South Carolina
7:00 PM EDT	Corvino (yellow card) 38'; Polak (yellow card) 61'; Castro (yellow card) 66'	Report	Murphy (yellow card) 9'; Mehl (yellow card) 33'; Chaney (yellow card) 55'; Chilaka (yellow card) 90+4'	Stadium: Paladin Stadium; Attendance: 1,683; Referee: Wes Caouette

March 29, 2024 3	Central Valley Fuego FC	0–3	Forward Madison FC	Fresno, California
7:00 PM PDT	John-Brown (yellow card) 17'; Vasquez (yellow card) 20'; Dabo (yellow card) 40'; Mendiola (yellow card) 53'; Carrera-García (yellow card) 56' (yellow-red card) 61'	Report	Gebhard (yellow card) 11', (goal) 28'; Murphy 42' (Gebhard); Chilaka (yellow card) 44'; Boyce 45+4' (Galindrez)	Stadium: Fresno State Soccer Stadium; Attendance: 740; Referee: Mark Verso

April 13, 2024 4	Forward Madison FC	2–2	Richmond Kickers	Madison, Wisconsin
6:00 PM CDT	Gebhard 28' (Boyce); Boyce (yellow card) 46'; Mehl (yellow card) 54' (yellow-red card) 86'; Dávila 72' (Prentice); Murphy (yellow card) 77'	Report	Schenfeld 45+7' (Morán), (yellow card) 77'; Billhardt 64' (Bosua); Simmonds (yellow card) 88'; Fitch (yellow card) 90+9'	Stadium: Breese Stevens Field; Attendance: 3,821; Referee: Alex Beehler

May 4, 2024 5	Forward Madison FC	3–2	Greenville Triumph SC	Madison, Wisconsin
6:00 PM CDT	Prentice 1' (Bartman); Boyce (yellow card) 15'; Chaney 55' (pen.); Chilaka (yellow card) 66'; Osmond (yellow card) 72'; Galindrez 90+2' (Dieye)	Report	Smith 44' (pen.); Castro 53' (MacKinnon); Zakowski (yellow card) 58'; Polak (yellow card) 69'; Lee (yellow card) 73'	Stadium: Breese Stevens Field; Attendance: 3,346; Referee: Joe Surgan

May 8, 2024	One Knoxville SC	Postponed	Forward Madison FC	Knoxville, Tennessee
6:30 PM EDT				Stadium: Regal Stadium
Note: Postponed due to inclement weather in the Knoxville area. Match rescheduled for October 1st.

May 19, 2024 6	Spokane Velocity FC	0–3	Forward Madison FC	Spokane, Washington
3:00 PM PDT	Smith (yellow card) 17'	Report	Villalobos 22' (Chaney); Boyce 44' (Prentice); Mesias 63' (Chaney); Crull (yellow card) 72'; Schipmann (yellow card) 90+1'	Stadium: One Spokane Stadium; Attendance: 4,047; Referee: Christopher Calderon

June 1, 2024 7	Forward Madison FC	4–1	Lexington SC	Madison, Wisconsin
5:00 PM CDT	Chaney 3' (Gebhard), 20'; Mesias 9'; Mehl (yellow card) 50'; Schipmann (yellow card) 84'; Murphy 90+2' (Galindrez), (yellow card) 90+3'	Report	Diouf (yellow card) 26'; Caputo (yellow card) 31'; Balogun (yellow card) 45+5', (goal) 56' (pen.); Ackon (yellow card) 59'	Stadium: Breese Stevens Field; Attendance: 4,556; Referee: Lukasz Jozefecki

June 15, 2024 8	Forward Madison FC	0–0	South Georgia Tormenta FC	Madison, Wisconsin
2:00 PM CDT		Report	Ramos (yellow card) 81'; Spengler (yellow card) 83'	Stadium: Breese Stevens Field; Attendance: 4,621; Referee: Joe Surgan

June 20, 2024 9	Forward Madison FC	2–0	Union Omaha	Madison, Wisconsin
7:00 PM CDT	Chaney 40' (pen.); Murphy (yellow card) 84'; Prentice 90+5', (yellow card) 90+6'	Report	Mastrantonio (yellow card) 23'; PC (yellow card) 39'; Gallardo (yellow card) 42'; Malone (yellow card) 83'	Stadium: Breese Stevens Field; Attendance: 4,076; Referee: Atahan Yaya

July 3, 2024 10	Richmond Kickers	2–1	Forward Madison FC	Richmond, Virginia
8:00 PM EDT	Terzaghi 22' (Billhardt); Morán (yellow card) 81'; O'Dwyer (yellow card) 90+3', (goal) 90+11' (Vinyals); Billhardt (yellow card) 90+6'	Report	Boyce (yellow card) 49'; Mesias (yellow card) 65'; Crull (yellow card) 87'; Galindrez 90' (Dávila), (yellow card) 90+1'; Mehl (yellow card) 90+10'	Stadium: City Stadium; Attendance: 5,574; Referee: Rafael Santos

July 13, 2024	Forward Madison FC	Abandoned	Central Valley Fuego FC	Madison, Wisconsin
7:00 PM CDT	Chaney 22'	Report	Crull 35' (o.g.)	Stadium: Breese Stevens Field; Referee: Mario Maric
Note: Abandoned in the 36th minute due to inclement weather in Madison. Match rescheduled for July 24th.

July 24, 2024 11	Forward Madison FC	2–1	Central Valley Fuego FC	Madison, Wisconsin
7:00 PM CDT	Chaney 38' (Crull), (yellow card) 90+2'; Payne (yellow card) 54'; Boyce 66' (Prentice); Sousa (yellow card) 88'	Report	Carrera-García (yellow card) 30'; Mariona 50' (Midence); Cromwell (yellow card) 57' (yellow-red card) 78'; Torr (yellow card) 75' (yellow-red card) 90+3'; Yaya (yellow card) 90+1'; Midence (yellow card) 90+7'	Stadium: Breese Stevens Field; Attendance: 3,573; Referee: Mario Maric
Note: Replay of abandoned match on July 13th.

July 27, 2024 12	Forward Madison FC	0–1	Northern Colorado Hailstorm FC	Madison, Wisconsin
7:00 PM CDT	Chilaka (yellow card) 19'; Mesias (yellow card) 35'	Report	King 2' (Rendón)	Stadium: Breese Stevens Field; Attendance: 4,336; Referee: Erick Lezama

August 3, 2024 13	Union Omaha	2–2	Forward Madison FC	Papillion, Nebraska
7:00 PM CDT	Mastrantonio (yellow card) 12'; Dos Santos (yellow card) 53', (goal) 63' (Gallardo); Dolabella (yellow card) 60', (goal) 71' (Schneider); Gómez (yellow card) 63'; Gallardo (yellow card) 89'	Report	Villalobos (yellow card) 37'; Galindrez 47' (McLaughlin); Chilaka (yellow card) 64'; Crull 90+5' (Prentice); Murphy (yellow card) 90+9'; Chaney (yellow card) 90+9'	Stadium: Werner Park; Attendance: 3,265; Referee: Aleksandar Zhelyazkov

August 14, 2024 14	Forward Madison FC	0–0	Charlotte Independence	Madison, Wisconsin
7:00 PM CDT	Villalobos (yellow card) 20'; Murphy (yellow card) 53'; Chaney (yellow card) 73'; Sousa (yellow card) 90+5'	Report	Belmar (yellow card) 90+5'	Stadium: Breese Stevens Field; Attendance: 4,232; Referee: Rafael Santos

August 24, 2024 15	Lexington SC	0–0	Forward Madison FC	Georgetown, Kentucky
7:00 PM EDT	Corrales (yellow card) 45+1'; Méndez (yellow card) 45+5'; Caputo (yellow card) 66'	Report	McLaughlin (yellow card) 53'; Chilaka (yellow card) 54'; Cichero (red card) 80'; Boyce (yellow card) 90+3'	Stadium: Toyota Stadium; Attendance: 1,098; Referee: Amin Hadzic

September 7, 2024 16	Chattanooga Red Wolves SC	1–3	Forward Madison FC	East Ridge, Tennessee
7:30 PM EDT	Marsh; Lukic (yellow card) 17'; Roberts (yellow card) 29'; Jnohope (yellow card) 34'	Report	Boyce (yellow card) 35'; Galindrez 45' (Gebhard); Sousa (yellow card) 60'; Prentice 65' (Villalobos); Mesias 72' (Payne); Chaney (yellow card) 90+3'	Stadium: CHI Memorial Stadium; Attendance: 2,188; Referee: Igor Bych

September 21, 2024 17	Forward Madison FC	2–0	Spokane Velocity FC	Madison, Wisconsin
6:00 PM CDT	Murphy 16' (Gebhard); Mehl (yellow card) 45+2'; Prentice (yellow card) 53'; Gebhard; Cichero (yellow card) 90'	Report	Dolling (yellow card) 42'; Akale (yellow card) 59' (yellow-red card) 59'; J. Gil (yellow card) 61'; Lage (yellow card) 75'	Stadium: Breese Stevens Field; Attendance: 4,856; Referee: Fevzi Demirhan
Note: Delayed from original start time of 5:00 PM CDT by weather.

October 1, 2024 18	One Knoxville SC	1–1	Forward Madison FC	Knoxville, Tennessee
6:30 PM EDT	Skelton (yellow card) 33'; Thomas (yellow card) 44'; Ross 51' (Tekiela); Ballard (yellow card) 56'; Haugli (yellow card) 78'	Report	Dieye (yellow card) 26'; Galindrez (yellow card) 28', (goal) 40'; Sousa (yellow card) 48'	Stadium: Regal Stadium; Attendance: 1,310; Referee: Aleksandar Zhelyazkov
Note: Makeup of postponed match on May 8th.

October 4, 2024 19	Charlotte Independence	2–4	Forward Madison FC	Charlotte, North Carolina
7:30 PM EDT	Dutey (yellow card) 6'; Ngah 19'; Álvarez (yellow card) 45+4'; Johnson (yellow card) 56'; Ndiaye (yellow card) 65'; Obregón 89' (Corea)	Report	Chilaka 39' (Crull); Boyce 45+4'; Galindrez 55' (Gebhard); Dávila 82' (Chaney)	Stadium: American Legion Memorial Stadium; Attendance: 612; Referee: Mario Maric

October 12, 2024 20	Forward Madison FC	2–1	Chattanooga Red Wolves SC	Madison, Wisconsin
6:00 PM CDT	Mesias 52'; Murphy (yellow card) 72'; Chaney 90+2' (pen.), (yellow card) 90+5'; Boyce (yellow card) 90+9'; Dieye (yellow card) 90+11'	Report	P. Hernández (yellow card) 16'; Lukic (yellow card) 21'; O. Hernandez (yellow card) 37'; Mensah (yellow card) 49', (goal) 66' (Coutinho); Knapp (yellow card) 84'	Stadium: Breese Stevens Field; Attendance: 4,440; Referee: Atahan Yaya
Note: Delayed from original start time of 5:00 PM CDT by weather.

October 19, 2024 21	Forward Madison FC	0–0	One Knoxville SC	Madison, Wisconsin
6:00 PM CDT	Boyce (yellow card) 48'; Prentice (yellow card) 63'; Cichero (yellow card) 84'; Dieye (yellow card) 90+4'	Report	Calixtro (yellow card) 32'	Stadium: Breese Stevens Field; Attendance: 4,807; Referee: Erick Lezama

October 26, 2024 22	Northern Colorado Hailstorm FC	1–0	Forward Madison FC	Windsor, Colorado
8:00 PM MDT	Martinez (yellow card) 19'; Hoard (yellow card) 36'; Rendón 82' (Gill); Powder (yellow card) 85'	Report	Murphy (yellow card) 24'; Chilaka (yellow card) 89'	Stadium: 4Rivers Equipment Stadium; Attendance: 2,236; Referee: Olvin Oliva

==== USL League One Playoffs ====
Quarterfinals; November 2–3
1	Union Omaha	1
8	Richmond Kickers	0
4	Greenville Triumph SC	2
5	One Knoxville SC	1
2	Northern Colorado Hailstorm FC	0
7	Spokane Velocity FC	3
3	Forward Madison FC	2
6	Charlotte Independence	0

Semifinals; November 9
1	Union Omaha	2
4	Greenville Triumph SC	1
7	Spokane Velocity FC (p)	0 (5)
3	Forward Madison FC	0 (4)

Final; November 17
1	Union Omaha	3
7	Spokane Velocity FC	0

Forward Madison entered the 2024 USL League One Playoffs as the third seed.

November 2, 2024 Quarterfinals	Forward Madison FC	2–0	Charlotte Independence	Madison, Wisconsin
6:00 PM CDT	Gebhard 38' (Boyce), (yellow card) 44'; Villalobos (yellow card) 43'; Boyce 90+2' (pen.)	Report	Ciss (yellow card) 19'; Dimick (yellow card) 44'; Sorenson (yellow card) 90+1'	Stadium: Breese Stevens Field; Attendance: 3,953; Referee: Calin Radosav; Assistant referees: Chris Schurfranz, Austin Holt; Fourth official: Igor Bych

November 9, 2024 Semifinals	Forward Madison FC	0–0 (a.e.t.) (4–5 p)	Spokane Velocity FC	Madison, Wisconsin
6:00 PM CDT	Chaney (yellow card) 115'	Report	Dolling (yellow card) 71'; Lage (yellow card) 88'; Jome (yellow card) 90+2'	Stadium: Breese Stevens Field; Attendance: 4,495; Referee: Thomas Snyder; Assistant referees: Matt Trotter, Amilcar Sicaju; Fourth official: Ricardo Fierro
	Penalties
	Boyce (penalty scored); McLaughlin (penalty scored); Dieye (penalty missed); Villalobos (penalty scored); Chaney (penalty scored)		Dolling (penalty scored); Peláez (penalty scored); González (penalty scored); Lewis (penalty scored); Fernandez (penalty scored)

=== U.S. Open Cup ===
As an independent member of USL League One, Forward Madison FC participated in the 2024 U.S. Open Cup. They entered the competition in the first round, taking place between March 19-21, 2024.

March 19, 2024 First round	Forward Madison FC (Wisconsin)	2–0	(Minnesota) Duluth FC	Madison, Wisconsin
6:00 PM CDT	Chaney 9' (Fuderer), 53' (Sousa); Sousa (yellow card) 70'	Report	Pickering (yellow card) 20'; Nakhid (yellow card) 86'	Stadium: Breese Stevens Field; Attendance: 1,240; Referee: Peter Bernardy

April 3, 2024 Second round	Chicago Fire FC II (Illinois)	2–0	(Wisconsin) Forward Madison FC	Bridgeview, Illinois
7:00 PM CDT	Poręba 11'; Osorio (yellow card) 23'; Shokalook (yellow card) 79', (goal) 90'; Oregel (yellow card) 84'; Glasgow (yellow card) 90+5'	Report	Mehl (yellow card) 68'; Sousa (yellow card) 74'; Galindrez (yellow card) 90+5'	Stadium: SeatGeek Stadium; Attendance: 198; Referee: Carlos Rodriguez

=== USL Jägermeister Cup ===
2024 featured the first edition of the USL Jägermeister Cup, USL League One's first intra-league cup competition. Each team played the other three teams in their group twice, home and away, and played two teams in other groups. If a game is tied at the end of regulation, a penalty kick shootout determined who gets an extra point in the standings. The top team from each group, plus the team with the most goals scored of the teams that did not win their group, advanced to a knockout round.

==== Standings — Central Group ====
Pos	Team	Pld	W	PKW	PKL	L	GF	GA	GD	Pts	Qualification
1	Forward Madison FC	8	5	1	0	2	10	8	+2	17	Advanced to knockout stage
2	One Knoxville SC	8	4	1	1	2	8	7	+1	15	
3	Lexington SC	8	3	2	1	2	10	10	0	14	
4	Chattanooga Red Wolves SC	8	1	1	1	5	10	15	−5	6	

Source: USL League One
Rules for classification: 1) points; 2) goals for in cup match play (only for determining wild card); 3) head-to-head points earned in small group play; 4) total wins in small group play; 5) total wins in all cup matches; 6) goals for in small group play; 7) goals for in cup match play; 8) goals assisted in cup match play; 9) goal differential in cup match play; 10) disciplinary points; 11) coin toss.

==== Results summary ====
Overall									Home							Away						
Pld	W	SOW	SOL	L	GF	GA	GD	Pts	W	SOW	SOL	L	GF	GA	GD	W	SOW	SOL	L	GF	GA	GD
8	5	1	0	2	10	8	+2	17	3	1	0	0	7	4	+3	2	0	0	2	3	4	−1

Source: USL League One

==== Results by round ====
Round	1	2	3	4	5	6	7	8
Stadium	A	A	H	A	A	H	H	H
Result	L	W	W	W	L	W	W	SW
Position	4	3	2	1	3	1	1	1
Points	0	3	6	9	9	12	15	17

Source: USL League One
H = Home; A = Away; W = Win; SW = Shootout win; SL = Shootout loss; L = Loss

==== Group stage matches ====
April 28, 2024 1	Lexington SC	1–0	Forward Madison FC	Georgetown, Kentucky
4:00 PM EDT	Onen (yellow card) 45+4'; Robertson (red card) 56'; Yankam (yellow card) 79' (yellow-red card) 88'; Fox 90+4' (Corrales)	Report	Mesias (yellow card) 21'; Dávila (yellow card) 21'; Chilaka (yellow card) 28'; Boyce (yellow card) 53'; Crull (yellow card) 90+3'	Stadium: Toyota Stadium; Attendance: 1,295; Referee: Nickrod Fateh

May 11, 2024 2	Charlotte Independence	1–2	Forward Madison FC	Charlotte, North Carolina
1:00 PM EDT	Sorenson (yellow card) 42'; Obregón 64'; Djedje (yellow card) 75'	Report	Chaney 2' (Crull); Crull (yellow card) 71'; Gebhard 79' (Chaney); Murphy (yellow card) 85'; Mesias (yellow card) 90+1'	Stadium: American Legion Memorial Stadium; Attendance: 798; Referee: Rafael Santos

May 25, 2024 3	Forward Madison FC	1–0	One Knoxville SC	Madison, Wisconsin
6:00 PM CDT	Gebhard 19'; Mehl (yellow card) 46'; Osmond (yellow card) 49'; Sousa (yellow card) 55'; Schipmann (yellow card) 78'; Chaney (yellow card) 84'	Report	Calixtro (yellow card) 37'	Stadium: Breese Stevens Field; Attendance: 4,229; Referee: Amin Hadzic

June 8, 2024 4	Chattanooga Red Wolves SC	0–1	Forward Madison FC	East Ridge, Tennessee
7:30 PM EDT	Gómez (yellow card) 17'; O. Hernandez (yellow card) 21'; Roberts (yellow card) 70'	Report	Boyce (yellow card) 27'; Galindrez 43' (Sousa); Prentice (yellow card) 71'; Crull (yellow card) 90+4'; Payne (yellow card) 90+6'	Stadium: CHI Memorial Stadium; Attendance: 2,403; Referee: Stearne Briem

June 29, 2024 5	One Knoxville SC	2–0	Forward Madison FC	Knoxville, Tennessee
7:30 PM EDT	Haugli (yellow card) 20'; Crisler (yellow card) 54'; Ross 58' (Ritchie); Ritchie 66'; Machell (yellow card) 90+10'	Report	Villalobos (yellow card) 4'; McLaughlin (yellow card) 57'; Boyce (yellow card) 66'; Murphy (yellow card) 90+10'	Stadium: Regal Stadium; Attendance: 1,696; Referee: Edson Carvajal

July 20, 2024 6	Forward Madison FC	1–0	Lexington SC	Madison, Wisconsin
7:00 PM CDT	Prentice 77' (Osmond), (yellow card) 90+3'; Chaney (yellow card) 90+5'	Report	Uche (yellow card) 40'	Stadium: Breese Stevens Field; Attendance: 3,571; Referee: Ryan Shanklin

August 10, 2024 7	Forward Madison FC	2–1	Chattanooga Red Wolves SC	Madison, Wisconsin
7:00 PM CDT	McLaughlin 20'; Sousa (yellow card) 22'; Boyce 69'; Schipmann (yellow card) 90+7'; Prentice (yellow card) 90+9'	Report	Coutinho 14' (Malango); Ualefi (yellow card) 38'; Marsh (yellow card) 45'; Fernandes (yellow card) 67'; Folla (yellow card) 68'; Green (yellow card) 90+9'	Stadium: Breese Stevens Field; Attendance: 4,631; Referee: John Matto

August 29, 2024 8	Forward Madison FC	3–3 (5–4 p)	Union Omaha	Madison, Wisconsin
7:00 PM CDT	Prentice 2' (Mehl), (yellow card) 64'; Galindrez (yellow card) 16'; Milanese 23' (o.g.); Chaney (yellow card) 45+4', (goal) 85' (Villalobos); Dieye (yellow card) 81'	Report	Lewis 29'; Mastrantonio (yellow card) 45+2'; Kunga (yellow card) 65'; Dolabella 71' (Jiba); Dos Santos 73'; Gallardo (yellow card) 80'; Gómez (yellow card) 87'	Stadium: Breese Stevens Field; Attendance: 3,676; Referee: Edson Carvajal
	Penalties
	Boyce (penalty scored); McLaughlin (penalty scored); Gebhard (penalty scored); Dieye (penalty scored); Chaney (penalty scored)		Dolabella (penalty scored); Gallardo (penalty scored); Milanese (penalty missed); Gómez (penalty scored); Rodríguez (penalty scored)

==== Knockout stage ====
Semifinals; September 11
W1	Northern Colorado Hailstorm FC	2
WC	Union Omaha	0
C1	Forward Madison FC	2
E1	Charlotte Independence	1

Final; September 28
W1	Northern Colorado Hailstorm FC	1(5)
C1	Forward Madison FC	1(4)

Forward Madison entered the USL Cup knockout stage as the second seed, having won the Central Group, and earning fewer points than West Group winner Northern Colorado Hailstorm FC and more points than East Group winner Charlotte Independence.

==== Knockout stage matches ====
September 11, 2024 Semifinals	Forward Madison FC	2–1	Charlotte Independence	Madison, Wisconsin
6:00 PM CDT	Osmond 34', (yellow card) 65'; Chaney 47', (yellow card) 49' (yellow-red card) 67'; Villalobos (yellow card) 90+8'	Report	Álvarez (yellow card) 33', (goal) 45+2' (Johnson); Ndiaye (red card) 82'; Ibarra (yellow card) 90'; Akyeampong (yellow card) 90+4'	Stadium: Breese Stevens Field; Attendance: 1,483; Referee: Joshua Encarnación; Assistant referees: Tom Felice, Zeno Cho; Fourth official: Jeremy Scheer

September 28, 2024 Final	Northern Colorado Hailstorm FC	1–1 (5–4 p)	Forward Madison FC	Windsor, Colorado
7:00 PM MDT	Rendón 12'; Gill (yellow card) 38'; Opara (yellow card) 70'	Report	Chaney 9'; Galindrez (yellow card) 88'	Stadium: 4Rivers Equipment Stadium; Attendance: 3,550; Referee: Greg Dopka; Assistant referees: Nicholas Balcer, Ben Rigel; Fourth official: Eric Tattersall; Fifth official: Matt Trotter
	Penalties
	Langlois (penalty scored); Hernández (penalty scored); Powder (penalty scored); García (penalty scored); Hoard (penalty scored)		Boyce (penalty scored); McLaughlin (penalty scored); Mesias (penalty scored); Crull (penalty missed); Chaney (penalty scored)

== Statistics ==
=== Appearances and goals ===
No.	Pos.	Nat.	Name	USL1 Season			USL1 Playoffs			U.S. Open Cup			USL Cup			Total		
No.	Pos.	Nat.	Name	Apps	Starts	Goals	Apps	Starts	Goals	Apps	Starts	Goals	Apps	Starts	Goals	Apps	Starts	Goals
1	GK	(Philippines)	Bernd Schipmann	22	22	0	2	2	0	0	0	0	10	10	0	33	33	0
2	DF	(Israel)	Michael Chilaka	17	13	1	2	2	0	2	2	0	7	4	0	27	20	1
4	DF	(Australia)	Mitch Osmond	19	19	0	2	2	0	0	0	0	8	8	1	28	28	1
5	DF	(United States)	Timmy Mehl	17	17	0	1	0	0	1	1	0	8	8	0	26	26	0
6	MF	(United States)	John Murphy	19	13	3	2	2	0	2	1	0	9	5	0	31	20	3
7	MF	(United States)	Wolfgang Prentice	21	5	3	2	0	0	2	2	0	9	8	2	33	15	5
8	MF	(United States)	Devin Boyce	20	19	5	2	2	1	1	0	0	10	9	1	32	29	7
9	FW	(United States)	Christian Chaney	18	14	6	2	2	0	1	1	2	9	7	4	29	23	12
10	MF	(England)	Aiden Mesias	14	9	4	0	0	0	2	2	0	9	5	0	25	16	4
11	FW	(Senegal)	Cherif Dieye	15	1	0	1	0	0	0	0	0	6	1	0	21	2	0
12	FW	(United States)	Garrett McLaughlin (Note: Joined Forward Madison FC after the team was eliminated from the 2024 U.S. Open Cup.)	11	4	0	2	0	0				5	2	1	17	6	1
14	FW	(Venezuela)	Mauro Cichero	6	0	0	0	0	0	2	2	0	0	0	0	8	2	0
16	DF	(Austria)	Jake Crull	20	17	1	2	2	0	2	2	0	10	10	0	33	30	1
17	FW	(United States)	Derek Gebhard	22	20	3	2	2	1	1	0	0	10	6	2	34	27	6
19	FW	(Colombia)	Juan Galindrez	22	15	6	2	0	0	2	0	0	10	5	1	35	20	7
20	FW	(Uruguay)	Agustín Dávila	11	0	2	0	0	0	2	2	0	3	1	0	16	3	2
21	MF	(United States)	Jimmie Villalobos	21	20	1	2	2	0	1	0	0	10	10	0	33	31	1
22	DF	(United States)	Stephen Payne	22	20	0	2	2	0	2	2	0	9	5	0	34	28	0
24	FW	(South Africa)	Nazeem Bartman	7	4	0	0	0	0	2	2	0	4	2	0	13	8	0
25	DF	(Democratic Republic of the Congo)	Ferrety Sousa	22	10	0	2	2	0	2	0	0	8	5	0	33	16	0
99	GK	(United States)	Martin Sanchez	0	0	0	0	0	0	2	2	0	0	0	0	2	2	0
Players who left Forward Madison FC during the season
26	DF	(United States)	Jake Fuderer	0	0	0				2	1	0				2	1	0

=== Goalscorers ===
Rank	Position	Name	USL1 Season	USL1 Playoffs	U.S. Open Cup	USL Cup	Total
1	FW	(United States) Christian Chaney	6	0	2	4	12
2	MF	(United States) Devin Boyce	5	1	0	1	7
2	FW	(Colombia) Juan Galindrez	6	0	0	1	7
4	FW	(United States) Derek Gebhard	3	1	0	2	6
5	MF	(United States) Wolfgang Prentice	3	0	0	2	5
6	MF	(England) Aiden Mesias	4	0	0	0	4
7	MF	(United States) John Murphy	3	0	0	0	3
8	FW	(Uruguay) Agustín Dávila	2	0	0	0	2
9	DF	(Israel) Michael Chilaka	1	0	0	0	1
9	DF	(Austria) Jake Crull	1	0	0	0	1
9	FW	(United States) Garrett McLaughlin	0	0	0	1	1
9	DF	(Australia) Mitch Osmond	0	0	0	1	1
9	MF	(United States) Jimmie Villalobos	1	0	0	0	1
Own goal			0	0	0	1	1
Total			35	2	2	13	52

=== Assist scorers ===
Rank	Position	Name	USL1 Season	USL1 Playoffs	U.S. Open Cup	USL Cup	Total
1	FW	(United States) Derek Gebhard	5	0	0	0	5
1	MF	(United States) Wolfgang Prentice	4	0	0	1	5
3	FW	(United States) Christian Chaney	3	0	0	1	4
4	DF	(Austria) Jake Crull	2	0	0	1	3
5	FW	(South Africa) Nazeem Bartman	2	0	0	0	2
5	MF	(United States) Devin Boyce	1	1	0	0	2
5	FW	(Colombia) Juan Galindrez	2	0	0	0	2
5	DF	(Democratic Republic of the Congo) Ferrety Sousa	0	0	1	1	2
5	MF	(United States) Jimmie Villalobos	1	0	0	1	2
10	FW	(Uruguay) Agustín Dávila	1	0	0	0	1
10	FW	(Senegal) Cherif Dieye	1	0	0	0	1
10	DF	(United States) Jake Fuderer	0	0	1	0	1
10	FW	(United States) Garrett McLaughlin	1	0	0	0	1
10	DF	(United States) Timmy Mehl	0	0	0	1	1
10	MF	(United States) John Murphy	1	0	0	0	1
10	DF	(Australia) Mitch Osmond	0	0	0	1	1
10	DF	(United States) Stephen Payne	1	0	0	0	1
Total			25	1	2	7	35

=== Clean sheets ===
Rank	Name	USL1 Season	USL1 Playoffs	U.S. Open Cup	USL Cup	Total
1	(Philippines) Bernd Schipmann	9	2	0	3	14
2	(United States) Martin Sanchez	0	0	1	0	1
Total		9	2	1	3	15

=== Disciplinary record ===
Rank	Position	Name	USL1 Season			USL1 Playoffs			U.S. Open Cup			USL Cup			Total		
Rank	Position	Name	Yellow card	(yellow card) (yellow-red card)	Red card	Yellow card	(yellow card) (yellow-red card)	Red card	Yellow card	(yellow card) (yellow-red card)	Red card	Yellow card	(yellow card) (yellow-red card)	Red card	Yellow card	(yellow card) (yellow-red card)	Red card
1	FW	(United States) Christian Chaney	6	0	0	1	0	0	0	0	0	4	1	0	11	1	0
2	MF	(United States) Devin Boyce	8	0	0	0	0	0	0	0	0	3	0	0	11	0	0
2	DF	(United States) Timmy Mehl	6	1	0	0	0	0	1	0	0	1	0	0	8	1	0
4	MF	(United States) John Murphy	8	0	0	0	0	0	0	0	0	2	0	0	10	0	0
5	DF	(Israel) Michael Chilaka	7	0	0	0	0	0	0	0	0	1	0	0	8	0	0
5	DF	(Democratic Republic of the Congo) Ferrety Sousa	4	0	0	0	0	0	2	0	0	2	0	0	8	0	0
7	MF	(United States) Wolfgang Prentice	3	0	0	0	0	0	0	0	0	4	0	0	7	0	0
8	FW	(Venezuela) Mauro Cichero	2	0	1	0	0	0	0	0	0	0	0	0	2	0	1
8	FW	(Colombia) Juan Galindrez	3	0	0	0	0	0	1	0	0	2	0	0	6	0	0
10	DF	(Austria) Jake Crull	2	0	0	0	0	0	0	0	0	3	0	0	5	0	0
10	GK	(Philippines) Bernd Schipmann	3	0	0	0	0	0	0	0	0	2	0	0	5	0	0
10	MF	(United States) Jimmie Villalobos	2	0	0	1	0	0	0	0	0	2	0	0	5	0	0
13	FW	(Senegal) Cherif Dieye	3	0	0	0	0	0	0	0	0	1	0	0	4	0	0
13	MF	(England) Aiden Mesias	2	0	0	0	0	0	0	0	0	2	0	0	4	0	0
15	DF	(Australia) Mitch Osmond	1	0	0	0	0	0	0	0	0	2	0	0	3	0	0
16	FW	(United States) Derek Gebhard	1	0	0	1	0	0	0	0	0	0	0	0	2	0	0
16	FW	(United States) Garrett McLaughlin	1	0	0	0	0	0	0	0	0	1	0	0	2	0	0
16	DF	(United States) Stephen Payne	1	0	0	0	0	0	0	0	0	1	0	0	2	0	0
19	FW	(Uruguay) Agustín Dávila	0	0	0	0	0	0	0	0	0	1	0	0	1	0	0
Total			57	1	1	3	0	0	4	0	0	29	1	0	93	2	1

== Honors and awards ==
=== USL League One Yearly Awards ===
==== Individual awards ====
Award	Finish	Player	Ref.
Defender of the Year	Finalist	(Australia) Mitch Osmond	
Goalkeeper of the Year	Finalist	(Philippines) Bernd Schipmann	
Comeback Player of the Year	Finalist	(United States) Devin Boyce	

==== All-League Team ====
Team	Position	Player	Ref.
First	MF	(United States) Devin Boyce	
First	DF	(Australia) Mitch Osmond	
Second	MF	(United States) Jimmie Villalobos	

=== USL League One Monthly Awards ===
==== Coach of the Month ====
Month	Coach	Ref.
June	(United States) Matt Glaeser	

=== USL League One Weekly Awards ===
==== Goal of the Week ====
Week	Player	Opponent	Ref.
4	(United States) John Murphy	Central Valley Fuego FC	
15	(United States) Christian Chaney	Central Valley Fuego FC	
21	(United States) John Murphy	Spokane Velocity FC	
23	(England) Aiden Mesias	Chattanooga Red Wolves SC	

==== Team of the Week ====
Week	Position	Player	Ref.
2	MF	(United States) Devin Boyce	
3	GK	(Philippines) Bernd Schipmann	
3	Bench	(United States) Timmy Mehl	
4	MF	(United States) Devin Boyce	
4	FW	(United States) Derek Gebhard	
4	MF	(United States) John Murphy	
4	DF	(Australia) Mitch Osmond	
4	GK	(Philippines) Bernd Schipmann	
4	Bench	(United States) Timmy Mehl	
6	MF	(United States) Devin Boyce	
9	Coach	(United States) Matt Glaeser	
9	FW	(United States) Christian Chaney	
9	GK	(Philippines) Bernd Schipmann	
9	Bench	(United States) Wolfgang Prentice	
9	Bench	(United States) Jimmie Villalobos	
10	Coach	(United States) Matt Glaeser	
10	FW	(United States) Christian Chaney	
10	MF	(United States) Derek Gebhard	
10	MF	(England) Aiden Mesias	
10	Bench	(Philippines) Bernd Schipmann	
11	DF	(Australia) Mitch Osmond	
11	GK	(Philippines) Bernd Schipmann	
12	Bench	(Philippines) Bernd Schipmann	
13	Bench	(Colombia) Juan Galindrez	
15	DF	(United States) Timmy Mehl	
15	Bench	(United States) Devin Boyce	
15	Bench	(Austria) Jake Crull	
16	DF	(Austria) Jake Crull	
17	Bench	(Philippines) Bernd Schipmann	
19	Bench	(United States) Wolfgang Prentice	
19	Bench	(United States) Jimmie Villalobos	
21	FW	(United States) Derek Gebhard	
21	MF	(United States) John Murphy	
22	DF	(Israel) Michael Chilaka	
22	DF	(Austria) Jake Crull	
22	FW	(Colombia) Juan Galindrez	
22	MF	(United States) John Murphy	
23	FW	(United States) Christian Chaney	
23	MF	(England) Aiden Mesias	
23	GK	(Philippines) Bernd Schipmann	
24	GK	(Philippines) Bernd Schipmann	

=== USL Jägermeister Cup Awards ===
==== Goal of the Round ====
Round	Player	Opponent	Ref.
4	(Colombia) Juan Galindrez	Chattanooga Red Wolves SC	
7	(United States) Devin Boyce	Chattanooga Red Wolves SC	

==== Save of the Round ====
Round	Player	Opponent	Ref.
8	(Philippines) Bernd Schipmann	Union Omaha	

==== Team of the Round ====
Round	Position	Player	Ref.
2	FW	(United States) Christian Chaney	
4	DF	(Democratic Republic of the Congo) Ferrety Sousa	
6	DF	(Australia) Mitch Osmond	
7	MF	(United States) Devin Boyce	
7	FW	(United States) Garrett McLaughlin	
8	FW	(United States) Christian Chaney	
8	MF	(United States) Jimmie Villalobos	
