= Ferrety =

Ferrety may refer to:

- Ferrety Sousa (born 1990), Congolese footballer
- Valentina Ferrety, nickname of Mexican activist Karla Valentina Camarena (1986 or 1987 – 2020)
