= Michael Chilaka =

Israeli footballer (born 2000)

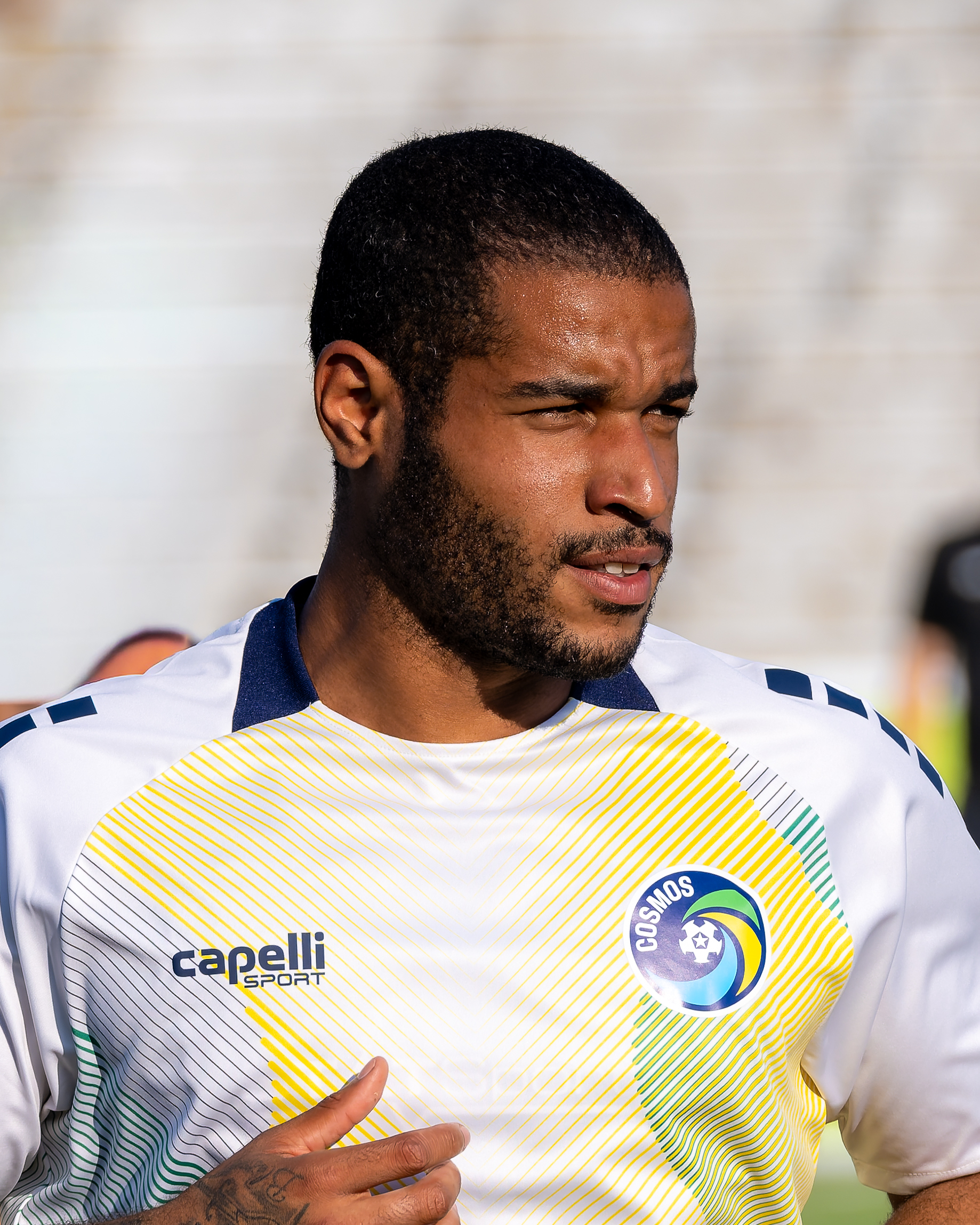
- Chilaka in 2026

Personal information
- Date of birth: February 5, 2000 (age 26)
- Place of birth: Tel Aviv-Yafo, Israel
- Height: 6 ft 0 in (1.83 m)
- Position: Defender

Team information
- Current team: New York Cosmos
- Number: 4

Senior career*
Years	Team	Apps	(Gls)
–2018	Maccabi Kabilio Jaffa	20	(0)
2018–2023	Maccabi Tel Aviv	0	(0)
2019–2022	→ Beitar Tel Aviv Bat Yam (loan)	82	(0)
2023	→ Hapoel Umm al-Fahm (loan)	9	(0)
2023	San Diego Loyal	10	(0)
2024–2025	Forward Madison	39	(1)
2026	Maccabi Jaffa	2	(0)
2026	New York Cosmos	5	(0)

International career^{‡}
2017	Israel U17	3	(0)
- * Club domestic league appearances and goals as of 24 August 2026 ‡ National team caps and goals as of January 10, 2024

Michael Chilaka (Hebrew: מייקל צ'ילאקה; born February 5, 2000) is an Israeli footballer who currently plays for New York Cosmos.

== Professional career ==
=== Maccabi Kabilio Jaffa ===
Chilaka started his professional career with Maccabi Kabilio Jaffa of Liga Alef, Israel's third division. He made 20 appearances with their first team, as well as 27 appearances for their under-19 team.

=== Maccabi Tel Aviv ===
In June 2018, Chilaka was sold by Maccabi Kabilio Jaffa to Maccabi Tel Aviv. He was subsequently signed to a three-year contract with a two-year club option.

In May 2021, Chilaka's contract option was exercised for Maccabi Tel Aviv's 2021–22 and 2022–23 seasons.

Chilaka did not make an appearance for Maccabi's first team but made thirty appearances for their under-19 team.

=== Beitar Tel Aviv Bat Yam ===
From 2019 through summer 2022, Maccabi Tel Aviv sent Chilaka on loan to Beitar Tel Aviv Bat Yam of Liga Leumit. On May 19, 2021, he scored his first professional goal in the Israel State Cup Semifinals against top-flight powerhouse Hapoel Tel Aviv helping his side to a 1–1 draw.

Chilaka, along with many other Maccabi Tel Aviv players, was recalled to the parent team after Beitar Tel Aviv Bat Yam was relegated after their 2021–22 season. Chilaka was not sent on loan for the summer 2022 transfer window, as he had sustained a serious injury while on vacation in Greece.

=== Hapoel Umm al-Fahm ===
Chilaka was sent on loan by Maccabi Tel Aviv to Hapoel Umm al-Fahm for the second half of their 2022–23 season.

=== San Diego Loyal ===
After his contract with Maccabi Tel Aviv expired, Chilaka signed with San Diego Loyal of USL Championship in the United States.

=== Forward Madison ===
Chilaka signed with Forward Madison of USL League One on January 10, 2024, in advance of their 2024 season. On October 4, 2024, Chilaka scored his first goal for the club, scoring on a header in a 4–2 victory over Charlotte Independence. In two seasons at the club Chilaka made 54 appearances scoring one goal.

=== Maccabi Jaffa ===
After the 2025 USL League One season Chilaka returned to Israel and signed with Maccabi Jaffa in Liga Leumit. He remained with the club for a few months before returning to the United States.

=== New York Cosmos ===
On July 23, 2026, Chilaka returned to the United States signing with New York Cosmos.

== International career ==
Chilaka played for Israel's U-17 team, appearing in international friendlies against Ukraine and Belarus in January 2017.

== Personal ==
Chilaka has both Israeli and Nigerian citizenship, having an Israeli mother and Nigerian father.

== Career statistics ==
As of match played 26 August 2026

Appearances and goals by club, season and competition
Club	Season	League			National cup		League cup		Other		Total	
Club	Season	Division	Apps	Goals	Apps	Goals	Apps	Goals	Apps	Goals	Apps	Goals
Maccabi Kabilio Jaffa	2017-2018	Liga Alef	20	0	1	0	0	0	0	0	21	0
Beitar Tel Aviv Bat Yam	2019-2020	Liga Leumit	20	0	1	0	0	0	0	0	21	0
Beitar Tel Aviv Bat Yam	2020-2021	Liga Leumit	33	0	4	1	0	0	0	0	37	1
Beitar Tel Aviv Bat Yam	2021-2022	Liga Leumit	29	0	2	0	0	0	0	0	31	0
Beitar Tel Aviv Bat Yam	Total		82	0	7	1	0	0	0	0	89	1
Hapoel Umm al-Fahm (loan)	2022-2023	Liga Leumit	9	0	0	0	0	0	0	0	9	0
San Diego Loyal	2023	USL Championship	10	0	0	0	0	0	0	0	10	0
Forward Madison	2024	USL League One	17	1	2	0	7	0	2	0	28	1
Forward Madison	2025	USL League One	22	0	0	0	4	0	0	0	26	0
Forward Madison	Total		39	1	2	0	11	0	2	0	54	1
Maccabi Jaffa	2025-2026	Liga Leumit	2	0	0	0	0	0	0	0	2	0
New York Cosmos	2026	USL League One	5	0	0	0	0	0	0	0	5	0
Career total			167	1	10	1	11	0	2	0	190	2
