= Cherif Dieye =

Senegalese footballer

Personal information
- Date of birth: November 11, 1997 (age 28)
- Place of birth: Dakar, Senegal
- Height: 1.75 m (5 ft 9 in)
- Position: Winger

Team information
- Current team: Forward Madison
- Number: 11

Youth career
- 2013–2016: IMG Academy

College career
Years	Team	Apps	(Gls)
2016–2019	Louisville Cardinals	80	(19)

Senior career*
Years	Team	Apps	(Gls)
2020	New York Red Bulls II	15	(1)
2022–2023	Central Valley Fuego	33	(6)
2024–	Forward Madison	15	(0)
- * Club domestic league appearances and goals as of 17:02, 23 November 2024 (UTC)

Cherif Dieye (born 11 January 1997) is a Senegalese football player who plays as a winger for USL League One club Forward Madison.

== Career ==
=== Youth and college ===
Dieye played three seasons with the IMG Academy in Florida, before going to play college soccer at the University of Louisville in 2016. During his time with the Cardinals, Dieye made 80 appearances, scored 19 goals and tallied eight assists. In 2018 he was named ACC Championship All-Tournament Team and All-ACC Third Team, and in 2019 USC All-South Region Second Team and All-ACC Second Team.

=== Professional ===
On 9 January 2020, Dieye was selected 15th overall in the 2020 MLS SuperDraft by New York Red Bulls. He signed with their USL Championship affiliate side New York Red Bulls II on 2 March 2020.

He made his professional debut on 17 July 2020, starting against Hartford Athletic.

He was released by Red Bulls II on November 30, 2020.

On 2 May 2022, Dieye signed with USL League One side Central Valley Fuego.

Dieye moved to Forward Madison in December 2023.
