= John Murphy (soccer, born 2000) =

American soccer player (born 2000)

Personal information
- Full name: John Murphy Jr.
- Date of birth: April 19, 2000 (age 26)
- Place of birth: Scotch Plains, New Jersey, United States
- Height: 1.80 m (5 ft 11 in)
- Position: Midfielder

Team information
- Current team: One Knoxville
- Number: 8

Youth career
- Players Development Academy
- New York Red Bulls

Senior career*
Years	Team	Apps	(Gls)
2018	New York Red Bulls II	2	(0)
2019	Loudoun United	4	(0)
2021	Union Omaha	8	(0)
2022	New York Red Bulls II	30	(2)
2023	South Georgia Tormenta	28	(0)
2024–2025	Forward Madison	49	(3)
2026–	One Knoxville	32	(5)
- * Club domestic league appearances and goals as of October 31, 2026

John Murphy Jr. (born April 19, 2000) is an American soccer player who currently plays as a midfielder for One Knoxville SC in USL League One.

== Early life ==
Born in Scotch Plains, New Jersey, Murphy came up through the academy system of the Players Development Academy in New Jersey before joining the New York Red Bulls Academy. He also played for the New York Red Bulls PDL and USL teams.

== Club career ==
=== New York Red Bulls II ===
Prior to the 2018 season, it was announced that Murphy would be part of New York Red Bulls II of the United Soccer League as a registered academy player. Murphy then made his debut for Red Bulls II on March 27, 2018, against Atlanta United 2. He came on as an 84th-minute substitute for Steven Echevarria as Red Bulls II lost 3–1.

=== Loudoun United ===
On June 27, 2019, Murphy signed with USL Championship club Loudoun United FC for the remainder of their inaugural season. Murphy made his debut for Loudoun United on July 20, 2019, in a 2–0 loss against Indy Eleven.

=== Union Omaha ===
In April 2021, Murphy joined USL League One side Union Omaha ahead of the 2021 season. On April 24, 2021, he made his debut for Union Omaha in a 2–0 victory against South Georgia Tormenta FC in the opening match of the USL1 season.

=== Return to New York Red Bulls II ===
On March 3, 2022, Murphy completed a deal to return to New York Red Bulls II, now a USL Championship club. On April 2, 2022, Murphy scored his first professional goal in a 3–2 loss to FC Tulsa. He scored his second goal of the season on August 20, 2022, in the 2–2 draw against Pittsburgh Riverhounds.

=== South Georgia Tormenta ===
On February 9, 2023, Murphy signed a one-year deal with USL League One side South Georgia Tormenta.

=== Forward Madison ===
Murphy joined Forward Madison prior to their 2024 season.

=== One Knoxville SC ===
On 20 January 2026, Murphy signed for One Knoxville SC.

== International career ==
Murphy has represented the US National Team at the U15, U16 and U17 level. He also participated in a U18 National Team Camp for Ireland as he holds dual citizenship.

== Personal life ==
Murphy is the younger brother of soccer play James Murphy.

== Career statistics ==
As of March 28, 2018

Club	Season	League			Cup		Continental		Total	
Club	Season	Division	Apps	Goals	Apps	Goals	Apps	Goals	Apps	Goals
New York Red Bulls II	2018	USL	2	0	—	—	—	—	2	0
Career total			2	0	0	0	0	0	2	0
