= Karla Valentina Camarena =

Mexican trans activist (killed 2020)

- Born: 1986 or 1987
- Died: 29 March 2020 (aged 33)
- Other name: Valentina Ferrety
- Known for: Transgender rights activism

Karla Valentina Camarena del Castillo (1986 or 1987 – 29 March 2020), also known as Valentina Ferrety, was a Mexican transgender rights activist. She was shot dead in the street by unknown attackers in what is reported to be a transphobic femicide.

== Murder ==
Camarena was shot on 29 March 2020 on the street in San Felipe, Guanajuato. Her body was officially identified on 31 March 2020. As of January 2026 authorities have not yet publicly linked any individuals involved with her murder.

RedLacTrans (Red Latinoamericana y del Caribe de Personas Trans) gave a statement about her death and noted that the media had failed to respect her gender identity (no respetaron su identidad de género femenina).

Camarena had organised the first Gay March in Salamanca, and was a leader in the struggle for the recognition of trans identity in Guanajuato state, where she was the state coordinator of the Mexican Network of Trans Women.
