= Agustín Dávila =

Uruguayan footballer (born 1999)

Personal information
- Full name: Fabián Agustín Dávila Silva
- Date of birth: 5 January 1999 (age 27)
- Place of birth: Rivera, Uruguay
- Height: 1.77 m (5 ft 10 in)
- Position: Forward

Youth career
- Oriental Atlético Club
- 2011–2017: Peñarol

Senior career*
Years	Team	Apps	(Gls)
2017–2021	Peñarol	12	(0)
2017–2019	→ Real Sociedad B (loan)	23	(3)
2020–2021	→ Liverpool Montevideo (loan)	16	(1)
2021–2024	Boston River	10	(1)
2023	→ Guayaquil City (loan)	8	(0)
2024	Forward Madison	11	(2)
2025	Tacuarembó	16	(0)

International career
2017	Uruguay U18	7	(4)
2018–2019	Uruguay U20	15	(3)
- * Club domestic league appearances and goals as of 1 January 2026

Fabián Agustín Dávila Silva (born 5 January 1999) is a Uruguayan professional footballer who plays as a forward.

== Club career ==
Dávila is a youth academy graduate of Peñarol. On 31 August 2017, Spanish club Real Sociedad announced the signing of Dávila on a two-year long loan deal with an option to buy. On 3 February 2018, Dávila made his debut for club's reserve team Real Sociedad B which plays in Segunda División B, the third tier of Spanish football league system. He came on as an 81st-minute substitute for Marcos Celorrio in his team's 1–0 win against SD Amorebieta.

Dávila returned to Peñarol after the expiry of loan deal, as the Basque-based side decided not to activate his purchase option. On 6 October 2019, he made his professional debut in Peñarol's 1–0 away loss against Liverpool Montevideo.

In August 2021, Dávila terminated his contract with Peñarol and joined Boston River. Boston River then loaned him to Ecuadorian Serie A club Guayaquil City for the 2023 season.

On 31 January 2024, USL League One club Forward Madison announced the signing of Dávila for the 2024 season.

== International career ==
Dávila is a former Uruguay youth international. He was part of under-20 team which finished third at 2019 South American U-20 Championship.

== Personal life ==
Dávila is the grandson of Walkir Silva, who notably scored Peñarol's second goal in their 2–0 win against Aston Villa in the 1982 Intercontinental Cup.

== Honours ==
Liverpool Montevideo

- Supercopa Uruguaya: 2020

Uruguay U20

- South American Youth Football Championship third place: 2019
