= Devin Boyce =

American soccer player (born 1996)

Personal information
- Date of birth: September 8, 1996 (age 30)
- Place of birth: St. Louis, Missouri, U.S.
- Height: 1.78 m (5 ft 10 in)
- Position: Midfielder

Team information
- Current team: Greenville Triumph
- Number: 7

College career
| Years | Team | Apps | (Gls) |
| 2016–2017 | New Mexico Lobos | 39 | (5) |
| 2018–2019 | Saint Louis Billikens | 32 | (9) |

Senior career*
| Years | Team | Apps | (Gls) |
| 2017 | Saint Louis FC U23 | 1 | (0) |
| 2018 | Colorado Rapids U23 | 5 | (1) |
| 2019 | Brazos Valley Cavalry | 12 | (4) |
| 2020–2021 | Union Omaha | 43 | (5) |
| 2022 | Memphis 901 | 15 | (0) |
| 2023 | Greenville Triumph | 28 | (1) |
| 2024–2025 | Forward Madison | 43 | (6) |
| 2026– | Greenville Triumph | 26 | (3) |
- * Club domestic league appearances and goals as of October 31, 2026

Devin Boyce (born September 8, 1996) is an American soccer player who plays as a midfielder for Greenville Triumph in USL League One.

== Career ==
=== Union Omaha ===
Just four days before Union Omaha's first USL League One match, Boyce was brought into the club. He made his debut for the club in their first ever competitive match against New England Revolution II. Despite Boyce's late introduction to the first team, he appeared in all 16 of Omaha's 2020 league matches en route to the club's runner-up championship finish.

Boyce's sophomore season saw him continue to feature prominently, scoring five goals in 27 appearances as Union Omaha claimed the league title. During the regular season, Boyce recorded the second-highest assist number in the league with eight, and tallied a total of 40 key passes. He was named to the USL League One All-League Second Team following the 2021 season. Boyce's playoff volley against FC Tucson was additionally named the Fans' Choice Goal of the Year. At the time of his departure, Boyce was the club's leading player in both appearances and assists.

=== Memphis 901 ===
On January 20, 2022, Boyce signed with USL Championship side Memphis 901. Boyce struggled to break into the starting 11 in his sole season with the club, making just two starts and 13 additional appearances off the bench. At the end of 2022, Boyce departed the club.

=== Greenville Triumph ===
Boyce returned to USL League One ahead of the 2023 season, signing with Greenville Triumph on January 26, 2023.

=== Forward Madison ===
Following the 2023 season, Boyce left Greenville and signed with rival USL League One club Forward Madison on January 4, 2024. Boyce started and scored in his debut for the club, a 1–1 away draw at South Georgia Tormenta FC. After scoring twice in the opening month of the season, Boyce was nominated for the league's Player of the Month award for March.

=== Return to Greenville Triumph ===
In 2026, he return to Greenville Triumph

== Personal life ==
Boyce's father, Barney, played professionally in the NASL and MISL during the 1980s and 1990s. Boyce attributes his work rate to his father's influence.

== Career statistics ==
=== Club ===
As of match played August 14, 2024

Appearances and goals by club, season and competition
| Club | Season | League | | | Cup | | Other | | Total | |
| Club | Season | Division | Apps | Goals | Apps | Goals | Apps | Goals | Apps | Goals |
|---|---|---|---|---|---|---|---|---|---|---|
| Union Omaha | 2020 | USL League One | 16 | 1 | — | | — | | 16 | 1 |
| Union Omaha | 2021 | USL League One | 27 | 4 | — | | 2 (Note: Appearance(s) in USL League One playoffs) | 1 | 29 | 5 |
| Union Omaha | Total | | 43 | 5 | — | | 2 | 1 | 45 | 6 |
| Memphis 901 | 2022 | USL Championship | 15 | 0 | 1 (Note: Appearance in U.S. Open Cup) | 0 | — | | 16 | 0 |
| Greenville Triumph | 2023 | USL League One | 28 | 1 | 1 | 0 | 1 | 0 | 30 | 1 |
| Forward Madison | 2024 | USL League One | 14 | 4 | 8 (Note: Seven appearances and one goal in USL Cup, one appearance in U.S. Open Cup) | 1 | — | | 22 | 5 |
| Career total | | | 100 | 10 | 10 | 1 | 3 | 1 | 113 | 12 |

== Honors ==
Team

- USL League One
  - Champions: 2021
- USL League One Regular Season
  - Players' Shield: 2021

Individual

- USL League One
  - All–League: Second Team: 2021
