= Denzel Akyeampong =

English footballer

Personal information
- Full name: Denzel Owoahene-Akyeampong
- Date of birth: 2 May 2004 (age 22)
- Place of birth: London, England
- Height: 1.74 m (5 ft 9 in)
- Positions: Defender; winger

Team information
- Current team: Carshalton Athletic

Youth career
- 2013–2023: Fox SA

Senior career*
Years	Team	Apps	(Gls)
2021–2022	Tooting Bec	2	(0)
2023–2024	Charlotte Independence	7	(0)
2025–2026	Torquay United	12	(0)
2026–	Carshalton Athletic	1	(0)
- * Club domestic league appearances and goals as of 18:17, 1 March 2026 (UTC)

Denzel Owoahene-Akyeampong (born 2 May 2004) is an English professional footballer who plays as a defender for Isthmian League Premier Division club Carshalton Athletic

== Career ==
=== Youth ===
Akyeampong was spotted at primary school during a Crystal Palace foundation event in 2013, which saw him join the Fox Soccer Academy. During his time at the FSA, Akyeampong helped the team to achieving three league titles and played a part in helping the team to qualify for two National Finals in 2022 and 2023, where they were crowned National Champion in 2022. Akyeampong trialled with numerous clubs including West Bromwich Albion and AB.

Akyeampong also spent time with the under-23 team of Southern Counties East League Division One side Tooting Bec during their 2021–22 season, where he scoring 16 goals in 14 appearances. He also made two senior appearances for the club in 2022.

=== Professional ===
After appearing in a showcase organised by the FSA, Akyeampong was spotted by the head coach of USL League One side Charlotte Independence. He went on trial with the club in February 2023, and signed his first professional contract with Charlotte on 23 June 2023. He didn't make an appearance for the club during the 2023 season, but re-signed for the team on 8 December 2023.

On 23 August 2025, Akyeampong joined National League South club Torquay United on a short-term deal having impressed on trial. In February 2026, he joined Carshalton Athletic.
