= Ferrety Sousa =

Congolese footballer

Personal information
- Full name: Panzani Ferrety Sousa
- Date of birth: 25 December 1990 (age 35)
- Place of birth: Kinshasa, Zaire
- Height: 5 ft 7 in (1.70 m)
- Positions: Midfielder; fullback

Team information
- Current team: Forward Madison
- Number: 25

Senior career*
Years	Team	Apps	(Gls)
2008–2010	FCM Aubervilliers		
2011–2012	Carolina RailHawks U-23		
2013–2015	Atlanta Silverbacks	12	(0)
2016	Wilmington Hammerheads	12	(0)
2017–2018	Atlanta Silverbacks		
2019	Las Vegas Lights	14	(1)
2020–2021	Union Omaha	40	(2)
2022–2023	Sacramento Republic	26	(0)
2024–	Forward Madison FC	46	(1)
- * Club domestic league appearances and goals as of 26 January 2024 ‡ National team caps and goals as of 13:31, 1 November 2025 (UTC)

Panzani Ferrety Sousa (born 25 December 1990) is a Congolese professional footballer who plays as a midfielder and defender for Forward Madison FC in USL League One.

== Career ==
Born in the Democratic Republic of the Congo, Sousa grew up in Aubervilliers, France and moved to Raleigh, North Carolina at ten years old.

Sousa began his career with French side FCM Aubervilliers, with whom he played for two seasons. He then moved back to North Carolina, joining the Carolina RailHawks U-23's and helping lead the team to a USASA national championship in 2011.

Sousa signed a contract with the Atlanta Silverbacks in 2013, but didn't make his debut for the club until 3 May 2014, against Ottawa Fury FC at Atlanta Silverbacks Park. Sousa was subbed in at the 83rd minute and was cautioned with a yellow card six minutes later.

On 25 January 2022, Sousa signed with the USL Championship's Sacramento Republic. He left Sacramento following their 2023 season.

On 26 January 2024, Forward Madison FC announced that it had signed Sousa for the 2024 season.
