= Timmy Mehl =

American soccer player (born 1995)

Personal information
- Date of birth: August 31, 1995 (age 31)
- Place of birth: Manhattan Beach, California, United States
- Height: 6 ft 1 in (1.85 m)
- Position: Defender

Youth career
- Loyola High School

College career
| Years | Team | Apps | (Gls) |
| 2015–2018 | Indiana Hoosiers | 72 | (6) |

Senior career*
| Years | Team | Apps | (Gls) |
| 2019 | North Carolina FC | 1 | (0) |
| 2019 | → Chattanooga Red Wolves (loan) | 3 | (0) |
| 2020–2021 | Loudoun United | 39 | (0) |
| 2022 | Tampa Bay Rowdies | 3 | (0) |
| 2022 | → Chattanooga Red Wolves (loan) | 20 | (2) |
| 2023–2025 | Forward Madison | 66 | (0) |
- * Club domestic league appearances and goals as of October 31, 2025

Timmy Mehl (born August 31, 1995) is an American professional soccer player who currently plays as a defender.

== Career ==
=== College ===
Mehl played four years of college soccer at Indiana University between 2015 and 2018, making a total of 72 appearances for the Hoosiers, scoring 6 goals and tallying 4 assists. He was twice selected to the All-Big Ten team.

=== Professional ===
On January 23, 2019, Mehl signed with North Carolina FC of the USL Championship. He made his professional debut in a U.S. Open Cup game against the Richmond Kickers on May 15. He made his USL league debut on July 13 in a game against Birmingham Legion FC.

On August 29, 2019, Mehl joined Chattanooga Red Wolves SC of USL League One on short-term loan.

On June 30, 2020, Loudoun United signed Mehl for the remainder of the 2020 season.

Mehl joined the Tampa Bay Rowdies on January 7, 2022. On June 10, 2022, Mehl was loaned to USL League One side Chattanooga Red Wolves for the remainder of the 2022 season. He was released by Tampa following their 2022 season.

On December 7, 2022, Mehl was announced as a new signing for USL League One's Forward Madison for their 2023 season.

== Personal life ==
Mehl attended Loyola High School in Los Angeles. While at Indiana, he majored in exercise science.
