= Juan Galindrez =

Colombian footballer (born 1994)

Personal information
- Full name: Juan Guillermo Galindrez Mosquera
- Date of birth: 4 July 1994 (age 32)
- Place of birth: Cali, Colombia
- Height: 1.82 m (6 ft 0 in)
- Position: Forward

Team information
- Current team: Forward Madison
- Number: 19

Senior career*
Years	Team	Apps	(Gls)
2016–2017	Real Cuautitlán	4	(0)
2017–2018	Tijuana Premier	34	(21)
2018–2019	Dorados de Sinaloa	6	(0)
2019–2020	Fortaleza CEIF	24	(4)
2021–2022	Chattanooga Red Wolves	55	(25)
2023	Rio Grande Valley FC	19	(3)
2024–	Forward Madison	46	(7)
- * Club domestic league appearances and goals as of 13:29, 1 November 2025 (UTC)

Juan Guillermo Galindrez Mosquera (born 4 July 1994) is a Colombian professional footballer who plays as a forward for Forward Madison FC in USL League One.

== Career ==
Galindrez began his career in Mexico with Real Cuautitlán, where he only played 4 games due to visa issues. He then moved to Club Tijuana, spending time with Tijuana Premier where he scored 21 goals in just 34 games. His final spell in Mexico was with Dorados de Sinaloa, where he was coached by Diego Maradona.

In 2019, Galindrez returned to Colombia with second-tier side Fortaleza CEIF.

On 22 February 2021, Galindrez signed with USL League One side Chattanooga Red Wolves. He made his debut for the club on 8 May 2021, starting in a 1–0 win over North Texas SC. He finished 2021 with 11 goals, tied for 5th in the league.

On 13 July 2022, Galindrez was named USL League One player of the month for June after scoring 6 goals throughout the month. He would finish the 2022 season with the 4th most goals in the league at 14.

On 25 January 2023, it was announced that Galindrez has signed with USL Championship side Rio Grande Valley FC. He appeared in 19 matches, starting six, and scored three goals. Rio Grande Valley folded at the end of the 2023 season. .

On 12 January 2024, it was announced that Galindrez had signed with USL League One side Forward Madison FC.
