= Jake Crull =

Austrian footballer (born 1997)

Personal information
- Date of birth: 3 October 1997 (age 29)
- Place of birth: Heiligenkreuz, Lower Austria, Austria
- Height: 1.85 m (6 ft 1 in)
- Positions: Left back; left winger

Team information
- Current team: Athletic Club Boise
- Number: 17

Youth career
- 2015–2016: Indiana Fire

College career
Years	Team	Apps	(Gls)
2016–2019	Spring Arbor Cougars	83	(23)

Senior career*
Years	Team	Apps	(Gls)
2018–2019	Charlotte Eagles	18	(1)
2020–2021	Union Omaha	34	(0)
2022	FC Tucson	30	(2)
2023–2025	Forward Madison	81	(5)
2026–	Athletic Club Boise	31	(1)
- * Club domestic league appearances and goals as of October 28, 2026

Jake Crull (born 3 October 1997) is an Austrian footballer who plays as a defender for Athletic Club Boise in USL League One.

== Career ==
=== Youth, college, and amateur ===
Crull spent time with the Indiana Fire academy, before playing college soccer at Spring Arbor University between 2016 and 2019. Crull was named two-time NAIA All-American for two consecutive years, and scored 23 goals and tallied 50 assists in 83 appearances for the Cougars.

While at college, Crull played in the USL League Two with Charlotte Eagles in 2018 and 2019.

=== Professional ===
On 14 January 2020, Crull signed with USL League One side Union Omaha. He made his debut on 1 August, starting against North Texas SC.

After two seasons in Omaha, Crull signed with FC Tucson on 21 December 2021.

On 7 December 2022, Crull signed with another USL League One team, Forward Madison.

On 12 January 2026, Crull signed for Athletic Club Boise, in USL League One.
