= Aiden Mesias =

English footballer (born 1999)

Personal information
- Date of birth: 23 October 1999 (age 27)
- Place of birth: London, England
- Height: 5 ft 8 in (1.73 m)
- Position: Midfielder

Team information
- Current team: FC Naples
- Number: 23

Youth career
- 2008–2011: Charlton Athletic
- 2012–2019: Queens Park Rangers

Senior career*
Years	Team	Apps	(Gls)
2019–2020	Hartford Athletic	14	(0)
2022	SSV Ulm 1846	1	(0)
2023–2025	Forward Madison	71	(6)
2026–	FC Naples	29	(1)
- * Club domestic league appearances and goals as of 19:34, 1 November 2026 (UTC)

Aiden Mesias (born 23 October 1999) is an English professional footballer who plays as a midfielder for USL League One club FC Naples.

== Career ==
Mesias played for Charlton Athletic from the ages of nine to 12 before spending six years with Queens Park Rangers. In November 2019, Mesias joined USL Championship club Hartford Athletic. On 20 July 2020, Mesias made his professional debut, coming on for the final three minutes in a 3–1 victory over Loudoun United.

On 1 February 2022, Mesias joined Regionalliga Südwest side SSV Ulm 1846 on a deal until the end of the season after a successful trial period.

Mesias signed with Forward Madison of USL League One on 18 January 2023. He made his first appearance for the club on 26 March 2023, playing 72 minutes in a 1-1 draw at Union Omaha. He scored his first professional goal on 27 May 2023, in a 2-1 win at Union Omaha.

On 26 December 2025, Mesias joined fellow USL League One side FC Naples.

== Personal life ==
Mesias grew up in Camden Town. He was born to a Filipino father and a Timorese mother. His father grew up in Germany where he played lower division football.
