= Forward Madison FC =

American soccer team

Forward Madison
- Full name: Forward Madison Football Club
- Nickname: Flamingos
- Founded: May 17, 2018; 8 years ago
- Stadium: Breese Stevens Field
- Capacity: 5,000
- Owner: Big Top Events
- COO: Conor Caloia
- Coach: Matt Glaeser
- League: USL League One
- 2026: USL League One, 4th of 17
- Website: forwardmadisonfc.com
| Home colors | Away colors |

Forward Madison FC is an American professional soccer team based in Madison, Wisconsin. The team was founded in 2018, and played its inaugural season in 2019. The team competes in USL League One, the third division of the United States soccer league system, and plays their home matches at Breese Stevens Field. It is the sister club of Rally Madison FC, who compete in the women's amateur USL W League.

== History ==
In January 2018, it was announced that Big Top Events, which owns the Madison Mallards and has operated Breese Stevens Field since 2015, were planning to bring a soccer franchise to Madison which would begin in early 2019. As part of the plan, Big Top Events looked to have $2 million invested into renovating the stadium, pending a contract renegotiation with the City of Madison. Big Top Events wished to have a longer-term lease, along with an increase in the number of concerts at the stadium, more employees at the venue, and $1.6 million from the city for facility upgrades.

On May 15, 2018, the Madison City Council approved a new ten-year contract with Big Top Events. As part of the agreement, the city agreed to pay $1.3 million toward facility improvements. This included an expansion of the stadium for a seating capacity of 5,000. Following this, Madison was officially announced as the fourth founding member of USL League One on May 17, 2018. The professional league, which is the third division in the US soccer league system, began in March 2019. Madison became the first team based in the Midwestern United States to join the league, and is the only current outdoor professional soccer team in Wisconsin. Following the announcement, Peter Wilt was appointed as managing director of the team. Wilt is well known for founding new clubs; Madison was the sixth team Wilt helped launch, having previously been involved in the formation of teams such as Chicago Fire and Indy Eleven.

Logo of Madison Pro Soccer prior to the club name being chosen

In June 2018, Madison Pro Soccer began a "Name Your Club" online voting contest to recommend a name for the team. Names under consideration spanned from traditional football names like "Madison United FC" to such whimsical choices as "Holsteins", "Madison Curds", and "77 Square Miles SC". On July 16, it was announced that the final vote was between the names "Forward Madison FC/SC" and "AFC Madison". Forward Madison FC was announced as the official name on November 18, 2018, along with the logo and team colors, at an event at the Wisconsin Historical Society. "Forward" is the state motto of Wisconsin.

On September 27, 2018, Daryl Shore was announced as the first head coach of Madison. He will also serve as the technical director of the team. Shore had previously worked in various roles at Chicago Fire with Peter Wilt, and served as the interim coach of Real Salt Lake in 2017. In September 2018, Don Smart was the team's first player signing, which was announced on October 24.

On December 7, 2018, the club announced a one-year affiliation agreement with Minnesota United FC of Major League Soccer.

Following the club's inaugural season, Peter Wilt left to take a position with the league, developing supporters groups and assisting teams with their fan engagement.

On March 5, 2020, the Forward Madison FC announced a one-year affiliation agreement with the Chicago Fire FC of Major League Soccer.

On December 1, 2020, Carl Craig was announced as the head coach and technical director. Craig had previously served as the head coach of NASL club Minnesota United. Following a 9th-place finish in 2021, Craig was dismissed.

Leading up to the 2022 season, Matt Glaeser was hired as head coach and technical director. In an email to season ticket holders before the final game of the 2022 season, COO Conor Caloia confirmed that Glaeser would return for the 2023 season.

=== Social media presence ===
The team started receiving national attention in January 2019, during the polar vortex, when the social media intern tweeted a photo of a plastic flamingo stuck in the snow accumulating on the field. Within a few days, the snow became deep enough to cover the entire flamingo. This second tweet went viral, ending up with over 22 thousand likes, and 7.8 thousand retweets. "Full mingo" has become a catchphrase for the team.

Forward Madison has continued to have a strong digital media presence, which the club uses to promote itself to fans outside of the Madison area, billing itself as "the world's second favorite team".

=== Mascot ===
On May 4, 2019, Forward Madison unveiled its dairy cow mascot, named "Lionela Bessi" following a fan vote. The club announced a retirement party for Bessi to be held at their 2024 home opener on April 13, 2024.

The club adopted Bessi's calf as a mascot as well. A second fan vote ended up with the name "Rose Cowbelle", after the University of Wisconsin alumna and pro player Rose Lavelle.

== Stadium ==
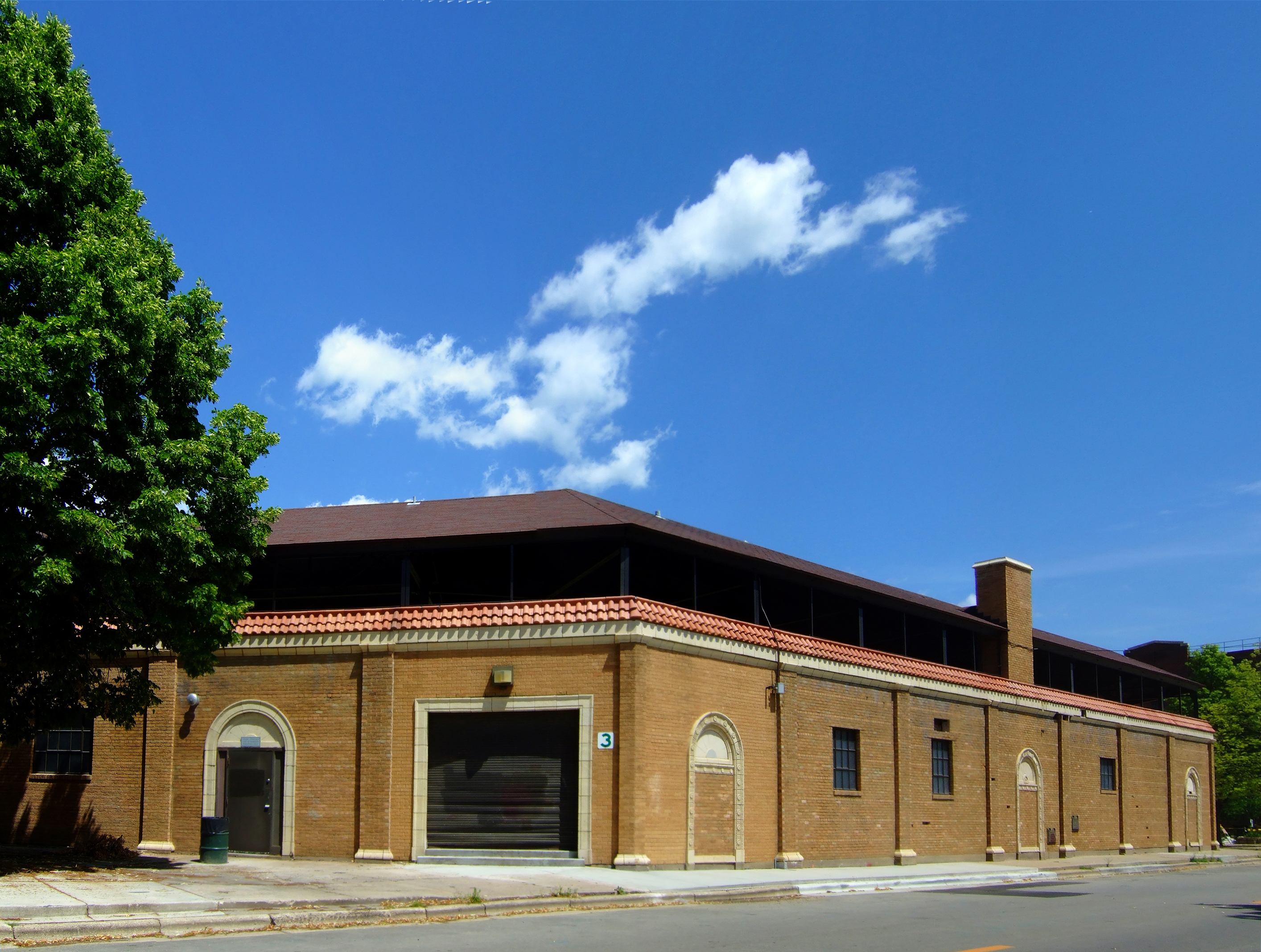
Breese Stevens Field hosts the team's matches.

The team plays their matches at Breese Stevens Field in Madison, which was expanded from a grandstand capacity of 3,740 to 5,000. The stadium, which was built in 1925, is the city's oldest sports park. It is owned by the City of Madison and has been operated since 2015 by Big Top Events. The venue has been designated as a city landmark since 1995, and in 2015 was listed on the National Register of Historic Places. The stadium hosts the East High School soccer and football teams, the Madison Radicals ultimate team, as well as other sport competitions, concerts, and community events.

Due to the COVID-19 pandemic, the club moved its 2020 USL League One season games to Hart Park in Wauwatosa, seventy-five miles away.

=== Attendance ===
Forward Madison FC's inaugural 2019 season saw an average home attendance of 4,292, the highest in USL League One.

== Uniforms ==
=== Badge and colors ===
Madison's city flag

The team's logo features a flamingo, as the city's official bird is the plastic flamingo lawn ornament. It was designed at Madison-based graphic design firm Planet Propaganda.

The club's light blue color comes from the Madison flag, as does the white sash. At the bottom of the badge, Roman numerals spell out 608, the city's area code.

=== Sponsorship ===
| Kit manufacturer | Period | Shirt sponsor | Sleeve sponsor |
|---|---|---|---|
| (Denmark) Hummel | 2019 | Dairyland Insurance | — |
| (Denmark) Hummel | 2020–present | Dairyland Insurance | Just Coffee Co-op |

=== Uniform history ===
Forward Madison FC has become known for creating "bold, interesting jerseys year after year". Those jerseys have also been a huge retail success; in their inaugural season, Forward Madison earned twice as much from shirt sales as the rest of USL League One combined. In 2021, team COO Conor Caloia revealed that 20 percent of the club's gross revenue comes from merchandise, as compared to 8-10% for most other teams.

Forward Madison's home jerseys feature a sky blue field with white sash, a reference to the city's flag (which itself references the geography of the city on an isthmus). A sublimated flamingo design appears on the home shirt, and sublimated pink flamingos dot the club's inaugural white away jersey.

On March 14, 2020, Forward Madison unveiled its second-ever change shirt. The design features diagonal pink stripes, with names of 900 season ticket holders in the white space between. The shirt was designed by members of the supporters group The Flock, in what is believed to be a first for professional sports.

The club's original pink-patterned third jersey, worn in U.S. Open Cup appearances, was selected as the best world soccer jersey in satellite radio channel SiriusXM FC's 2019 "Kit of the Year" competition. It defeated the Chicago Red Stars home kit with over 200,000 votes. A new third kit, featuring a swirling pattern of navy blue, sky blue, and pink, was unveiled on May 23, 2020. Called the "Drip Kit", it was inspired by team designer Cassidy Sepnieski's experiments with hydro dipping.

On June 23, 2021, Forward Madison unveiled a new third kit for 2021, including a fully reversible jersey. Dubbed the "Beach/Club" jersey, it is black with hot pink flamingos on one side, and pink with a hand-drawn Aloha shirt-style design on the other featuring flamingoes, palm trees, and the Wisconsin State Capitol. They wore the shirt at their next match, playing in the black side for the first half and reversing it to the pink side for the second half. The team believes this was the first time such a change had been pre-planned for a competitive match, as opposed to needing to address clash issues arising during one. The gimmick had been cleared with the USL ahead of time, after the league consulted the Laws of the Game and found no prohibition against it.

Later that year, Forward Madison held an unveiling ceremony in Madison and London for the release of an additional shirt to be worn only for friendlies, known as the "Friends With Benefits" shirt. Also designed by Cassidy Sepnieski, the shirt is covered with checkers of team colors pink, sky blue, and dark blue in fading gradients, with one of the squares being a QR code. Fans away from Madison can scan that code to purchase a beer for a fan at Breese Stevens Field. Fans in attendance at a home match can redeem one of the purchased beers and are given the name, location, and social handles of the purchaser so they can reach out to thank them. The club's stated intention with this shirt is "to connect the global soccer community through kits and beer".

==== Home ====
| 2019–2020 | 2021–2022 | 2023–2024 | 2025–2026 |

==== Away ====
| 2019 | 2020 | 2021 | 2022 | 2023 |

==== Alternate ====
| 2019 | 2020 | 2021 | 2021 | 2021 |

== Supporters ==
The club recognizes six independent supporters groups, each with a different focus. The Flock is the first and largest group, and the Independent Supporters' Association for the club. The other groups are La Barra 608, by and for Latino fans, Forward Union with a focus on community service, Featherstone Flamingos, an inclusive group that celebrates Black culture (named for Don Featherstone, creator of the plastic lawn flamingo), Accessimingos, the first supporters group in North America focused on fans with disabilities, and Mingo Ladies for women supporters. A portion of members of the Flock also run a group centered around civic engagement called "Pink Tape".

The club also has an international membership program called Mingos Worldwide, which comes with a scarf bearing their promotional slogan "The World's Second Favorite Team".

Alternative rock act The Racing Pulses wrote the song "Go, Forward!" for Forward Madison FC. The official music video for the song was released in 2020. It was filmed at Breese Stevens Field and features Mandela Barnes.

== Players and staff ==
=== Current roster ===
As of August 31, 2026.

Note: Flags indicate national team as defined under FIFA eligibility rules; some limited exceptions apply. Players may hold more than one non-FIFA nationality.

| No. | Pos. | Nation | Player |
|---|---|---|---|
| 1 | GK | USA | JT Harms |
| 3 | DF | USA | AJ Edwards |
| 4 | DF | USA | Collin McCamy |
| 5 | DF | USA | Jaylen Shannon |
| 6 | DF | RSA | Geni Kanyane |
| 7 | MF | GHA | Joshua Bolma |
| 8 | MF | USA | Mark Segbers |
| 9 | FW | NIR | Ryan Carmichael |
| 11 | FW | CIV | Claudel N'goubou |
| 12 | MF | USA | Roman Torres |
| 13 | DF | USA | Turner Humphrey |
| 14 | FW | GHA | Stephen Annor Gyamfi |
| 16 | MF | USA | Jackson Castro |

| No. | Pos. | Nation | Player |
|---|---|---|---|
| 17 | FW | USA | Derek Gebhard |
| 19 | GK | USA | Tenzing Manske |
| 20 | DF | USA | Kevin Carmichael |
| 21 | FW | USA | Hakim Karamoko (on loan from D.C. United) |
| 23 | DF | USA | Eddie Munjoma |
| 24 | DF | USA | Jahlane Forbes |
| 27 | FW | USA | Herbert Endeley |
| 28 | DF | USA | Joe Hildal (on loan from Forward Madison FC Academy) |
| 30 | MF | PAN | Enrique Machasen (on loan from C.D. Universitario) |
| 33 | DF | CAN | Kerfalla Toure |
| 38 | FW | USA | Maouloane Goumballe |
| 57 | MF | USA | Ben Augee |
| 99 | GK | USA | Kevin Flores (on loan from Forward Madison FC Academy) |

1. USL Academy Contract

=== Coaches and management ===
Coaching staff
| (United States) Matt Glaeser | Head Coach and Technical Director |
| (United States) Aaron Hohlbein | Assistant Coach |
| (United States) Jim Launder | Assistant Coach |
| (Ghana) Patrick Nyarko | Assistant Coach |
| (United States) Kyle Swanson | Goalkeeper Coach |
| (United States) Jacob Schmidt | Sports Performance Director |
Sport management and organization
| (United States) Conor Caloia | Chief Operating Officer |
| (England) Matt Cairns | Sporting Director |
| (United States) Keith Tiemeyer | Director of Soccer Operations & Development |
| (United States) Aaron Hohlbein | Academy Director |
MLS Next coaches
| (England) Laurie Bell | U19 Head Coach |
| (United States) Ryan Buda | U16 Head Coach |
| (United States) Lee Ferderer | U15 Head Coach |
| (United States) Aaron Hohlbein | U13 and U14 Head Coach |
Ownership
| (United States) Jim Kacmarcik | Majority partner and governor |
| (United States) Conor Caloia | Minority partner and alternate governor |
| (United States) Steve Schmitt | Minority partner |

== Records ==
=== Year-by-year ===
All records as of November 8, 2026.

| Season | League | Regular season | | | | | | | | Playoffs | U.S. Open Cup | USL Cup | Top scorer | | Average attendance |
| Season | League | Pld | W | D | L | GF | GA | Pts | Pos | Playoffs | U.S. Open Cup | USL Cup | Player | Goals | Average attendance |
|---|---|---|---|---|---|---|---|---|---|---|---|---|---|---|---|
| 2019 | USL1 | 28 | 12 | 7 | 9 | 33 | 26 | 43 | 4th | Semifinals | Third round | — | (Jamaica) Don Smart | 9 | 4,292 |
| 2020 | USL1 | 16 | 5 | 6 | 5 | 20 | 14 | 21 | 7th | Did not qualify | Cancelled | — | (Laos) Michael Vang | 4 | 504 |
| 2021 | USL1 | 28 | 8 | 12 | 8 | 32 | 34 | 36 | 9th | Did not qualify | Cancelled | — | (United States) Jake Keegan | 6 | 2,761 |
| 2022 | USL1 | 30 | 7 | 12 | 11 | 34 | 44 | 33 | 9th | Did not qualify | Third round | — | (Finland) Jeremiah Streng | 7 | 3,877 |
| 2023 | USL1 | 32 | 11 | 10 | 11 | 38 | 40 | 43 | 6th | Quarterfinals | Second round | — | (United States) Christian Chaney | 11 | 4,310 |
| 2024 | USL1 | 22 | 10 | 9 | 3 | 35 | 18 | 39 | 3rd | Semifinals | Second round | Runners-up | (United States) Christian Chaney | 12 | 4,083 |
| 2025 | USL1 | 30 | 8 | 11 | 11 | 31 | 43 | 35 | 10th | Did not qualify | Second round | Group 3: 5th | (United States) Derek Gebhard | 11 | 3,991 |
| 2026 | USL1 | 32 | 16 | 8 | 8 | 54 | 30 | 56 | 4th | Semifinals | First round | Group 4: 6th | (Northern Ireland) Ryan Carmichael | 16 | 3,780 |
| Total | | 218 | 77 | 75 | 66 | 277 | 249 | 306 | | | | | | | |

=== Head coach records ===
All records as of November 8, 2026. Includes regular season, playoffs, U.S. Open Cup, USL Cup. Excludes friendlies. Games going to penalty kicks marked as draws.

| Name | From | To | P | W | D | L | GF | GA | Win% |
|---|---|---|---|---|---|---|---|---|---|
| (United States) Daryl Shore | September 27, 2018 | October 27, 2020 | 48 | 19 | 13 | 16 | 59 | 45 | 39.58 |
| (England) Carl Craig | December 1, 2020 | November 4, 2021 | 28 | 8 | 12 | 8 | 32 | 34 | 28.57 |
| (United States) Matt Glaeser | December 3, 2021 | Present | 177 | 65 | 54 | 58 | 233 | 221 | 36.72 |

=== Player records ===
All statistics as of November 8, 2026. Players currently under contract by Forward Madison FC are in bold.

==== Most appearances ====
Competitive matches only, includes appearances as substitute. Numbers in parentheses indicate goals scored.

| Rank | Player | Years | League | Playoffs | U.S. Open Cup | USL Cup | Total |
|---|---|---|---|---|---|---|---|
| 1 | **(United States) Derek Gebhard** | 2021– | 145 (29) | 3 (1) | 5 (0) | 14 (2) | 167 (32) |
| 2 | (Austria) Jake Crull | 2023–2025 | 81 (4) | 3 (0) | 5 (0) | 14 (0) | 103 (4) |
| 3 | (United States) Eric Leonard | 2019–2022 | 95 (1) | 1 (0) | 4 (0) | 0 (0) | 100 (1) |
| 4 | (Australia) Mitch Osmond | 2022–2025 | 80 (1) | 3 (0) | 2 (0) | 10 (1) | 95 (2) |
| 5 | (South Africa) Nazeem Bartman | 2022–2025 | 79 (11) | 1 (0) | 5 (2) | 7 (0) | 92 (13) |
| 6 | (Philippines) Bernd Schipmann | 2023–2025 | 73 (0) | 3 (0) | 1 (0) | 13 (0) | 90 (0) |
| 7 | (England) Aiden Mesias | 2023–2025 | 71 (6) | 0 (0) | 5 (0) | 12 (0) | 88 (6) |
| 8 | (United States) Timmy Mehl | 2023–2025 | 66 (0) | 2 (0) | 4 (0) | 11 (0) | 83 (0) |
| 9 | (United States) Connor Tobin | 2019–2021 | 69 (3) | 1 (0) | 3 (0) | 0 (0) | 73 (3) |
| 10 | (United States) Stephen Payne | 2023–2024 | 54 (3) | 3 (0) | 3 (0) | 9 (0) | 69 (3) |

==== Top goalscorers ====
Competitive matches only. Numbers in parentheses indicate appearances made.

| Rank | Player | Years | League | Playoffs | U.S. Open Cup | USL Cup | Total |
|---|---|---|---|---|---|---|---|
| 1 | **(United States) Derek Gebhard** | 2021– | 29 (145) | 1 (3) | 0 (5) | 2 (14) | 32 (167) |
| 2 | (United States) Christian Chaney | 2023–2024 | 16 (48) | 1 (3) | 2 (2) | 4 (9) | 23 (62) |
| 3 | **(Northern Ireland) Ryan Carmichael** | 2026– | 14 (32) | 0 (2) | 0 (1) | 2 (4) | 16 (39) |
| 4 | (South Africa) Nazeem Bartman | 2022–2025 | 11 (79) | 0 (1) | 2 (5) | 0 (7) | 13 (92) |
| 5 | (Colombia) Juan Galindrez | 2024–2025 | 7 (46) | 0 (2) | 2 (4) | 1 (13) | 10 (65) |
| 5 | (Jamaica) Don Smart | 2019–2020 | 9 (43) | 0 (1) | 1 (3) | 0 (0) | 10 (47) |
| 7 | (United States) Devin Boyce | 2024–2025 | 6 (43) | 1 (2) | 0 (3) | 2 (14) | 9 (62) |
| 7 | **(United States) Hakim Karamoko** | 2026– | 6 (18) | 2 (2) | 0 (0) | 1 (2) | 9 (22) |
| 9 | (Brazil) Lucca Dourado | 2025 | 8 (22) | 0 (0) | 0 (0) | 0 (2) | 8 (24) |
| 9 | (Brazil) Paulo Jr. | 2019–2020 | 8 (43) | 0 (1) | 0 (2) | 0 (0) | 8 (46) |

==== Top assist scorers ====
Competitive matches only. Numbers in parentheses indicate appearances made.

| Rank | Player | Years | League | Playoffs | U.S. Open Cup | USL Cup | Total |
|---|---|---|---|---|---|---|---|
| 1 | **(United States) Derek Gebhard** | 2021– | 12 (145) | 0 (3) | 0 (5) | 0 (14) | 12 (167) |
| 2 | (Brazil) Paulo Jr. | 2019–2020 | 9 (43) | 0 (1) | 2 (2) | 0 (0) | 11 (46) |
| 3 | **(United States) Roman Torres** | 2026– | 9 (30) | 0 (2) | 0 (1) | 1 (4) | 10 (37) |
| 4 | (Jamaica) Don Smart | 2019–2020 | 8 (43) | 0 (1) | 1 (3) | 0 (0) | 9 (47) |
| 5 | (South Africa) Nazeem Bartman | 2022–2025 | 7 (79) | 0 (1) | 0 (5) | 0 (7) | 7 (92) |
| 5 | (United States) Devin Boyce | 2024–2025 | 2 (43) | 1 (2) | 3 (3) | 1 (14) | 7 (62) |
| 5 | (England) Jayden Onen | 2023 | 6 (26) | 0 (0) | 1 (1) | 0 (0) | 7 (27) |
| 5 | (United States) Cyrus Rad | 2021–2022 | 6 (40) | 0 (0) | 1 (1) | 0 (0) | 7 (41) |
| 9 | **(Northern Ireland) Ryan Carmichael** | 2026– | 3 (32) | 3 (2) | 0 (1) | 0 (4) | 6 (39) |
| 9 | (United States) Christian Chaney | 2023–2024 | 5 (48) | 0 (3) | 0 (2) | 1 (9) | 6 (62) |
| 9 | (United States) Stephen Payne | 2023–2024 | 5 (54) | 1 (3) | 0 (3) | 0 (9) | 6 (69) |

==== Most clean sheets ====
Competitive matches only. Numbers in parentheses indicate appearances made.

| Rank | Player | Years | League | Playoffs | U.S. Open Cup | USL Cup | Total |
|---|---|---|---|---|---|---|---|
| 1 | (Philippines) Bernd Schipmann | 2023–2025 | 27 (73) | 2 (3) | 0 (1) | 4 (13) | 33 (90) |
| 2 | **(United States) JT Harms** | 2026– | 10 (31) | 0 (2) | 0 (0) | 0 (3) | 10 (36) |
| 3 | (Haiti) Brian Sylvestre | 2019 | 5 (16) | 0 (1) | 2 (3) | 0 (0) | 7 (20) |
| 4 | (United States) Phil Breno | 2021–2022 | 5 (39) | 0 (0) | 1 (2) | 0 (0) | 6 (41) |
| 5 | (Cuba) Raiko Arozarena | 2022 | 4 (16) | 0 (0) | 0 (0) | 0 (0) | 4 (16) |
| 5 | (United States) Chris Brady | 2020; 2021 | 4 (9) | 0 (0) | 0 (0) | 0 (0) | 4 (9) |

=== Captains ===
| Player | Years |
|---|---|
| (United States) Connor Tobin | 2019–2021 |
| (Australia) Mitch Osmond | 2022–2025 |
| (United States) Mark Segbers | 2026– |

== Honors ==
=== Club achievements ===
- USL Jägermeister Cup
  - Runners-up (1): 2024

=== Player honors ===
| Year | Pos. | Player | Awarder | Honor | Ref. |
|---|---|---|---|---|---|
| 2019 | DF | (Mexico) Christian Díaz | USL League One | First Team All-League | |
| 2019 | FW | (Brazil) Paulo Jr. | USL League One | Second Team All-League | |
| 2020 | GK | (United States) Chris Brady | USL League One | Young Player of the Year | |
| 2020 | DF | (United States) Connor Tobin | USL League One | Second Team All-League | |
| 2021 | MF | (Republic of Ireland) Aaron Molloy | USL League One | First Team All-League | |
| 2021 | DF | (United States) Connor Tobin | USL League One | Second Team All-League | |
| 2022 | DF | (United States) Mikey Maldonado | USL League One | Second Team All-League | |
| 2023 | DF | (Austria) Jake Crull | USL League One | Second Team All-League | |
| 2024 | MF | (United States) Devin Boyce | USL League One | First Team All-League | |
| 2024 | DF | (Australia) Mitch Osmond | USL League One | First Team All-League | |
| 2024 | MF | (United States) Jimmie Villalobos | USL League One | Second Team All-League | |
| 2025 | FW | (United States) Derek Gebhard | USL League One | Second Team All-League | |
| 2026 | FW | (Northern Ireland) Ryan Carmichael | USL League One | First Team All-League | |
| 2026 | FW | (Northern Ireland) Ryan Carmichael | USL Player's Association | Player's Choice Best XI | |
| 2026 | GK | (United States) JT Harms | USL League One | Second Team All-League | |
| 2026 | MF | (United States) Roman Torres | USL League One | Second Team All-League | |
