= 2024 Lexington SC season =

Lexington SC
2024 season
- Owners: Bill and Donna Shively Stephen Dawahare
- Head coach: Darren Powell
- Stadium: Toyota Stadium; Georgetown, Kentucky; Lexington SC Stadium; Lexington, Kentucky
- USL1: 9th
- USL1 playoffs: DNQ
- U.S. Open Cup: 1st Round
- USL Jägermeister Cup: Group Stage
Home colours	Away colours

The 2024 Lexington SC season was the club's second season since their establishment on October 5, 2021. The club competed in their second season in USL League One and was part of the inaugural USL1 in-season tournament. They made their 2nd ever appearance in the U.S. Open Cup on March 19, falling 3–4 to amateur USL League Two side Vermont Green FC in what was the first-ever cup match played in the state, and LSC became the first professional club to play a competitive match in Vermont.

== Staff ==
Position	Name
Head coach	(England) Darren Powell
Assistant coach	(Spain) Javier Cano
Director of Goalkeeping and USL1 Assistant Coach	(United States) Chris Barocas
Head of Performance	(United States) Ian Kossick
Director of Soccer Operations	(United States) Ryan Gallagher
Equipment Manager	(United States) Brandon Coldwell
Head Athletic Trainer	(United States) Taylor Spyker

== Season squad ==
Squad No.	Name	Nationality	Date of birth (age)
Goalkeepers
1	Austin Causey	(United States)	Aug 20, 2001 (22)
13	Amal Knight (C)	(Jamaica)	Nov 19, 1993 (30)
23	Nico Campuzano	(Spain)	Jan 29, 1998 (25)
Defenders
2	Tate Robertson	(United States)	May 31, 1997 (27)
4	Kimball Jackson	(United States)	Aug 2, 2004 (19)
3	Ebenezer Ackon	(Ghana)	Feb 12, 1996 (27)
5	Kaelon Fox	(United States)	May 31, 1995 (29)
12	Jorge Corrales (C)	(Cuba)	May 20, 1991 (32)
15	Anthony Patti	(Brazil)	Nov 28, 2002 (21)
16	CC Uche	(United States)	Mar 3, 1998 (26)
20	Daniel Chica (Departed club on July 11)	(United States)	Feb 18, 2002 (22)
21	Christian Lue Young	(United States)	Dec 9, 1996 (27)
44	Modesto Méndez	(Cuba)	Jan 6, 1998 (25)
74	Erick Ceja-Gonzalez	(United States)	Sep 1, 2001 (22)
88	Michael Agboola	(England)	Aug 15, 2001 (22)
Midfielders
6	Abel Caputo	(Venezuela)	Jul 11, 2000 (23)
8	Yannick Yankam	(Malta)	Dec 12, 1997 (26)
10	Jayden Onen	(England)	Feb 17, 2001 (22)
25	Pierre Mané	(Senegal)	Jun 16, 1998 (26)
32	Ates Diouf	(Senegal)	Mar 24, 2000 (24)
98	David Loera	(Mexico)	Sep 10, 1998 (25)
Forwards
7	Issac Cano (on loan from Louisville City)	(United States)	Mar 26, 2004 (19)
9	Azaad Liadi	(United States)	May 14, 1998 (25)
11	Alexis Cerritos	(El Salvador)	Oct 2, 2000 (23)
14	Khalid Balogun (Out on loan to Miami FC)	(United States)	Jul 25, 1998 (25)
17	Cameron Lancaster (C)	(England)	Nov 5, 1992 (31)
20	Kameron Lacey	(Jamaica)	January 16, 2001 (23)
77	Nico Brown	(Jamaica)	Aug 11, 1998 (25)

Last updated: August 23, 2024.
Source: Lexington SC

== Transfers ==
=== In ===
Pos.	Player	Signed from	Details	Date	Ref.
DF	(Cuba) Modesto Méndez	(United States) Hartford Athletic	Free transfer	December 15, 2023	
DF	(Ghana) Ebenezer Ackon	(United States) San Diego Loyal SC	Free transfer	December 18, 2023	
MF	(Venezuela) Abel Caputo	(United States) Tampa Bay Rowdies	Free transfer	December 20, 2023	
DF	(United States) Christian Lue Young	(United States) North Carolina FC	Free transfer	December 22, 2023	
DF	(United States) Anthony Patti	(United States) Albion San Diego	Free transfer	January 2, 2024	
MF	(England) Jayden Onen	(United States) Forward Madison FC	Free transfer	January 4, 2024	
MF	(Malta) Yannick Yankam	(Malta) Birkirkara F.C.	Free transfer	January 8, 2024	
DF	(England) Michael Agboola	(England) Hullbridge Sports FC	Free transfer	January 12, 2024	
GK	(Spain) Nico Campuzano	(United States) New England Revolution II	Free transfer	January 16, 2024	
DF	(Cuba) Jorge Corrales	(United States) FC Tulsa	Free transfer	January 17, 2024	
FW	(United States) Azaad Liadi	(United States) Huntsville City FC	Free transfer	January 19, 2024	
FW	(England) Cameron Lancaster	(United States) Louisville City FC	Free transfer	January 22, 2024	
MF	(Mexico) David Loera	(United States) San Antonio FC	Free transfer	January 26, 2024	
FW	(United States) Issac Cano	(United States) Louisville City FC	Season-Long Loan	February 2, 2024	
DF	(United States) Daniel Chica	(United States) Loudoun United	Upgraded from Trialist	March 27, 2024	
FW	(El Salvador) Alexis Cerritos	(United States) Huntsville City FC	Transfer	April 26, 2024	
DF	(United States) CC Uche	(United States) Minnesota United FC 2	Free Transfer	May 17, 2024	
FW	(Jamaica) Kameron Lacey	(United States) San Antonio FC	Season-Long Loan	August 23, 2024	

=== Out ===
Date	Pos.	Player	Transaction	Details	New Club	Ref.
December 1, 2023	MF	(England) Charlie Machell	Released	Contract expired	(United States) One Knoxville SC	
December 1, 2023	FW	(Australia) Will Baynham	Released	Contract expired	(Australia) Preston Lions FC	
December 1, 2023	DF	(England) Owen Green	Released	Contract expired	(United States) Chattanooga Red Wolves SC	
December 1, 2023	DF	(Tanzania) Diallo Irakoze	Released	Contract expired	(United States) Southern Indiana FC	
December 1, 2023	MF	(South Korea) Seo-In Kim	Released	Contract expired	(Cambodia) Life FC	
December 1, 2023	FW	(United States) Drew Patterson	Released	Contract expired		
December 1, 2023	FW	(United States) Jalen James	Released	Contract expired	(United States) Chattanooga FC	
December 1, 2023	MF	(Jamaica) Don Smart	Released	Contract expired		
December 1, 2023	DF	(Canada) Terique Mohammed	Released	Contract expired	(United States) Des Moines Menace	
December 1, 2023	DF	(United States) Cesar Murillo	Released	Contract expired	(United States) Chicago House AC	
December 1, 2023	GK	(United States) Luke Phillips	Released	Contract expired		
December 1, 2023	FW	(United States) Josh Head	Released	Contract expired	(United States) Bowling Green FC	
December 1, 2023	DF	(United States) Franky Martinez	Released	Contract expired		
January 1, 2024	MF	(South Africa) Phila Dlamini	Free agent	Announced on Instagram that he was leaving the club. No official press release by the club yet		
June 29, 2024	FW	(United States) Khalid Balogun	Out on Loan	Season long loan to USLC club Miami FC	(United States) Miami FC	
July 11, 2024	DF	(United States) Daniel Chica	Released	Club released PR statement stating that Chica had departed the club		

=== New contracts ===
Note - Kaelon Fox and Ates Diouf were signed on multi-year deals. Players are in the order of how the club announced their return on their social media platforms, starting on December 4th.

Date	Pos.	No.	Player	Details	Ref.
December 6, 2023	DF	17	(United States) Erick Ceja-Gonzalez	New contract for 2024	
December 6, 2023	DF	2	(United States) Tate Robertson	Option exercised	
December 6, 2023	GK	13	(Jamaica) Amal Knight	New contract for 2024	
December 6, 2023	GK	1	(United States) Austin Causey	New contract for 2024	
December 6, 2023	FW	14	(United States) Khalid Balogun	New contract for 2024	
December 6, 2023	FW	77	(Jamaica) Nico Brown	Option exercised	
December 6, 2023	DF	4	(United States) Kimball Jackson	New contract for 2024	
December 6, 2023	MF	25	(Senegal) Pierre Mané	New contract for 2024	

== Competitions ==
=== Preseason ===
USL1 Preseason Central

February 10, 2024 1	Columbus Crew 2	0-1	Lexington SC	Columbus, Ohio
1 PM EST		Report	Lancaster	Stadium: Unannounced

February 18, 2024 2	Louisville City FC	0-0	Lexington SC	Louisville, Kentucky
1 pm		Report		Stadium: Thurman Hutchins Park

February 24, 2024 3	Lexington SC	0-1	Indy Eleven	Lexington, Kentucky
12 PM EST		Report		Stadium: Lexington SC Training Grounds

February 24, 2024 4	Lexington SC	2-3	Cumberland Patriots	Lexington, Kentucky
2 PM EST	Cano	Report		Stadium: Lexington SC Training Grounds

March 2, 2024 5	Lexington SC	2-1	University of Kentucky Wildcats	Georgetown, Kentucky
4 PM EST	Diouf: Lue Young	Report	Not announced	Stadium: Toyota Stadium (Kentucky)

March 2, 2024 6	Lexington SC	2-0	Georgetown College Tigers	Georgetown, Kentucky
6 pm EST	Trailist #1: Jackson	Report		Stadium: Toyota Stadium (Kentucky)

=== USL League One ===
Pos	Team	Pld	W	L	T	GF	GA	GD	Pts	Qualification
7	(Washington (state)) Spokane Velocity FC	22	7	9	6	26	35	−9	27	Playoffs
8	(Virginia) Richmond Kickers	22	6	10	6	25	34	−9	24	Playoffs
9	(Kentucky) Lexington SC	22	5	11	6	33	42	−9	21	
10	(Georgia (U.S. state)) South Georgia Tormenta FC	22	4	10	8	33	42	−9	20	
11	(Tennessee) Chattanooga Red Wolves SC	22	5	14	3	28	48	−20	18	

Source: USL League One
Rules for classification: 1) points; 2) total wins; 3) total goal differential; 4) total goals scored; 5) points earned against top four Conference finishers; 6) disciplinary points; 7) drawing of lots.

Overall								Home						Away					
Pld	W	D	L	GF	GA	GD	Pts	W	D	L	GF	GA	GD	W	D	L	GF	GA	GD
14	3	5	6	18	26	−8	14	2	3	3	10	12	−2	1	2	3	8	14	−6

Source: Match reports

==== Results by round ====
Round	1	2	3	4	5	6	7	8	9	10	11	12	13	14	15	16	17	18	19	20	21	22
Stadium	H	H	A	H	A	H	A	A	H	H	H	A	A	H	A	H	H	A	A	A	H	A
Result	D	W	L	L	L	D	L	D	L	L	W	D	W	D								
Position	3	1	5	6	6	8	11	11	11	11	11	12	10	10								

Updated to match(es) played on March 9, 2024. Source: Match reports
A = Away; H = Home; W = Win; D = Draw; L = Loss

Matches

March 9, 2024 1	Lexington SC	0-0	Northern Colorado Hailstorm FC	Georgetown, Kentucky
7 pm EST	Corrales (yellow card) 58'; Méndez (yellow card) 86'	Report	Rendón (yellow card) 45+2'; Langlois (yellow card) 56'; Powder (yellow card) 80'	Stadium: Toyota Stadium (Kentucky); Attendance: 1,273; Referee: Gary Gutierrez; Assistant referees: Jackson Krauser; Eric Burton; Fourth official: Kevin Fikar; Man of the Match: Amal Knight

March 15, 2024 2	Lexington SC	1-0	Chattanooga Red Wolves SC	Georgetown, Kentucky
7 pm EST	Fox (yellow card) 47'; Robertson (yellow card) 61'; Onen (yellow card) 69'; Yankam 79'	Report	Gómez (yellow card) 44'; Hernández (yellow card) 89'; Folla (yellow card) 90+9'	Stadium: Toyota Stadium (Kentucky); Attendance: 1,041; Referee: Izlen Peksenar; Assistant referees: Scott Irwin; Laura Chambers Waliski; Fourth official: Donovan Eubank; Man of the Match: Amal Knight

March 23, 2024 3	One Knoxville SC	2-0	Lexington SC	Knoxville, Tennessee
6:30 PM EST	Haugli (yellow card) 66'; Castro Jr 70' (Kelly-Rosales); Johnson (yellow card) 76'; Ritchie 88' (Ballard)	Report	Lue Young (yellow card) 4'; Diouf (yellow card) 45'; Corrales (yellow card) 45'	Stadium: Regal Stadium; Attendance: 1,975; Referee: Ryan Farrell
Note: Battle of the Barrel Derby Match

March 29, 2023 4	Lexington SC	2-3	Greenville Triumph SC	Georgetown, Kentucky
7 pm EST	Fox (yellow card) 29' (goal) 90+8' (o.g.); Méndez (yellow card) 32'; Cano 45+4' (Diouf); Lancaster 57' (Liadi); Knight (yellow card) 80' (yellow-red card) 80'; Lue Young (yellow card) 90+16'	Report	Zakowski 65' (Smith); MacKinnon 84'; Herrera (yellow card) 90+2'	Stadium: Toyota Stadium (Kentucky); Attendance: 1,672; Referee: Olvin Oliva
Note: First ever USL League One Match on the CBS Golazo Network

April 6, 2024 5	Tormenta FC	3-0	Lexington SC	Statesboro, Georgia
	Rodriguez 8' (Khoury); Fonseca 26' (pen.); Dengler (yellow card) 56'; Kilwien (yellow card) 68'; Doyle (yellow card) 72'; Vivas 81' (Dengler); Ramos (yellow card) 84'	Report	Yankam (yellow card) 13'; Onen (yellow card) 66'	Stadium: Tormenta Stadium; Attendance: 1,024; Referee: Michael O'Reilly

April 14, 2024 6	Lexington SC	2-2	Spokane Velocity FC	Georgetown, Kentucky
4 pm EST	Yankam 26' (Caputo); Liadi 34' (Lue Young); Caputo (yellow card) 49'	Report	Longmire 19' (Gil); Gil 37' (Denton); Denton (yellow card) 64'; Longmire (yellow card) 67'	Stadium: Toyota Stadium (Kentucky); Attendance: 1,209; Referee: Joe Surgan

June 1, 2024 7	Forward Madison FC	4-1	Lexington SC	Madison, Wisconsin
	Chaney 3' (Gebhard) 20'; Mesias 9'; Mehl (yellow card) 50'; Schipmann (yellow card) 84'; Murphy 90+2' (Galindrez) (yellow card) 90+3'	Report	Diouf (yellow card) 26'; Caputo (yellow card) 31'; Balogun (yellow card) 45+5' (goal) 56' (pen.); Ackon (yellow card) 59'	Stadium: Breese Stevens Field; Attendance: 4,556; Referee: Lukasz Jozefecki

June 23, 2024 8	Spokane Velocity FC	1-1	Lexington SC	Spokane, Washington
9 pm EST	Dolling 48' (Akale) (yellow card) 79'; Fernandez (yellow card) 75'; Longmire (yellow card) 75'	Report	Brown 27' (Diouf); Corrales (yellow card) 59' (yellow-red card) 83'; Onen (yellow card) 70'; Chica (yellow card) 90+3'	Stadium: One Spokane Stadium; Attendance: 4,004; Referee: Yannick Rothfuss

July 6, 2024 9	Lexington SC	2-4	Union Omaha	Georgetown, Kentucky
7 pm EST	Méndez (yellow card) 7'; Uche (yellow card) 38'; Caputo 39' (o.g.); Liadi (yellow card) 59'; Brown 63' (Cerritos)	Report	Dolabella 9' (pen.); Dos Santos 20' (Kunga) 34' (Gómez); Malone (yellow card) 27' (goal) 90+4' (o.g.)	Stadium: Toyota Stadium (Kentucky); Attendance: 1,135; Referee: Erick Lezama

July 13, 2024 10	Lexington SC	1-2	Tormenta FC	Georgetown, Kentucky
7 pm EST	Diouf 45+1' (yellow card) 60'; Robertson (yellow card) 56'; Méndez (yellow card) 59'; Caputo (yellow card) 74'; Brown (yellow card) 80'; Yankam (yellow card) 86'	Report	Dengler (yellow card) 25'; Khoury (yellow card) 49'; Kilwien (yellow card) 59'; Vivas 66' (Fonseca) (yellow card) 90+4'; Spengler (yellow card) 78' (yellow-red card) 90+3'; Hasan (yellow card) 82'; Fonseca 87' (Akoto) (yellow card) 88'	Stadium: Toyota Stadium (Kentucky); Attendance: 1,156; Referee: Lukasz Jozefecki

July 27, 2024 11	Lexington SC	2-1	Richmond Kickers	Georgetown, Kentucky
7 pm EST	Liadi 40' (Yankam) (yellow card) 54'; Diof 48' (Brown) (yellow card) 67'; Powell (Bench) (yellow card) 73'; Cano (yellow card) 89'	Report	França (yellow card) 24'; Vaughan (yellow card) 44'; Billhardt 46'; O'Dwyer (yellow card) 51'	Stadium: Toyota Stadium (Kentucky); Attendance: 1,143; Referee: Edson Carvajal

August 3, 2024 12	Charlotte Independence	3-3	Lexington SC	Charlotte, North Carolina
7 pm EST	Ciss (yellow card) 31'; Obertan 45+1' (Sorenson); Ndiaye (yellow card) 68' (goal) 85' (Sorenson); Mbuyu (yellow card) 75'; Obregón Jr. 87'	Report	Lancaster 27'; Diouf 39' (Cerritos); Lue Young 45' (Yankam) (yellow card) 90+4'; Corrales (yellow card) 71'; Méndez (yellow card) 90+5'	Stadium: American Legion Memorial Stadium; Attendance: 996; Referee: Joe Surgan

August 16, 2024 13	Central Valley Fuego FC	1-3	Lexington SC	Fresno, California
11 pm EST	Heckenberg (yellow card) 42'; Midence (yellow card) 48'; Vineberg (yellow card) 76'; Carrera-García 83'	Report	Lancaster 4' (Diouf); Knight (yellow card) 40'; Diouf 43' (Yankam); Cerritos 54'	Stadium: Fresno State Soccer Stadium; Attendance: 1,097; Referee: Christopher Calderon

August 24, 2024 14	Lexington SC	0-0	Forward Madison FC	Georgetown, Kentucky
7 pm EST	Corrales (yellow card) 45+1'; Méndez (yellow card) 45+5'; Caputo (yellow card) 66'	Report	McLaughlin (yellow card) 53'; Chilaka (yellow card) 54'; Cichero (red card) 80'; Boyce (yellow card) 90+3'	Stadium: Toyota Stadium (Kentucky); Attendance: 1,098; Referee: Amin Hadzic

September 7, 2024 15	Northern Colorado Hailstorm FC	5-1	Lexington SC	Windsor, Colorado
		Report		Stadium: Future Legends Complex; Attendance: 1,063

September 13, 2024 16	Lexington SC	0-1	One Knoxville SC	Lexington, Kentucky
		Report		Stadium: Lexington SC Stadium; Attendance: 2,416

September 18, 2024 17	Lexington SC	7-1	Central Valley Fuego FC	Lexington, Kentucky
		Report		Stadium: Lexington SC Stadium; Attendance: 1,531

September 21, 2024 18	Richmond Kickers	3-0	Lexington SC	Richmond, Virginia
		Report		Stadium: City Stadium; Attendance: 5,067

October 5, 2024 19	Greenville Triumph SC	2-1	Lexington SC	Clemson, South Carolina
		Report		Stadium: Riggs Field; Attendance: Behind Closed Doors

October 12, 2024 20	Union Omaha	2-1	Lexington SC	Papillion, Nebraska
		Report		Stadium: Werner Park; Attendance: 4,509

October 19, 2024 21	Lexington SC	2-2	Charlotte Independence	Lexington, Kentucky
		Report		Stadium: Lexington SC Stadium; Attendance: 3,125

October 26, 2024 22	Chattanooga Red Wolves SC	0-3	Lexington SC	East Ridge, Tennessee
		Report		Stadium: CHI Memorial Stadium; Attendance: 2,432

=== USL Jägermeister Cup ===
Pos	Team	Pld	W	PKW	PKL	L	GF	GA	GD	Pts	Qualification
1	Forward Madison FC	8	5	1	0	2	10	8	+2	17	Advanced to knockout stage
2	One Knoxville SC	8	4	1	1	2	8	7	+1	15	
3	Lexington SC	8	3	2	1	2	10	10	0	14	
4	Chattanooga Red Wolves SC	8	1	1	1	5	10	15	−5	6	

Source: USL League One

April 28, 2024 1-GS	Lexington SC	1-0	Forward Madison FC	Georgetown, Kentucky
4 pm EST	Onen (yellow card) 45+4'; Robertson (red card) 56'; Yankam (yellow card) 79' (yellow-red card) 88'; Bench (yellow card) 80'; Fox 90+4' (Corrales)	Report	Dávila (yellow card) 21'; Mesias (yellow card) 21'; Boyce (yellow card) 53'; Crull (yellow card) 90+3'	Stadium: Toyota Stadium (Kentucky); Attendance: 1,296; Referee: Nickrod Fateh

May 11, 2024 2	Lexington SC	2-2 (4-1 p)	Central Valley Fuego FC	Georgetown, Kentucky
7 pm EST	Lancaster 8'; Diouf 22' (Caputo); Caputo (yellow card) 88'	Report	Heckenberg (red card) 5'; Torr (yellow card) 54'; Midence 65'; Mendiola 90+2' (Midence)	Stadium: Toyota Stadium (Kentucky); Attendance: 1,210; Referee: DeShun Beard
	Penalties
	Caputo (penalty scored); Onen (penalty scored); Cerritos (penalty scored); Corrales (penalty scored)		(penalty missed) Mendiola; (penalty missed) Midence; (penalty scored) Cromwell
Note: For the USL Cup, matches that end in a draw go instantly to PKs to determine which side gets an extra point in the group table

May 25, 2024 3-GS	Chattanooga Red Wolves SC	3-4	Lexington SC	East Ridge, Tennessee
7:30 PM EST	Malango 8' 58'; Folla (yellow card) 32'; Marsh 38' (Malango); Fernandes (yellow card) 52'; O. Hernandez (red card) 75'; Watters (yellow card) 75'; Bush (yellow card) 89'	Report	Diouf 35' (Onen); Cerritos 55' (Lue Young); Lue Young (yellow card) 60'; Ackon (yellow card) 74'; Lancaster (yellow card) 78' (goal) 90+6' (Diouf); Brown 90+2'	Stadium: CHI Memorial Stadium; Attendance: 2,308; Referee: Erick Lezama

June 8, 2024 4-GS	One Knoxville SC	2-0	Lexington SC	Knoxville, Tennessee
7 pm EST	Crisler (yellow card) 20' (goal) 50' (Johnson); Johnson (yellow card) 57'; Adjei (yellow card) 63'; Ross 75' (Ritchie) (yellow card) 90+1'	Report	Caputo (yellow card) 32'; Cerritos (yellow card) 37'; Ackon (red card) 59'; Brown (yellow card) 90+1'	Stadium: Regal Stadium; Attendance: 1,955; Referee: Rafael Santos

June 29, 2024 5	Greenville Triumph SC	0-1	Lexington SC	Greenville, South Carolina
7 pm EST	Velásquez (yellow card) 12'; Wu (yellow card) 44' (yellow-red card) 59'; Greenville Bench (yellow card) 60'	Report	Diouf 2' (yellow card) 55'; Méndez (yellow card) 61'; Liadi (yellow card) 76'; Caputo (yellow card) 82'; Robertson (yellow card) 90'; Mané (yellow card) 90'	Stadium: Paladin Stadium; Attendance: 2,077; Referee: DeShun Beard
Note: Liadi wore #24 in this match due to his #9 jersey being left back in Lexington

July 20, 2024 6-GS	Forward Madison FC	1-0	Lexington SC	Madison, Wisconsin
8 pm EST	Prentice 77' (Osmond) (yellow card) 90+3'; Glaeser (yellow card) 88'; Chaney (yellow card) 90+5'	Report	Uche (yellow card) 40'; Powell (yellow card) 90+6'	Stadium: Breese Stevens Field; Attendance: 3,571; Referee: Ryan Shanklin
Note: Debut of the black goalkeeper kit for Lexington SC

August 10, 2024 7-GS	Lexington SC	TBD (5-3 p)	One Knoxville SC	Lexington, Kentucky
7 pm EST	Caputo (yellow card) 18'; Brown (yellow card) 35'	Report	Tekiela (yellow card) 37'; Johnson (yellow card) 45+5'; Castro Jr. (yellow card) 54'	Stadium: Toyota Stadium (Kentucky); Attendance: 1,173; Referee: Stearne Briem
	Penalties
	Caputo (penalty scored); Diouf (penalty scored); Loera (penalty scored); Liadi (penalty scored); Brown (penalty scored)		Skelton (penalty scored); Fernandez (penalty scored); Adjei (penalty missed); Calixtro (penalty scored)
Note: Kaelon Fox eclipsed 100 appearances within USL1 with his appearance in the 31st minute to replace an injured CC Uche

August 31, 2024 8-GS	Lexington SC	2-2 (9-10 p)	Chattanooga Red Wolves SC	Georgetown, Kentucky
7 pm EST	Cerritos 1' (Brown); Lancaster 26' (Lue Young); Caputo (yellow card) 44'; Brown (yellow card) 85' (yellow-red card) 90'	Report	Ualefi (yellow card) 35'; Fernandes (yellow card) 42'; Green (red card) 45+1'; Folla (yellow card) 56' (goal) 90+2' (Jnohope); O.Hernandez 66'; Paez (yellow card) 89'	Stadium: Toyota Stadium (Kentucky); Attendance: 1,087
	Penalties
	Cano (penalty scored) (penalty missed); Cerritos (penalty scored); Corrales (penalty scored); Robertson (penalty scored); Fox (penalty missed); Ceja-Gonzalez (penalty scored); Lacey (penalty scored); Méndez (penalty scored); Mané (penalty scored); Knight (penalty scored)		(penalty missed) (penalty scored) Coutinho; (penalty scored) Mensah; (penalty scored) Paez; (penalty scored) Plascencia; (penalty scored) Cvetanović; (penalty scored) P.Hernández; (penalty scored) Jnohope; (penalty scored) Folla; (penalty scored) Watters; (penalty scored) Bush
Note: The match experienced a 3-hour weather delay and kicked off at 10:15 pm

=== U.S. Open Cup ===
Lexington SC will travel to Burlington, Vermont for their 2nd ever U.S. Open Cup game in club history as they take on Vermont Green FC of USL League Two. According to available records, the matchup is set to make history as the first ever Open Cup match to be played in the state of Vermont, and Lexington SC will be the first professional club to play a competitive game in the state.

March 19, 2024 2024 U.S. Open Cup	Vermont Green FC	4-3	Lexington SC (Kentucky)	Burlington, Vermont
7 pm EST	Barret 5' (Lockermann); Lockermann 10' (Banzini); Labovitz 24' (Céspedes); Ashford 50'; Prego (yellow card) 83'	Report	Cano 20' (Onen); Lancaster 60' 78' (Méndez) (yellow card) 86'; Liadi (yellow card) 66'	Stadium: Virtue Field; Attendance: 4,500; Referee: Brendan Fanning

== Player statistics ==
=== Goals ===
Place	Pos.	No.	Name	USL1	USL1 Cup	USOC	Total
1	ST	17	(England) Cameron Lancaster	3	2	2	7
1	FW	32	(Senegal) Ates Diouf	4	3	0	7
2	FW	77	(Jamaica) Nico Brown	2	1	0	3
3	FW	7	(United States) Issac Cano	1	0	1	2
3	MF	8	(Malta) Yannick Yankam	2	0	0	2
3	FW	9	(United States) Azaad Liadi	2	0	0	2
3	FW	11	(El Salvador) Alexis Cerritos	1	1	0	2
4	DF	4	(United States) Kaelon Fox	0	1	0	1
4	FW	14	(United States) Khalid Balogun	1	0	0	1
4	DF	21	(United States) Christian Lue Young	1	0	0	1
Total				13	8	3	24

=== Assists ===
Place	Pos.	No.	Name	USL1	USL1 Cup	USOC	Total
1	FW	32	(Senegal) Ates Diouf	3	1	0	4
2	MF	8	(Malta) Yannick Yankam	3	0	0	3
3	MF	6	(Venezuela) Abel Caputo	1	1	0	2
3	MF	10	(England) Jayden Onen	0	1	1	2
3	DF	21	(United States) Christian Lue Young	1	1	0	2
3	FW	9	(United States) Azaad Liadi	2	0	0	2
3	FW	11	(El Salvador) Alexis Cerritos	2	0	0	2
4	DF	44	(Cuba) Modesto Méndez	0	0	1	1
4	DF	12	(Cuba) Jorge Corrales	0	1	0	1
4	FW	77	(Jamaica) Nico Brown	1	0	0	1
Total				8	5	2	15

=== Clean sheets ===
Place	Pos.	No.	Name	USL1	USL1 Cup	USOC	Total
1	GK	13	(Jamaica) Amal Knight	3	3	0	6
Total				3	3	0	6

=== Disciplinary ===
No.	Pos.	Name	USL1		USL1 Cup		U.S. Open Cup		Total	
No.	Pos.	Name	Booked	Sent off (straight red)	Booked	Sent off (straight red)	Booked	Sent off (straight red)	Booked	Sent off (straight red)
5	DF	(United States) Kaelon Fox	2				-	-	2	
32	MF	(Senegal) Ates Diouf	4		1		-	-	5	
13	GK	(Jamaica) Amal Knight	3	1			-	-	3	1
2	DF	(United States) Tate Robertson	2		1	1	-	-	3	1
25	MF	(Senegal) Pierre Mané			1		-	-	1	
4	DF	(United States) Kimball Jackson					-	-		
14	FW	(United States) Khalid Balogun	1				-	-		
77	FW	(Jamaica) Nico Brown	1		2		-	-	1	
74	DF	(United States) Erick Ceja-Gonzalez					-	-		
1	GK	(United States) Austin Causey					-	-		
44	DF	(Cuba) Modesto Méndez	6		1		-	-	7	
3	DF	(Ghana) Ebenezer Ackon	1		1	1	-	-	2	1
6	MF	(Venezuela) Abel Caputo	4		4		-	-	8	
21	DF	(United States) Christian Lue Young	3		1		-	-	3	
15	DF	(Brazil) Anthony Patti					-	-		
10	MF	(England) Jayden Onen	4		1		-	-	4	
8	MF	(Malta) Yannick Yankam	3		2	1	-	-	5	1
88	DF	(England) Michael Agboola					-	-		
23	GK	(Spain) Nico Campuzano					-	-		
12	DF	(Cuba) Jorge Corrales	6	1			-	-	6	1
9	FW	(United States) Azaad Liadi	2		1		1	-	4	
17	FW	(England) Cameron Lancaster			1		1	-	2	
98	MF	(Mexico) David Loera					-	-		
7	FW	(United States) Issac Cano	1				-	-	1	
20	FW	(United States) Daniel Chica	1				-	-		
11	FW	(El Salvador) Alexis Cerritos			1		-	-		
16	DF	(United States) CC Uche	1		1		-	-	2	
Total			47	2	19	3	2	0	66	5

== League Honors ==
USL League One

- Team of the WeeK
  - Amal Knight – Week 1, 2
  - Jorge Corrales – Week 1, 4
  - Yannick Yankam – Week 1, 2, 6, 17
  - Cameron Lancaster - Week 4, 17
  - Azaad Liadi - Week 6
  - Khalid Balogun - Week 10
  - Nico Brown - Week 12
  - Ates Diouf - Week 14, 17
  - Alexis Cerritos - Week 17
  - Darren Powell - Coach of the Week 17

USL Jägermeister Cup

- Team of the Round
  - Amal Knight – Round 1, 5
  - Jorge Corrales - Round 1, 7
  - Kaelon Fox - Round 1
  - Ates Diouf - Round 3
  - Jayden Onen - Round 3
  - Cameron Lancaster - Round 3
  - Amal Knight - Round 7
  - Darren Powell - Coach of Round 1, 5
- Save of the Round
  - Amal Knight - Round 6
