= 2023 Lexington SC season =

Lexington SC 2023 season

Lexington SC
2023 season
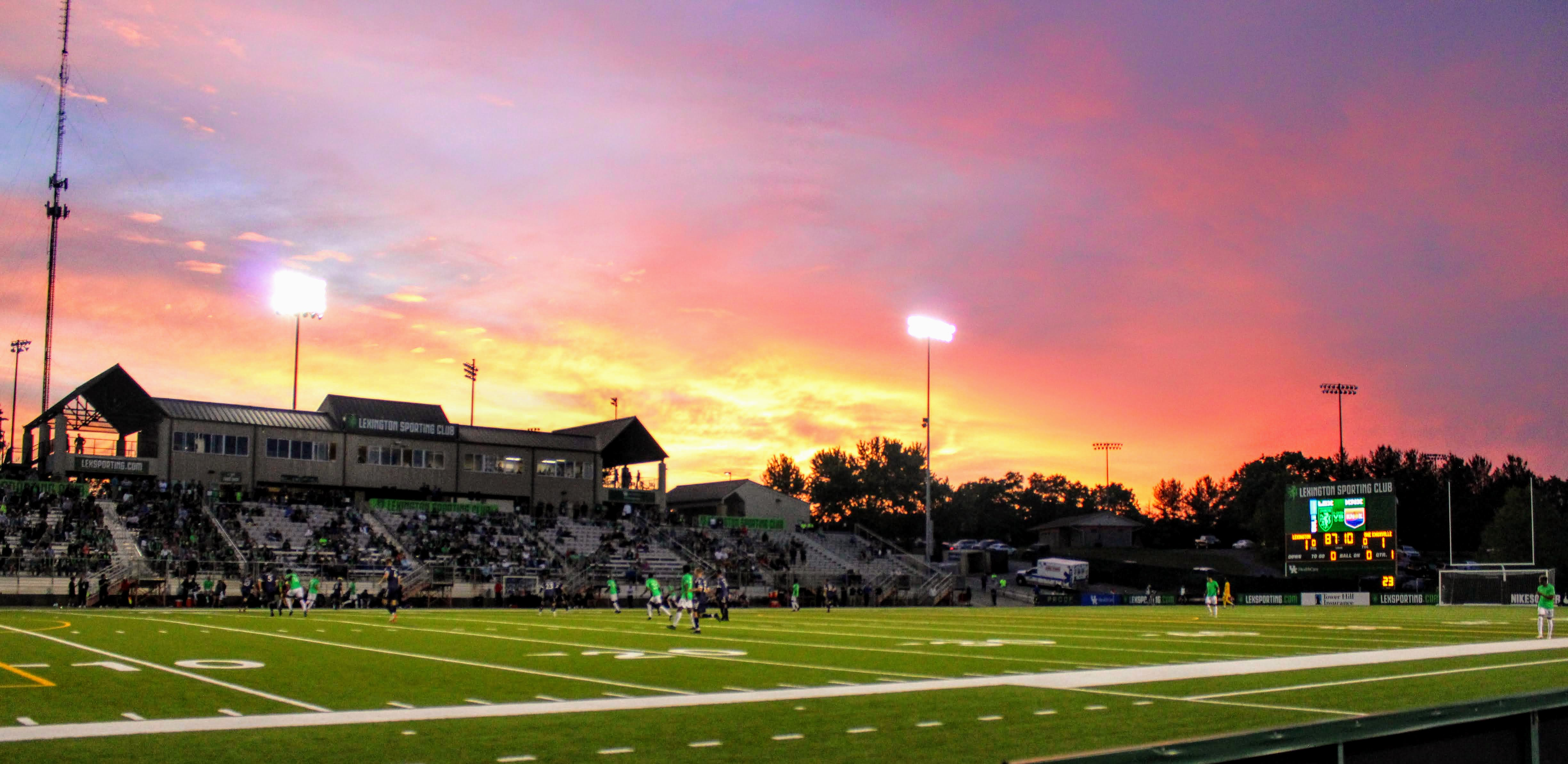
- 2023 Toyota Stadium - LSC v. One Knox
- President: Bill and Donna Shively Stephen Dawahare Carter Carnegie
- Manager: Sam Stockley and Nacho Novo (interim)
- Stadium: Toyota Stadium; Georgetown, Kentucky
- USL Championship: 9th
- USL1 playoffs: Did not qualify
- U.S. Open Cup: Round 2
- Top goalscorer: Ates Diouf (15)
- Highest home attendance: 3,029 (04/08 vs. Forward Madison FC)
- Lowest home attendance: 1,911 (9/17 vs. Charlotte Independence)
- Average home league attendance: 2232
- Biggest win: LSC 3–0 OMA (7/22)
- Biggest defeat: TOR 5–1 LSC (7/02)
Home colours	Away colours	Third colours

The 2023 Lexington SC season was the club's first season since their establishment on October 5, 2021. The club made its league debut in the USL League One as well as its domestic cup debut in the U.S. Open Cup.

== Background ==
On October 5, 2021, the United Soccer League announced that Tower Hill Sports had been granted a USL League One expansion team in Lexington to start play in the 2023 season. Tentatively named "Lexington Pro Soccer," the team revealed its official colors, crest, and branding as Lexington Sporting Club on March 22, 2022. The club named Sporting Director Sam Stockley as the club's first ever head coach on October 13, 2022. Following this announcement, the team announced that Warren Goodhind would be joining the coaching staff as the First Assistant Coach on October 18, 2022. On November 15, the team announced that Rangers F.C. legend Nacho Novo would be joining the coaching staff as an assistant coach and head coach of the U-23 squad. Connor Talbot was appointed the Head of Goalkeeping and the goalkeeping coach for the squad in September 2022.

== Coaching change ==
In the afternoon of September 17, before their matchup against the Charlotte Independence, the club announced that head coach Sam Stockley would be stepping down from his role to focus on being the club's sporting director full-time. Nacho Novo was promoted to interim manager for the remaining 5 matches. The club's president Vince Gabbert, was quoted as saying the following about the move -

“With our youth academy continuing to grow and permanent facilities coming to fruition, the Sporting Director role will require Sam’s full attention for the long-term success of this club,” Gabbert said. “Our original plan was for Sam’s dual role as Head Coach and Sporting Director to be short-term. Sam has been an integral part of the formation of Lexington SC and one of its centerpieces since the beginning. We can’t thank him enough for putting this club on the path to success.”

== Season squad ==
Squad No.	Name	Nationality	Date of birth (age)
Goalkeepers
1	Austin Causey	(United States)	Aug 20, 2001 (21)
13	Amal Knight	(Jamaica)	Nov 19, 1993 (29)
44	Luke Phillips^	(United States)	Oct 25, 2006 (16)
Defenders
2	Tate Robertson	(United States)	May 31, 1997 (26)
3	Owen Green	(England)	Sep 9, 1998 (24)
4	Kimball Jackson	(United States)	Aug 2, 2004 (18)
5	Kaelon Fox	(United States)	May 31, 1995 (28)
17	Erick Ceja-Gonzalez	(United States)	Sep 1, 2001 (21)
20	Diallo Irakoze	(Tanzania)	Feb 10, 2001 (22)
26	Cesar Murillo	(United States)	Feb 16, 1996 (27)
33	Franky Martinez	(United States)	Aug 9, 1995 (27)
57	Terique Mohammed	(Canada)	Jan 27, 2000 (23)
Midfielders
8	Charlie Machell (C)	(England)	Oct 25, 1994 (28)
10	Don Smart	(Jamaica)	Dec 2, 1987 (35)
11	Seo-In Kim "SoSo"	(South Korea)	Apr 18, 1995 (28)
22	Phila Dlamini	(South Africa)	Feb 26, 1999 (24)
25	Pierre Mané	(Senegal)	Jun 16, 1998 (25)
32	Ates Diouf	(Senegal)	Mar 24, 2000 (23)
Forwards
7	Jalen James	(United States)	May 10, 2000 (23)
9	Will Baynham	(Australia)	Jun 13, 1997 (26)
14	Khalid Balogun	(United States)	Jul 25, 1998 (24)
18	Drew Patterson	(United States)	Apr 20, 2001 (22)
77	Nico Brown	(Jamaica)	Aug 11, 1998 (24)
80	Josh Head	(United States)	Jan 6, 2004 (19)

^ - Lexington SC Academy Contract

Last updated: December 15, 2023.
Source: Lexington SC, League One stats

== Transfers ==
=== In ===
Pos.	Player	Previous club	Details	Date	Source
DF	(United States) Kaelon Fox	(United States) FC Tucson	Free Transfer	January 9, 2023	
MF	(Senegal) Ates Diouf	(United States) San Antonio FC	Free Transfer	January 10, 2023	
MF	(England) Charlie Machell	(United States) FC Tucson	Free Transfer	January 10, 2023	
GK	(Jamaica) Amal Knight	(Jamaica) Harbour View F.C.	Free Transfer	January 11, 2023	
DF	(United States) Tate Robertson	(United States) Chattanooga FC	Free Transfer	January 12, 2023	
FW	(Australia) Will Baynham	(Scotland) Queen's Park F.C.	Free Transfer	January 12, 2023	
DF	(England) Owen Green	(United States) South Georgia Tormenta FC	Free Transfer	January 13, 2023	
MF	(Senegal) Pierre Mané	(United States) Virginia Commonwealth Rams	Free Transfer	January 16, 2023	
DF	(United States) Kimball Jackson	(United States) Xavier Musketeers	Free Transfer	January 17, 2023	
FW	(United States) Khalid Balogun	(United States) Maryland Bobcats FC	Free Transfer	January 17, 2023	
DF	(Tanzania) Diallo Irakoze	(United States) Lexington SC Academy	Free Transfer	January 18, 2023	
DF	(United States) Franky Martinez	(United States) Chattanooga FC	Free Transfer	January 18, 2023	
MF	(South Africa) Phila Dlamini	(United States) Saginaw Valley State Cardinals	Free Transfer	January 19, 2023	
FW	(Jamaica) Nico Brown	(United States) Greenville Triumph SC	Free Transfer	January 20, 2023	
MF	(South Korea) Seo-In Kim "SoSo"	(United States) Chicago House AC	Free Transfer	January 23, 2023	
FW	(United States) Drew Patterson	(United States) Cal Poly Mustangs	Free Transfer	January 23, 2023	
FW	(United States) Jalen James	(United States) Campbell Fighting Camels	Free Transfer	January 24, 2023	
DF	(United States) Erick Ceja-Gonzalez	(United States) Reno United	Free Transfer	January 25, 2023	
GK	(United States) Austin Causey	(United States) Richmond Kickers	Free Transfer	January 25, 2023	
MF	(Jamaica) Don Smart	(United States) Greenville Triumph SC	Free Transfer	January 26, 2023	
DF	(Canada) Terique Mohammed	(Canada) FC Edmonton	Free Transfer	January 27, 2023	
DF	(United States) Cesar Murillo	(United States) Forward Madison FC	Free Transfer	March 15, 2023	
GK	(United States) Luke Phillips	(United States) Lexington SC Academy	Academy Contract	March 28, 2023	
FW	(United States) Josh Head	(United States) FC Cincinnati 2	Free Transfer	August 29, 2023	

== Competitions ==
=== Preseason ===
Lexington SC played five preseason exhibition matches in preparation of their first season.

February 11, 2023	Cumberlands Patriots	0–2	Lexington SC	Williamsburg, Kentucky
EST		Report	Ceja-Gonzalez 3rd session' (Mohammed); Brown 3rd session' (Balogun)	Stadium: UC Lacrosse/Soccer Complex
Note: Match was played as 3 30-minute sessions

February 18, 2023	Columbus Crew 2	2–0	Lexington SC	Columbus, Ohio
3:45 pm EST	Not reported by team	Report		Stadium: Indoor Facility (unknown location)

February 26, 2023	Georgetown Tigers	1–2	Lexington SC	Lexington, Kentucky
12:00 pm EST	Not reported by team	Report	Baynham 1st half' (Brown); Brown 2nd half' (Irakoze)	Stadium: Pat Deacon Stadium

March 4, 2023	Chattanooga Red Wolves SC	1–1	Lexington SC	East Ridge, Tennessee
4:30 pm EST	Trialist 1st half'	Report	Patterson 2nd half' (Robertson)	Stadium: CHI Memorial Stadium

March 11, 2023	Kentucky Wildcats	3–2	Lexington SC	Lexington, Kentucky
3:00 pm EST	Player Unknown <15'; Player Unknown 1st half' (pen.); Player Unknown >70'	Report	Baynham 15' (Mané); Fox 55' (Mohammed)	Stadium: Wendell & Vickie Bell Soccer Complex

=== USL League One ===
Pos	Team	Pld	W	L	T	GF	GA	GD	Pts	Qualification
1	Union Omaha (S)	32	19	5	8	61	41	+20	65	Qualification for the semi-finals
2	North Carolina FC (C)	32	19	7	6	58	39	+19	63	Qualification for the semi-finals
3	Northern Colorado Hailstorm FC	32	18	6	8	59	37	+22	62	Qualification for the play-offs
4	Charlotte Independence	32	13	9	10	50	42	+8	49	Qualification for the play-offs
5	Greenville Triumph SC	32	13	10	9	45	40	+5	48	Qualification for the play-offs
6	Forward Madison FC	32	11	11	10	38	40	−2	43	Qualification for the play-offs
7	Tormenta FC	32	12	14	6	55	56	−1	42	
8	One Knoxville SC	32	9	12	11	36	39	−3	38	
9	Lexington SC	32	7	14	11	46	57	−11	32	
10	Chattanooga Red Wolves SC	32	8	17	7	46	65	−19	31	
11	Richmond Kickers	32	6	15	11	42	55	−13	29	
12	Central Valley Fuego FC	32	6	21	5	36	61	−25	23	

Source: USL League One
Rules for classification: 1) points; 2) total wins; 3) total goal differential; 4) total goals scored; 5) points earned against top four Conference finishers; 6) disciplinary points; 7) drawing of lots.
(C) Champions; (S) Players' Shield winner

Overall								Home						Away					
Pld	W	D	L	GF	GA	GD	Pts	W	D	L	GF	GA	GD	W	D	L	GF	GA	GD
32	7	11	14	46	57	−11	32	6	6	4	24	24	0	1	5	10	22	33	−11

Source: Match reports

==== Results by round ====
Round	1	2	3	4	5	6	7	8	9	10	11	12	13	14	15	16	17	18	19	20	21	22	23	24	25	26	27	28	29	30	31	32
Stadium	H	A	H	H	H	A	H	A	H	H	A	H	A	A	H	A	A	H	H	A	A	H	A	H	H	A	A	H	H	A	H	A
Result	L	L	D	W	L	L	W	L	D	D	D	W	D	L	L	L	L	W	D	L	W	W	L	W	D	L	D	D	L	D	L	D
Position	9	10	12	11	10	10	11	11	11	10	11	11	11	9	10	10	10	10	10	10	10	10	10	10	9	10	10	9	9	9	9	9

Updated to match(es) played on December 6, 2023. Source: Match reports
A = Away; H = Home; W = Win; D = Draw; L = Loss

==== Matches ====
March 18, 2023 1	One Knoxville SC	2–1	Lexington SC	Knoxville, Tennessee
7:00 PM EST	Villalobos 17' (pen.) (yellow card) 90+5'; van der Pluijm (yellow card) 23'; Keegan 40'; Lewis (yellow card) 45+1'; Kelly-Rosales (yellow card) 67'; Ross (yellow card) 86'	Report	Smart 28' (pen.) (red card) 70'; Balogun (yellow card) 52'; Mohammed (yellow card) 61'	Stadium: Regal Stadium; Attendance: 2,512; Referee: Sergii Demianchuk
Note: Kickoff was delayed 30 minutes due to an issue with the stadium flood lights

April 1, 2023 2	North Carolina FC	2–1	Lexington SC	Seaside, California
7:00 PM EST	Mentzingen (yellow card) 40' (goal) 73' (Anderson); Navarro (yellow card) 47'; Lue Young (yellow card) 53'; Holliday (yellow card) 89'	Report	Balogun 5' (Robertson) (yellow card) 26'; Green 48' (o.g.); Brown (yellow card) 18'; Martinez (yellow card) 30'	Stadium: Cardinale Stadium; Attendance: 1,423; Referee: Shawn Tehini

April 8, 2023 3	Lexington SC	0–0	Forward Madison FC	Georgetown, Kentucky
7:00 PM EST	Machell (yellow card) 60'; Balogun (yellow card) 68'	Report	Mesias (yellow card) 48'; Osmond (yellow card) 65'; Cichero (yellow card) 71'	Stadium: Toyota Stadium (Kentucky); Attendance: 3,029; Referee: John Matto

April 15, 2023 4	Lexington SC	2–1	Tormenta FC	Georgetown, Kentucky
7:00 PM EST	Brown 15' (Diouf); Mohammed (yellow card) 30'; Diouf (yellow card) 59'; Green 71' (Dlamini); Fox (yellow card) 87'; Robertson (yellow card) 89'; Balogun (yellow card) 90+3'	Report	Khoury 53' (pen.); Otieno (yellow card) 67'; Kilwien (yellow card) 90+7'	Stadium: Toyota Stadium (Kentucky); Attendance: 2,621; Referee: Benjamin Meyer

April 22, 2023 5	Lexington SC	0–2	Greenville Triumph SC	Georgetown, Kentucky
7:00 PM EST	Murillo (red card) 27'; Green (yellow card) 59'; Fox (yellow card) 66'	Report	Coutinho (yellow card) 36'; Pilato 37'; Polak (yellow card) 49'; Shaw (yellow card) 62'; Castro 90+4' (Mackinnon)	Stadium: Toyota Stadium (Kentucky); Attendance: 2,260; Referee: Alex Beehler

April 29, 2023 6	Chattanooga Red Wolves SC	3–1	Lexington SC	East Ridge, Tennessee
7:30 PM EST	Varela (yellow card) 51'; Paoli (yellow card) 59'; Cardona 80'; Mensah 82'; Madrid (yellow card) 84'; Malango 90+6' (Liborio Jr.)	Report	Fox (yellow card) 5'; Machell (yellow card) 27'; SoSo 78' (Robertson)	Stadium: CHI Memorial Stadium; Attendance: 2,388; Referee: Austin Saini

May 13, 2023 7	Lexington SC	1–0	Charlotte Independence	Georgetown, Kentucky
7:00 PM EST	Robertson (yellow card) 57'; Balogun 78'; Fox (red card) 90+4'; Mohammed (yellow card) 90+6'	Report	Dutey (yellow card) 17'; Ibarra (yellow card) 55'; Pack (yellow card) 77'; Spielman (yellow card) 87'; Talboys (yellow card) 87'	Stadium: Toyota Stadium (Kentucky); Attendance: 2.288; Referee: Fevzi Demirhan

May 20, 2023 8	Richmond Kickers	2–1	Lexington SC	Richmond, Virginia
7:00 PM EST	Belmar 60' (Gordon); Gomiero 76' (Mecham) (yellow card) 90+2'; Bentley (yellow card) 87'; Sukow (yellow card) 90+2'; Morán (yellow card) 90+8'	Report	Dlamini (yellow card) 28'; Mané (yellow card) 68'; Smart 90+3' (pen.); Green (yellow card) 90+4'	Stadium: City Stadium (Richmond); Attendance: 5,252; Referee: Adam Brzozowiec

May 27, 2023 9	Lexington SC	1–1	One Knoxville SC	Georgetown, Kentucky
7:00 PM EST	Fox (yellow card) 19'; Brown 43' (Robertson); Dlamini (yellow card) 52'; Machell (yellow card) 54'	Report	van der Pluijim (yellow card) 6'; Keegan 66' (Leinhos)	Stadium: Toyota Stadium (Kentucky); Attendance: 2,282; Referee: Servando Berna Rico

June 3, 2023 10	Lexington SC	2–2	Northern Colorado Hailstorm FC	Georgetown, Kentucky
7:00 PM EST	Diouf 21' (James) 81' (Machell) (yellow card) 82'; Brown (yellow card) 35'; James (yellow card) 45+2'; Green (yellow card) 48'; Balogun (yellow card) 85'	Report	King 4' (Rogers) (yellow card) 45+4'; Lukic (yellow card) 34'; Rendón 39'; Opara (yellow card) 85'	Stadium: Toyota Stadium (Kentucky); Attendance: 2,302; Referee: Donovan Eubank

June 10, 2023 11	Tormenta FC	1–1	Lexington SC	Statesboro, Georgia
7:30 PM EST	Sterling 6' (pen.) (yellow card) 56'; Mocyunas (yellow card) 23'; Akale (yellow card) 59'	Report	Diouf 16' (Murillo); Robertson (yellow card) 31'; Dlamini (yellow card) 36'; Brown (yellow card) 46'; Balogun (yellow card) 82'; Fox (yellow card) 90+1'; SoSo (yellow card) 90+2'; Mané (yellow card) 90+3'	Stadium: Tormenta Stadium; Referee: 1,361
Note: Edgar Garcia

June 14, 2023 12	Lexington SC	2–0	Chattanooga Red Wolves SC	Georgetown, Kentucky
7:00 PM EST	Smart 30' (pen.); Baynham (yellow card) 40'; Machell (yellow card) 57'; Balogun 63' (Robertson); Green (yellow card) 74'; Knight (yellow card) 90+4'	Report	Ualefi (yellow card) 14'; Lombardi (yellow card) 29'; Williams (yellow card) 39'; Nicklaw (yellow card) 65'; Hernández (yellow card) 89'	Stadium: Toyota Stadium (Kentucky); Attendance: 1,986; Referee: Kevin Fikar

June 18, 2023 13	North Carolina FC	2-2	Lexington SC	Cary, North Carolina
3:00 PM EST	Pérez 50' (McLaughlin); McLaughlin 54' (Mentzingen); Navarro (yellow card) 62'	Report	Baynham 31' (Brown); Green (yellow card) 38'; Robertson 81'	Stadium: WakeMed Soccer Park; Attendance: 1,682; Referee: Cristian Campo

June 22, 2023 14	Forward Madison FC	3–2	Lexington SC	Madison, Wisconsin
8:00 PM EST	Bartman 18' (Onen); Crull 35'; Chaney 43'; Cichero (red card) 64'	Report	Green (yellow card) 34'; Brown 38' (Machell) 60' (Balogun); Knight (yellow card) 64'	Stadium: Breese Stevens Field; Attendance: 4,572; Referee: José Carlos Rivero

July 2, 2023 15	Lexington SC	1–5	Tormenta FC	Georgetown, Kentucky
7:00 PM EST	Fox 60' (o.g.); Brown 74' (yellow card) 86'; Diouf (yellow card) 82'	Report	Otieno 4' (Fonseca); Nembhard 27' (Adjei); Dengler (yellow card) 41'; Sterling 48' (Adjei); Cassini 78' (Khoury)	Stadium: Toyota Stadium (Kentucky); Attendance: 2,029; Referee: Michael O'Reilly

July 9, 2023 16	Charlotte Independence	2-1	Lexington SC	Charlotte, North Carolina
7:00 PM EST	Kelly 11' (Ciss); Djedje (yellow card) 35'; Mbuyu 55' (Ibarra); Johnson (yellow card) 71'	Report	Diouf 36' (pen.); Brown (yellow card) 64'	Stadium: American Legion Memorial Stadium; Attendance: 1,376; Referee: Donovan Eubank

July 15, 2023 17	Central Valley Fuego FC	2-1	Lexington SC	Fresno, California
7:00 PM EST	Carrera-García (red card) 35'; Smith (Manager) (yellow card) 41'; Hanson (yellow card) 45+5'; Ekk 48' (Cerritos); Chavez 57' (Vera) (yellow card) 88'; North (yellow card) 84'	Report	Diouf (yellow card) 56' (goal) 62' (Green); Mohammed (yellow card) 80'	Stadium: Fresno State Soccer Stadium; Attendance: 370; Referee: Dion Coxe-Trieger

July 22, 2023 18	Lexington SC	3–0	Union Omaha	Georgetown, Kentucky
7:00 PM EST	Brown 10' (Mohammed); Mohammed (yellow card) 26'; Fox (yellow card) 36'; Diouf 41' (Mohammed); Knight (yellow card) 53'; Machell (yellow card) 70'; Ceja-Gonzalez (yellow card) 75'; Balogun 81' (Robertson)	Report	Willis (yellow card) 38'; Dolabella (yellow card) 78'	Stadium: Toyota Stadium (Kentucky); Attendance: 2,178; Referee: Benjamin Meyer

July 29, 2023 19	Lexington SC	2–2	Richmond Kickers	Georgetown, Kentucky
7:00 PM EST	Smart 10' (pen.) (yellow card) 63'; Machell (yellow card) 16'; Dlamini (yellow card) 45+2'; Diouf (yellow card) 88'	Report	Vinyals 7' 16' (Gomiero) (yellow card) 90+3'; Fitzgerald (yellow card) 9'; Fitch (yellow card) 23' (goal) 68' (o.g.); Morán (yellow card) 26'; Aune (yellow card) 88'	Stadium: Toyota Stadium (Kentucky); Attendance: 2,105; Referee: Drew Klemp

August 2, 2023 20	Union Omaha	2-0	Lexington SC	Papillion, Nebraska
8:00 PM EST	Dos Santos 24' (Doyle); Brito (yellow card) 38'; Scearce 52' (Milanese) (yellow card) 73'	Report	Ceja-Gonzalez (yellow card) 9'; Diouf (yellow card) 36'; Smart (yellow card) 45'; Robertson (yellow card) 90+4'	Stadium: Werner Park; Attendance: 3,524; Referee: Gloria Martinez

August 5, 2023 21	Northern Colorado Hailstorm FC	3-4	Lexington SC	Windsor, Colorado
9:00 PM EST	Amann 28' (Opara) 37' (Hernández) (yellow card) 45+1'; King 46' (Lukic); Rogers (yellow card) 68'; Delgado (yellow card) 71' (red card) 90+8'; Noah Powder (yellow card) 74'	Report	Diouf 4' 65' (Robertson) 90+5' (Machell) (yellow card) 90+6'; Dlamini (yellow card) 34'; Mohammed (yellow card) 35'; Robertson 74' (yellow card) 82'	Stadium: Future Legends Complex; Attendance: 1,716; Referee: Gabriele Ciampi

August 12, 2023 22	Lexington SC	3–2	Central Valley Fuego FC	Georgetown, Kentucky
7:00 PM EST	Robertson 4'; Brown 8' (Robertson); Mané (yellow card) 43'; Smart 59' (pen.)	Report	Arce (yellow card) 30'; Falck 53' (Lemus); Cerritos (yellow card) 85' (goal) 88' (Chavez)	Stadium: Toyota Stadium (Kentucky); Attendance: 2,210; Referee: Joe Surgan

August 18, 2023 23	One Knoxville SC	1-0	Lexington SC	Knoxville, Tennessee
7:30 PM EST	Calixtro (red card) 39'; Kelly-Rosales 49' (Crisler); Castro (yellow card) 60'	Report	Dlamini (yellow card) 35'; Ceja-Gonzalez (yellow card) 57'; Green (yellow card) 59'; SoSo (yellow card) 86'	Stadium: Regal Stadium; Attendance: 2,522; Referee: Cristian Campo

August 26, 2023 24	Lexington SC	1–0	Richmond Kickers	Georgetown, Kentucky
7:55 PM EST	Mohammed (yellow card) 15'; Diouf 83' (pen.); Balogun (yellow card) 89'; SoSo (yellow card) 90+5'	Report	Barnathan (yellow card) 34' (yellow-red card) 81'; O'Dwyer (yellow card) 70'	Stadium: Toyota Stadium (Kentucky); Attendance: 2,145; Referee: Richonne Clark

September 1, 2023 25	Lexington SC	1-1	Greenville Triumph SC	Georgetown, Kentucky
7:00 PM EST	Smart (yellow card) 24'; Robertson 49' (Mohammed); Brown (yellow card) 61'; Balogun (yellow card) 76'; Mohammed (yellow card) 90+9'	Report	Coutinho (yellow card) 6'; Shultz (yellow card) 16'; Smith 90+8' (Pilato)	Stadium: Toyota Stadium (Kentucky); Attendance: 2,142; Referee: Gloria Martinez

September 6, 2023 26	Northern Colorado Hailstorm FC	3-2	Lexington SC	Windsor, Colorado
9:00 PM EST	Hernández 16' (King); Rogers 43'; King (yellow card) 47'; Powder 55' (yellow card) 62'; Robles (yellow card) 59'	Report	Machell (yellow card) 26'; Green (yellow card) 29'; Ceja-Gonzalez (yellow card) 37'; Dlamini 75' (Balogun); Smart 87' (pen.)	Stadium: Future Legends Complex; Attendance: 964; Referee: Mark Verso

September 10, 2023 27	Central Valley Fuego FC	2–2	Lexington SC	Fresno, California
10:30 PM EST	Cerritos 48'; Chavez (yellow card) 67'; Ruelas 90+3'	Report	Diouf 18' (Robertson) (yellow card) 32' (goal) 86' (pen.); Brown (yellow card) 45+3'; Machell (yellow card) 63'; Balogun (yellow card) 85'	Stadium: Fresno State Soccer Stadium; Attendance: 629; Referee: Corbyn May
Note: Sam Stockley's last match before stepping down to be full time Sporting Director

September 17, 2023 28	Lexington SC	2-2	Charlotte Independence	Georgetown, Kentucky
8:55 PM EST	Balogun (yellow card) 32'; Green (yellow card) 47'; Mané 60'	Report	Obertan 33' (Ciss); Johnson 67' (o.g.); Kelly 72'	Stadium: Toyota Stadium (Kentucky); Attendance: 1,911; Referee: Joe Surgan
Note: First match with Nacho Novo as interim head coach

September 23, 2023 29	Lexington SC	3–5	Chattanooga Red Wolves SC	Georgetown, Kentucky
7:00 PM EST	Brown 39' (pen.); Mané (yellow card) 72'; Diouf 77' 90+2'	Report	Lomis 13' (Filipe); Filipe 18' (Hernández); Mensah 41' (Kraft); Williams (yellow card) 46'; Gómez 56' (Kraft); Malango 58' (Filipe)	Stadium: Toyota Stadium (Kentucky); Attendance: 2,047; Referee: Amin Hadzic

September 30, 2023 30	Forward Madison FC	2–2	Lexington SC	Madison, Wisconsin
6:00 PM EST	Martinez (yellow card) 55'; Gebhard 65'; Cichero 78'	Report	Diouf 74'; Jackson 84'	Stadium: Breese Stevens Field; Attendance: 5,000; Referee: Cristian Campo

October 7, 2023 31	Lexington SC	0-1	North Carolina FC	Georgetown, Kentucky
7:00 PM EST	Murillo (yellow card) 48'; Green (yellow card) 48'; Mané (yellow card) 57' (yellow-red card) 63'; Balogun (yellow card) 65'; Diouf (yellow card) 73'; Brown (yellow card) 89'; Mohammed (red card) 90+2'	Report	Anderson 29' (McLaughlin); Blanco (yellow card) 31'; Maldonado (yellow card) 61'; Semmersall (yellow card) 69'; Perez (yellow card) 78'; Benton (red card) 90+2'	Stadium: Toyota Stadium (Kentucky); Attendance: 2,182; Referee: Richonne Clark

October 14, 2023 32	Greenville Triumph SC	1-1	Lexington SC	Greenville, South Carolina
7:00 PM EST	Smith 82' (o.g.) 90+5'	Report	Smart (yellow card) 6'; Robertson (yellow card) 18'	Stadium: Paladin Stadium; Attendance: 3,672; Referee: Joe Surgan

=== U.S. Open Cup ===
As a member of the USL League One, Lexington SC entered their first-ever Open Cup tournament in the 2nd round, with their Cup opener played on April 5, 2023. They opened the competition against USL Championship powerhouse Louisville City FC. The match was the first competitive match against a fellow professional club from the state of Kentucky for both teams. Fans of both sides named the in-state matchup "El Bluegrassico" inspired by soccer derbies from around the world.

April 5 2nd	(Kentucky) Louisville City FC	1–0	Lexington SC (Kentucky)	Louisville, Kentucky
7:00 PM	Totsch 69' (DelPiccolo); DelPiccolo (yellow card) 71'	Report	Dlamini (yellow card) 39'; Mohammed (yellow card) 67'; James (yellow card) 80'; Robertson (yellow card) 90+4'	Stadium: Lynn Family Stadium; Attendance: 4,205; Referee: Nabil Bensalah

== Player statistics ==
=== Goals ===
Place	Pos.	No.	Name	USL1	USOC	Total
1	MF	32	(Senegal) Ates Diouf	15	0	15
2	FW	77	(Jamaica) Nico Brown	8	0	8
3	MF	10	(Jamaica) Don Smart	6	0	6
4	DF	2	(United States) Tate Robertson	4	0	4
4	FW	14	(United States) Khalid Balogun	4	0	4
6	DF	3	(England) Owen Green	1	0	1
6	MF	22	(South Africa) Phila Dlamini	1	0	1
6	MF	25	(Senegal) Pierre Mané	1	0	1
6	FW	9	(Australia) Will Baynham	1	0	1
6	MF	11	(United States) Seo-In Kim "SoSo"	1	0	1
6	DF	4	(United States) Kimball Jackson	1	0	1
Total				43	0	43

=== Assists ===
Place	Pos.	No.	Name	USL1	USOC	Total
1	DF	2	(United States) Tate Robertson	8	0	8
2	MF	8	(England) Charlie Machell	3	0	3
3	DF	57	(Canada) Terique Mohammed	3	0	3
3	FW	14	(United States) Khalid Balogun	2	0	2
3	MF	22	(South Africa) Phila Dlamini	2	0	2
5	DF	3	(England) Owen Green	1	0	1
5	MF	32	(Senegal) Ates Diouf	1	0	1
5	FW	77	(Jamaica) Nico Brown	1	0	1
5	DF	26	(United States) Cesar Murillo	1	0	1
5	FW	7	(United States) Jalen James	1	0	1
Total				23	0	23

=== Clean sheets ===
Place	Pos.	No.	Name	USL1	USOC	Total
1	GK	13	(Jamaica) Amal Knight	4	0	4
2	GK	1	(United States) Austin Causey	1	0	1
Total				5	0	5

=== Disciplinary ===
No.	Pos.	Name	USL		U.S. Open Cup		Total	
No.	Pos.	Name	Booked	Sent off (straight red)	Booked	Sent off (straight red)	Booked	Sent off (straight red)
5	DF	(United States) Kaelon Fox	6	1	0	0	6	1
32	MF	(Senegal) Ates Diouf	9	0	0	0	9	0
8	MF	(England) Charlie Machell	8	0	0	0	8	0
13	GK	(Jamaica) Amal Knight	3	0	0	0	3	0
2	DF	(United States) Tate Robertson	6	0	1	0	7	0
9	ST	(Australia) Will Baynham	1	0	0	0	1	0
3	FW	(England) Owen Green	10	0	0	0	10	0
25	MF	(Senegal) Pierre Mané	4	1	0	0	4	1
4	DF	(United States) Kimball Jackson	0	0	0	0	0	0
14	FW	(United States) Khalid Balogun	11	0	0	0	11	0
20	DF	(Tanzania) Diallo Irakoze	0	0	0	0	0	0
22	MF	(South Africa) Phila Dlamini	6	0	1	0	7	0
77	FW	(Jamaica) Nico Brown	8	0	0	0	8	0
11	MF	(South Korea) Seo-In Kim "SoSo"	3	0	0	0	3	0
18	FW	(United States) Drew Patterson	0	0	0	0	0	0
7	FW	(United States) Jalen James	1	0	1	0	2	0
17	DF	(United States) Erick Ceja-Gonzalez	4	0	0	0	4	0
1	GK	(United States) Austin Causey	0	0	0	0	0	0
10	MF	(Jamaica) Don Smart	4	1	0	0	4	1
57	DF	(Canada) Terique Mohammed	8	1	1	0	9	1
26	DF	(United States) Cesar Murillo	1	1	0	0	1	1
33	DF	(United States) Franky Martinez	1	0	0	0	1	0
44	GK	(United States) Luke Phillips	0	0	0	0	0	0
80	FW	(United States) Josh Head	0	0	0	0	0	0
Total			95	5	4	0	100	5
