= Yesin van der Pluijm =

Dutch footballer

Personal information
- Date of birth: 4 April 1999 (age 27)
- Place of birth: Spijkenisse, Netherlands
- Height: 1.82 m (6 ft 0 in)
- Positions: Defender; midfielder

Youth career
- 2006–2015: Feyenoord
- 2016–2018: Excelsior

College career
Years	Team	Apps	(Gls)
2018–2021	Young Harris Mountain Lions	54	(4)

Senior career*
Years	Team	Apps	(Gls)
2019	Cincinnati Dutch Lions	11	(1)
2020	East Atlanta	13	(4)
2022	Colorado Springs Switchbacks	1	(0)
2023–2024	One Knoxville	38	(1)
- * Club domestic league appearances and goals as of 22 November 2024

Yesin van der Pluijm (born 4 April 1999) is a Dutch professional footballer who plays as a midfielder.

== Career ==
=== Youth ===
Van der Pluijm, raised in Rotterdam, joined local side Feyenoord when he was seven year's old. After almost a decade with the club, he left the club and joined Excelsior, where he captained the U19 side in his first season.

=== College and amateur ===
In 2018, Van der Pluijm moved to the United States to play college soccer at Young Harris College. Over three seasons with the Mountain Lions, he made 54 appearances, scoring four goals and tallying three assists. In 2019 he was named to the United Soccer Coaches NCAA Division II All-Southeast Region second team, CoSIDA Academic All-District III Men's Soccer Team, the All-Peach Belt Conference second team, and the Peach Belt Conference Men's Soccer Team of Academic Distinction.

In 2019, Van der Pluijm played in the USL League Two with Cincinnati Dutch Lions, where he scored a single goal in 11 appearances.

=== Professional ===
On 17 December 2021, it was announced that Van der Pluijm would join USL Championship side Colorado Springs Switchbacks ahead of their 2022 season. He made his professional debut on 26 March 2022, appearing as a 90th–minute substitute in a 2–0 win over Birmingham Legion.

Van der Pluijm joined USL League One expansion club One Knoxville SC on 15 December 2022. The move reunites van der Pluijm and his college coach, Mark McKeever. He made his USL League One debut on 19 March 2023 starting against Lexington SC and scoring his first goal on 1 May 2023, a game winning overtime goal against Central Valley Fuego FC. He was released by Knoxville following their 2024 season.
