= 2019 NAIA Division I men's basketball tournament =

- Teams: 32
- Finals site: Municipal Auditorium; Kansas City, Missouri
- Champions: Georgetown (Ky.) (3 title, 7 title game, 13 Fab Four)
- Runner-up: Carroll (Mont.) (1 title game, 1 Fab Four)
- Semifinalists: William Carey (Miss.) (1 Final Four); Lewis-Clark State (Idaho) (1 Final Four)

The 2019 NAIA Division I men's basketball tournament was held March 22–26 at Municipal Auditorium in Kansas City, Missouri. The 82nd annual NAIA basketball tournament features 32 teams playing in a single-elimination format. The opening game round started on March 20, and the National Championship Game was played on March 26.

== 2019 NAIA results ==
Georgetown won its 3rd national championship in school history. They are the school with the most overall appearances in the tournament and 28th consecutive tournament. They are now 3-4 in the National Championship Game. They previously won in 1998 and 2013.

== 2019 NAIA bracket ==
First round March 20–21	Second round March 22
1	Georgetown (Ky.)	77
8	Rocky Mountain (Mont.)	57
1	Georgetown	82
5	LSU Shreveport	79
4	William Jessup (Calif.)	65
5	LSU Shreveport (La.)	83
NAISMITH BRACKET; March 20
3	Missouri Baptist	67
6	Loyola (La.)	68
6	Loyola	77
7	Arizona Christian	83
2	Wayland Baptist (Texas)	73
7	Arizona Christian	81
1	Tougaloo (Miss.)	64
8	Mid-America Christian (Okla.)	73
8	Mid-America Christian	60
4	William Carey	62
4	William Carey (Miss.)	95
5	Peru State (Neb.)	89
CRAMER BRACKET; March 21
3	Wiley (Texas)	68
6	Cumberland (Ky)	56
3	Wiley	63
7	USAO	76
2	The Master's (Calif.)	75
7	Science and Arts (Okla.)	78
1	Benedictine (Kan.)	90
8	Westmont (Calif.)	85
1	Benedictine	79
4	Pikeville	83**
4	Pikeville (Ky.)	69
5	Talladega	65
DUER BRACKET; March 21
3	Carroll (Mont.)	71
6	St. Thomas (Texas)	65
3	Carroll	80
7	Oklahoma City	69
2	Stillman (Ala.)	84
7	Oklahoma City	101
1	LSU Alexandria (La.)	81
8	Central Baptist (Ark.)	74
1	LSU Alexandria	78
5	Bethel	73
4	John Brown (Ark.)	57
5	Bethel (Tenn.)	77
LISTON BRACKET; March 20
3	Vanguard (Calif.)	53
6	William Penn (Iowa)	69
6	William Penn	86
2	Lewis-Clark State	88
2	Lewis-Clark State (Idaho)	71
7	Campbellsville (Ky.)	70

Quarterfinals; March 23
1	Georgetown	80
7	Arizona Christian	78
4	William Carey	102*
7	USAO	98
4	Pikeville	56
3	Carroll	72
1	LSU-Alexandria	74
2	Lewis-Clark State	80

National Semifinals; March 25
1	Georgetown	94
4	William Carey	83
3	Carroll	66
2	Lewis-Clark State	55

National Championship; March 26
1	Georgetown	68
3	Carroll	48
