= Yannick Yankam =

Maltese footballer

Personal information
- Full name: Yannick Yankam
- Date of birth: 12 December 1997 (age 28)
- Place of birth: Qormi, Malta
- Height: 1.83 m (6 ft 0 in)
- Position: Midfielder

Team information
- Current team: Valletta
- Number: 20

Youth career
- –2015: Qormi

Senior career*
Years	Team	Apps	(Gls)
2015–2019	Qormi	89	(9)
2019–2023	Birkirkara	90	(10)
2024–2025	Lexington SC	17	(2)
2025–	Valletta	32	(4)

International career^{‡}
2023–	Malta	17	(1)
- * Club domestic league appearances and goals as of 7 May 2026 ‡ National team caps and goals as of 19:45, 18 November 2026 (UTC)

Yannick Yankam (born 12 December 1997) is a Maltese professional footballer and rapper who plays as a midfielder for Valletta and the Malta national team.

== Club career ==
Yankam started his career with Qormi, where he played for as a youth player. In 2019, he joined Birkirkara. He made his senior team debut on 23 August 2019 in a 1–0 league loss against Floriana. He scored his first goal on 22 February 2020 in a 2–1 league win against Hibernians. While playing football, he has received racist abuse during games. In 2023, after scoring his first international goal, Yankam was regarded as a prospect in Maltese football.

On 8 January 2024, Yankam joined American club Lexington SC in the USL League One on a permanent deal, signing a two-year contract.

In June 2015, Yankam joined Valletta F.C..

== International career ==
Yankam made his senior team debut on 23 March 2023, scoring in a 2–1 UEFA European Championship qualifying defeat against North Macedonia.

== Style of play ==
Yankam mainly operates as a midfielder.

== Music career ==
Yankam is also a rapper who goes by the name Yannick. He was a part of the Maltese rap collective 215collective, together with rappers Caro and Eddie Fresco. In 2019, he released his debut EP. He was nominated for the 2020 Bay Music Awards Best Hip Hop/ RnB Artist.

== Personal life ==
Yankam was born in Malta to a Cameroonian father and a Maltese mother.

== Career statistics ==
=== Club ===
As of 26 March 2023

Appearances and goals by club and year
Club	Year	Apps	Goals
Qormi	2015–16	22	0
Qormi	2016–17	20	2
Qormi	2017–18	25	3
Qormi	2018–19	27	4
Birkirkara	2019–20	14	1
Birkirkara	2020–21	24	4
Birkirkara	2021–22	26	2
Birkirkara	2022–23	24	6
Total		182	22

=== International ===
As of 1 December 2023

Appearances and goals by national team and year
National team	Year	Apps	Goals
Malta	2023	10	1
Total		10	1

=== International goals ===
#	Date	Venue	Opponent	Score	Result	Competition
1.	23 March 2023	Toše Proeski Arena, Skopje, North Macedonia	North Macedonia	1–2	1–2	UEFA Euro 2024 qualifying

== Honours ==
=== Club ===
Birkirkara

- Maltese FA Trophy: 2022–23
