= Modesto Méndez =

Cuban footballer (born 1998)

Personal information
- Full name: Modesto Méndez Amador
- Date of birth: 6 January 1998 (age 28)
- Place of birth: Pinar del Río, Cuba
- Height: 1.88 m (6 ft 2 in)
- Position: Defender

Senior career*
Years	Team	Apps	(Gls)
2015–2020	Pinar del Río		
2020–2023	Inter Miami CF II	45	(2)
2021	→ Charleston Battery (loan)	1	(0)
2022	Inter Miami CF	0	(0)
2023	Hartford Athletic	5	(0)
2024	Lexington SC	19	(0)

International career
2021–	Cuba	13	(0)
- * Club domestic league appearances and goals as of November 21, 2024

Modesto Méndez Amador (born 6 January 1998) is a Cuban footballer who plays as a defender for the Cuba national team.

== Career ==
=== Inter Miami CF II ===
After joining the club in early 2020, Méndez made his debut for the club on 18 July 2020, tallying 63 minutes before being replaced by Ian Fray in a 2–0 defeat to Greenville Triumph.

On 12 July 2021, Méndez joined USL Championship side Charleston Battery on a short-term loan deal.

On 1 August 2023, Méndez moved to USL Championship side Hartford Athletic.

Méndez signed for USL League One club Lexington SC on 15 December 2023. He was released by Lexington following their 2024 season.

== International career ==
Méndez debuted for the Cuba national team in a 1–0 2022 FIFA World Cup qualification win over Saint Vincent and the Grenadines on 8 June 2021.
