= Charlie Machell =

English footballer (born 1994)

Personal information
- Full name: Charles William Hew Machell
- Date of birth: 25 October 1994 (age 32)
- Place of birth: Newcastle, England
- Height: 6 ft 2 in (1.88 m)
- Positions: Midfielder; centre-back

Youth career
- 2002–2011: Newcastle United
- 2011–2012: Darlington

College career
| Years | Team | Apps | (Gls) |
| 2013–2015 | Wingate Bulldogs | 59 | (25) |
| 2016 | ETSU Buccaneers | 18 | |

Senior career*
| Years | Team | Apps | (Gls) |
| 2017–2018 | Thisted FC | 19 | (0) |
| 2018 | 07 Vestur | 9 | (1) |
| 2019 | Svay Rieng | 23 | (6) |
| 2020 | Hougang United | 8 | (2) |
| 2021 | Visakha | 0 | (0) |
| 2021 | Perak | 7 | (0) |
| 2022 | Al-Ittihad Club | | |
| 2022 | FC Tucson | 22 | (1) |
| 2023 | Lexington SC | 32 | (0) |
| 2024 | One Knoxville | 5 | (0) |
| 2024 | → Palm City (loan) | 6 | (0) |
| 2025 | Precision Football | 8 | (2) |
- * Club domestic league appearances and goals as of 08:12, 2 May 2025 (UTC)

Charles William Hew Machell (born 25 October 1994) is an English professional footballer who plays as a midfielder or centre-back.

== Early life ==
Machell was born in Newcastle upon Tyne, his father Christopher Machell, a Policeman and his mother Sally Morrison (Nicholson) a nurse.

His brother is actor and writer Tom Machell.

== Youth career ==
Machell started his career with his hometown team Newcastle United, featuring for Newcastle's academy and played alongside Watford's Will Hughes as an England youth international. The Newcastle born midfielder was in the Magpies' youth academy until he was released aged sixteen. He then spent a brief spell in fellow North East club Darlington's academy before making the decision to move to America to study and continue his football education.

In 2013, Machell moved to the US, playing for Wingate University and appeared in all 17 matches during his first year at Wingate, starting 10 contests and registered five goals and two assists. The following year saw him winning the 2014 South Atlantic Conference player of the year award and was part of an NSCAA third-team All-American selection. He started all 20 matches as a sophomore, collecting 12 goals and four assist and led the SAC in goals and points.

Machell then spent one season with the East Tennessee State University after transferring from Wingate Bulldogs and helped propel ETSU to its first at-large appearance in the NCAA tournament in 2016, starting in 18 matches for ETSU and finished the 2016 season with three assists.

== Career ==
=== Thisted FC ===
After completing his studies, Machell attended trials with US clubs as well as a combine in New York with several Danish agents and coaches in attendance. He was then approached by an agent and also the head coach of Thisted FC who invited him on a pre-season trial with the club. Machell then signed his first professional contract after he penned a one-year contract with Thisted FC of the Danish 1st Division. In total, he made 19 appearances in the Danish second tier for Thisted FC in his one and only season with them.

=== 07 Vestur ===
Machell then moved on to top flight Faroe Islands side 07 Vestur.

=== Svay Rieng ===
Machell then signed for Cambodian side Svay Rieng FC for the 2019 C-League season. He helped the team to an unbeatable tally of 65 points from 25 games, sealing up the title for the provincial side.

=== Hougang United ===
Machell signed for Singaporean side Hougang United FC for the 2020 Singapore Premier League season, where the club will also be participating in the 2020 AFC Cup.

Machell made his competitive debut and scored his first goal for the Cheetahs in Hougang's AFC Cup debut, smashing in an unstoppable half-volley into the back of the net and helping his new club to a 3–1 win over Lao Toyota in Vientiane.

In February 2021, Machell returned to Cambodia to join Visakha.

=== Perak ===
On 17 June 2021, it was announced that Machell had joined Malaysia Super League side Perak.

=== Al-Ittihad ===
In January 2022, Machell joined Oman Professional League side Al-Ittihad Club.

=== FC Tucson ===
In March 2022, Machell returned to the US to join USL League One side FC Tucson.

=== Lexington SC ===
In January 2023, Machell joined newly-formed USL League One side Lexington.

=== One Knoxville ===
Machell signed with One Knoxville of USL League One on 25 January 2024.

=== Al Qabila ===
On 23 September 2024, Machell was sent on loan to Al Qabila of the UAE Third Division League. In February 2025, Machell was playing for UAE Second Division League side Precision Football.

== Career statistics ==
As of 10 March 2020

Appearances and goals by club, season and competition
| Club | Season | League | | | National cup (Note: Includes Singapore Cup.) | | League cup (Note: Includes Singapore Community Shield.) | | Continental | | Total | |
| Club | Season | Division | Apps | Goals | Apps | Goals | Apps | Goals | Apps | Goals | Apps | Goals |
|---|---|---|---|---|---|---|---|---|---|---|---|---|
| Thisted FC | 2017–18 | Danish 1st Division | 19 | 0 | 0 | 0 | 0 | 0 | 0 | 0 | 19 | 0 |
| 07 Vestur | 2018 | Faroe Islands Premier League | 9 | 1 | 0 | 0 | 0 | 0 | 0 | 0 | 9 | 1 |
| Svay Rieng FC | 2019 | Cambodian Premier League | 0 | 0 | 0 | 0 | 0 | 0 | 0 | 0 | 0 | 0 |
| Hougang United | 2020 | Singapore Premier League | 8 | 2 | 0 | 0 | 1 | 0 | 2 | 1 | 11 | 3 |
| Visakha FC | 2021 | Cambodian Premier League | 0 | 0 | 0 | 0 | 0 | 0 | 0 | 0 | 0 | 0 |
| Career total | | | 0 | 0 | 0 | 0 | 0 | 0 | 0 | 0 | 0 | 0 |

== Honours ==
Svay Rieng

- Cambodian League: 2019

Individual

- South Atlantic Conference Player of the Year: 2014
