= Khalid Balogun =

American soccer player (born 1998)

Personal information
- Full name: Khalid Olamipo Morolayo Balogun
- Date of birth: 25 July 1998 (age 28)
- Place of birth: Washington, D.C., United States
- Height: 6 ft 4 in (1.93 m)
- Position: Forward

Team information
- Current team: Carolina Core FC
- Number: 14

Youth career
- D.C. United
- Montgomery Soccer Club

College career
Years	Team	Apps	(Gls)
2016–2019	St. Mary's Seahawks	66	(37)

Senior career*
Years	Team	Apps	(Gls)
2019	FC Baltimore Christos	5	(1)
2021–2022	Maryland Bobcats	23	(3)
2023–2024	Lexington SC	37	(5)
2024	→ Miami FC (loan)	3	(1)
2025	District Elite		
2026–	Carolina Core FC	0	(0)
- * Club domestic league appearances and goals as of June 24, 2025

Khalid Olamipo Morolayo Balogun (born July 25, 1998) is an American soccer player who plays as a forward for MLS Next Pro club Carolina Core FC.

== Career ==
=== Youth, College & Amateur ===
Balogun was born in Washington D.C., grew up in Bowie, Maryland, and attended Bowie High School. He also played club soccer with the D.C. United academy and with Montgomery Soccer Club.

In 2016, Balogun attended St. Mary's College of Maryland to play college soccer. In four seasons with the Seahawks, Balogun went on to make 66 appearances, scoring 37 goals and tallying 19 assists, also earning two United Soccer Coaches All-American honors and four All-Region awards. Balogun was also the Capital Athletic Conference Offensive Player of the Year in 2019 and Rookie of the Year in 2016.

Balogun competed with National Premier Soccer League side FC Baltimore Christos during their 2019 season, scoring one goal in five regular season games.

=== Professional ===
In May 2021, Balogun signed his first professional contract with National Independent Soccer Association's Maryland Bobcats. In two seasons with the Bobcats, Balogun scored three goals in 24 appearances over all competitions.

On January 17, 2023, Balogun made the move to USL League One side Lexington SC ahead of their inaugural season. In the club's first-ever game, Balogun earned Lexington a penalty during a 2–1 loss away to One Knoxville.

On June 29, 2024, Balogun joined USL Championship side Miami FC on loan for the remainder of their season.

He was released by Lexington following their 2024 season.

Balogun joined District Elite FC of the National Premier Soccer League in February 2025.
