= Abel Caputo =

Venezuelan footballer (born 2000)

Personal information
- Full name: Abel Alejandro Caputo
- Date of birth: 11 July 2000 (age 26)
- Place of birth: Caracas, Venezuela
- Height: 1.78 m (5 ft 10 in)
- Position: Midfielder

Team information
- Current team: One Knoxville
- Number: 6

Youth career
- 2018–2019: Levante
- 2019–2020: Roeselare

Senior career*
Years	Team	Apps	(Gls)
2019–2020	Roeselare	1	(0)
2020	Florida Soccer Soldiers		
2021–2023	Inter Miami II	62	(1)
2023	Tampa Bay Rowdies	2	(0)
2024	Lexington SC	21	(0)
2025–	One Knoxville	57	(1)
- * Club domestic league appearances and goals as of October 31, 2026

Abel Alejandro Caputo (born 11 July 2000) is a Venezuelan footballer who plays as a midfielder for USL League One side One Knoxville SC.

== Career ==
=== Inter Miami II ===
Caputo was signed to Inter Miami II in 2021.

=== Tampa Bay Rowdies ===
On July 28, 2023, Caputo signed with the Tampa Bay Rowdies for the remainder of the 2023 USL Championship season. Caputo was released by the Rowdies at the end of the 2023 season.

=== One Knoxville SC ===
Caputo joined USL League One club One Knoxville SC on February 4, 2024.

== Career statistics ==
=== Club ===
As of 20 October 2019.

Club	Season	League			Cup		Continental		Other		Total	
Club	Season	Division	Apps	Goals	Apps	Goals	Apps	Goals	Apps	Goals	Apps	Goals
K.S.V. Roeselare	2019–20	Proximus League	1	0	0	0	–		0	0	1	0
Career total			1	0	0	0	0	0	0	0	1	0
