= Kingsford Adjei =

Ghanaian footballer

Personal information
- Date of birth: 21 January 1999 (age 27)
- Place of birth: Accra, Ghana
- Height: 5 ft 5 in (1.65 m)
- Position: Winger

Youth career
- 2011–2016: Right to Dream Academy

College career
Years	Team	Apps	(Gls)
2018	Quincy Hawks	18	(9)
2019–2021	Dayton Flyers	36	(21)

Senior career*
Years	Team	Apps	(Gls)
2017–2018	Westfields		
2019	Asheville City SC	1	(0)
2019	Dayton Dutch Lions	12	(3)
2021	Des Moines Menace	6	(5)
2022–2023	South Georgia Tormenta	59	(10)
2024	One Knoxville	15	(0)
- * Club domestic league appearances and goals as of 22 November 2024

Kingsford Adjei (born 21 January 1999) is a Ghanaian professional footballer who plays as a winger.

== Career ==
=== Youth ===
Adjei played with the Right to Dream Academy in Ghana for five years, where he was named the Academy Student of the Year.

=== College & amateur ===
In 2016, Adjei moved to the United Kingdom to attend Hartpury College and played non-league football with Westfields while studying.

In 2018, Adjei moved to the United States to play college soccer at Quincy University. In his freshman season, he scored nine goals and tallied two assists for the Hawks in 18 appearances. Adjei transferred to the University of Dayton in 2019, going on to make 36 appearances with the Flyers, scoring 21 goals and adding 12 assists to his name. He was named Midfielder of the Year twice for the Atlantic 10 Conference and made the A-10 First Team in three consecutive seasons.

In 2019, Adjei played with National Premier Soccer League club Asheville City SC, making a single appearance. and also with USL League Two side Dayton Dutch Lions later in the summer. During the 2021 season, Adjei appeared for USL League Two side Des Moines Menace, scoring five goals in six games, helping the team to win the USL League Two Championship.

=== Professional ===
On 11 January 2022, Adjei was selected 56th-overall in the 2022 MLS SuperDraft by New York City FC. On 18 February 2022, Adjei signed his first professional deal, joining USL League One club South Georgia Tormenta ahead of their 2022 season. He made his professional debut on 2 April 2022, starting in a 1–0 loss to North Carolina FC. On 22 December 2023, Adjei made the move to One Knoxville ahead of their 2024 season in the USL League One. He was released by Knoxville following their 2024 season.

== Honors ==
Des Moines Menace

- USL League Two: 2021
