= Amal Knight =

Jamaican footballer (born 1993)

Personal information
- Full name: Amal Knight
- Date of birth: 19 November 1993 (age 32)
- Place of birth: Jamaica
- Height: 1.91 m (6 ft 3 in)
- Position: Goalkeeper

Team information
- Current team: Greenville Triumph
- Number: 13

Senior career*
Years	Team	Apps	(Gls)
2012–2013	Harbour View	0	(0)
2013–2019	UWI	94	(0)
2020	San Diego Loyal	0	(0)
2020	→ FC Tucson (loan)	7	(0)
2021	Arnett Gardens	4	(0)
2022	Harbour View	19	(0)
2023–2024	Lexington SC	45	(0)
2025	Chitwan	6	(0)
2025	Charlotte Independence	6	(0)
2026–	Greenville Triumph	22	(0)

International career^{‡}
2018–	Jamaica	9	(0)
- * Club domestic league appearances and goals as of 13:07, 1 November 2025 (UTC) ‡ National team caps and goals as of 07:53, 10 April 2021 (UTC)

Amal Knight (born 19 November 1993) is a Jamaican professional footballer who plays as a goalkeeper for USL League One club Greenville Triumph SC and the Jamaica national team.

== Early life and education ==
Knight attended Wolmer's Boys High School before earning a scholarship to the University of the West Indies.

== Club career ==
He played club football for Harbour View and UWI. In 2020, Knight signed with new USL Championship club San Diego Loyal. In June 2020 he moved on loan to FC Tucson.

In July 2021, Knight signed with Arnett Gardens in Jamaica.

On 11 January, Knight signed with Lexington SC of USL League One. He was released by Lexington following their 2024 season.

After spending early 2025 with F.C. Chitwan in the Nepal Super League, Knight joined Charlotte Independence on 8 August 2025.

He signed with Greenville Triumph SC in January 2026.

== International career ==
He made his international debut for Jamaica in 2018.
