= Ates Diouf =

Senegalese footballer (born 2000)

Personal information
- Full name: Alasanne Ates Diouf
- Date of birth: 24 March 2000 (age 26)
- Place of birth: Dakar, Senegal
- Height: 6 ft 2 in (1.88 m)
- Position: Winger

Team information
- Current team: Detroit City (on loan from Lexington)
- Number: 32

Youth career
- 2017–2019: Orlando City

Senior career*
Years	Team	Apps	(Gls)
2018	SIMA Águilas	5	(0)
2019	Orlando City B	17	(1)
2020–2021	Austin Bold	38	(5)
2022	San Antonio FC	11	(0)
2023–	Lexington SC	50	(22)
2025–	→ Detroit City (loan)	49	(8)
- * Club domestic league appearances and goals as of November 4, 2026

Alasanne Ates Diouf (born 24 March 2000) is a Senegalese professional footballer who plays for Detroit City in the USL Championship, on loan from Lexington.

== Career ==
=== SIMA ===
Diouf was spotted by SIMA Águilas head coach Mike Potempa in Dakar while playing as part of former Senegal international midfielder Salif Diao's Sport4Charity foundation and invited to move to America and enroll at the academy.

=== Orlando City B ===
In 2019, Diouf was signed to Orlando City B ahead of their inaugural USL League One season. On 30 March 2019, Diouf made his debut for Orlando City B in a 3–1 loss against FC Tucson. Diouf played the entire match. He scored his first goal for the team on 14 April 2019, in a 1–1 draw against South Georgia Tormenta.

=== Austin Bold ===
On 21 April 2020, Diouf signed for USL Championship team Austin Bold having spent preseason on trial with the club although USL had already temporarily suspended play due to the COVID-19 pandemic in March. He scored his first goal for the club on 8 August 2020, in the 38' of a 4–1 home victory against RGV Toros.

=== San Antonio FC ===
On 19 January 2022, Diouf joined San Antonio FC.

=== Lexington SC ===
On 10 January 2023, Diouf was announced as the second professional signing by USL League One expansion side Lexington SC.

=== Detroit City ===
On 20 February 2025, Diouf was announced by the USL Championship team Detroit City for a season-long loan from Lexington SC.
