= Pierre Mané =

Senegalese footballer

Personal information
- Full name: Pierre Fiorre Mané
- Date of birth: 16 June 1998 (age 28)
- Place of birth: Dakar, Senegal
- Height: 5 ft 9 in (1.75 m)
- Position: Midfielder

Youth career
- –2017: Montverde Academy

College career
| Years | Team | Apps | (Gls) |
| 2017–2018 | Pittsburgh Panthers | 10 | (1) |
| 2019–2021 | VCU Rams | 45 | (3) |

Senior career*
| Years | Team | Apps | (Gls) |
| 2021 | FC Florida U23 | 6 | (1) |
| 2023–2024 | Lexington SC | 47 | (1) |
- * Club domestic league appearances and goals as of 31 October 2024

Pierre Fiorre Mané (born 16 June 1998) is a Senegalese professional footballer who plays as a midfielder.

== Career ==
=== Youth career ===
Mané was born in Dakar but moved to the United States to attend the Montverde Academy in Florida. After graduating, Mané attended the University of Pittsburgh to play college soccer. He missed the entire 2017 season due to injury, but went on to make ten appearances for the Panthers in 2018. Mané scored a single goal on the way to helping the side to their first-ever ACC tournament match win. in 2019, Mané transferred to Virginia Commonwealth University, where he made 45 appearances, scoring three goals and tallying two assists. During his final year of college, Mané also played in the USL League Two with FC Florida U23, making six appearances.

=== Professional career ===
On 16 January 2023, Mané signed his first professional contract with USL League One side Lexington SC ahead of their inaugural season. He was released by Lexington following their 2024 season.
