= Jalen James =

American soccer player (born 2000)

Personal information
- Full name: Jalen James
- Date of birth: May 10, 2000 (age 26)
- Place of birth: Grand Prairie, Texas, United States
- Height: 5 ft 10 in (1.78 m)
- Position: Winger

Youth career
- 2014–2018: FC Dallas

College career
| Years | Team | Apps | (Gls) |
| 2018–2022 | Campbell Fighting Camels | 60 | (20) |

Senior career*
| Years | Team | Apps | (Gls) |
| 2019 | Denton Diablos | 8 | (4) |
| 2021 | Mississippi Brilla | 11 | (5) |
| 2022 | South Georgia Tormenta 2 | 11 | (1) |
| 2023 | Lexington SC | 19 | (0) |
| 2024–2025 | Chattanooga FC | 22 | (5) |
- * Club domestic league appearances and goals as of January 25, 2025

Jalen James (born May 10, 2000) is an American professional soccer player who plays as a winger.

== Career ==
=== Youth, College & Amateur ===
James attended Lone Star High School. While at high school he earned attended multiple US Youth Soccer Association Olympic Development Program camps and won a pair of USYSA State Cup championships. He joined the FC Dallas academy in 2014, where he played until 2018.

In 2018, James attended Campbell University in 2018, where after redshirting his freshman season he went on to make 60 appearances for the Fighting Camels, scoring 20 goals and tallying eight assists. During his college career, James garnered all-region honors from United Soccer Coaches and all-conference honors from the Big South.

During his summers in college, James played at the semi-professional level. In 2019, he made eight appearances for National Premier Soccer League side Denton Diablos, scoring four goals. 2021 saw him play in the USL League Two with Mississippi Brilla, scoring five goals in 11 games and been named to the 2021 League Two Top Prospects list and the Central Conference Team of the Year. In 2022, James remained in the USL League Two with Tormenta FC 2, scoring a single goal for the team in 11 appearances.

=== Professional ===
On January 24, 2023, James signed his first professional contract with USL League One side Lexington SC ahead of their inaugural season.
