= One Knoxville SC =

American soccer club

One Knoxville
- Full name: One Knoxville Sporting Club
- Nickname: The Scruffy Boys
- Founded: 2021; 5 years ago
- Stadium: Covenant Health Park; Knoxville, Tennessee
- Capacity: 6,355
- Owner: Drew McKenna
- Head Coach: Ian Fuller
- League: USL League One
- 2025: USL League One, 1st of 14; Playoffs: Champions
- Website: oneknoxsc.com
Home colors	Away colors

One Knoxville Sporting Club is an American soccer team based in Knoxville, Tennessee, that competes in USL League One, the third tier of the United States soccer league system. The team plays their home matches at Covenant Health Park, a multi-use stadium designed for soccer and baseball, alongside the Knoxville Smokies, a minor league baseball team for the Chicago Cubs.

== History ==
=== USL League Two ===
The club was initially unveiled as Knox Pro Soccer starting as a semi-professional USL League Two club with the goal to eventually move to the professional USL League One in the future. The official name for the team, One Knoxville Sporting Club, was announced on July 15, 2021. The official crest for the team, designed by artist Matthew Wolff, was unveiled on August 19, 2021. Mark McKeever was appointed as the club's first ever head coach on January 13, 2021.

The team made their USL2 debut on May 14, 2022 hosting Asheville City SC, where they were defeated by a score of 2–1 in front of 2200 spectators. They recorded their first victory in their next match on May 17, defeating the Tri-Cities Otters by a score of 1–0. In their inaugural season, they won the South Central Division, with an 11–1–2 record, advancing to the playoffs. After winning their first two playoff rounds, the club was defeated by North Carolina Fusion U23 in the South Conference Finals (league quarterfinals).

=== USL League One ===
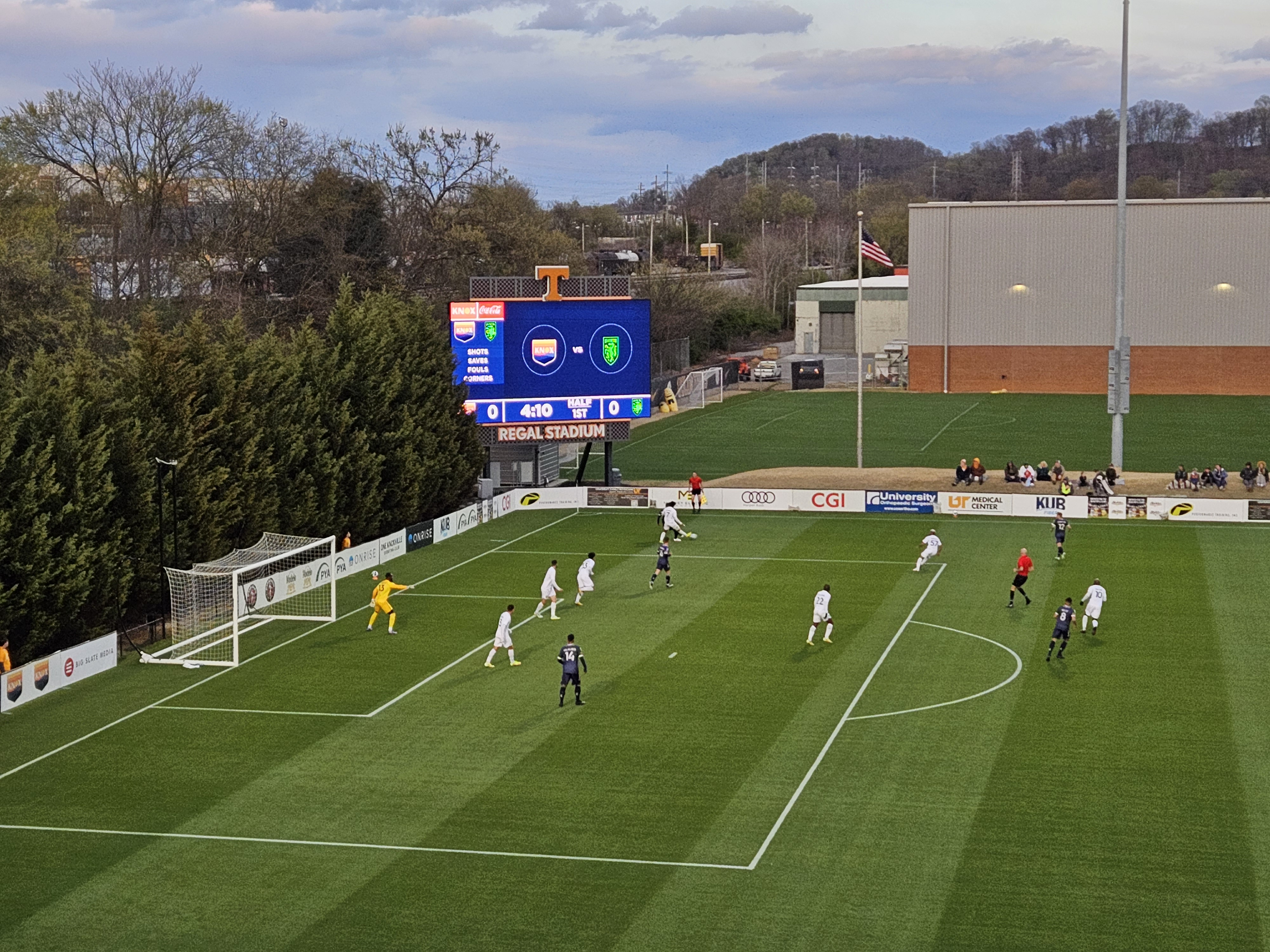
One Knoxville SC and Lexington SC competing at Regal Stadium in Knoxville

On October 20, 2022, it was announced that the club would move up to the fully professional level, joining USL League One. The club also announced that all of the team's 15 home games would by played at Regal Stadium, home of the Tennessee Lady Volunteers.

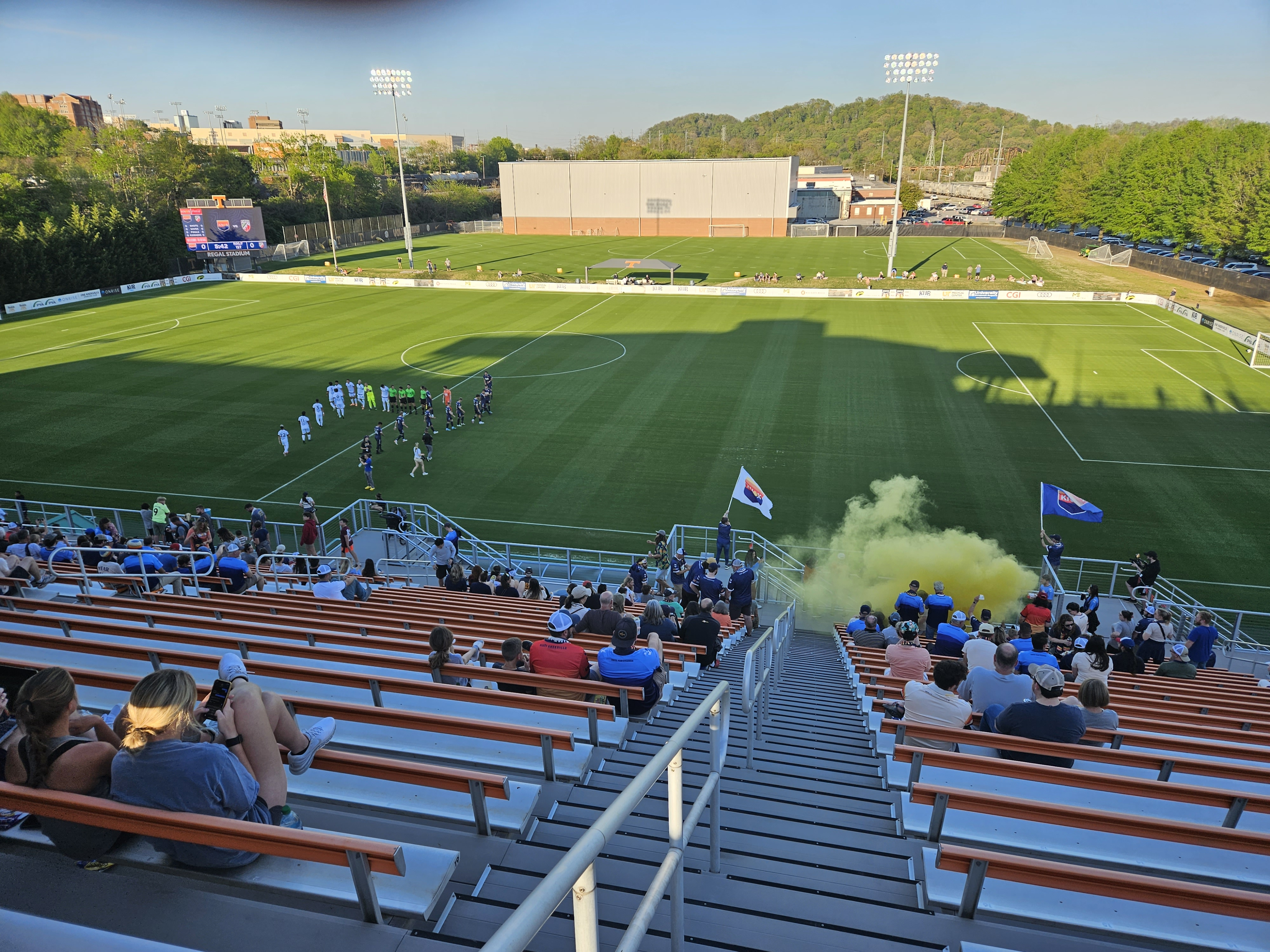
One Knoxville SC home game versus Central Valley Fuego FC, 2023

The club announced their first professional signing on December 12, 2022, forward Ilija Ilić, who will also serve as assistant coach.

The club scored its first ever professional win with a 2–1 victory over Lexington SC. Midfielder Jimmie Villalobos scored the team's first ever professional goal.

On April 26, 2025, One Knoxville SC set the record for largest home attendance for a USL1 club across all competitions with 6,378 fans in attendance for a match against FC Tulsa in the opening round of the USL Cup.

On October 25, 2025, One Knoxville SC won its first-ever USL1 regular-season championship, receiving the USL1 Players’ Shield.

On November 16, 2025, One Knoxville SC won their first-ever USL1 league title, marking the club's first major trophy. They defeated Spokane Velocity FC 2–0 in front of a record 7,500 fans at Covenant Health Park.

On April 15, 2026, in the round of 32 of the 2026 U.S. Open Cup, One Knoxville SC upset D.C. United, a team in the MLS, the highest tier of American professional soccer. This marks the 3rd time in history a USL1 team has beaten an MLS team.

=== Women's team ===
On March 8, 2025, the club announced the addition of a women's team, which would complete in its inaugural season in the USL W-League beginning that year. Simon Duffy, the women's soccer coach at Carson-Newman University, was hired to lead the new women's soccer team.

== Stadium ==
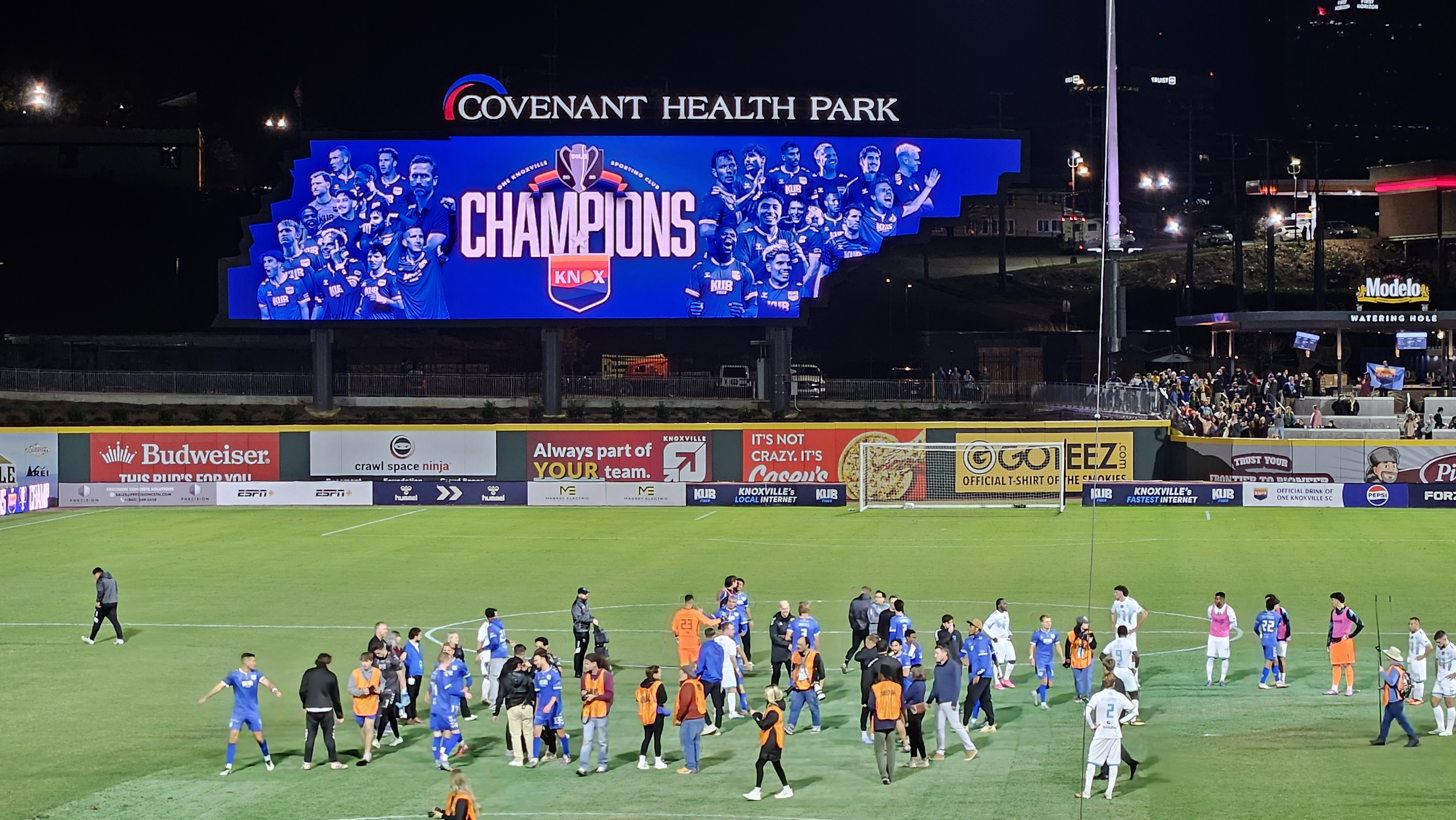
One Knoxville SC winning the 2025 USL League One championship in Covenant Health Park

During their inaugural season as a club in 2022, they used temporary homes through local high school and colleges, specifically Austin East High School, Knoxville Catholic High School, and Maryville College.

=== Regal Soccer Stadium (2023–24) ===
During their first 2 seasons of being in USL League One, they played at Regal Soccer Stadium, home of the Tennessee Lady Volunteers' soccer program. The stadium has a capacity of 3,000 fans. The club achieved their attendance record against Lexington SC, where 2,512 fans attended on March 18, 2023.

=== Covenant Health Park (2025–present) ===
Since the 2025 season, the team has played at Covenant Health Park alongside the Knoxville Smokies, a minor league baseball team. The stadium was designed to convert between soccer and baseball and includes a retractable pitcher's mound.

== Supporters ==
The Scruffs are an independent supporters group for One Knoxville. The group's name is a reference to Scruffy City, a commonly used nickname for Knoxville from the 1982 World's Fair.

== Rivalries ==
=== The Battle of the Barrel (Lexington SC) ===
Lexington SC and One Knoxville joined USL League One as expansion sides together in 2023. The rivalry stems from the Kentucky–Tennessee rivalry as Lexington is home to the University of Kentucky and Knoxville is home to the University of Tennessee. The rivalry name comes from the old name for the matchup between Kentucky and Tennessee in college football where a beer barrel trophy was presented to the winner.

The reported trophy for the winner on aggregate score at the end of the USL1 season is "a full-size whiskey barrel and a bottle of bourbon from a distiller located in the losing club's locale." Despite this, neither fan group has yet to see such a prize as of the start of the 2024 season.

Season	Date	Competition	Stadium	Home team	Result	Away team	Goal scorers	Attendance	Series	Ref
2023	March 18	USL1	Regal Soccer Stadium	One Knoxville SC	2–1	Lexington SC	(KNX) Villalobos 17' (pen.), Keegan 40' (LEX) Smart 28' (pen.)	2,512	KNX 1–0–0	
2023	May 27	USL1	Toyota Stadium (Kentucky)	Lexington SC	1–1	One Knoxville SC	(LEX) Brown 43' (Robertson) (KNX) Keegan 66' (Leinhos)	2,282	KNX 1–1–0	
2023	August 18	USL1	Regal Soccer Stadium	One Knoxville SC	1–0	Lexington SC	(KNX) Kelly-Rosales 49' (Crisler)	2,522	KNX 2–1–0	
2024	March 23	USL1	Regal Soccer Stadium	One Knoxville SC	2–0	Lexington SC	(KNX) Castro Jr 70' (Kelly-Rosales) Ritchie 88' (Ballard)	1,975	KNX 3–1–0	
2024	June 8	USL Jägermeister Cup	Regal Soccer Stadium	One Knoxville SC	2–0	Lexington SC	Crisler 50' (Johnson) Ross 75' (Ritchie)	1,955	KNX 4–1–0	
2024	August 10	USL Jägermeister Cup	Toyota Stadium (Kentucky)	Lexington SC	0–0 5–3	One Knoxville SC	The match ended in a 0–0 draw. Lexington won the penalty shoot-out 5–3 for the extra point in the Central Group standings	1,173	KNX 4–2–0	

=== Smoky Mountain Series (Asheville City SC) ===
As members of USL League Two and of the league's South Central Division, the two clubs created a rivalry called the Smoky Mountain Series. The series was won by head-to-head matches, with the tiebreaker being aggregate score. One Knoxville SC won the 2022 Smoky Mountain Series from a 4–3 aggregate win. Since One Knoxville SC has promoted to USL League One, there is no way for these teams to meet again except the U.S. Open Cup, which happened in 2024 and 2026.

Season	Date	Competition	Stadium	Home team	Result	Away team	Attendance	Series	Ref
2022	May 14	USL2	Austin East High School	One Knoxville SC	1–2	Asheville City SC	2,200	ACSC 1–0–0	
2022	June 21	USL2	Memorial Stadium	Asheville City SC	1–3	One Knoxville SC	?	Tied 1–1–0	
2024	March 20	2024 U.S. Open Cup	Greenwood Field	Asheville City SC	0–2	One Knoxville SC	1,115	KNX 2–1–0	
2026	March 31	2026 U.S. Open Cup	Greenwood Field	Asheville City SC	1–1(3–2 Pens)	One Knoxville SC	?	KNX 3–1–0	

Although the men no longer regularly participate in the rivalry, the rivalry has continued onto the women's side. With the expansion of One Knoxville SC to USL W League, the clubs are now divisional rivals.

Season	Date	Competition	Stadium	Home team	Result	Away team	Attendance	Series	Ref
2025	May 14	USLW	Covenant Health Park	One Knoxville SC	0–1	Asheville City SC	?	ACSC 1–0–0	
2025	June 21	USLW	Greenwood Field	Asheville City SC	2–0	One Knoxville SC	?	ACSC 2–0–0	
2026	May 23	USLW	Greenwood Field	Asheville City SC	TBD	One Knoxville SC	TBD		
2026	June 3	USLW	Maryville College Soccer Field	One Knoxville SC	TBD	Asheville City SC	TBD		

== Players and staff ==
=== Current roster ===
As of March 29, 2026

Note: Flags indicate national team as defined under FIFA eligibility rules; some limited exceptions apply. Players may hold more than one non-FIFA nationality.

No.	Pos.	Nation	Player
2	DF	TPE	Chris Tiao
3	DF	SCO	Finn McRobb
4	DF	ENG	Jordan Skelton
5	DF	JAM	Scott McLeod
6	MF	VEN	Abel Caputo
7	FW	SEN	Babacar Diene
8	MF	USA	John Murphy
9	FW	ISR	Denis Krioutchenkov
10	FW	TTO	Real Gill
11	FW	USA	Kyle Linhares
13	DF	ESP	Dani Fernandez
17	MF	DEN	Mikkel Gøling
18	MF	USA	Steven Cordova

No.	Pos.	Nation	Player
19	FW	USA	Eli Conway
21	MF	GRE	Stavros Zarokostas
22	DF	USA	Will Perkins
23	DF	USA	Donovan Williams
24	GK	USA	Nicholas Lemen
25	GK	USA	Johan Garibay
26	DF	JAM	Jaheim Brown
27	MF	USA	Eli Cook
29	GK	USA	Jonathan Burke
70	FW	SEN	Mouhamed Diop
77	MF	USA	Nicola Rosamilia
89	MF	ENG	Teddy Baker

=== Club management ===
Coaching staff
Head Coach	(United States) Ian Fuller
Assistant Coach	(Serbia) Ilija Ilić
Assistant Coach	(England) James Thomas
Goalkeeping Coach	(United States) Brendan Pulley
Performance Coach	(United States) Aaron Rucker
Front office
Managing Partner	(United States) Drew McKenna
Chief Administrative Officer	(United States) Torrey McMurray

== Record ==
=== Men's team ===
Season	League	Regular Season								Playoffs	U.S. Open Cup	USL Cup
Season	League	Pld	W	D	L	GF	GA	Pts	Pos	Playoffs	U.S. Open Cup	USL Cup
2022	USL2	14	11	1	2	34	10	34	1st	Conference Finals	Not Eligible	—
2023	USL1	32	9	11	12	36	39	38	8th	Did Not Qualify	Second round	—
2024	USL1	22	9	8	5	24	18	39	5th	Quarterfinals	Second round	Group stage
2025	USL1	30	16	9	5	43	26	57	1st	Champions	Third round	Group stage
2026	USL1	32	15	9	8	52	36	54	6th	Quarterfinals	Round of 16	TBD

=== Women's team ===
Season	League	Regular Season								Playoffs
Season	League	Pld	W	D	L	GF	GA	Pts	Pos	Playoffs
2025	USLW	14	3	1	8	12	20	10	7th, South Central	Did Not Qualify
2026	USLW	10	2	3	4	11	13	9	4th, South Central	Did Not Qualify

== Honors ==
- USL League One Regular Season
  - Players' Shield: 2025
- USL League One Playoffs
  - Champions: 2025
