= Phila Dlamini =

South African footballer

Personal information
- Full name: Philakahle Mfan'fikile Dlamini
- Date of birth: 26 February 1999 (age 27)
- Place of birth: Durban, South Africa
- Height: 5 ft 8 in (1.73 m)
- Position: Midfielder

Team information
- Current team: Eintracht Nordhorn

Youth career
- KZN Football Academy
- –2019: Lamontville Golden Arrows
- 2020: AmaZulu

College career
Years	Team	Apps	(Gls)
2022	Saginaw Valley State Cardinals	15	(0)

Senior career*
Years	Team	Apps	(Gls)
2020–2021	AmaZulu	0	(0)
2021–2022	Uthongathi	4	(0)
2023	Lexington SC	28	(1)
2025	Texoma FC	5	(0)
2026–	Eintracht Nordhorn		

International career
2018	South Africa U20		
- * Club domestic league appearances and goals as of 1 November 2025

Philakahle Mfan'fikile Dlamini (born 26 February 1999) is a South African professional soccer player who plays as a midfielder for German club, Eintracht Nordhorn.

== Career ==
=== Early career ===
Dlamini spent time with the KZN Football Academy and the reserve team of Lamontville Golden Arrows, making five appearances for the Golden Arrows' reserve team in the Diski Challenge League. After graduating from the University of KwaZulu-Natal, Dlamini signed with AmaZulu. He appeared on the bench for AmaZulu's South African Premier Division first team side, but never made a first-team appearance. In 2021, Dlamini joined National First Division side Uthongathi and made four league appearances.

In 2022, Dlamini moved to the United States to play college soccer at Saginaw Valley State University. He made 15 appearances for the Cardinals in 2022, also adding four assists, earning him first-team All-Midwest Region honors from the United Soccer Coaches and first-team all-conference accolades from the Great Lakes Intercollegiate Athletic Conference.

=== Lexington SC ===
On 19 January 2023, Dlamini signed with USL League One side Lexington SC ahead of their inaugural season.

=== Texoma FC ===
On 18 March 2025, Dlamini joined USL League One side Texoma FC.
