= Owen Green (footballer, born 1998) =

English footballer

Personal information
- Date of birth: 9 September 1998 (age 28)
- Place of birth: Leicester, England
- Height: 5 ft 9 in (1.75 m)
- Position: Left-back

College career
| Years | Team | Apps | (Gls) |
| 2017–2021 | FIU Panthers | 41 | (3) |

Senior career*
| Years | Team | Apps | (Gls) |
| 2018 | Weston FC | 7 | (0) |
| 2021 | South Georgia Tormenta 2 | 10 | (2) |
| 2022 | South Georgia Tormenta | 25 | (0) |
| 2023 | Lexington SC | 30 | (1) |
| 2024–2025 | Chattanooga Red Wolves | 37 | (0) |
- * Club domestic league appearances and goals as of October 31, 2025

Owen Green (born 9 September 1998) is an English footballer who plays as a defender.

== Career ==
=== Youth, college & amateur ===
Green was born in Leicester, England to an English father and Filipino mother. He was raised in Miami, Florida, attending Doral Academy Preparatory School.

In 2017, Green attended Florida International University to play college soccer. In four seasons with the Panthers, Green made 41 appearances, scoring three goals and tallying five assists.

While at college, Green played in the USL League Two with Weston FC in 2018, and with South Georgia Tormenta 2 in 2021.

=== Professional ===
On 1 April 2022, Green moved up to Tormenta's USL League One side South Georgia Tormenta. He made his debut for the club on 7 April, appearing as an injury-time substitute during a 1–0 win over Charleston Battery in the U.S. Open Cup. Green's Tormenta FC team won the 2022 USL League One championship.

On 13 January 2023, Green signed with USL League One expansion club Lexington SC.

On 18 May 2024, it was announced that Green has signed for USL League One club Chattanooga Red Wolves in a short-term deal.
