= Seo-In Kim =

South Korean footballer

Personal information
- Full name: Seo-In Kim
- Date of birth: 18 April 1995 (age 31)
- Place of birth: Seongnam, South Korea
- Height: 5 ft 8 in (1.73 m)
- Position: Attacking midfielder

Youth career
- 2010–2013: Sporting Kansas City

College career
Years	Team	Apps	(Gls)
2013–2015	Duke Blue Devils	37	(2)
2015–2017	UC Santa Barbara Gauchos	41	(2)

Senior career*
Years	Team	Apps	(Gls)
2018	SIMA Águilas	5	(1)
2018–2019	Qormi	12	(0)
2019	→ Zápy (loan)	3	(0)
2020	Oakland Roots	2	(1)
2021–2022	Chicago House	15	(0)
2023	Lexington SC	27	(1)
2024–2025	Life Sihanoukville	28	(9)
2025–2026	Phnom Penh Crown	0	(0)
- * Club domestic league appearances and goals as of 13:25, 30 May 2026 (UTC)

Seo-In Kim (born 18 April 1995) is a South Korean professional footballer who plays as a midfielder.

== Early life and education ==
Kim was born on April 18, 1995, in Seongnam, South Korea to Brian Jin and Jennifer Sunhee Kim. Soon after, he and his family emigrated from Korea and settled in Overland Park, Kansas. Seo-In Kim has one older brother who played soccer at the Division 1 collegiate level for the University of Tulsa and the United States Air Force Academy.

== Career ==
=== Youth career ===
Seo-In Kim was a member of the US Youth Soccer Olympic Development Program. He made appearances in the Region II team in 2008 and 2009.

In 2008, Seo-In Kim was invited to the U14 US Men's National Team camp in Boston, Massachusetts.

Seo-In Kim played for Blue Valley West High School in Overland Park, Kansas. In his 3 active years, Seo-In Kim had a successful high school career. In his sophomore year, the Jaguars won the 2010 6A Kansas State Championship. At the time, Top Drawer Soccer ranked Kim #23 nationally.

Starting his youth career with the Kansas City Legends Academy team, Kim was selected to play for the Sporting Kansas City Academy. During his time at the academy, He was frequently brought up to train with the Major League Soccer first team and made three appearances with the MLS reserve team against KC Brass, Real Salt Lake, and Chicago Fire. In 2011, he attended the U17 Generations Adidas Cup. The following season, Kim was brought up to the U18 squad by head coach, Paul Rideout, making him the youngest player rostered. In 2013, Sporting Kansas City nominated Seo-In Kim for the US Soccer Federation's Young Male Athlete of the Year Award. In his last season with Sporting, Seo-In started 20 matches and scored 3 goals. Kim was ranked #1 in Kansas and the Midwest Region. He was also ranked #63 nationally by TopDrawerSoccer.com.

=== Duke University ===
At Duke University, Seo-In Kim made 37 appearances and 14 starts. Kim played in all 19 games his rookie season (2013) registering him 4 assists. In his sophomore season, Kim made 18 appearances and 5 starts earning him 2 goals and 1 assist.

=== University of California, Santa Barbara ===
Seo-In Kim transferred to UCSB following his sophomore season at Duke University. In 2015, he ended his junior year with 22 appearances, 2 goals, and 1 assist. Highlighting his UCSB career, Kim scored a diving header against Blue Green Rivals, Cal Poly. Seo-In scored the opening goal against Clemson during the 2015 NCAA Division I Men's Soccer Tournament. Kim utilized a medical redshirt for the 2016 season due to an ACL tear. In 2017, he played his senior season appearing in all 19 matches.

=== SIMA Águilas ===
In 2018, Seo-In Kim briefly played for SIMA Águilas in the USL League 2. In his time there he played in 5 games and registered 1 goal. Kim was brought in by Michael Potempa in anticipation of Orlando City B's return to USL League 1.

=== Qormi F.C. ===
In July 2018, Kim signed for Qormi F.C. of the Maltese Premier League. He started in 11 matches out of 12 appearances, one being in the Maltese FA Trophy. Kim was selected as Man of the Match during Week 1 and 8. In January 2019, Qormi announced that Kim was not retained. Kim requested for his release from Qormi FC and became a free agent on January 4, 2019.

=== SK Zápy ===
Kim joined Czech club SK Zápy in Spring 2019.

=== Oakland Roots SC ===
In July 2020, Kim signed with Oakland Roots SC of the National Independent Soccer Association ahead of the team's Fall 2020 season.

=== Lexington SC ===
On 23 January 2023, Kim signed with Lexington SC of USL League One as part of the club's inaugural season.

=== Life FC ===
Kim signed with Life FC of the Cambodian Premier League in July 2024.
