= Austin Causey =

American soccer player (born 2001)

Personal information
- Date of birth: August 20, 2001 (age 25)
- Place of birth: Easton, Massachusetts, United States
- Height: 1.87 m (6 ft 2 in)
- Position: Goalkeeper

Team information
- Current team: New York Red Bulls II
- Number: 55

Youth career
- –2016: Richmond United
- 2016–2020: New England Revolution

Senior career*
Years	Team	Apps	(Gls)
2021–2022	Richmond Kickers	1	(0)
2023–2024	Lexington SC	9	(0)
2025–	New York Red Bulls II	12	(0)
- * Club domestic league appearances and goals as of November 15, 2026

Austin Causey (born August 20, 2001) is an American soccer player who plays as a goalkeeper for MLS Next Pro club New York Red Bulls II.

== Career ==
=== Youth ===
Causey began his youth career with Richmond United, where he played with the under-14 and under-16 teams. During the 2015–16 season, he posted a 61.6 save percentage. In 2016, Causey returned to Massachusetts to play for New England Revolution Academy, where he remained for four seasons.

=== Professional ===
On April 6, 2021, Causey signed his first professional contract with USL League One side Richmond Kickers. On December 9, 2021, it was announced that Causey would re-sign with the Kickers for their upcoming 2022 season. He went on to make his professional debut on March 6, 2022, starting in a 4–1 win over North Carolina FC.

On January 25, 2023, Causey was announced as a new signing for Lexington SC ahead of their inaugural season in the USL League One. In his first season with the club, he made eight league starts. On October 17, 2023, Causey was selected to the USL League One Team of the Week for his performance in a 1–1 draw with Greenville Triumph SC. He was released by Lexington following their 2024 season.

On March 14, 2025, Causey was announced as a new signing for MLS Next Pro side New York Red Bulls II. On June 4, 2025, he made his first start for New York Red Bulls II in a 5–2 victory over Crown Legacy FC. On 8 November 2025, Causey helped New York to a 3-3 tie in regulation against Colorado Rapids 2, a match New York would win 4-3, in a penalty shootout at Sports Illustrated Stadium to claim club’s first MLS NEXT Pro Cup title.

== Personal ==
Austin is the son of former professional soccer player Jeff Causey.
