= Will Baynham =

Australian footballer

Personal information
- Full name: William Baynham
- Date of birth: 13 June 1997 (age 29)
- Place of birth: Brisbane, Australia
- Height: 6 ft 3 in (1.91 m)
- Position: Forward

Youth career
- 1999–2015: Brisbane City
- 2015–2017: AFC Bournemouth

College career
Years	Team	Apps	(Gls)
2018	Yavapai Roughriders	29	(25)
2019	UC Santa Barbara Gauchos	24	(10)

Senior career*
Years	Team	Apps	(Gls)
2018	FC Golden State Force	4	(0)
2019	Reading United	4	(1)
2019	Lions FC	1	(0)
2020–2022	Queen's Park	17	(5)
2023–2024	Lexington SC	12	(1)
2024	Preston Lions	16	(6)
- * Club domestic league appearances and goals as of 14:53, 17 August 2024 (UTC)

William Baynham (born 13 June 1997) is an Australian professional soccer player who last played as a forward for Preston Lions in the Victoria Premier League 1.

== Career ==
=== Early career ===
Baynham played youth football for Brisbane City from the under-12's side through to the under-18's before moving to England to join the AFC Bournemouth academy. He left England to pursue college soccer opportunities in the United States.

He spent a season at Yavapai College, where he scored 25 goals in 29 appearances for the Roughriders. He transferred to the University of California, Santa Barbara in 2019, scoring ten goals in 24 game, tallying eight assists for the Gauchos.

While at college, Baynham also spent summers playing in the USL League Two, with a spell at FC Golden State Force in 2018, and a spell at Reading United in 2019.

After leaving college, Baynham signed with National Premier Leagues Queensland side Lions FC on 12 August 2019, where he made a single appearance. In early 2020, Baynham had a trial with USL Championship side Phoenix Rising and with Canadian Premier League side Halifax Wanderers.

Baynham was eligible for selection in the 2020 MLS SuperDraft but went undrafted.

=== Professional career ===
On 22 September 2020, Baynham signed his first professional contract with Scottish League Two side Queen's Park, where he helped the Spiders to promotion to the Scottish League One with five goals in 17 league appearances and earned himself a new one-year contract. He was released by Queen's Park in the summer of 2022.

On 12 January 2023, Baynham returned to the United States and signed with USL League One side Lexington SC ahead of their inaugural season.

== Personal life ==
Baynham holds Australian, Canadian, and British citizenship.
