= Drew Patterson =

American soccer player (born 2001)

Personal information
- Full name: Drew Thomas Patterson
- Date of birth: April 20, 2001 (age 25)
- Place of birth: Cranford, New Jersey, United States
- Height: 6 ft 3 in (1.91 m)
- Positions: Winger; forward

Youth career
- 2013–2019: STA Soccer

College career
Years	Team	Apps	(Gls)
2019	Marist Red Foxes	0	(0)
2020–2022	Cal Poly Mustangs	27	(2)

Senior career*
Years	Team	Apps	(Gls)
2021	Nomads SC		
2022	Cedar Stars Rush	7	(4)
2023	Lexington SC	7	(0)
- * Club domestic league appearances and goals as of October 16, 2023

Drew Thomas Patterson (born April 20, 2001) is an American soccer player who plays as a forward.

== Career ==
=== Youth, college & amateur ===
Patterson was born in Cranford, New Jersey on April 20, 2001. He played six years of club soccer for STA Soccer, where he was a four-time New Jersey State Cup finalist as well as a two-time regional finalist. Patterson also played two years of varsity soccer at Cranford High School. At Cranford, Patterson won a Mountain Conference title as a junior and earned first-team All-Conference, first-team All-County, and was named to the All-State team.

In 2019, Patterson attended Marist College to play college soccer, but redshirted his entire freshman season. In 2020, Patterson transferred to California Polytechnic State University, San Luis Obispo, but the 2020 season was canceled due to the COVID-19 pandemic. During his two seasons with the Mustangs, Patterson made 27 appearances, scoring two goals and tallying three assists.

While at college, Patterson spent time with United Premier Soccer League side Nomads SC and USL League Two side Cedar Stars Rush, where he scored four goals in seven appearances for Cedar Stars during their 2022 season.

=== Professional ===
On January 23, 2023, Patterson signed with USL League One side Lexington SC ahead of their inaugural season.
