= Kaelon Fox =

American soccer player

Personal information
- Full name: Kaelon Paul Fox
- Date of birth: May 31, 1995 (age 31)
- Place of birth: Atlanta, Georgia, United States
- Height: 6 ft 3 in (1.91 m)
- Position: Defender

Youth career
- Javanon SC
- Lexington FC
- –2012: St. Xavier Tigers

College career
Years	Team	Apps	(Gls)
2013–2016	Kentucky Wildcats	48	(5)
2017	Saint Francis Red Flash	18	(3)

Senior career*
Years	Team	Apps	(Gls)
2014	Carolina Dynamo	8	(2)
2016	Portland Timbers U23s	7	(0)
2017	Reading United	2	(0)
2018	Mississippi Brilla	10	(0)
2019	Völsungur ÍF		
2020	Thór	1	(0)
2020	→ Völsungur ÍF (loan)		
2021–2022	FC Tucson	53	(2)
2023–2024	Lexington SC	49	(1)
- * Club domestic league appearances and goals as of November 21, 2024

Kaelon Paul Fox (born May 31, 1995) is an American retired soccer player.

== Playing career ==
=== College and amateur ===
Fox played three seasons of college soccer at the University of Kentucky between 2013 and 2016, including a redshirted season in 2015. With the Wildcats, Fox made 48 appearances and scored 5 goals. In 2013, Fox was named to the SEC First-Year Honor Roll. In 2017, Fox transferred to Saint Francis University, where he made 18 appearances and scored a single goal.

During and after college, Fox spent time in the USL PDL with Carolina Dynamo, Portland Timbers U23s, Reading United AC, and Mississippi Brilla.

=== Völsungur ÍF ===
In February 2019, it was announced that Fox had signed his first professional contract with 2nd-tier Icelandic side Völsungur ÍF. Fox won the player of the season award in his only season with the club.

=== Thór ===
Fox moved to fellow top division Icelandic side Thór in 2020, but only made a single appearance during a season affected by the COVID-19 pandemic. He spent time on loan with his previous club Völsungur.

=== FC Tucson ===
On February 26, 2021, Fox returned to the United States, joining USL League One side FC Tucson. He made his debut for the club on May 1, 2021, starting in a 3–1 loss to South Georgia Tormenta.

=== Lexington SC ===
On January 9, 2023, Fox was announced as the first-ever signing for USL League One club Lexington SC. He was released by Lexington following their 2024 season. Fox announced his retirement from soccer via his personal Twitter account on February 3, 2025.
