= Georgetown Tigers =

- University: Georgetown College
- Nickname: Tigers
- Association: NAIA
- Conference: Mid-South (primary)
- Athletic director: Brian Evans
- Location: Georgetown, Kentucky
- Varsity teams: 19 (9 men's, 9 women's, 1 co-ed)
- Football stadium: Toyota Stadium
- Basketball arena: Davis-Reid Alumni Gym
- Baseball stadium: Robert N. Wilson Field
- Softball stadium: Tiger Softball Complex
- Soccer field: Toyota Stadium; GC Soccer Complex
- Lacrosse stadium: Toyota Stadium
- Tennis venue: Lackey Tennis Center
- Colors: Black and orange
- Website: georgetowncollegeathletics.com

The Georgetown Tigers are the athletic teams that represent Georgetown College located in Georgetown, Kentucky, in intercollegiate sports as a member of the National Association of Intercollegiate Athletics (NAIA), primarily competing in the Mid-South Conference (MSC) since the 1995–96 academic year. The Tigers previously competed in the Kentucky Intercollegiate Athletic Conference (KIAC; now known as the River States Conference (RSC) since the 2016–17 school year) from 1916–17 to 1994–95.

== History ==
=== Attempt to move to NCAA Division II ===
On April 28, 2012, the college officially announced that after a year-long study, it had decided to transfer its athletics program to NCAA Division II. It was presumed they would join the newly formed Great Midwest Athletic Conference (G-MAC). However, on July 24, 2012, the college announced that its application to join the NCAA was denied. The membership committee had notified them on July 12 that "it felt that Georgetown College was not ready to enter the process at this time." As of 2021, Georgetown hasn't yet re-applied to transition into NCAA Division II.

== Varsity teams ==
Georgetown competes in 19 intercollegiate varsity sports:

| Men's sports | Women's sports |
|---|---|
| Baseball | Basketball |
| Basketball | Cross country |
| Cross country | Golf |
| Football | Lacrosse |
| Golf | Soccer |
| Soccer | Softball |
| Tennis | Tennis |
| Track and field^{1} | Track and field^{1} |
| Volleyball | Volleyball |
| Wrestling | Wrestling |
Co-ed sports
Esports
Cheerleading
^{1} – includes both indoor and outdoor

=== Football ===
==== Accomplishments ====
- National Champions – 1991, 2000, 2001
- National Finalist – 1991, 1999, 2000, 2001, 2002
- National Semi-Finalist – 2004, 2011
- 19 Mid-South Conference Champions – 1987, 1989, 1990, 1991, 1992, 1993, 1998, 1999, 2000, 2001, 2002, 2003, 2004, 2005, 2006, 2010, 2011, 2012, 2015
- NAIA National Coach of the Year – Bill Cronin – 2000, 2001

=== Men's basketball ===
==== Accomplishments ====
- 38 appearances in the NAIA National Tournament (Tournament Record)
- 28 consecutive NAIA appearances (Tournament Record)
- 57 wins in National Tournament History
- 22 Sweet Sixteen appearances
- 14 Elite Eight appearances
- 12 Fab Four appearances
- 7 National Title games
- 3 National Championships

== Facilities ==
Georgetown's athletics facilities includes:

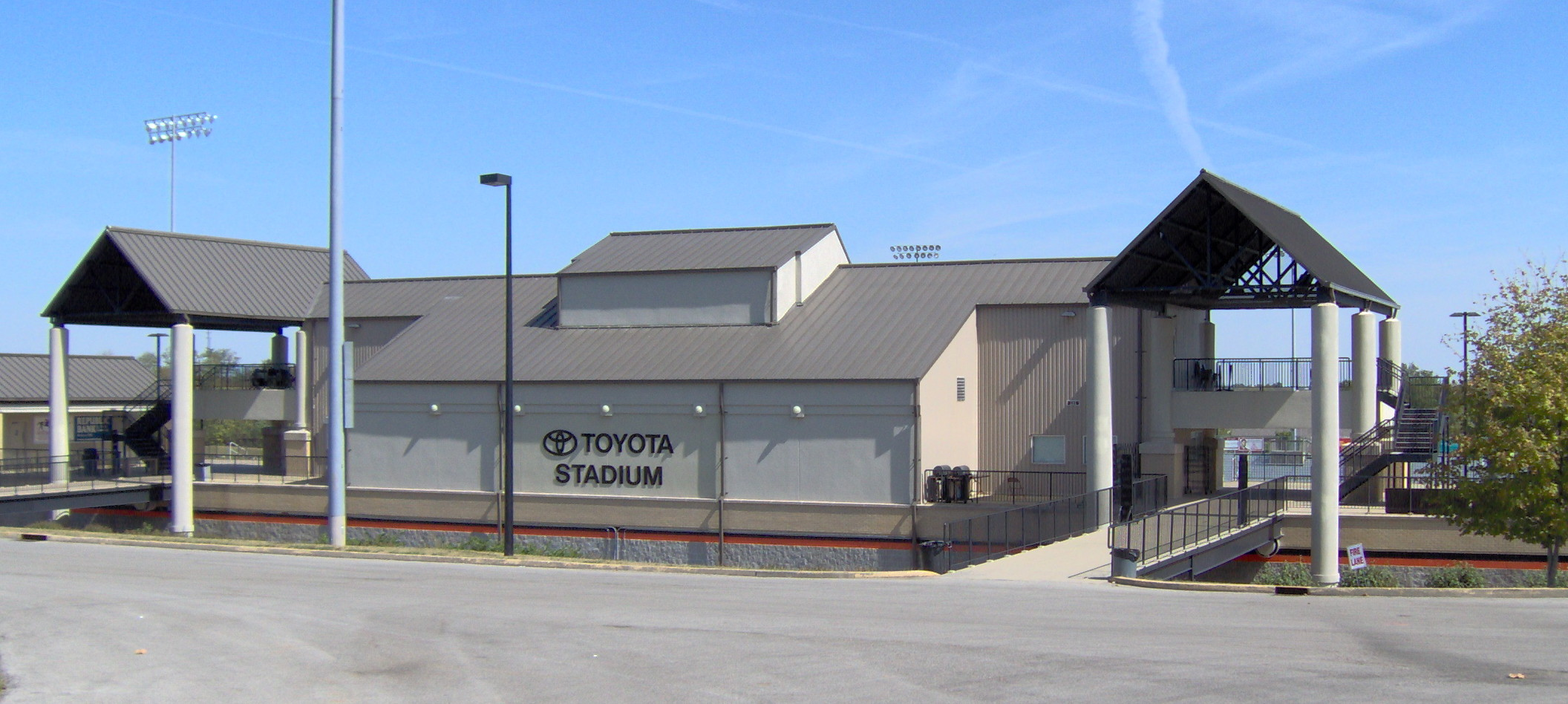
Toyota Stadium

| Venue | Sport(s) | Capacity |
|---|---|---|
| Toyota Stadium | Football; Soccer; Lacrosse | 5,000 |
| Davis-Reid Alumni Gym | Basketball; Volleyball | 2,500 |
| Robert N. Wilson Field | Baseball | 500 |
| Tiger Softball Complex | Softball | 500 |
| Lackey Center | Tennis | 150 |
| GC Soccer Complex | Soccer | 500 |

== National championships ==
| Sport | Assoc. | Division | Titles | Winning years | Ref. |
|---|---|---|---|---|---|
| Football | NAIA | Division I | 2 | 2000, 2001 | |
| Football | NAIA | Division II | 1 | 1991 | |
| Basketball (men's) | NAIA | Division I | 3 | 1998, 2013, 2019 | |

== Notable athletes ==
- Billy Ray Cyrus – American country singer (attended, but did not graduate)
