= Toyota Stadium (Kentucky) =

Stadium in Georgetown, Kentucky, US

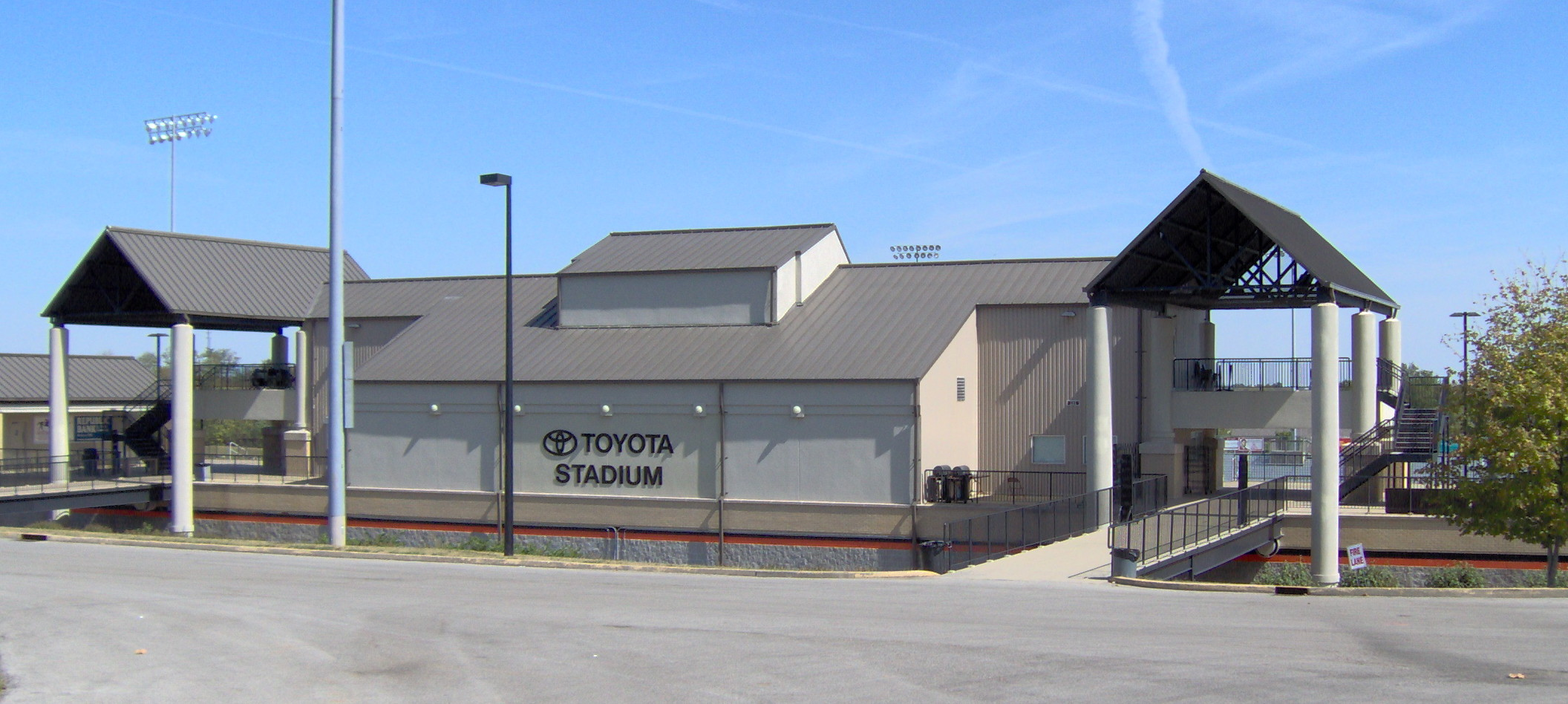
- Entrance to the stadium as seen in 2007

- Location within Kentucky Location within the United States
- Interactive map of Toyota Stadium
- Address: United States
- Location: Georgetown, Kentucky
- Coordinates: 38°12′16″N 84°32′44″W
- Owner: Georgetown College
- Operator: Georgetown College Athletics
- Capacity: 5,000 (expandable to 20,000)
- Type: Stadium
- Current use: Football; Soccer; Lacrosse

Construction
- Opened: 1997; 29 years ago

Tenants
- Georgetown Tigers (NAIA) teams: football, soccer, lacrosse; Lexington SC (USL1) 2023–2024; Scott County High School 1997–2018; Cincinnati Bengals (NFL training camp) 1997–2011

Toyota Stadium is a stadium located on the campus of Georgetown College in Georgetown, Kentucky, United States. The stadium serves as home venue to Georgetown Tigers football, soccer, and lacrosse teams. It also previously hosted Lexington SC of USL League One and USL W League and the training camp for the Cincinnati Bengals. The stadium, which holds 5,000 and is expandable to 20,000, was built in 1997.

It was also used by the local Scott County High School for home high school football games from 1997 until the opening of Great Crossing High School in 2019; the two high schools now share Great Crossing's football stadium.

In 2023, Lexington SC played their inaugural season at Toyota Stadium. At the end of the season, the team announced they would play the first half of the 2024 season at the stadium until a soccer-specific stadium was completed in Lexington

== See also ==
- List of sports venues with the name Toyota
