= Nico Brown =

Jamaican footballer (born 1998)

Personal information
- Full name: Nicolas Brown
- Date of birth: 11 August 1998 (age 28)
- Place of birth: Atlanta, Georgia, United States
- Height: 1.80 m (5 ft 11 in)
- Positions: Winger; forward

Team information
- Current team: Birmingham Legion
- Number: 77

Youth career
- –2015: Baltimore Celtic
- 2015–2016: D.C. United

College career
| Years | Team | Apps | (Gls) |
| 2016–2019 | Loyola Greyhounds | 62 | (9) |

Senior career*
| Years | Team | Apps | (Gls) |
| 2016 | Baltimore Bohemians | 3 | (0) |
| 2019 | FC Baltimore Christos | 0 | (0) |
| 2021 | Maryland Bobcats | 7 | (0) |
| 2021–2022 | Greenville Triumph | 24 | (3) |
| 2023–2025 | Lexington SC | 52 | (11) |
| 2025 | → Forward Madison (loan) | 30 | (1) |
| 2026– | Birmingham Legion | 20 | (1) |

International career
| 2026– | Jamaica | 1 | (0) |
- * Club domestic league appearances and goals as of November 2, 2026

Nicolas Brown (born 11 August 1998) is a professional football player who plays as a winger and forward for USL Championship club Birmingham Legion. Born in the United States, he has represented the Jamaica national team.

== Career ==
=== Youth, College & Amateur ===
Brown played high school soccer at McDonogh School, where he was a two-time USYSA National Champion and MVP, as well as the USYSA National Championships Golden Boot Winner in 2015. In 2014, Brown was an all-state and all-metro selection in 2014 after scoring 18 goals and assisting eight others as a junior. He also played club soccer with Baltimore Celtic, and spent a year with the D.C. United academy as a senior.

In 2016, Brown attended Loyola University Maryland to play college soccer, where he went on to make 62 appearances, scoring nine goals and tallying five assists. In 2018, Brown was named All-Patriot League Second Team, and in 2019 was an All-Patriot League Third Team.

While at college, Brown also played in the USL PDL with Baltimore Bohemians during their 2016, making three appearances. In 2019, he played with NPSL side FC Baltimore Christos, but didn't appear for the club.

=== Professional career ===
For their Spring 2021 season, Brown joined NISA side Maryland Bobcats. He played three of the team's NISA Legends Cup matches, scoring a goal against California United Strikers, and made five regular season appearances. He returned to the team for the Fall 2021 season and made two more starts.

On September 1, 2021, Brown transferred to USL League One club Greenville Triumph. Following the 2022 season, his contract option was declined by Greenville.

Brown signed with USL League One expansion club Lexington SC on January 20, 2023. Brown re-signed with Lexington on January 16, 2025, ahead of the club's first season competing in the USL Championship.

On February 4, 2025, it was announced that Brown would be joining Forward Madison on a year-long loan.

In February 2026, Birmingham Legion FC of the USL Championship announced they had signed Brown to a contact ahead of the 2026 season.

=== International ===
Brown is of Jamaican heritage and has represented Jamaica at under-17 level.
