= 2023 Richmond Kickers season =

Richmond Kickers
2023 season
- Owner: 22 Holdings, LLC
- Head coach: Darren Sawatzky
- Stadium: City Stadium
- USL League One: 11th
- U.S. Open Cup: Third round
- Top goalscorer: League: Emiliano Terzaghi (10 goals); All: Emiliano Terzaghi (12)
- Highest home attendance: 6,000 (vs. Charlotte Independence – April 1); 6,000 (vs. Tormenta FC – September 30)
- Lowest home attendance: 3,143 (vs. North Carolina FC – August 9)
- Average home league attendance: 4,786
| Home colors | Away colors | Third colors |

The 2023 Richmond Kickers season was the club's 31st season in existence, their fifth season in USL League One, and their 19th season in the third tier of American soccer. The Kickers will be led by fourth-year head coach, Darren Sawatzky. The USL League One season started on March 18, 2023.

This was the first season since 2016 without Matt Bolduc who left the Kickers when his contract expired after six seasons, but would later resign for the club in the 2025 and 2026 seasons. This is also the first season since 2019 without Jonathan Bolanos who signed for Huntsville City.

== Background ==
The 2022 season was the club's 30th season of existence, their fourth season in USL League One, and third year under head coach Darren Sawatzky. The Kickers had their strongest regular season showing since 2013 and won the USL League One regular season title with 51 points; they amassed a record of 14 wins, seven losses, and nine draws. Striker Emiliano Terzaghi led the Kickers and USL League One in scoring with 18 goals.

Outside of USL League One, the Kickers participated in the U.S. Open Cup, and the league playoffs, which they qualified for with their first-place finish during the regular season. The Kickers reached the fourth round of the Open Cup, before losing to Major League Soccer expansion side Charlotte FC. The Kickers began the Playoffs in the semifinal round on October 29, where they were eliminated.

== Transfers ==
=== Transfers in ===
| Date | Position | No. | Name | From | Fee/notes | Ref. |
|---|---|---|---|---|---|---|
| December 13, 2022 | FW | 8 | (Brazil) João Gomiero | (United States) North Carolina Fusion | Free | |
| December 15, 2022 | DF | 25 | (Germany) Michael Hornsby | (United States) Central Valley Fuego | Free | |
| January 31, 2023 | FW | 19 | (United States) Justin Sukow | (United States) Forward Madison | Free | |
| February 2, 2023 | DF | 34 | (United States) Beckett Howell | (United States) Richmond Kickers Academy | Free | |
| February 2, 2023 | MF | 33 | (United States) Gabe Cox | (United States) Richmond Kickers Academy | Free | |
| February 7, 2023 | DF | 16 | (United States) Jake Mecham | (United States) Denver Pioneers | Free | |
| February 9, 2023 | FW | 99 | (Grenada) Kharlton Belmar | (United States) Colorado Springs Switchbacks | Free | |
| June 12, 2023 | FW | 17 | (United States) Ryan Sierakowski | (United States) Tormenta | Free | |

=== Transfers out ===
| Date | Position | No. | Name | To | Fee/notes | Ref. |
|---|---|---|---|---|---|---|
| December 7, 2021 | MF | 7 | (United States) Matt Bolduc | | Option declined | |
| December 7, 2021 | MF | 11 | (Argentina) Leonardo Baima | | Option declined | |
| December 7, 2021 | GK | 13 | (United States) Austin Causey | (United States) Lexington SC | Option declined | |
| December 7, 2021 | MF | 20 | (El Salvador) Christian Molina | | Option declined | |
| December 13, 2022 | MF | 8 | (United States) Ethan Bryant | (United States) Sporting Kansas City | Undisclosed | |
| January 4, 2023 | DF | 5 | (United States) Stuart Ritchie | (United States) Columbus Crew | Free | |
| February 6, 2023 | MF | 17 | (United States) Jonathan Bolanos | (United States) Huntsville City | Free | |

== Non-competitive ==
=== Preseason exhibitions ===
| February 11, 2023 1 | Richmond Kickers | 1–1 | Loudoun United FC | Midlothian, Virginia |
| 1:00 p.m. EDT | Gomiero 62' | Report | Williamson 54' | Stadium: River City Sportsplex; Attendance: 100 |

| February 15, 2023 2 | Richmond Kickers | 3–3 | VCU Rams | Glen Allen, Virginia |
| 1:00 p.m. EDT | Terzaghi; Pavone; Gomiero | Report | White; Gallegos; Toure | Stadium: Strikers Soccer Complex; Attendance: 50 |

| February 18, 2023 3 | VCU Rams | 2–3 | Richmond Kickers | Richmond, Virginia |
| 1:00 p.m. EDT | | | | Stadium: Sports Backers Stadium |

| February 25, 2023 4 | Richmond Kickers | 3–1 | Old Dominion Monarchs | Richmond, Virginia |
| 11:00 a.m. EDT | | | | Stadium: City Stadium |

| February 25, 2023 5 | Richmond Kickers | 4–2 | VCU Rams | Richmond, Virginia |
| 2:00 p.m. EDT | | Report | | Stadium: City Stadium |

| March 1, 2023 6 | Richmond Kickers | 2–0 | James Madison Dukes | Richmond, Virginia |
| 11:00 a.m. EDT | Sukow 21'; Gomiero 41' | | | Stadium: City Stadium; Attendance: 350 |

| March 1, 2023 7 | Richmond Kickers | 2–2 | Old Dominion Monarchs | Richmond, Virginia |
| 2:00 p.m. EDT | Belmar 32', 54' | | Jenkins 45'; Gallaway 68' | Stadium: City Stadium; Attendance: 350 |

| March 11, 2023 8 | Crown Legacy FC | 1–1 | Richmond Kickers | Matthews, North Carolina |
| | | | | Stadium: Mecklenburg County Sportsplex |

=== Midseason friendly ===
| July 18, 2023 | Richmond Kickers | 2–4 | (Guatemala) Comunicaciones | Richmond, Virginia |
| 7:30 p.m. EDT | Bentley 58'; Sierakowski 90' | | Anangonó 43'; Lezcano 57', 65'; González 75' | Stadium: City Stadium |

== Competitions ==
=== USL League One ===
==== Table ====
| Pos | Team | Pld | W | L | T | GF | GA | GD | Pts |
|---|---|---|---|---|---|---|---|---|---|
| 8 | One Knoxville SC | 32 | 9 | 12 | 11 | 36 | 39 | −3 | 38 |
| 9 | Lexington SC | 32 | 7 | 14 | 11 | 46 | 57 | −11 | 32 |
| 10 | Chattanooga Red Wolves SC | 32 | 8 | 17 | 7 | 46 | 65 | −19 | 31 |
| 11 | Richmond Kickers | 32 | 6 | 15 | 11 | 42 | 55 | −13 | 29 |
| 12 | Central Valley Fuego FC | 32 | 6 | 21 | 5 | 36 | 61 | −25 | 23 |

Source: USL League One
Rules for classification: 1) points; 2) total wins; 3) total goal differential; 4) total goals scored; 5) points earned against top four Conference finishers; 6) disciplinary points; 7) drawing of lots.

==== Regular season ====
All times in Eastern Time Zone.

| March 18, 2023 1 | Charlotte Independence | 0–0 | Richmond Kickers | Charlotte, North Carolina |
| 5:00 p.m. | Dutey (yellow card) 43' | Report | Morán (yellow card) 7'; Hornsby (yellow card) 31'; Sukow (yellow card) 75'; Terzaghi (yellow card) 90+5' | Stadium: American Legion Memorial Stadium; Attendance: 3,947; Referee: Danielle Chesky |

| March 25, 2023 2 | Greenville Triumph SC | 0–1 | Richmond Kickers | Greenville, South Carolina |
| 7:00 p.m. | Labovitz (yellow card) 90+5' | Report | Belmar 12'; Fitch (yellow card) 46'; Vinyals (yellow card) 82'; Pavone (yellow card) 90+4' | Stadium: Paladin Stadium; Attendance: 2,879; Referee: Abdou Ndiaye |

| April 1, 2023 3 | Richmond Kickers | 1–2 | Charlotte Independence | Richmond, Virginia |
| 6:00 p.m. | Gordon 25' (yellow card) 90+7'; Belmar (yellow card) 58'; Vinyals (yellow card) 75' | Report | Dimick 13'; Ciss (yellow card) 51'; Hornsby 62' (o.g.); Spielman (yellow card) 77'; Johnson (yellow card) 79'; Bennett (yellow card) 88'; Pack (yellow card) 90+2' | Stadium: City Stadium; Attendance: 6,000; Referee: John Matto |

| April 15, 2023 4 | Richmond Kickers | 0–0 | Northern Colorado Hailstorm FC | Richmond, Virginia |
| 6:00 p.m. | Aune (yellow card) 81' | Report | Lukić (yellow card) 18'; Rendón (yellow card) 65' | Stadium: City Stadium; Attendance: 5,024; Referee: Gary Gutierrez |

| April 29, 2023 5 | Tormenta FC | 1–3 | Richmond Kickers | Statesboro, Georgia |
| 7:30 p.m. | Matheus Cassini (yellow card) 26'; Fonseca (yellow card) 42'; Adjei 82' | Report | Aune 7'; Sukow 41', (yellow card) 44'; Terzaghi 45+2'; Hornsby (yellow card) 60'; Fitzgerald (yellow card) 71'; Howell (yellow card) 90' | Stadium: Tormenta Stadium; Attendance: 1,263; Referee: Luis Arroyo |

| May 5, 2023 6 | Richmond Kickers | 0–0 | Union Omaha | Richmond, Virginia |
| 7:00 p.m. | | Report | Dos Santos (yellow card) 67' | Stadium: City Stadium; Attendance: 5,418; Referee: John Matto |

| May 13, 2023 7 | Greenville Triumph SC | 2–2 | Richmond Kickers | Greenville, South Carolina |
| 7:00 p.m. | Lucas Coutinho 3'; Fricke 27' | Report | Aune 59'; Pavone 82'; Gordon (yellow card) 90+5'; Sukow (yellow card) 90+6' | Stadium: Paladin Stadium; Attendance: 2,023; Referee: Olvin Oliva |

| May 17, 2023 8 | North Carolina FC | 3–2 | Richmond Kickers | Cary, North Carolina |
| 7:00 p.m. | Anderson 62'; Perez 73'; McLaughlin 76'; Holliday (yellow card) 83'; Benton (yellow card) 88' | Report | João Silva 29', 32'; Fitch (yellow card) 65'; Aune (yellow card) 90+4' | Stadium: WakeMed Soccer Park; Attendance: 1,377; Referee: José Carlos Rivero |

| May 20, 2023 9 | Richmond Kickers | 2–1 | Lexington SC | Richmond, Virginia |
| 7:00 p.m. | Belmar 60'; João Silva 76', (yellow card) 90+2'; Bentley (yellow card) 87'; Sukow (yellow card) 90+2'; Morán (yellow card) 90+8' | Report | Dlamini (yellow card) 28'; Mané (yellow card) 68'; Smart 90+3' (pen.); Green (yellow card) 90+4' | Stadium: City Stadium; Attendance: 5,252; Referee: Adam Brzozowiec |

| May 27, 2023 10 | Tormenta FC | 1–1 | Richmond Kickers | Statesboro, Georgia |
| 7:30 p.m. | Knutson (yellow card) 34'; Otieno (yellow card) 42'; Akoto 45', (yellow card) 90+5'; Cameron (yellow card) 90+6' | Report | Terzaghi (yellow card) 10'; Cole (yellow card) 32'; Sukow 57'; Morán (yellow card) 60' (yellow-red card) 82' | Stadium: Optim Sports Medicine Field; Attendance: 1,104; Referee: Aleksandar Zhelyazkov |

| June 3, 2023 11 | Richmond Kickers | 1–0 | Chattanooga Red Wolves SC | Richmond, Virginia |
| 7:00 p.m. | Terzaghi 14', (yellow card) 77' | Report | Kraft (yellow card) 15'; Jérez (yellow card) 16'; Rentería (yellow card) 80' | Stadium: City Stadium; Attendance: 5,276; Referee: Gabriele Ciampi |

| June 7, 2023 12 | Northern Colorado Hailstorm FC | 2–0 | Richmond Kickers | Windsor, Colorado |
| 9:00 p.m. | Sabella 14'; Amann (yellow card) 17', (goal) 84'; Rendón (yellow card) 37' | Report | Sukow (yellow card) 37' | Stadium: Future Legends Complex; Referee: Velimir Stefanovic |

| June 10, 2023 13 | Central Valley Fuego FC | 1–2 | Richmond Kickers | Fresno, California |
| 10:00 p.m. | Carrera-García 41'; Ramos (yellow card) 52'; Forbes (red card) 79' | Report | Aune (yellow card) 22'; Fitch (yellow card) 43'; Terzaghi 52' (pen.), 71' | Stadium: Fresno State Soccer Stadium; Attendance: 810; Referee: Turan Ozdemir |

| June 17, 2023 14 | Richmond Kickers | 0–1 | Forward Madison FC | Richmond, Virginia |
| 7:00 p.m. | Gordon (yellow card) 77'; Mecham (yellow card) 90+4' | Report | Onen (yellow card) 69'; Payne 78' | Stadium: City Stadium; Attendance: 4,902; Referee: Donovan Eubank |

| June 24, 2023 15 | Richmond Kickers | 2–2 | One Knoxville SC | Richmond, Virginia |
| 7:00 p.m. | Terzaghi 7', 75' (pen.); Aune (yellow card) 40' | Report | Ross (yellow card) 14'; Crisler (yellow card) 20'; Barnathan 69' (o.g.); Ilić 71'; Skelton (yellow card) 75' | Stadium: City Stadium; Attendance: 3,863; Referee: Madzid Coric |

| July 1, 2023 16 | Richmond Kickers | 2–0 | Chattanooga Red Wolves SC | Richmond, Virginia |
| 7:00 p.m. | Terzaghi 49' (pen.); Vinyals 69' (pen.) | Report | Hernández (yellow card) 51'; Liborio Jr. (yellow card) 68'; Nicklaw (yellow card) 87' | Stadium: City Stadium; Attendance: 5,858; Referee: Edgar Garcia |

| July 8, 2023 17 | Union Omaha | 4–1 | Richmond Kickers | Papillion, Nebraska |
| 8:00 p.m. | Scearce 24'; Meza (yellow card) 31', (goal) 49'; Gallardo (red card) 41'; Dos Santos 68', 79'; Willis (red card) 71' | Report | Vinyals (yellow card) 26'; Terzaghi 39' (pen.), (yellow card) 41'; Sukow (yellow card) 66'; Morán (yellow card) 73'; Aune (yellow card) 86' | Stadium: Werner Park; Attendance: 3,524; Referee: Kevin Fikar |

| July 15, 2023 18 | Richmond Kickers | 2–2 | Charlotte Independence | Richmond, Virginia |
| 7:00 p.m. | Sierakowski 8'; Terzaghi 61', (yellow card) 65' | Report | Johnson 11'; Dutey (yellow card) 39'; Mbuyu 85'; Álvarez (yellow card) 90+1' | Stadium: City Stadium; Attendance: 4,951; Referee: Olvin Oliva |

| July 22, 2023 19 | Northern Colorado Hailstorm FC | 3–1 | Richmond Kickers | Windsor, Colorado |
| 9:00 p.m. | Opara (yellow card) 22', (goal) 50'; Hernández 72'; Folla (yellow card) 80'; King 83' | Report | Morán (yellow card) 1'; Folla 17' (o.g.); Sukow (yellow card) 52' | Stadium: Future Legends Complex; Attendance: 1,511; Referee: Turan Ozdemir |

| July 29, 2023 20 | Lexington SC | 2–2 | Richmond Kickers | Georgetown, Kentucky |
| 7:00 p.m. | Smart 10' (pen.), (yellow card) 63'; Machell (yellow card) 16'; Dlamini (yellow card) 45+2'; Fitch 68' (o.g.); Diouf (yellow card) 88' | Report | Fitzgerald (yellow card) 9'; Vinyals 7', 16', (yellow card) 90+3'; Fitch (yellow card) 23'; Morán (yellow card) 26'; Aune (yellow card) 88' | Stadium: Toyota Stadium; Attendance: 2,105; Referee: Drew Klemp |

| August 5, 2023 21 | Richmond Kickers | 1–2 | Forward Madison FC | Richmond, Virginia |
| 7:00 p.m. | Barnathan 87' (pen.) | Report | Bartman 35'; Onen 74'; Crull (yellow card) 90+7' | Stadium: City Stadium; Attendance: 4,336; Referee: Cristian Campo |

| August 9, 2023 22 | Richmond Kickers | 2–2 | North Carolina FC | Richmond, Virginia |
| 7:00 p.m. | Terzaghi 33'; Barnathan (yellow card) 75'; Hornsby 90+6' | Report | Perez (yellow card) 18'; Garcia (yellow card) 28'; McLaughlin 36', (yellow card) 44'; Somersall (yellow card) 45+2'; Hornsby 60' (o.g.); Popp (yellow card) 89' | Stadium: City Stadium; Attendance: 3,143; Referee: Gary Gutierrez |

| August 12, 2023 23 | Chattanooga Red Wolves SC | 3–2 | Richmond Kickers | East Ridge, Tennessee |
| 7:30 p.m. | Mensah (yellow card) 45+1', (goal) 56'; Kraft (yellow card) 65'; Rentería 72'; Marsh 78', (yellow card) 80' | Report | João Silva (yellow card) 28'; Bentley 43'; Sierakowski 48'; Hornsby (yellow card) 71' | Stadium: CHI Memorial Stadium; Attendance: 2,433; Referee: Alejo Calume |

| August 19, 2023 24 | Richmond Kickers | 1–3 | North Carolina FC | Richmond, Virginia |
| 7:00 p.m. | João Silva (yellow card) 62'; Morán (yellow card) 72'; Fitch 86' | Report | Anderson 16', 53'; Garcia (yellow card) 22'; Blanco (yellow card) 30'; Servania (yellow card) 61'; Maldonado 81'; Arriaga (yellow card) 90+6' | Stadium: City Stadium; Attendance: 5,570; Referee: Gabriele Ciampi |

| August 26, 2023 25 | Lexington SC | 1–0 | Richmond Kickers | Georgetown, Kentucky |
| 7:00 p.m. | Mohammed (yellow card) 15'; Diouf 83' (pen.); Balogun (yellow card) 89'; Seo-In Kim (yellow card) 90+5' | Report | Barnathan (yellow card) 34' (yellow-red card) 81'; O'Dwyer (yellow card) 70' | Stadium: Toyota Stadium; Attendance: 2,145; Referee: Richonne Clark |

| August 30, 2023 26 | Richmond Kickers | 3–3 | Central Valley Fuego FC | Richmond, Virginia |
| 7:00 p.m. | Morán (yellow card) 9'; João Silva 43'; O'Dwyer 54'; Sierakowski (yellow card) 58'; Simmonds 84' | Report | Cerritos 60' (pen.); Forbes 61'; Dulysse 76'; Lemus (yellow card) 90' | Stadium: City Stadium; Attendance: 3,479; Referee: Gabriele Giusti |

| September 9, 2023 27 | Union Omaha | 2–1 | Richmond Kickers | Papillion, Nebraska |
| 8:00 p.m. | Dos Santos (yellow card) 21'; Dolabella 58', (yellow card) 90+4'; Gil 82' | Report | Morán (yellow card) 40'; João Silva (yellow card) 45+3'; Scearce 90+2' (o.g.) | Stadium: Werner Park; Attendance: 4,046; Referee: Velimir Stefanovic |

| September 14, 2023 28 | Forward Madison FC | 2–0 | Richmond Kickers | Madison, Wisconsin |
| 8:00 p.m. | Gebhard 3'; Osmond (yellow card) 44'; Mesias 46'; da Silva (yellow card) 49' | Report | Vinyals (yellow card) 12'; Cole (yellow card) 18'; Johnson (yellow card) 66'; Morán (yellow card) 79'; Aune (yellow card) 84' | Stadium: Breese Stevens Field; Attendance: 3,878; Referee: Olvin Oliva |

| September 24, 2023 29 | Richmond Kickers | 1–2 | Greenville Triumph SC | Richmond, Virginia |
| 6:00 p.m. | Aune (yellow card) 16'; Vinyals (yellow card) 22'; Sierakowski 45+3'; Howell (yellow card) 65'; Cox (yellow card) 85' | Report | Franke (yellow card) 39'; Gavilanes 45'; Castro 54'; Boyce (yellow card) 90+7' | Stadium: City Stadium; Attendance: 3,470; Referee: Gary Gutierrez |

| September 30, 2023 30 | Richmond Kickers | 0–1 | Tormenta FC | Richmond, Virginia |
| 6:00 p.m. | Morán (yellow card) 3'; Sierakowski (yellow card) 69'; Vanacore-Decker (yellow card) 77'; Simmonds (yellow card) 85' | Report | Khoury (yellow card) 14'; Akoto (yellow card) 29'; Cameron (yellow card) 45'; Sterling 70' (pen.) | Stadium: City Stadium; Attendance: 6,000; Referee: Richonne Clark |

| October 6, 2023 31 | One Knoxville SC | 2–2 | Richmond Kickers | Knoxville, Tennessee |
| 7:30 p.m. | Bentley 4' (o.g.); Ilić 38'; McDowell (yellow card) 45+1'; Skelton (yellow card) 68'; van der Pluijm (yellow card) 71'; Crisler (yellow card) 89' | Report | Vinyals 32' (pen.), 86'; O'Dwyer (yellow card) 35'; Aune (yellow card) 37' | Stadium: Regal Stadium; Attendance: 1,925; Referee: Cristian Campo |

| October 14, 2023 32 | Richmond Kickers | 4–5 | Central Valley Fuego FC | Richmond, Virginia |
| 6:00 p.m. | O'Dwyer 9'; Fitch 26'; Bentley (yellow card) 28'; Vinyals 45' (pen.); Vasquez 84' (o.g.) | Report | Dieye 33', 46', (yellow card) 64'; Sukow 42' (o.g.); Hanson 70'; Falck 86' | Stadium: City Stadium; Attendance: 4,035; Referee: Amin Hadzic |

=== U.S. Open Cup ===
| April 6, 2023 Second round | Richmond Kickers (Virginia) | 3–2 | (Ohio) Cleveland SC | Richmond, Virginia |
| 7:00 p.m. | Barnathan (yellow card) 11' (goal) 79'; Terzaghi 31', 59'; Gomiero (yellow card) 34'; Fitch (yellow card) 55' | Report | Beck 80'; Harter 86' | Stadium: City Stadium; Attendance: 1,013; Referee: Christian Centeno |

| April 26, 2023 Third round | D.C. United (Washington, D.C.) | 1–0 | (Virginia) Richmond Kickers | Washington, D.C. |
| 7:30 p.m. | Asad 52' (pen.) | Report | | Stadium: Audi Field; Attendance: 8,686; Referee: John Griggs |

== Statistics ==
=== Appearances and goals ===
As of October 14, 2023. Numbers after plus–sign (+) denote appearances as a substitute.

| No. | Pos | Nat | Player | Total | | USL1 | | USL1 Playoffs | | U.S. Open Cup | |
| No. | Pos | Nat | Player | Apps | Goals | Apps | Goals | Apps | Goals | Apps | Goals |
|---|---|---|---|---|---|---|---|---|---|---|---|
| 1 | GK | (Japan) JPN | Akira Fitzgerald | 22 | 0 | 22+0 | 0 | 0+0 | 0 | 0+0 | 0 |
| 2 | DF | (United States) USA | Dakota Barnathan | 23 | 2 | 21+1 | 1 | 0+0 | 0 | 1+0 | 1 |
| 3 | DF | (United States) USA | Chris Cole | 15 | 0 | 8+7 | 0 | 0+0 | 0 | 0+0 | 0 |
| 4 | DF | (United States) USA | Simon Fitch | 32 | 2 | 32+0 | 2 | 0+0 | 0 | 0+0 | 0 |
| 6 | MF | (Argentina) ARG | Zacarías Morán | 31 | 0 | 30+0 | 0 | 0+0 | 0 | 1+0 | 0 |
| 7 | FW | (United States) USA | Ethan Vanacore-Decker | 3 | 0 | 0+3 | 0 | 0+0 | 0 | 0+0 | 0 |
| 8 | FW | (Brazil) BRA | João Gomiero | 28 | 4 | 21+6 | 4 | 0+0 | 0 | 1+0 | 0 |
| 9 | FW | (England) ENG | Matt Bentley | 30 | 1 | 17+12 | 1 | 0+0 | 0 | 1+0 | 0 |
| 10 | MF | (Spain) ESP | Nil Vinyals | 28 | 6 | 26+1 | 6 | 0+0 | 0 | 1+0 | 0 |
| 11 | FW | (United States) USA | David Olsen | 5 | 0 | 0+5 | 0 | 0+0 | 0 | 0+0 | 0 |
| 14 | DF | (United States) USA | Luke Pavone | 13 | 1 | 2+10 | 1 | 0+0 | 0 | 1+0 | 0 |
| 16 | DF | (United States) USA | Jake Mecham | 22 | 0 | 4+17 | 0 | 0+0 | 0 | 1+0 | 0 |
| 17 | FW | (United States) USA | Ryan Sierakowski | 21 | 4 | 16+5 | 4 | 0+0 | 0 | 0+0 | 0 |
| 19 | FW | (United States) USA | Justin Sukow | 31 | 2 | 26+4 | 2 | 0+0 | 0 | 0+1 | 0 |
| 24 | DF | (United States) USA | Nathan Aune | 32 | 2 | 31+0 | 2 | 0+0 | 0 | 1+0 | 0 |
| 25 | DF | (Germany) GER | Michael Hornsby | 28 | 1 | 28+0 | 1 | 0+0 | 0 | 0+0 | 0 |
| 27 | MF | (England) ENG | Chandler O'Dwyer | 24 | 2 | 10+14 | 2 | 0+0 | 0 | 0+0 | 0 |
| 29 | GK | (United States) USA | Will Palmquist | 12 | 0 | 10+1 | 0 | 0+0 | 0 | 1+0 | 0 |
| 30 | GK | (United States) USA | Eli Mumford | 0 | 0 | 0+0 | 0 | 0+0 | 0 | 0+0 | 0 |
| 31 | DF | (United States) USA | Otavio Zerbini | 0 | 0 | 0+0 | 0 | 0+0 | 0 | 0+0 | 0 |
| 32 | FW | (Argentina) ARG | Emiliano Terzaghi | 24 | 12 | 23+0 | 10 | 0+0 | 0 | 1+0 | 2 |
| 33 | MF | (United States) USA | Gabe Cox | 6 | 0 | 0+6 | 0 | 0+0 | 0 | 0+0 | 0 |
| 34 | DF | (United States) USA | Beckett Howell | 13 | 0 | 4+8 | 0 | 0+0 | 0 | 0+1 | 0 |
| 36 | MF | (United States) USA | Landon Johnson | 11 | 0 | 3+8 | 0 | 0+0 | 0 | 0+0 | 0 |
| 37 | MF | (Jamaica) JAM | Nicholas Simmonds | 7 | 1 | 0+7 | 1 | 0+0 | 0 | 0+0 | 0 |
| 91 | FW | (Jamaica) JAM | Owayne Gordon | 19 | 1 | 4+15 | 1 | 0+0 | 0 | 0+0 | 0 |
| 99 | FW | (Grenada) GRN | Kharlton Belmar | 21 | 2 | 17+4 | 2 | 0+0 | 0 | 0+0 | 0 |
