= 2023 USL League One season =

USL League One
- Season: 2023
- Dates: March 17 – October 14 (regular season); October 20 – November 5 (playoffs)
- Champions: North Carolina FC (1st Title)
- Players' Shield: Union Omaha (2nd Title)
- Matches: 192
- Goals: 572 (2.98 per match)
- Best player: (United States) Trevor Amann Northern Colorado Hailstorm
- Top goalscorer: (United States) Trevor Amann Northern Colorado Hailstorm (23 Goals) (league record)
- Best goalkeeper: (United States) Austin Pack Charlotte Independence
- Highest scoring: 9 goals: RIC 4–5 CV (October 14)
- Longest winning run: 10 matches OMA
- Longest unbeaten run: 14 matches OMA
- Longest winless run: 16 matches RIC
- Longest losing run: 5 matches CV
- Total attendance: 451,425
- Average attendance: 2,363
- All statistics correct as of October 14, 2023.

The 2023 USL League One season was the fifth season of USL League One.

Twelve teams participated in the 2023 season. Each team played ten teams three times and the one remaining team twice for a total of 32 games. Top six teams qualified for the playoffs. Lexington SC entered as an expansion team and One Knoxville SC joined from USL League Two. FC Tucson left to rejoin USL League Two.

Tormenta FC are the defending champions, having defeated Chattanooga Red Wolves in the 2022 final.

== Teams ==
Locations of teams for the 2023 USL League One season

Club	City	Stadium	Capacity	Head coach	Jersey manufacturer	Jersey sponsor
Central Valley Fuego FC	Fresno, California	Fresno State Soccer Stadium	1,000	Edison Gonzalez (interim)	Capelli Sport	El Mexicano
Charlotte Independence	Charlotte, North Carolina	American Legion Memorial Stadium	10,500	Mike Jeffries	Capelli Sport	Novant Health
Chattanooga Red Wolves SC	Chattanooga, Tennessee	CHI Memorial Stadium	5,000	Scott Mackenzie	Adidas	Transcard
Forward Madison FC	Madison, Wisconsin	Breese Stevens Field	5,000	Matt Glaeser	Hummel	Dairyland Insurance
Greenville Triumph SC	Greenville, South Carolina	Paladin Stadium	16,000	John Harkes	Hummel	Scansource
One Knoxville SC	Knoxville, Tennessee	Regal Stadium	3,000	Mark McKeever	Hummel	KUB Fiber
Lexington SC	Lexington, Kentucky	Toyota Stadium	5,000	Nacho Novo (interim)	Nike	UK HealthCare
North Carolina FC	Cary, North Carolina	WakeMed Soccer Park	10,000	John Bradford	Adidas	WakeMed
Northern Colorado Hailstorm FC	Windsor, Colorado	TicketSmarter Stadium at Future Legends Complex	6,000	Éamon Zayed	Puma	New Belgium Brewing Company
Richmond Kickers	Richmond, Virginia	City Stadium	6,000 (Kickers matches)	Darren Sawatzky	Adidas	Ukrop's
South Georgia Tormenta FC	Statesboro, Georgia	Tormenta Stadium	5,300	Ian Cameron	Adidas	Optim Healthcare
Union Omaha	Papillion, Nebraska	Werner Park	9,023	Dominic Casciato	Hummel	XCancer

=== Managerial changes ===
Team	Outgoing manager	Manner of departure	Date of vacancy	Incoming manager	Date of appointment
Chattanooga Red Wolves SC	(United States) Jimmy Obleda	Sacked	November 8, 2022	(United States) Jeff Korytoski	December 14, 2022
Union Omaha	(United States) Jay Mims	Resigned	December 16, 2022	(England) Dominic Casciato	January 17, 2023
Chattanooga Red Wolves SC	(United States) Jeff Korytoski	Sacked	June 20, 2023	(United States) Jimmy Weekley (interim)	June 20, 2023
Central Valley Fuego FC	(Mexico) Martin Vasquez	Sacked	July 3, 2023	(England) Adam Smith (interim)	July 3, 2023
Chattanooga Red Wolves SC	(United States) Jimmy Weekley (interim)	Medical leave	August 4, 2023	(England) Scott Mackenzie (interim)	August 4, 2023
Central Valley Fuego FC	(England) Adam Smith (interim)	Moved to front office	August 30, 2023	(United States) Edison Gonzalez (interim)	August 30, 2023
Lexington SC	(England) Sam Stockley	Moved to front office	September 17, 2023	(Spain) Nacho Novo (interim)	September 17, 2023
Chattanooga Red Wolves SC	(England) Scott Mackenzie (interim)	End of interim period	October 5, 2023	(England) Scott Mackenzie	October 5, 2023

== League table ==
Pos	Team	Pld	W	L	T	GF	GA	GD	Pts	Qualification
1	Union Omaha (S)	32	19	5	8	61	41	+20	65	Qualification for the semi-finals
2	North Carolina FC (C)	32	19	7	6	58	39	+19	63	Qualification for the semi-finals
3	Northern Colorado Hailstorm FC	32	18	6	8	59	37	+22	62	Qualification for the play-offs
4	Charlotte Independence	32	13	9	10	50	42	+8	49	Qualification for the play-offs
5	Greenville Triumph SC	32	13	10	9	45	40	+5	48	Qualification for the play-offs
6	Forward Madison FC	32	11	11	10	38	40	−2	43	Qualification for the play-offs
7	Tormenta FC	32	12	14	6	55	56	−1	42	
8	One Knoxville SC	32	9	12	11	36	39	−3	38	
9	Lexington SC	32	7	14	11	46	57	−11	32	
10	Chattanooga Red Wolves SC	32	8	17	7	46	65	−19	31	
11	Richmond Kickers	32	6	15	11	42	55	−13	29	
12	Central Valley Fuego FC	32	6	21	5	36	61	−25	23	

Source: USL League One
Rules for classification: 1) points; 2) total wins; 3) total goal differential; 4) total goals scored; 5) points earned against top four Conference finishers; 6) disciplinary points; 7) drawing of lots.
(C) Champions; (S) Players' Shield winner

== Results table ==
Color key: Home • Away • Win • Loss • Draw
Club	Matches																															
Club	1	2	3	4	5	6	7	8	9	10	11	12	13	14	15	16	17	18	19	20	21	22	23	24	25	26	27	28	29	30	31	32
CV Fuego FC (CV)	CHA	OMA	KNX	GVL	CLT	KNX	NCA	TRM	NCO	MAD	RIC	GVL	NCO	OMA	MAD	LEX	CLT	KNX	CHA	TRM	LEX	CLT	MAD	RIC	NCA	LEX	NCO	NCA	OMA	CHA	GVL	RIC
CV Fuego FC (CV)	1–0	0–2	1–1	0–3	0–1	0–1	0–2	3–2	1–4	2–1	1–2	0–1	0–1	0–1	0–1	2–1	2–1	0–1	1–1	1–2	2–3	1–2	4–4	3–3	1–2	2–2	0–2	0–3	1–2	1–3	1–2	5–4
Charlotte Independence (CLT)	RIC	TRM	RIC	NCA	OMA	CV	MAD	GVL	LEX	NCA	CHA	OMA	KNX	CHA	NCA	NCO	LEX	RIC	GVL	CV	NCO	GVL	TRM	CV	KNX	NCO	CHA	LEX	MAD	KNX	OMA	TRM
Charlotte Independence (CLT)	0–0	3–1	2–1	1–1	0–0	1–0	0–0	1–3	0–1	2–1	3–0	3–0	0–2	2–2	0–2	2–3	2–1	2–2	1–0	1–2	4–1	2–3	3–2	2–1	1–1	2–4	3–0	2–2	2–0	1–1	1–4	1–1
Chattanooga Red Wolves (CHA)	NCO	CV	KNX	NCA	LEX	TRM	KNX	OMA	CLT	RIC	MAD	LEX	GVL	CLT	RIC	NCO	TRM	KNX	NCA	CV	MAD	RIC	OMA	GVL	TRM	MAD	CLT	OMA	LEX	CV	GVL	NCO
Chattanooga Red Wolves (CHA)	0–0	0–1	2–1	0–3	3–1	0–2	0–2	3–3	0–3	0–1	2–0	0–2	1–5	2–2	0–2	1–1	2–4	3–2	1–2	1–1	0–1	3–2	1–2	1–2	4–4	3–1	0–3	2–3	5–3	3–1	2–2	1–3
Forward Madison FC (MAD)	OMA	LEX	GVL	CLT	KNX	NCA	NCO	OMA	CV	CHA	NCA	RIC	LEX	TRM	GVL	CV	NCA	TRM	GVL	RIC	CHA	KNX	TRM	CV	CHA	KNX	RIC	NCO	CLT	LEX	NCO	OMA
Forward Madison FC (MAD)	1–1	0–0	4–1	0–0	0–0	2–0	0–2	2–1	1–2	0–2	3–0	1–0	3–2	1–0	0–1	1–0	2–2	1–4	1–1	2–1	1–0	1–2	2–4	4–4	1–3	0–0	2–0	0–0	0–2	2–2	0–2	0–1
Greenville Triumph SC (GVL)	RIC	TRM	MAD	CV	LEX	NCA	CLT	RIC	KNX	OMA	TRM	OMA	CV	CHA	MAD	KNX	CLT	TRM	MAD	CLT	NCA	NCO	CHA	OMA	LEX	NCA	KNX	RIC	NCO	CV	CHA	LEX
Greenville Triumph SC (GVL)	0–1	0–2	1–4	3–0	2–0	1–2	3–1	2–2	1–2	3–3	1–1	1–1	1–0	5–1	1–0	1–0	0–1	2–1	1–1	3–2	1–2	0–0	2–1	1–2	1–1	0–2	1–0	2–1	0–2	2–1	2–2	1–1
One Knoxville SC (KNX)	LEX	CHA	CV	TRM	CV	MAD	NCO	CHA	GVL	LEX	NCA	NCO	CLT	OMA	RIC	NCA	NCO	GVL	OMA	CHA	CV	OMA	MAD	LEX	CLT	TRM	MAD	GVL	TRM	CLT	RIC	NCA
One Knoxville SC (KNX)	2–1	1–2	1–1	0–2	1–0	0–0	1–2	2–0	2–1	1–1	0–1	0–0	2–0	1–1	2–2	2–2	2–4	0–1	1–2	2–3	1–0	1–3	2–1	1–0	1–1	3–1	0–0	0–1	0–1	1–1	2–2	1–2
Lexington SC (LEX)	KNX	NCA	MAD	TRM	GVL	CHA	CLT	RIC	KNX	NCO	TRM	CHA	NCA	MAD	TRM	CLT	CV	OMA	RIC	OMA	NCO	CV	KNX	RIC	GVL	NCO	CV	CLT	CHA	MAD	NCA	GVL
Lexington SC (LEX)	1–2	1–2	0–0	2–1	0–2	1–3	1–0	1–2	1–1	2–2	1–1	2–0	2–2	2–3	1–5	1–2	1–2	3–0	2–2	0–2	4–3	3–2	0–1	1–0	1–1	2–3	2–2	2–2	3–5	2–2	0–1	1–1
North Carolina FC (NCA)	TRM	LEX	CLT	OMA	CHA	GVL	CV	MAD	RIC	CLT	KNX	MAD	LEX	CLT	KNX	MAD	NCO	CHA	TRM	RIC	GVL	RIC	NCO	CV	OMA	GVL	TRM	CV	NCO	OMA	LEX	KNX
North Carolina FC (NCA)	0–1	2–1	1–1	2–1	3–0	2–1	2–0	0–2	3–2	1–2	1–0	0–3	2–2	2–0	2–2	2–2	2–0	2–1	3–2	2–2	2–1	3–1	1–2	2–1	3–4	2–0	2–3	3–0	2–0	1–1	1–0	2–1
NoCo Hailstorm FC (NCO)	CHA	TRM	RIC	OMA	KNX	MAD	CV	LEX	RIC	KNX	CV	CLT	CHA	KNX	OMA	RIC	NCA	CLT	LEX	OMA	GVL	TRM	NCA	CLT	LEX	TRM	CV	MAD	NCA	GVL	MAD	CHA
NoCo Hailstorm FC (NCO)	0–0	3–0	0–0	2–3	2–1	2–0	4–1	2–2	2–0	0–0	1–0	3–2	1–1	4–2	2–0	3–1	0–2	1–4	3–4	2–3	0–0	2–2	2–1	4–2	3–2	2–1	2–0	0–0	0–2	2–0	2–0	3–1
Richmond Kickers (RIC)	CLT	GVL	CLT	NCO	TRM	OMA	GVL	NCA	LEX	TRM	CHA	NCO	CV	MAD	KNX	CHA	OMA	CLT	NCO	LEX	MAD	NCA	CHA	NCA	LEX	CV	OMA	MAD	GVL	TRM	KNX	CV
Richmond Kickers (RIC)	0–0	1–0	1–2	0–0	3–1	0–0	2–2	2–3	2–1	1–1	1–0	0–2	2–1	0–1	2–2	2–0	1–4	2–2	1–3	2–2	1–2	2–2	2–3	1–3	0–1	3–3	1–2	0–2	1–2	0–1	2–2	4–5
Tormenta FC (TRM)	NCA	CLT	NCO	GVL	LEX	KNX	RIC	CHA	CV	RIC	GVL	LEX	OMA	MAD	LEX	CHA	GVL	MAD	OMA	NCA	CV	CLT	MAD	NCO	CHA	KNX	NCO	NCA	KNX	RIC	OMA	CLT
Tormenta FC (TRM)	1–0	1–3	0–3	2–0	1–2	2–0	1–3	2–0	2–3	1–1	1–1	1–1	0–2	0–1	5–1	4–2	1–2	4–1	2–3	2–3	2–1	2–3	4–2	2–2	4–4	1–3	1–2	3–2	1–0	1–0	0–4	1–1
Union Omaha (OMA)	MAD	CV	NCA	CLT	NCO	RIC	CHA	GVL	MAD	CLT	GVL	KNX	TRM	CV	RIC	NCO	KNX	LEX	TRM	LEX	KNX	NCO	CHA	GVL	NCA	RIC	CHA	CV	NCA	CLT	TRM	MAD
Union Omaha (OMA)	1–1	2–0	1–2	0–0	3–2	0–0	3–3	3–3	1–2	0–3	1–1	1–1	2–0	1–0	4–1	0–2	2–1	0–3	3–2	2–0	3–1	3–2	2–1	2–1	4–3	2–1	3–2	2–1	1–1	4–1	4–0	1–0

== Playoffs ==
The 2023 USL League One Playoffs (branded as the 2023 USL League One Playoffs presented by Hisense USA for sponsorship reasons) was the post-season championship of the USL League One season.

=== Bracket ===
Quarter-finals
4	Charlotte Independence	3
5	Greenville Triumph SC	2
3	Northern Colorado Hailstorm	4
6	Forward Madison FC	1

Semi-finals
1	Union Omaha	0 (4)
4	Charlotte Independence (p)	0 (5)
2	North Carolina FC	3
3	Northern Colorado Hailstorm	1

Final
4	Charlotte Independence	1 (4)
2	North Carolina FC (p)	1 (5)

=== Schedule ===
==== Quarter-finals ====
October 20, 2023	Charlotte Independence	3–2	Greenville Triumph SC	Charlotte, North Carolina
7:00 PM EDT	Johnson 51' (yellow card) 90+5'; Obertan 74'; Flanagan 79'	Report	Gavilanes 13'; Coutinho (yellow card) 36'; Lee (yellow card) 61'; Pilato (yellow card) 73'; Walker (yellow card) 86'; Shultz 90+2'	Stadium: American Legion Memorial Stadium; Attendance: 961; Referee: Thomas Snyder

October 21, 2023	Northern Colorado Hailstorm	4–1	Forward Madison FC	Windsor, Colorado
7:00 PM MDT	Hernández (yellow card) 43'; Amann 45', 87', 90+5'; Rendón (yellow card) 45+4'; Rogers 65'	Report	Martinez (yellow card) 38'; Schipmann (yellow card) 45+1'; Chaney 57'; Mehl (yellow card) 90+7'	Stadium: TicketSmarter Stadium; Attendance: 3,011; Referee: Joshua Encarnación

==== Semi-finals ====
October 28, 2023	Union Omaha	0–0 (a.e.t.) (4–5 p)	Charlotte Independence	Papillion, Nebraska
4:30 PM CDT	Scearce (yellow card) 30'; Gallardo (yellow card) 90'; Souahy (yellow card) 102'	Report	Spielman (yellow card) 21'; Obertan (yellow card) 90'; Dunwell (yellow card) 104'	Stadium: Werner Park; Attendance: 2,217; Referee: Eric Tattersall
	Penalties
	Scearce (penalty scored); Dos Santos (penalty missed); Gallardo (penalty scored); Brito (penalty scored); Willis (penalty scored)		(penalty scored) Johnson; (penalty scored) Acosta; (penalty scored) Bennett; (penalty scored) Álvarez; (penalty scored) Spielman

October 28, 2023	North Carolina FC	3–1	Northern Colorado Hailstorm	Cary, North Carolina
7:30 PM EDT	Blanco (yellow card) 15'; Garcia 31', 49'; Perez (yellow card) 85' (goal) 87'	Report	Folla (yellow card) 22'; Rendón (yellow card) 56'; Hernández 90+4'	Stadium: WakeMed Soccer Park; Attendance: 2,345; Referee: Alexis Da Silva

==== USL League One Final ====
November 5, 2023	North Carolina FC	1–1 (a.e.t.) (5–4 p)	Charlotte Independence	Cary, North Carolina
5:00 PM EST	Perez (yellow card) 86'; Ntalu (yellow card) 108'; Pack 111' (o.g.)	Report	Flanagan (yellow card) 71'; Mbuyu (yellow card) 88'; Acosta 99'	Stadium: WakeMed Soccer Park; Attendance: 4,487; Referee: Sergii Demianchuk
	Penalties
	Perez (penalty scored); Servania (penalty scored); Navarro (penalty scored); Maldonado (penalty scored); Arriaga (penalty scored)		(penalty scored) Kelly; (penalty missed) Johnson; (penalty scored) Acosta; (penalty scored) Álvarez; (penalty scored) Spielman

Championship Game MVP: (Saint Kitts and Nevis) Raheem Somersall (NCA)

== Attendance ==
=== Average home attendances ===
Ranked from highest to lowest average attendance.

Team	GP	Total	High	Low	Average
Richmond Kickers	16	76,577	6,000	3,143	4,786
Forward Madison FC	16	68,963	5,000	3,223	4,310
Union Omaha	16	48,487	4,095	1,665	3,030
Chattanooga Red Wolves SC	16	38,578	3,059	1,863	2,411
North Carolina FC	16	38,228	5,795	1,119	2,389
Lexington SC	16	35,717	3,029	1,911	2,232
Greenville Triumph SC	16	33,468	3,672	1,089	2,092
One Knoxville SC	16*	29,743	2,522	1,212	1,983
Charlotte Independence	16	25,617	3,947	107	1,601
Northern Colorado Hailstorm FC	16	23,133	2,392	457	1,446
South Georgia Tormenta FC	16	21,152	2,041	1,001	1,322
Central Valley Fuego FC	16	11,762	1,436	370	735
Total	192	451,425	6,000	107	2,363

Sources: USL
Note= One Knoxville SC had one game not reported.

== Regular season statistical leaders ==
As of October 14, 2023

=== Top scorers ===
Rank	Player	Club	Goals
1	(United States) Trevor Amann	Northern Colorado Hailstorm	23
2	(Saint Vincent and the Grenadines) Oalex Anderson	North Carolina FC	17
3	(Senegal) Ates Diouf	Lexington SC	15
4	(Colombia) Leonardo Castro	Greenville Triumph SC	13
4	(Cape Verde) Steevan Dos Santos	Union Omaha	13
4	(Brazil) Rafael Mentzingen	North Carolina FC	13
4	(England) Kazaiah Sterling	Tormenta FC	13
8	(Jamaica) Chevone Marsh	Chattanooga Red Wolves	12
8	(Ghana) Ropapa Mensah	Chattanooga Red Wolves	12
8	(United States) Noe Meza	Union Omaha	12

=== Hat tricks ===
Player	Club	Against	Result	Date
(Switzerland) Lyam MacKinnon	Greenville Triumph SC	Chattanooga Red Wolves	5–1 (H)	June 21
(Senegal) Ates Diouf	Lexington SC	Northern Colorado Hailstorm	3–4 (A)	August 5
(Cape Verde) Steevan Dos Santos	Union Omaha	Charlotte Independence	4–1 (H)	October 4
(United States) Trevor Amann	Northern Colorado Hailstorm FC	Forward Madison FC	4–1 (H)	October 21

Notes

(H) – Home team
(A) – Away team

Scored four goals.
USL League One playoffs.

=== Top assists ===
Rank	Player	Club	Assists
1	(England) Arthur Rogers	Northern Colorado Hailstorm	11
2	(United States) Luis Gil	Union Omaha	9
3	(United States) Allen Gavilanes	Greenville Triumph SC	8
3	(United States) Tate Robertson	Lexington SC	8
5	(United States) Miguel Ibarra	Charlotte Independence	7
5	(United States) Garrett McLaughlin	North Carolina FC	7
7	(Saint Vincent and the Grenadines) Oalex Anderson	North Carolina FC	6
7	(United States) Conor Doyle	Union Omaha	6
7	(United States) Jonathan Filipe	Chattanooga Red Wolves	6
7	(Brazil) Pedro Fonseca	Tormenta FC	6
7	(Lebanon) Jackson Khoury	Tormenta FC	6
7	(United States) Ryley Kraft	Chattanooga Red Wolves	6
7	(Uganda) Jayden Onen	Forward Madison FC	6
7	(United States) Derek Waldeck	One Knoxville SC	6

=== Clean sheets ===
Rank	Player	Club	Shutouts
1	(United States) Lalo Delgado	Northern Colorado Hailstorm	13
2	(Philippines) Bernd Schipmann	Forward Madison FC	12
3	(United States) Austin Pack	Charlotte Independence	9
4	(United States) Sean Lewis	One Knoxville SC	8
4	(Ghana) Rashid Nuhu	Union Omaha	8
6	(United States) Jared Mazzola	Greenville Triumph SC	6
7	(Jamaica) Amal Knight	Lexington SC	4
7	(Chile) Pablo Jara	Tormenta FC	4
7	(United States) Brooks Thompson	North Carolina FC	4
10	(Japan) Akira Fitzgerald	Richmond Kickers	3
10	(United States) Nick Holliday	North Carolina FC	3
10	(United States) Will Palmquist	Richmond Kickers	3

== League awards ==
=== Individual awards ===
Award	Winner	Team	Reason	Ref.
Golden Boot	(United States) Trevor Amann	Northern Colorado Hailstorm	League record 23 goals in 32 games	
Golden Glove	(United States) Sean Lewis	One Knoxville SC	8 shutouts; 1.04 goals against average; 85 saves	
Golden Playmaker	(England) Arthur Rogers	Northern Colorado Hailstorm	League record 11 assists	
Goalkeeper of the Year	(United States) Austin Pack	Charlotte Independence	League record 116 saves	
Defender of the Year	(England) Arthur Rogers	Northern Colorado Hailstorm	League record 11 assists	
Coach of the Year	(England) Dominic Casciato	Union Omaha	Won Players' Shield	
Young Player of the Year	(Lebanon) Jackson Khoury	Tormenta FC	7 goals; 6 assists	
Most Valuable Player	(United States) Trevor Amann	Northern Colorado Hailstorm	League record 23 goals; 7 braces	
Comeback Player of the Year	(United States) Irvin Parra	Northern Colorado Hailstorm	Battled cancer earlier in the season	
Save of the Year	(United States) Lalo Delgado	Northern Colorado Hailstorm	vs Tormenta FC	
Goal of the Year	(Sweden) Victor Falck	Central Valley Fuego FC	vs Lexington SC	

=== All-league teams ===
First team
Goalkeeper	Defenders	Midfielders	Forwards
(United States) Austin Pack (CLT) (Goalkeeper of the Year)	(England) Arthur Rogers (NCO) (Golden Playmaker and Defender of the Year) (England) Jordan Skelton (KNX) (Comoros) Alexis Souahy (OMA)	(United States) Mikey Maldonado (NCA) (Brazil) Rafael Mentzingen (NCA) (United States) John Scearce (OMA) (Spain) Nil Vinyals (RIC)	(United States) Trevor Amann (NCO) (Golden Boot and MVP) (Saint Vincent and the Grenadines) Oalex Anderson (NCA) (Senegal) Ates Diouf (LEX)

Second team
Goalkeeper	Defenders	Midfielders	Forwards
(United States) Sean Lewis (KNX) (Golden Glove)	(United States) Dion Acoff (OMA) (Austria) Jake Crull (MAD) (Cuba) Bruno Rendón (NCO)	(United States) Mukwelle Akale (TRM) (Senegal) Omar Ciss (CLT) (Liberia) Joel Johnson (CLT) (Honduras) Angelo Kelly-Rosales (KNX)	(Colombia) Leonardo Castro (GVL) (Cape Verde) Steevan Dos Santos (OMA) (United States) Noe Meza (OMA)

=== Monthly awards ===
Month	Player of the Month			Coach of the Month		References
Month	Player	Club	Position	Coach	Club	References
March	(Spain) Nil Vinyals	Richmond Kickers	Midfielder	(United States) Mike Jeffries	Charlotte Independence	
April	(Brazil) Rafael Mentzingen	North Carolina FC	Midfielder	(United States) John Bradford	North Carolina FC	
May	(United States) Trevor Amann	Northern Colorado Hailstorm	Forward	(Libya) Éamon Zayed	Northern Colorado Hailstorm	
June	(Argentina) Emiliano Terzaghi	Richmond Kickers	Forward	(United States) Matt Glaeser	Forward Madison FC	
July	(Saint Vincent and the Grenadines) Oalex Anderson	North Carolina FC	Forward	(United States) John Harkes	Greenville Triumph SC	
August	(Jamaica) Chevone Marsh	Chattanooga Red Wolves	Forward	(England) Dominic Casciato	Union Omaha	
September	(Senegal) Ates Diouf	Lexington SC	Forward	(Libya) Éamon Zayed	Northern Colorado Hailstorm	

=== Weekly awards ===
Player of the Week
Week	Player	Club	Position	Reason	Ref.
1	(United States) Jimmie Villalobos	One Knoxville SC	Midfielder	First goal in Knoxville history	
2	(Spain) Nil Vinyals	Richmond Kickers	Midfielder	Assist vs Greenville; 82% pass completion rate	
3	(Brazil) Rafael Mentzingen	North Carolina FC	Midfielder	1 goal; eight recoveries	
4	(Brazil) Pedro Fonseca	Tormenta FC	Midfielder	1 goal, 1 assist vs Greenville	
5	(England) Owen Green	Lexington SC	Defender	Game winning goal vs Tormenta FC	
6	(Brazil) Lucas Coutinho	Greenville Triumph SC	Midfielder	3 goals in 2 games	
7	(United States) Noe Meza	Union Omaha	Forward	2 goals vs Northern Colorado	
8	(Switzerland) Lyam MacKinnon	Greenville Triumph SC	Midfielder	2 goals vs Northern Colorado	
9	(Jamaica) Amal Knight	Lexington SC	Goalkeeper	6 saves vs Charlotte Independence	
10	(Brazil) João Gomiero	Richmond Kickers	Midfielder	3 goals in 2 games	
11	(United States) Noe Meza	Union Omaha	Forward	2 goals in 2 games	
12	(Senegal) Ates Diouf	Lexington SC	Forward	2 goals vs Northern Colorado	
13	(Argentina) Emiliano Terzaghi	Richmond Kickers	Forward	2 goals vs Central Valley Fuego	
14	(United States) Tate Robertson	Lexington SC	Defender	1 goals; 1 assist	
15	(Switzerland) Lyam MacKinnon	Greenville Triumph SC	Midfielder	4 goals vs Chattanooga	
16	(Saint Vincent and the Grenadines) Oalex Anderson	North Carolina FC	Forward	2 goals vs Charlotte	
17	(United States) Trevor Amann	Northern Colorado Hailstorm	Forward	3 goals in two games	
18	(England) Arthur Rogers	Northern Colorado Hailstorm	Defender	3 assists vs Knoxville	
19	(Colombia) Leonardo Castro	Greenville Triumph SC	Forward	2 goals vs Tormenta FC	
20	(England) Kazaiah Sterling	Tormenta FC	Forward	2 goals vs Madison; 1 assist vs Omaha	
21	(Senegal) Ates Diouf	Lexington SC	Forward	Hat trick vs Northern Colorado	
22	(Uganda) Jayden Onen	Forward Madison FC	Forward	1 assist each vs Chattanooga & Knoxville	
23	(England) Kazaiah Sterling	Tormenta FC	Forward	2 goals vs Madison	
24	(United States) Christian Chaney	Forward Madison FC	Forward	2 goals vs Central Valley Fuego	
25	(Trinidad and Tobago) Noah Powder	Northern Colorado Hailstorm	Midfielder	1 goal; 2 assists vs Charlotte	
26	(Brazil) Pedro Dolabella	Union Omaha	Midfielder	2 goals; 1 assist in two games	
27	(United States) Edward Delgado	Northern Colorado Hailstorm	Goalkeeper	6 save shutout vs Central Valley Fuego	
28	(United States) Jonathan Filipe	Chattanooga Red Wolves	Midfielder	1 goal; 2 assists vs Lexington	
29	(United States) Trevor Amann	Northern Colorado Hailstorm	Forward	2 goals vs Greenville	
30	(Cape Verde) Steevan Dos Santos	Union Omaha	Forward	Hat trick vs Charlotte; 4 goals in 2 games	
31	(Senegal) Cherif Dieye	Central Valley Fuego FC	Midfielder	2 goals vs Richmond	

Goal of the Week
Week	Player	Club	Opponent	Ref.
1	(United States) Mukwelle Akale	Tormenta FC	North Carolina FC	
2	(United States) Christian Chaney	Forward Madison FC	Union Omaha	
3	(El Salvador) Alexis Cerritos	Central Valley Fuego FC	Chattanooga Red Wolves SC	
4	(United States) Noe Meza	Union Omaha	Central Valley Fuego FC	
5	(United States) Christian Chaney	Forward Madison FC	Greenville Triumph SC	
6	(Brazil) Matheus Cassini	Tormenta FC	One Knoxville SC	
7	(United States) Noe Meza	Union Omaha	Northern Colorado Hailstorm	
8	(France) Louis Perez	North Carolina FC	Central Valley Fuego FC	
9	(United States) Isidro Martinez	Forward Madison FC	North Carolina FC	
10	(Norway) Sebastian Andreassen	One Knoxville SC	Greenville Triumph SC	
11	(Brazil) Pedro Dolabella	Union Omaha	Greenville Triumph SC	
12	(United States) Christian Chaney	Forward Madison FC	Central Valley Fuego FC	
13	(Austria) Jake Crull	Forward Madison FC	North Carolina FC	
14	(Scotland) Frank Ross	One Knoxville SC	Charlotte Independence	
15	(South Africa) Nazeem Bartman	Forward Madison FC	Lexington SC	
16	(South Africa) Nazeem Bartman	Forward Madison FC	Tormenta FC	
17	(United States) Noe Meza	Union Omaha	Richmond Kickers	
18	(United States) Maximus Ekk	Central Valley Fuego FC	Lexington SC	
19	(Democratic Republic of the Congo) Tresor Mbuyu	Charlotte Independence	Central Valley Fuego FC	
20	(Spain) Nil Vinyals	Richmond Kickers	Lexington SC	
21	(Jamaica) Chavany Willis	Union Omaha	One Knoxville SC	
22	(United States) Mukwelle Akale	Tormenta FC	Charlotte Independence	
23	(United States) Mikey Maldonado	North Carolina FC	Richmond Kickers	
24	(Uganda) Jayden Onen	Forward Madison FC	Central Valley Fuego FC	
25	(United States) Tate Robertson	Lexington SC	Greenville Triumph SC	
26	(United States) Luis Gil	Union Omaha	Richmond Kickers	
27	(United States) Mark Hernández	Northern Colorado Hailstorm	Central Valley Fuego FC	
28	(United States) Joe Gallardo	Union Omaha	Central Valley Fuego FC	
29	(United States) Luis Gil	Union Omaha	North Carolina FC	
30	(United States) Joe Brito	Union Omaha	Tormenta FC	
31	(Senegal) Cherif Dieye	Central Valley Fuego FC	Richmond Kickers	

Save of the Week
Week	Goalkeeper	Club	Opponent	Ref.
1	(Chile) Pablo Jara	Tormenta FC	North Carolina FC	
2	(Ghana) Rashid Nuhu	Union Omaha	Forward Madison FC	
3	(United States) Will Palmquist	Richmond Kickers	Charlotte Independence	
4	(United States) Nick Holliday	North Carolina FC	Charlotte Independence	
5	(Philippines) Bernd Schipmann	Forward Madison FC	Greenville Triumph SC	
6	(United States) Sean Lewis	One Knoxville SC	Tormenta FC	
7	(Guatemala) Ricardo Jérez	Chattanooga Red Wolves SC	Lexington SC	
8	(Ghana) Rashid Nuhu	Union Omaha	Richmond Kickers	
9	(Philippines) Bernd Schipmann	Forward Madison FC	North Carolina FC	
10	(Philippines) Bernd Schipmann	Forward Madison FC	Northern Colorado Hailstorm	
11	(Jamaica) Amal Knight	Lexington SC	One Knoxville SC	
12	(United States) Edward Delgado	Northern Colorado Hailstorm	Lexington SC	
13	(United States) Sean Lewis	One Knoxville SC	Northern Colorado Hailstorm	
14	(Jamaica) Amal Knight	Lexington SC	North Carolina FC	
15	(Ghana) Rashid Nuhu	Union Omaha	One Knoxville SC	
16	(Philippines) Bernd Schipmann	Forward Madison FC	Tormenta FC	
17	(Jamaica) Amal Knight	Lexington SC	Charlotte Independence	
18	(United States) Mitch North	Central Valley Fuego FC	Lexington SC	
19	(Jamaica) Amal Knight	Lexington SC	Union Omaha	
20	(Chile) Pablo Jara	Tormenta FC	Forward Madison FC	
21	(Jamaica) Amal Knight	Lexington SC	Northern Colorado Hailstorm	
22	(Philippines) Bernd Schipmann	Forward Madison FC	Chattanooga Red Wolves SC	
23	(Jamaica) Amal Knight	Lexington SC	One Knoxville SC	
24	(United States) Mitch North	Central Valley Fuego FC	Forward Madison FC	
25	(Jamaica) Amal Knight	Lexington SC	Greenville Triumph SC	
26	(Jamaica) Amal Knight	Lexington SC	Northern Colorado Hailstorm	
27	(United States) Brooks Thompson	North Carolina FC	Tormenta FC	
28	(Ghana) Rashid Nuhu	Union Omaha	Central Valley Fuego FC	
29	(Ghana) Rashid Nuhu	Union Omaha	North Carolina FC	
30	(United States) Paul Lewis	Central Valley Fuego FC	Greenville Triumph SC	
31	(United States) Sean Lewis	One Knoxville SC	North Carolina FC	

Team of the Week
Week	Goalkeeper	Defenders	Midfielders	Forwards	Bench	Ref.
**1**	(Japan) Fitzgerald (RIC)	(United States) Dimick (CLT) (United States) Navarro (NCA) (England) Thomas (KNX)	(United States) Akale (TRM) (United States) Murphy (TRM) (Puerto Rico) Servania (NCA) (Kenya) Otieno (TRM) (United States) **Villalobos** (KNX)	(United States) Keegan (KNX) (France) Obertan (CLT)	(United States) Akoto (TRM) (England) Bentley (RIC) (United States) Fox (LEX) (Germany) Hornsby (RIC) (Chile) Jara (TRM) (Democratic Republic of the Congo) Mbuyu (CLT) (Brazil) Mentzingen (NCA)	
**2**	(Mexico) Avilez (CHA)	(United States) Dimick (CLT) (Togo) Dutey (CLT) (Liberia) Johnson (CLT) (England) Rogers (NCO)	(United States) Gebhard (MAD) (United States) Scearce (OMA) (Spain) **Vinyals** (RIC)	(United States) Akale (TRM) (Grenada) Belmar (RIC) (United States) Chaney (MAD)	(Jamaica) Bennett (CLT) (Colombia) Castro (GVL) (Austria) Crull (MAD) (United States) Dunwell (CLT) (United States) Evans (NCO) (United States) Gil (OMA) (Ghana) Nuhu (OMA)	
**3**	(United States) Delgado (NCO)	(Republic of Ireland) Cornwall (NCO) (Senegal) Dabo (CV) (United States) Dimick (CLT) (United States) Spielman (CLT)	(El Salvador) Cerritos (CV) (United States) Ibarra (CLT) (United States) Liborio (CHA) (Brazil) **Mentzingen** (NCA)	(United States) Balogun (LEX) (Jamaica) Gordon (RIC)	(United States) Benton (NCA) (United States) Hernández (NCO) (Jamaica) Kelly (CLT) (Serbia) Lukic (NCO) (England) Nortey (NCO) (United States) North (CV) (Cuba) Rendón (NCO)	
**4**	(Philippines) Schipmann (MAD)	(Austria) Crull (MAD) (United States) Mason (TRM) (Comoros) Souahy (OMA)	(Brazil) **Fonseca** (TRM) (Lebanon) Khoury (TRM) (United States) Paoli (CHA) (France) Perez (NCA) (Cape Verde) Varela (CHA)	(Jamaica) Kelly (CLT) (United States) Meza (OMA)	(Saint Vincent and the Grenadines) Anderson (NCA) (El Salvador) Cerritos (CV) (Cape Verde) Dos Santos (OMA) (United States) Gil (OMA) (Guyana) Mohammed (LEX) (Ghana) Nuhu (OMA) (United States) Polak (GVL)	
**5**	(Philippines) Schipmann (MAD)	(Austria) Crull (MAD) (England) **Green** (LEX) (United States) Waldeck (KNX)	(Bulgaria) Bijev (CV) (United States) Gallardo (OMA) (United States) Gebhard (MAD) (Lebanon) Khoury (TRM) (France) Perez (NCA)	(United States) Chaney (MAD) (United States) Keegan (KNX)	(Saint Vincent and the Grenadines) Anderson (NCA) (United States) Aune (RIC) (Jamaica) Brown (LEX) (Venezuela) Cichero (MAD) (United States) Lewis (KNX) (Colombia) Palacios (OMA) (United States) Pilato (GVL)	
**6**	(United States) Pack (CLT)	(United States) Kilwien (TRM) (United States) Polak (GVL) (Comoros) Souahy (OMA) (United States) Spielman (CLT)	(Brazil) Cassini (TRM) (Brazil) **Coutinho** (GVL) (Brazil) Mentzingen (NCA) (United States) Pilato (GVL)	(Saint Vincent and the Grenadines) Anderson (NCA) (Colombia) Castro (GVL)	(United States) Biggar (GVL) (United States) Flanagan (CLT) (United States) Holliday (NCA) (Lebanon) Khoury (TRM) (United States) McLaughlin (NCA) (United States) Maldonado (NCA) (United States) Walker (GVL)	
**7**	(United States) Pack (CLT)	(Puerto Rico) Cardona (CHA) (Germany) Hornsby (RIC) (United States) O’Hearn (KNX) (Australia) Osmond (MAD)	(United States) Martinez (MAD) (Brazil) Mentzingen (NCA) (France) Perez (NCA) (Netherlands) van der Pluijm (KNX)	(United States) Amann (NCO) (United States) **Meza** (OMA)	(United States) Aune (RIC) (United States) Gebhard (MAD) (United States) Gil (OMA) (Mexico) Madrid (CHA) (Ghana) Mensah (CHA) (Philippines) Schipmann (MAD) (Argentina) Terzaghi (RIC)	
**8**	(Chile) Jara (TRM)	(United States) Aune (RIC) (Austria) Crull (MAD) (United States) Mehl (MAD) (United States) Polak (GVL)	(Brazil) Coutinho (GVL) (Brazil) Fonseca (TRM) (Switzerland) **MacKinnon** (GVL) (Brazil) Mentzingen (NCA)	(Colombia) Castro (GVL) (United States) Sierakowski (TRM)	(United States) Akale (TRM) (Germany) Hornsby (RIC) (Jamaica) Kelly (CLT) (Italy) Mastrantonio (OMA) (Ghana) Nuhu (OMA) (France) Perez (NCA) (United States) Walker (GVL)	
**9**	(Jamaica) **Knight** (LEX)	(United States) Aune (RIC) (Republic of Ireland) Cornwall (NCO) (United States) Fricke (GVL) (Trinidad and Tobago) Mohammed (LEX) (Australia) Osmond (MAD)	(Brazil) Coutinho (GVL) (United States) Gebhard (MAD) (United States) Ibarra (CLT) (United States) Martinez (MAD)	(United States) Amann (NCO)	(United States) Balogun (LEX) (Austria) Crull (MAD) (Germany) Hornsby (RIC) (United States) Keegan (KNX) (Scotland) King (NCO) (United States) Pack (CLT) (England) Rogers (NCO)	
**10**	(United States) Lewis (KNX)	(United States) Claudio (KNX) (United States) Crisler (KNX) (Cameroon) Ngah (CLT) (Nigeria) Opara (NCO)	(El Salvador) Cerritos (CV) (United States) Espinoza (CHA) (Brazil) **Gomiero** (RIC) (France) Perez (NCA)	(United States) Amann (NCO) (Saint Vincent and the Grenadines) Anderson (NCA)	(United States) Aune (RIC) (South Africa) Bosua (TRM) (United States) Delgado (NCO) (Spain) Garcia NCA (United States) Gil (OMA) (Honduras) Kelly-Rosales (KNX) (United States) McLaughlin (NCA)	
**11**	(United States) Pack (CLT)	(United States) Akoto (TRM) (Germany) Leinhos (KNX) (Cuba) Rendón (NCO) (United States) Robertson (LEX)	(United States) Boyce (GVL) (United States) Gil (OMA) (Scotland) King (NCO) (United States) Payne (MAD)	(United States) Amann (NCO) (United States) **Meza** (OMA)	(United States) Brewer (OMA) (Senegal) Ciss (CLT) (United States) Delgado (NCO) (Brazil) Dolabella (OMA) (Kenya) Otieno (TRM) (United States) Sukow (RIC)	
**12**	(United States) Pack (CLT)	(El Salvador) Blanco (NCA) (United States) Fox (LEX) (Belize) Nembhard (TRM) (Cuba) Rendón (NCO) (England) Rogers (NCO)	(El Salvador) Cerritos (CV) (Liberia) Johnson (CLT) (Democratic Republic of the Congo) Mbuyu (CLT)	(United States) Chaney (MAD) (Senegal) **Diouf** (LEX)	(United States) Fitch (RIC) (Scotland) King (NCO) (United States) Mazzola (GVL) (Puerto Rico) Servania (NCA) (England) Sterling (TRM) (Argentina) Terzaghi (RIC)	
**13**	(Jamaica) Knight (LEX)	(Austria) Crull (MAD) (Nigeria) Opara (NCO) (Cuba) Rendón (NCO)	(Mexico) Carrera-García (CV) (Jamaica) Marsh (CHA) (United States) Martinez (MAD) (United States) Prentice (MAD)	(Ghana) Mensah (CHA) (England) Sterling (TRM) (Argentina) **Terzaghi** (RIC)	(Senegal) Diouf (LEX) (United States) Folla (NCO) (United States) Lewis (KNX) (Switzerland) MacKinnon (GVL) (United States) Meza (OMA) (United States) Murillo (LEX) (United States) Payne (MAD)	
**14**	(United States) Lewis (KNX)	(United States) Mehl (MAD) (Australia) Osmond (MAD) (United States) Polak (GVL) (United States) **Robertson** (LEX)	(Brazil) Mentzingen (NCA) (United States) Payne (MAD) (France) Perez (NCA) (Scotland) Ross (KNX)	(Australia) Baynham (LEX) (United States) McLaughlin (NCA)	(South Africa) Bartman (MAD) (Senegal) Diouf (LEX) (England) Green (LEX) (Honduras) Kelly-Rosales (KNX) (Philippines) Schipmann (MAD) (England) Skelton (KNX) (Jamaica) Smart (LEX)	
**15**	(Ghana) Nuhu (OMA)	(Austria) Crull (MAD) (United States) Flanagan (CLT) (Italy) Milanese (OMA) (United States) Waldeck (KNX)	(Jamaica) Brown (LEX) (Scotland) King (NCO) (Switzerland) **MacKinnon** (GVL)	(Colombia) Castro (GVL) (Serbia) Ilić (KNX) (Argentina) Terzaghi (RIC)	(United States) Chaney (MAD) (United States) Delgado (NCO) (France) Djedje (CLT) (England) Rogers (NCO) (United States) Scearce (OMA) (England) Skelton (KNX) (England) Thomas (KNX)	
**16**	(United States) Palmquist (RIC)	(Belize) Nembhard (TRM) (United States) Aune (RIC) (United States) Fricke (GVL)	(Brazil) Mentzingen (NCA) (Spain) Vinyals (RIC) (United States) Walker (GVL) (Ghana) Adjei (TRM)	(Saint Vincent and the Grenadines) **Anderson** (NCA) (United States) Meza (OMA) (United States) McLaughlin (NCA)	(United States) Barnathan (RIC) (United States) Fitch (RIC) (United States) Payne (MAD) (United States) Scearce (OMA) (Philippines) Schipmann (MAD) (England) Sterling (TRM) (United States) Sukow (RIC)	
**17**	(Ghana) Nuhu (OMA)	(United States) Acoff (OMA) (United States) Crisler (KNX) (Australia) Osmond (MAD)	(England) Rogers (NCO) (United States) Ibarra (CLT) (Democratic Republic of the Congo) Mbuyu (CLT) (United States) Scearce (OMA)	(United States) **Amann** (NCO) (Cape Verde) Dos Santos (OMA) (Jamaica) Kelly (CLT)	(United States) Brito (OMA) (Senegal) Diouf (LEX) (Brazil) Mentzingen (NCA) (Cuba) Rendón (NCO) (Argentina) Sabella (NCO) (Philippines) Schipmann (MAD) (England) Skelton (KNX)	
**18**	(United States) North (CV)	(United States) Fitch (RIC) (Cuba) Rendón (NCO) (England) **Rogers** (NCO)	(United States) Akale (TRM) (Honduras) Kelly-Rosales (KNX) (Scotland) King (NCO) (Spain) Vinyals (RIC)	(Saint Vincent and the Grenadines) Anderson (NCA) (United States) Amann (NCO) (Jamaica) Marsh (CHA)	(Ghana) Adjei (TRM) (Senegal) Diouf (LEX) (United States) Gebhard (MAD) (United States) Mazzola (GVL) (United States) McLaughlin (NCA) (Belize) Nembhard (TRM) (England) Sterling (TRM)	
**19**	(Jamaica) Knight (LEX)	(United States) Chavez (CV) (United States) Dimick (CLT) (United States) Fricke (GVL) (Nigeria) Opara (NCO)	(Scotland) King (NCO) (Democratic Republic of the Congo) Mbuyu (CLT) (Trinidad and Tobago) Mohammed (LEX)	(Colombia) **Castro** (GVL) (Senegal) Diouf (LEX) (Jamaica) Marsh (CHA)	(Brazil) Cassini (TRM) (Senegal) Ciss (CLT) (Spain) Fernández (KNX) (United States) Flanagan (CLT) (United States) Ibarra (CLT) (United States) Mazzola (GVL) (United States) Villalobos (KNX)	
**20**	(United States) Pack (CLT)	(United States) Akoto (TRM) (Lebanon) Khoury (TRM) (United States) Young (NCA) (England) Skelton (KNX)	(France) Obertan (CLT) (Saint Kitts and Nevis) Somersall (NCA) (Spain) Vinyals (RIC)	(United States) Chaney (MAD) (Cape Verde) Dos Santos (OMA) (England) **Sterling** (TRM)	(Saint Vincent and the Grenadines) Anderson (NCA) (United States) Franke (GVL) (Jamaica) Kelly (CLT) (Scotland) King (NCO) (United States) Mazzola (GVL) (France) Perez (NCA) (Cuba) Rendón (NCO)	
**21**	(Mexico) Avilez (CHA)	(United States) Brewer (OMA) (United States) Fitch (RIC) (Italy) Mastrantonio (OMA) (England) Skelton (KNX)	(United States) Doyle (OMA) (United States) Robertson (LEX) (United States) Scearce (OMA)	(United States) Amann (NCO) (Colombia) Castro (GVL) (Senegal) **Diouf** (LEX)	(United States) Barnathan (RIC) (United States) Fox (LEX) (Jamaica) Kelly (CLT) (Brazil) Mentzingen (NCA) (Nigeria) Opara (NCO) (England) Sterling (TRM) (United States) Thompson (NCA)	
**22**	(United States) Pack (CLT)	(Puerto Rico) Cardona (CHA) (United States) Mason (TRM) (Nigeria) Opara (NCO) (United States) Robertson (LEX)	(Brazil) Fonseca (TRM) (Liberia) Johnson (CLT) (Spain) Vinyals (RIC)	(El Salvador) Cerritos (CV) (United States) McLaughlin (NCA) (Uganda) **Onen** (MAD)	(Sweden) Falck (CV) (United States) Lewis (KNX) (Mexico) Madrid (CHA) (Australia) Osmond (MAD) (United States) Payne (MAD) (France) Perez (NCA) (Argentina) Terzaghi (RIC)	
**23**	(United States) Delgado (NCO)	(United States) Crisler (KNX) (Honduras) Kelly-Rosales (KNX) (United States) Spielman (CLT)	(United States) Akale (TRM) (United States) Maldonado (NCA) (Puerto Rico) Servania (NCA) (Spain) Vinyals (RIC)	(Saint Vincent and the Grenadines) Anderson (NCA) (United States) Chaney (MAD) (England) **Sterling** (TRM)	(United States) Fox (LEX) (Liberia) Johnson (CLT) (Nigeria) Lawal (CV) (Democratic Republic of the Congo) Mbuyu (CLT) (Brazil) Mentzingen (NCA) (United States) Pack (CLT) (Saint Kitts and Nevis) Somersall (NCA)	
**24**	(United States) Delgado (NCO)	(Puerto Rico) Cardona (CHA) (Spain) Garcia (NCA) (Cuba) Rendón (NCO)	(United States) Hernández (CHA) (Ghana) Mensah (CHA) (Kenya) Otieno (TRM) (England) Rogers (NCO)	(United States) **Chaney** (MAD) (Brazil) Fonseca (TRM) (England) Sterling (TRM)	(United States) Amann (NCO) (United States) da Silva (MAD) (Spain) Fernández (KNX) (United States) Filipe (CHA) (United States) Labovitz (GVL) (Jamaica) Marsh (CHA) (United States) McGrane (OMA)	
**25**	(Jamaica) Knight (LEX)	(Puerto Rico) Cardona (CHA) (England) Skelton (KNX) (England) Smith (GVL) (Trinidad and Tobago) Williams (CHA)	(Sweden) Falck (CV) (Brazil) Gomiero (RIC) (Guyana) Mohammed (LEX) (Trinidad and Tobago) **Powder** (NCO)	(El Salvador) Cerritos (CV) (Jamaica) Marsh (CHA)	(Jamaica) Bennett (CLT) (Haiti) Dulysse (CV) (United States) Ibarra (CLT) (United States) Lemus (CV) (United States) Lewis (KNX) (England) O'Dwyer (RIC) (United States) Robertson (LEX)	
**26**	(United States) Pack (CLT)	(Nigeria) Opara (NCO) (England) Rogers (NCO) (United States) Spielman (CLT)	(Brazil) **Dolabella** (OMA) (United States) Gil (OMA) (United States) Hernández (NCO) (Brazil) Mentzingen (NCA) (Puerto Rico) Servania (NCA)	(Saint Vincent and the Grenadines) Anderson (NCA) (Senegal) Diouf (LEX)	(United States) Brito (OMA) (Austria) Crull (MAD) (United States) Flanagan (CLT) (United States) Lewis (KNX) (United States) Meza (OMA) (United States) Robles (NCO) (Comoros) Souahy (OMA)	
**27**	(United States) **Delgado** (NCO)	(United States) Akoto (TRM) (Austria) Crull (MAD) (Italy) Milanese (OMA) (England) Smith (GVL)	(United States) Akale (TRM) (Brazil) Fonseca (TRM) (Senegal) Mané (LEX) (Saint Kitts and Nevis) Somersall (NCA)	(Cape Verde) Dos Santos (OMA) (United States) Gebhard (MAD)	(United States) Brito (OMA) (Colombia) Castro (GVL) (United States) Mazzola (GVL) (England) Mesias (MAD) (United States) Robertson (LEX) (England) Rogers (NCO) (England) Sterling (TRM)	
**28**	(Chile) Jara (TRM)	(United States) Acoff (OMA) (Spain) Garcia (NCA) (United States) Kraft (CHA) (England) Rogers (NCO)	(Senegal) Ciss (CLT) (United States) **Filipe** (CHA) (Puerto Rico) Servania (NCA)	(Saint Vincent and the Grenadines) Anderson (NCA) (Senegal) Diouf (LEX) (United States) McLaughlin (NCA)	(Austria) Crull (MAD) (Malawi) Malango (CHA) (United States) Meza (OMA) (Trinidad and Tobago) Powder (NCO) (United States) Sierakowski (TRM) (Saint Kitts and Nevis) Somersall (NCA) (United States) Thompson (NCA)	
**29**	(United States) Palmquist (RIC)	(Spain) Fernández (KNX) (United States) Jackson (LEX) (United States) Knutson (TRM) (England) Rogers (NCO)	(Senegal) Diouf (LEX) (Malawi) Malango (CHA) (Brazil) Mentzingen (NCA) (Spain) Vinyals (RIC)	(United States) **Amann** (NCO) (England) Sterling (TRM)	(Mexico) Carrera-García (CV) (United States) Gil (OMA) (United States) Lewis (KNX) (Italy) Milanese (OMA) (Argentina) Morán (RIC) (England) Skelton (KNX) (United States) Villalobos (KNX)	
**30**	(United States) Palmquist (RIC)	(United States) Acoff (OMA) (United States) Fricke (GVL) (Italy) Milanese (OMA)	(United States) Gavilanes (GVL) (United States) Gil (OMA) (United States) Kunga (OMA) (Spain) Vinyals (RIC)	(United States) Amann (NCO) (Cape Verde) **Dos Santos** (OMA) (United States) Labovitz (GVL)	(Colombia) Castro (GVL) (United States) Delgado (NCO) (United States) Filipe (CHA) (United States) Lee (GVL) (United States) McLaughlin (NCA) (United States) Scearce (OMA) (England) Smith (GVL)	
**31**	(United States) Causey (LEX)	(United States) Fernandes (NCA) (United States) Mason (TRM) (England) Rogers (NCO)	(Senegal) **Dieye** (CV) (United States) Pilato (GVL) (Cuba) Rendón (NCO) (Spain) Vinyals (RIC)	(United States) Amann (NCO) (El Salvador) Cerritos (CV) (United States) McLaughlin (NCA)	(Colombia) Castro (GVL) (Cape Verde) Dos Santos (OMA) (United States) Filipe (CHA) (Lebanon) Khoury (TRM) (United States) Kunga (OMA) (United States) Lewis (KNX) (England) O'Dwyer (RIC)	
**Bold** denotes Player of the Week
