= 2021 Richmond Kickers season =

Richmond Kickers
2021 season
- Owner: 22 Holdings, LLC
- Head coach: Darren Sawatzky
- Stadium: City Stadium
- USL League One: 5th
- USL1 Playoffs: Quarterfinals
- U.S. Open Cup: Did not qualify
- Bon Secours Cup: Winners
- Top goalscorer: League: Terzaghi (18); All: Terzaghi (18)
- Highest home attendance: 3,212 (10/26 v. MAD)
- Lowest home attendance: 1,445 (8/14 v. NE)
- Average home league attendance: 2,051
- Biggest win: NE 0–3 RIC (4/17)
- Biggest defeat: NC 4–0 RIC (7/21)
Home colors	Away colors	Third colors

The 2021 Richmond Kickers season was the club's 29th season of existence, their third season in USL League One, and their 17th season in the third tier of American soccer. The Kickers were led by second-year head coach, Darren Sawatzky, and looked to improve on their 4th-place finish in 2020.

This was the first season since 2015 without Conor Shanosky, who retired from professional football after playing for the Kickers for five seasons.

Due to the COVID-19 pandemic and the associated vaccination rollout, the season began on April 17, 2021. The season concluded on October 30, 2021. Due to the pandemic, the U.S. Open Cup was truncated and subsequently canceled due to the pandemic. The Kickers finished the USL League One regular season in 5th place, qualifying them for the USL League One Playoffs, making it their first appearance in the playoffs since 2016. There, the Kickers were eliminated in the first round against FC Tucson.

== Background ==
The 2020 season was significantly impacted by the COVID-19 pandemic. The season, originally slated to begin on March 28, 2020, did not begin until July 25, 2020. The season originally was slated to end on September 30, 2020, but concluded on October 24, 2020. The 28-match season was abbreviated to 16 matches, and the playoffs were reduced from a four-team playoff, to a single game championship. During the truncated season, the Kickers had a good turn of fortune, finishing fourth in the league table, and having a winning a record. It was the Kickers' best regular season performance since 2014. Despite the record, the club on the final day of the season failed to reach the USL Championship Game after losing at home to Chattanooga. Striker, Emiliano Terzaghi, scored 10 goals during the season, which was the best performance by a striker for the Kickers since Yudai Imura in 2016. Terzaghi had a 0.63 goals per game average, which was the best performance by a striker for Richmond since Robert Ssejjemba in 2006.

On October 30, 2020, Matt Spear stepped down as the club's president to focus on family reasons. Spear had been the club's president since 2019.

== Transfers ==
=== Transfers in ===
Date	Position	No.	Name	From	Fee/notes	Ref.
February 9, 2021	DF	20	(Costa Rica) Esteban Calvo	(United States) FC Tucson	Free	
February 11, 2021	MF	10	(Spain) Nil Vinyals	(United States) Tormenta	Free	
February 15, 2021	GK	44	(United States) Austin Aviza	(United States) Orlando City B	Free	
February 18, 2021	DF	15	(United States) Jalen Crisler	(United States) Forward Madison	Free	
February 18, 2021	DF	24	(United States) Nathan Aune	(United States) Union Omaha	Free	
February 22, 2021	FW	19	(Argentina) Hernán González	(Argentina) Juventud Unida	Free	
February 24, 2021	MF	6	(Argentina) Zacarías Morán	(Argentina) River Plate	Free	
March 4, 2021	DF	2	(United States) Juan Pablo Monticelli	(United States) Orlando City B	Free	
March 8, 2021	MF	88	(United States) Cameron Vickers	(United States) FC Motown	Free	
April 6, 2021	GK	13	(United States) Austin Causey	(United States) New England Revolution II	Free	

=== Transfers out ===
Date	Position	No.	Name	To	Fee/notes	Ref.
August 6, 2020	DF	5	(United States) Conor Shanosky	Retired	Retired	
December 31, 2020	DF	12	(United States) Kyle Venter	Retired	Retired	
December 31, 2020	GK	20	(United States) Lee Johnston		Released	
December 31, 2020	MF	21	(United States) Greg Boehme		Released	
December 31, 2020	DF	22	(United States) Hassan Pinto	(United States) Loudoun United	Released	
December 31, 2020	MF	80	(Zambia) Mutaya Mwape		Released	
December 31, 2020	MF	93	(Italy) Gianluca Cuomo		Released	
December 31, 2020	GK	94	(United States) Matt Broomall	(Northern Ireland) Ballymacash Rangers	Released	
December 31, 2020	MF	98	(United States) Ryley Kraft		Released	
December 31, 2020	MF	77	(Ghana) Charles Boateng	(Ghana) WAFA	End of loan	
February 11, 2021	DF	18	(Ghana) Wahab Ackwei	(United States) Loudoun United	Free	
March 27, 2021	MF	8	(Ghana) Amass Amankona	(United States) South Bend Lions	Released	
April 6, 2021	MF	11	(Colombia) David Diosa	(United States) New Amsterdam	Free	

== Competitive ==
=== Exhibitions ===
March 24, 2021 Preseason	Richmond Kickers	5–0	Virginia United FC	Richmond, Virginia
	Magalhães 10' (Morán); Bolanos 16' (Pavone); Terzaghi 19' (pen.); González 26' (Bolanos); Falck 38'	Report		Stadium: City Stadium

March 27, 2021 Preseason	Philadelphia Union II	0–4	Richmond Kickers	Chester, Pennsylvania
		Report	Bolanos 10'; Monticelli 44' (Morán); Terzaghi 45+' (Bolanos), (yellow card) 51'; Alves 74' (Terzaghi)	Stadium: Power Training Complex

April 5, 2021 Preseason	Richmond Kickers	4–0	North Carolina FC	Richmond, Virginia
	González 12', 13' (Bolanos); Monticelli 24'; Magalhães 62' (Vickers)	Report		Stadium: City Stadium
Note: Played in three 30-minute periods.

April 10, 2021 Preseason	Richmond Kickers	—	Loudoun United
		Report
Note: Cancelled due to positive COVID-19 test within Loudoun United organization.

=== USL League One ===
==== Standings ====
Pos	Team	Pld	W	D	L	GF	GA	GD	Pts	Qualification
3	Chattanooga Red Wolves SC	28	11	11	6	37	29	+8	44	Qualification for the play-offs
4	FC Tucson	28	11	7	10	44	42	+2	40	Qualification for the play-offs
5	Richmond Kickers	28	11	7	10	35	36	−1	40	Qualification for the play-offs
6	North Texas SC	28	10	10	8	40	32	+8	40	Qualification for the play-offs
7	Toronto FC II	28	10	8	10	34	32	+2	38	

Source: USL League One
Rules for classification: 1) points; 2) total wins; 3) total goal differential; 4) total goals scored; 5) points earned against top four Conference finishers; 6) disciplinary points; 7) drawing of lots.

==== Results by matchday ====
Matchday	1	2	3	4	5	6	7	8	9	10	11	12	13	14	15	16	17	18	19	20	21	22	23	24	25	26	27	28
Stadium	A	H	A	H	H	A	H																					
Result	W	L	L	W	D	L	W	D	D	L	W	D	L	D	W	L	D	W	D	L	L	W	W	W	W	W	L	L
Position																												

Updated to match(es) played on October 25, 2020. Source: USL League One
A = Away; H = Home; W = Win; D = Draw; L = Loss; P = Postponed

==== Match results ====
April 17, 2021 1	New England Revolution II	0–3	Richmond Kickers	Foxborough, MA
19:00 EDT	Mafla (yellow card) 70'; Caicedo (yellow card) 76'; Dulysse (yellow card) 88'	Report	Bolanos 35' (yellow card) 36'; Monticelli 45+2'; Morán (yellow card) 79'; Anderson 90+3'	Stadium: Gillette Stadium; Attendance: 0 Referee: Thomas Snyder

April 24, 2021 2	Richmond Kickers	0–1	Greenville Triumph	Richmond, VA
18:30 EDT	Monticelli (yellow card) 28'; González (yellow card) 35'; Morán (yellow card) 44'; Terzaghi (yellow card) 67'	Report	Murillo (yellow card) 33' (yellow-red card) 40'; Mohamed (yellow card) 61'; Pavone 74' (o.g.); Ibarra (yellow card) 88'	Stadium: City Stadium; Attendance: 1,606; Referee: John Griggs

May 2, 2021 3	Fort Lauderdale CF	2–1	Richmond Kickers	Fort Lauderdale, FL
19:30 EDT	Hundal 20', 83'; Acosta (yellow card) 90+2'; Rosales (yellow card) 90+7'	Report	Pavone (yellow card) 70'; Vinyals 75'	Stadium: Inter Miami CF Stadium; Referee: Adam Brzozowiec

May 8, 2021 4	Richmond Kickers	2–0	Tormenta	Richmond, VA
18:30 EDT	Crisler (yellow card) 33'; Morán (yellow card) 78'; Terzaghi 80', 89' (pen.); Vickers (yellow card) 90+8'; Vinyals (yellow card) 90+8'	Report	Phelps (yellow card) 18'; Eckenrode (yellow card) 89'	Stadium: City Stadium; Attendance: 1,789; Referee: Matthew Franz

May 22, 2021 5	Richmond Kickers	0–0	North Carolina FC	Richmond, VA
18:30 EDT	Calvo (yellow card) 80'	Report	Simpson (yellow card) 44'; Blanco Flores (yellow card) 65'; Kamara (yellow card) 90+3'; Coan (yellow card) 90+3'	Stadium: City Stadium; Attendance: 2,377; Referee: John Matto

May 29, 2021 6	Chattanooga Red Wolves	2–1	Richmond Kickers	Chattanooga, TN
18:30 EST	Navarro (yellow card) 30'; Capozucchi (yellow card) 45'; Ruiz 53', (yellow card) 74'; Galindrez 84'	Report	Terzaghi (yellow card) 21'; Anderson (yellow card) 45+3', (goal) 47'; Vinyals (yellow card) 59'; Bolduc (yellow card) 89'	Stadium: CHI Memorial Stadium; Attendance: 1,752; Referee: Ben Meyer

June 5, 2021 7	Richmond Kickers	3–2	New England Revolution II	Richmond, VA
18:30 EDT	Bolduc 1'; Crisler (yellow card) 36'; Monticelli 40'; Terzaghi 51'; Vinyals (yellow card) 83'	Report	N. Buck 30'; Cayet 76'; Michel (yellow card) 90+1'	Stadium: City Stadium; Attendance: 2,360; Referee: JC Griggs

June 12, 2021 8	Forward Madison	0–0	Richmond Kickers	Madison, WI
20:00 EDT	Barriga Toyama (yellow card) 53'; Tobin (yellow card) 55'; Díaz (yellow card) 59'; Gebhard (yellow card) 71'	Report	Morán (yellow card) 16'; Terzaghi (yellow card) 32'; Crisler (yellow card) 55'	Stadium: Breese Stevens Field; Attendance: 2,929; Referee: Laura Rodriguez

June 19, 2021 9	Richmond Kickers	1–1	Union Omaha	Richmond, VA
18:30 EDT	Terzaghi (yellow card) 57'; Otieno 76' (o.g.); Anderson (yellow card) 80'	Report	Sousa 31' (yellow card) 75'; Vanacore-Decker (yellow card) 64'; Otieno (yellow card) 73'	Stadium: City Stadium; Attendance: 2,009; Referee: John Matto

June 25, 2021 10	North Carolina FC	2–1	Richmond Kickers	Cary, NC
19:00 EDT	Flick (yellow card) 33' (goal) 47'; Kamara 56'; Coan (yellow card) 90+3'	Report	Terzaghi 6'; Calvo (yellow card) 11' (yellow-red card) 59'; Malgahes (yellow card) 46'; Crisler (yellow card) 65'	Stadium: WakeMed Soccer Park; Attendance: 2,367; Referee: Luis Arroyo

July 3, 2021 11	Richmond Kickers	3–2	North Texas SC	Richmond, VA
19:00 EDT	Aune (yellow card) 20'; Monticelli (yellow card) 29'; Terzaghi 33', 52'; Crisler (yellow card) 36'; Bolanos 71'; Morán (yellow card) 43' (yellow-red card) 88'; Vinyals (yellow card) 86'	Report	Kazu 26' (yellow card) 88'; Almaguer 41'	Stadium: City Stadium; Attendance: 1,858; Referee: Nickrod Fateh

July 17, 2021 12	Richmond Kickers	1–1	Fort Lauderdale CF	Richmond, VA
18:30 EDT	Falck (yellow card) 86'; Terzaghi 86'	Report	Curry 6'; Taghvai-Najib (yellow card) 37'; Penn (yellow card) 53'; Poplawski (yellow card) 82'	Stadium: City Stadium; Attendance: 1,723; Referee: William Steffen

July 21, 2021 13	North Carolina FC	4–0	Richmond Kickers	Cary, NC
19:00 EDT	Kristo 19', 41'; Coan 48', 90+2'	Report	Morán (yellow card) 70'; Magalhães (red card) 85'	Stadium: WakeMed Soccer Park; Attendance: 2,118; Referee: Emma Richards

July 24, 2021 14	Tormenta	2–2	Richmond Kickers	Statesboro, GA
20:00 EDT	Micaletto 2' (pen.); Perez 62'; Liadi (yellow card) 75'	Report	Crisler (yellow card) 2'; Terzaghi 63'; Calvo (yellow card) 66'; Cole (yellow card) 79'; Anderson 88'; Morán (yellow card) 90+1'	Stadium: Eagle Field; Attendance: 1,237; Referee: DeShun Beard

July 31, 2021 15	Richmond Kickers	1–0	FC Tucson	Richmond, VA
18:30 EDT	Terzaghi 19' (pen.); Alves (yellow card) 52'; Magalhães (yellow card) 53'; Fitzgerald (yellow card) 86'; Pavone (yellow card) 90+5'	Report	Bedoya (yellow card) 32'; Schenfeld (yellow card) 44'; Uzo (yellow card) 57'; Ferriol (yellow card) 77'; Dennis (yellow card) 84'; Corfe (yellow card) 90+1'	Stadium: City Stadium; Attendance: 2,691; Referee: Sara Griggs

August 6, 2021 16	Toronto FC II	2–1	Richmond Kickers	Toronto, ON
4:00 PM EDT	Monticelli 16' (o.g.); Carlini (yellow card) 18', (goal) 69'; Campbell (yellow card) 53'; Goulbourne (yellow card) 88'	Report	Vinyals 25' (pen.); Falck (yellow card) 52'; Aune (yellow card) 59'; Monticelli (yellow card) 90'	Stadium: BMO Training Ground; Referee: Scott Bowman

August 14, 2021 17	Richmond Kickers	2–2	New England Revolution II	Richmond, VA
6:30 PM EDT	Terzaghi 26', (yellow card) 35', (goal) 53'; Morán (yellow card) 38'; Fitzgerald (yellow card) 79'; González (yellow card) 84'	Report	Presley (yellow card) 42'; Michel (yellow card) 55'; Verfurth (yellow card) 59'; N. Buck 86'; Kizza 87'	Stadium: City Stadium; Attendance: 1,445; Referee: John Matto

August 22, 2021 18	Greenville Triumph	0–2	Richmond Kickers	Greenville, SC
7:00 PM EDT	Lee (yellow card) 68'; Mejia (yellow card) 90+1'	Report	Bolanos 46'; Terzaghi (yellow card) 55', (goal) 81'; Monticelli (yellow card) 71'	Stadium: Legacy Early College Field; Attendance: 2,061; Referee: Izlen Peksenar

August 28, 2021 19	Richmond Kickers	0–0	North Carolina FC	Richmond, VA
18:30 EDT	Calvo (yellow card) 43'; Crisler (yellow card) 90+3'	Report	Flick (yellow card) 27'; Kamara (yellow card) 76'	Stadium: City Stadium; Attendance: 1,807; Referee: Austin Saini

September 11, 2021 20	Forward Madison	1–0	Richmond Kickers	Madison, WI
8:00 PM EDT	Sierakowski 50'; Leonard (yellow card) 66'; Gebhard (yellow card) 72'	Report	Calvo (yellow card) 26'; Vinyals (yellow card) 57'; Bolanos (yellow card) 80'	Stadium: Breese Stevens Field; Attendance: 2,744; Referee: Samantha Martinez

September 17, 2021 21	New England Revolution II	3–1	Richmond Kickers	Foxborough, MA
7:00 PM EDT	Rennicks 33'; Rivera 47'; Rozhansky (yellow card) 70'; Rice (yellow card) 74'; Bajraktarevic (yellow card) 75'; N. Buck 90+2'	Report	Bolanos 3'; Terzaghi (yellow card) 36'; Anderson (yellow card) 76'; González (yellow card) 90'	Stadium: Gillette Stadium; Attendance: 125; Referee: Kenneth Rojas

September 25, 2021 22	Richmond Kickers	1–0	Toronto FC II	Richmond, VA
18:30 EDT	Vinyals (yellow card) 28'; Morán (yellow card) 35'; Crisler (yellow card) 79'; Terzaghi 90+3'; Anderson (yellow card) 90+5'	Report	Antonoglou (yellow card) 30'; Petrasso (yellow card) 73'	Stadium: City Stadium; Attendance: 2,223; Referee: Danielle Chesky

October 2, 2021 23	Richmond Kickers	1–0	Chattanooga Red Wolves	Richmond, VA
18:30 EDT	Bolanos (yellow card) 33'; Magalhães (yellow card) 38'; Terzaghi 52'; Vinyals (yellow card) 82'; Dubose (yellow card) 84'; Pavone (yellow card) 90'; Bolduc (yellow card) 90+8'	Report	Ramos (yellow card) 29' (yellow-red card) 85'; Ortiz (yellow card) 43'; Pineda (yellow card) 45+1'	Stadium: City Stadium; Attendance: 2,868; Referee: Matt Franz

October 6, 2021 24	Richmond Kickers	1–0	Forward Madison	Richmond, VA
18:30 EDT	Terzaghi 8' (yellow card) 84'; Bolanos (yellow card) 74'	Report	Rad (yellow card) 80'; Craig (yellow card) 90'	Stadium: City Stadium; Attendance: 1,126; Referee: William Steffen

October 10, 2021 25	North Texas SC	1–2	Richmond Kickers	Arlington, TX
19:30 EDT	Rayo 33'; Lucão (yellow card) 64'; Munjoma (yellow card) 80'	Report	Calvo (yellow card) 47'; Magalhães (yellow card) 47', (goal) 90+5'; Morán 81'	Stadium: Choctaw Stadium; Attendance: 622; Referee: Esad Omanovic

October 16, 2021 26	Richmond Kickers	3–2	Forward Madison	Richmond, VA
18:30 EDT	Cole (yellow card) 5', (goal) 32'; Terzaghi 45', 88'; Morán (yellow card) 45+4'; Monticelli (yellow card) 74'	Report	Trimmingham 8'; Sukow (yellow card) 14'; Leonard (yellow card) 25'; Rad (yellow card) 42'; Tobin (yellow card) 44'; Calvo 47' (o.g.); Jepson (yellow card) 80'	Stadium: City Stadium; Attendance: 3,212; Referee: John Matto

October 23, 2021 27	Union Omaha	2–0	Richmond Kickers	Papillion, NE
19:00 EDT	Hurst (yellow card) 34' (goal) 88'; Otieno 85' (yellow card) 90+4'; Sousa (yellow card) 90'	Report	Bolduc (yellow card) 30'; Bolanos (yellow card) 77'; Morán (yellow card) 84'	Stadium: Werner Park; Attendance: 2,943; Referee: Luis Arroyo

October 30, 2021 28	FC Tucson	4–2	Richmond Kickers	Tucson, AZ
22:00 EDT	Schenfeld 24' (yellow card) 45+2'; Corfe 42'; Mastrantonio 52'; Adams 58'	Report	Bolanos 22' (yellow card) 45'; Terzaghi 49' (pen.); Calvo (yellow card) 62'	Stadium: Kino North Stadium; Attendance: 1,566; Referee: Joseph Salinas

=== U.S. Open Cup ===
Due to the COVID-19 pandemic, only one team from USL League One (league champions), qualified for the 2021 U.S. Open Cup. However in July 2021, the Open Cup was canceled.

=== USL-1 Playoffs ===
November 6, 2021	FC Tucson	1–0	Richmond Kickers	Tucson, AZ
7:00 PM MST	Corfe 87'	Report		Stadium: Kino North Stadium; Attendance: 1,793; Referee: Jeremy Scheer

== Statistics ==
=== Appearances and goals ===
Numbers after plus–sign (+) denote appearances as a substitute.

No.	Pos	Nat	Player	Total		USL-1		USL-1 Playoffs		U.S. Open Cup	
No.	Pos	Nat	Player	Apps	Goals	Apps	Goals	Apps	Goals	Apps	Goals
1	GK	(Japan) JPN	Akira Fitzgerald	22	0	22+0	0	0	0	0	0
2	DF	(United States) USA	Ian Antley	1	0	1+0	0	0	0	0	0
3	DF	(United States) USA	Scott Thomsen	0	0	0	0	0	0	0	0
4	DF	(Brazil) BRA	Ivan Magalhães	0	0	0	0	0	0	0	0
5	DF	(United States) USA	Conor Shanosky	0	0	0	0	0	0	0	0
7	MF	(United States) USA	Matt Bolduc	0	0	0	0	0	0	0	0
8	MF	(Ghana) GHA	Amass Amankona	0	0	0	0	0	0	0	0
9	FW	(Brazil) BRA	Stanley Alves	0	0	0	0	0	0	0	0
10	FW	(Zambia) ZAM	Mutaya Mwape	0	0	0	0	0	0	0	0
11	MF	(Colombia) COL	David Diosa	0	0	0	0	0	0	0	0
12	DF	(United States) USA	Kyle Venter	0	0	0	0	0	0	0	0
14	DF	(United States) USA	Luke Pavone	0	0	0	0	0	0	0	0
15	FW	(Saint Vincent and the Grenadines) VIN	Oalex Anderson	0	0	0	0	0	0	0	0
16	MF	(United States) USA	Zev Taublieb	0	0	0	0	0	0	0	0
17	MF	(United States) USA	Jonathan Bolanos	0	0	0	0	0	0	0	0
18	DF	(Ghana) GHA	Wahab Ackwei	0	0	0	0	0	0	0	0
20	GK	(United States) USA	Lee Johnston	0	0	0	0	0	0	0	0
21	MF	(United States) USA	Greg Boehme	0	0	0	0	0	0	0	0
22	DF	(United States) USA	Hassan Pinto	0	0	0	0	0	0	0	0
23	DF	(Sweden) SWE	Victor Falck	0	0	0	0	0	0	0	0
32	FW	(Argentina) ARG	Emiliano Terzaghi	0	0	0	0	0	0	0	0
67	DF	(United States) USA	Devante Dubose	0	0	0	0	0	0	0	0
77	MF	(Ghana) GHA	Charles Boateng	0	0	0	0	0	0	0	0
93	MF	(Italy) ITA	Gianluca Cuomo	0	0	0	0	0	0	0	0
94	GK	(United States) USA	Matt Broomall	0	0	0	0	0	0	0	0
98	MF	(United States) USA	Ryley Kraft	0	0	0	0	0	0	0	0

- Last updated: October 24, 2020
- Source: Soccerway

=== Top scorers ===
Rank	Position	Number	Name	USL1	USL1 Playoffs	U.S. Open Cup	Total
1	FW	15	(Saint Vincent and the Grenadines) Oalex Anderson	1	0	0	1
1	MF	17	(United States) Jonathan Bolanos	1	0	0	1
1	DF	2	(United States) Juan Pablo Monticelli	1	0	0	1

- Last updated: April 20, 2021
- Source: Team Goals

=== Top assists ===
Rank	Position	Number	Name	USL1	USL1 Playoffs	U.S. Open Cup	Total
1	MF	6	(Argentina) Hernán González	1	0	0	1

- Last updated: April 20, 2021
- Source: Team Assists

=== Disciplinary record ===
No.	Pos.	Player	USL1			USL1 Playoffs			U.S. Open Cup			Total		
No.	Pos.	Player	Yellow card	(yellow card) (yellow-red card)	Red card	Yellow card	(yellow card) (yellow-red card)	Red card	Yellow card	(yellow card) (yellow-red card)	Red card	Yellow card	(yellow card) (yellow-red card)	Red card
6	MF	(Argentina) Zacarías Morán	1	0	0	0	0	0	0	0	0	1	0	0
17	MF	(United States) Jonathan Bolanos	1	0	0	0	0	0	0	0	0	1	0	0
Total			2	0	0	0	0	0	0	0	0	2	0	0

- Last updated: April 20, 2021
- Source: Team Discipline
