= Sean Lewis =

Sean Lewis may refer to:

- Sean Lewis (soccer) (born 1992), American soccer goalkeeper
- Sean Lewis (American football) (born 1986), American football coach
