= Jonathan Filipe =

American soccer player

Personal information
- Date of birth: January 10, 1999 (age 27)
- Place of birth: Danbury, Connecticut, United States
- Height: 5 ft 8 in (1.73 m)
- Position: Forward

Youth career
- 2012–2017: Beachside SC
- 2017–2018: New York Red Bulls

College career
Years	Team	Apps	(Gls)
2018–2021	Fairfield Stags	59	(19)

Senior career*
Years	Team	Apps	(Gls)
2019–2021	New York Red Bulls U23	16	(7)
2022	New York Red Bulls II	32	(2)
2023	Hartford Athletic	3	(0)
2023	→ Chattanooga Red Wolves (loan)	13	(2)
2024–2025	Chattanooga Red Wolves	5	(0)
- * Club domestic league appearances and goals as of October 31, 2025

Jonathan Filipe (born January 10, 1999) is an American soccer player.

== Career ==
=== Early career ===
Filipe played high school soccer at Danbury High School, also going on to play club soccer with Beachside SC and the New York Red Bulls academy, where he tallied 10 goals in 24 appearances for the Red Bulls during the 2017–18 season.

In 2018, Filipe attended Fairfield University to play college soccer, going on to make 59 appearances for the Stags, scoring 19 goals and tallying nine assists. He was named a MAAC All-Rookie team in his freshman season.

Filipe also played with USL League Two side New York Red Bulls U23, making 16 appearances and scoring seven goals between 2019 and 2021, with the 2020 season cancelled due to the COVID-19 pandemic.

=== Professional ===
On March 8, 2022, Filipe signed with USL Championship club New York Red Bulls II. He made his professional debut on March 12, 2022, starting against The Miami FC. On August 31, 2022, Felipe scored two goals for New York Red Bulls II in a 3–3 draw versus Hartford Athletic. On 21 July 2023, Filipe was loaned to USL League One side Chattanooga Red Wolves for the remainder of the 2023 season. He signed permanently with Chattanooga on January 3, 2024.
