= Hernán González =

Argentine footballer

Personal information
- Full name: Hugo Hernán González
- Date of birth: 9 March 1992 (age 34)
- Place of birth: Mendoza, Argentina
- Height: 1.84 m (6 ft 0 in)
- Position: Forward

Team information
- Current team: Richmond Kickers
- Number: 19

Senior career*
Years	Team	Apps	(Gls)
2013–2015	Atlas	50	(22)
2015–2016	Comunicaciones	13	(0)
2016–2017	Inter SM		
2017–2018	Douglas Haig	23	(7)
2018–2019	Orense	14	(2)
2019–2020	Magallanes	14	(2)
2020–2021	Juventud Unida	3	(2)
2021	Richmond Kickers	19	(0)
2022–	São Paulo-RS		
- * Club domestic league appearances and goals as of 14 July 2022

Hugo Hernán González (born 9 March 1992) is an Argentine professional footballer who plays as a forward for Sport Club São Paulo.

== Career ==
=== Richmond Kickers ===
In February 2020, González was signed by the Richmond Kickers of USL League One. He made his debut for the club on 17 April 2021 against New England Revolution II.
