= Damian Gallegos =

American soccer player

Personal information
- Full name: Damian Gallegos
- Date of birth: December 14, 2002 (age 23)
- Place of birth: Mechanicsville, Virginia, United States
- Height: 5 ft 8 in (1.73 m)
- Position: Midfielder

Team information
- Current team: VCU Rams
- Number: 20

Youth career
- 2011–2014: Richmond Kickers
- 2014–2021: Richmond United

College career
Years	Team	Apps	(Gls)
2021–	VCU Rams	11	(4)

Senior career*
Years	Team	Apps	(Gls)
2021	Richmond Kickers	1	(0)
- * Club domestic league appearances and goals as of October 7, 2021

Damian Gallegos (born December 14, 2002) is an American college soccer player who plays as a midfielder for Virginia Commonwealth University.

== Career ==
=== Academy and College ===
Gallegos played as part of the Richmond Kickers Youth academy, including stints as a member of the U12 Elite team, and as a member of the travel teams starting at U9. He then went to Richmond United, where he spent six years. In 2021, Gallegos committed to playing college soccer at Virginia Commonwealth University in the fall.

On July 14, 2021, Gallegos signed an academy contract with USL League One side Richmond Kickers. He made his debut for the club on July 21, 2021, appearing as an 80th-minute substitute during a 4–0 loss to North Carolina FC.

On August 26, 2021, Gallegos made his collegiate debut for VCU against Wake Forest. Gallegos started the match, and provided an assist in a 2–0 victory over the Demon Deacons. On August 29, 2021, Gallegos scored his first collegiate goal in a 1–1 draw at North Carolina. During his freshman year, he was named the Atlanta 10 Rookie of the Week twice: on August 30 and October 4.
