= Jackson Khoury =

Association football player (born 2002)

Personal information
- Full name: Jackson Habib Khoury
- Date of birth: 13 October 2002 (age 24)
- Place of birth: Baulkham Hills, New South Wales, Australia
- Height: 1.84 m (6 ft 0 in)
- Position: Winger

Youth career
- –2015: Marconi Stallions
- 2016–2017: Bonnyrigg White Eagles
- 2018: Parramatta FC
- 2018–2020: Sydney United
- 2022–2023: Central Coast Mariners

Senior career*
Years	Team	Apps	(Gls)
2020–2021	Sydney United 58	21	(4)
2022–2023	Central Coast Mariners Academy	21	(2)
2023–2024	South Georgia Tormenta	52	(7)
2025	Tacoma Defiance	25	(5)
2026	Nejmeh	2	(0)

International career^{‡}
2024	Lebanon	1	(0)
- * Club domestic league appearances and goals as of 21 February 2026 ‡ National team caps and goals as of 26 March 2024

Jackson Habib Khoury (Arabic: جاكسون حبيب خوري; born 13 October 2002) is a professional footballer who plays as a winger. Born in Australia, he has played for the Lebanon national team.

== Early life ==
Khoury was born in Baulkham Hills, New South Wales, a western suburb of Sydney, Australia, the eldest of three siblings to an Australian mother and Lebanese father.

== Club career ==
=== Early career ===
Khoury began his senior career with Sydney United 58 in the National Premier Leagues NSW, being named as a breakout star in July 2021. He scored in the Grand Final against Rockdale Ilinden in October 2020 and contributed to United's 4–3 victory in the penalty shootout following a 3–3 draw in regular time.

Khoury later joined Central Coast Mariners Academy, who played in NSW League One, in 2022. He played in the 2–1 Grand Final defeat to St George City at the Sydney United Sports Centre on 3 September 2022. Despite the loss, the Mariners were promoted to the National Premier Leagues.

=== South Georgia Tormenta ===
In February 2023, Khoury signed a two-year contract, with an option to extend for a year, for American club South Georgia Tormenta in the USL League One. After accumulating seven goals and six assists in 31 appearances in his first season, Khoury was named the USL League One Young Player of the Year in November 2023, and, subsequently, Tormenta's Newcomer of the Year Award in December 2023. His 13-goal contributions was the joint third-highest for a player in their debut season in the league's history.

=== Tacoma Defiance ===
On 9 December 2024, it was announced that Khoury would join MLS Next Pro side Tacoma Defiance ahead of their 2025 season. He left the club at the end of the season, following the expiration of his contract.

=== Nejmeh ===
On 18 January 2026, Khoury joined Nejmeh in the Lebanese Premier League.

== International career ==
Eligible to represent Lebanon through his father's side, Khoury was called up into the Lebanese national team for a local training camp in Beirut from 19 December to 28 December 2023. This was in preparation ahead of the 2023 AFC Asian Cup, commencing on 14 January 2024. However, Khoury was not listed in the final squad.

In March 2024, Khoury was recalled to the Lebanese squad for the 2026 FIFA World Cup qualifying matches against his native nation Australia. Khoury made his international debut on 26 March, after missing the initial fixture in Western Sydney Stadium, as a late substitute in a 5–0 defeat to the Socceroos at Canberra Stadium.

== Career statistics ==
=== Club ===
As of match played 5 October 2025

Appearances and goals by club, season and competition
Club	Season	League			National cup (Note: Includes Australia Cup, U.S. Open Cup)		Other		Total	
Club	Season	Division	Apps	Goals	Apps	Goals	Apps	Goals	Apps	Goals
Sydney United 58	2019	NPL NSW	—		1	0	—		1	0
Sydney United 58	2020	NPL NSW	4	3	—		—		4	3
Sydney United 58	2021	NPL NSW	17	1	—		—		17	1
Sydney United 58	Total		21	4	1	0	0	0	22	4
Central Coast Mariners Academy	2022	NSW League One	21	2	—		—		21	2
South Georgia Tormenta	2023	USL League One	31	7	2	0	—		33	7
South Georgia Tormenta	2024	USL League One	21	0	3	0	8 (Note: Appearances in USL Cup)	1	32	1
South Georgia Tormenta	Total		52	7	5	0	8	1	65	8
Tacoma Defiance	2025	MLS Next Pro	25	5	3	0	—		28	5
Career total			119	18	9	0	8	1	136	19

=== International ===
As of match played 26 March 2024

Appearances and goals by national team and year
National team	Year	Apps	Goals
Lebanon	2024	1	0
Total		1	0

== Honours ==
Nejmeh

- Lebanese FA Cup: 2025–26

== See also ==
- List of Lebanon international footballers born outside Lebanon
