= Lucão (footballer, born 2002) =

Brazilian footballer

Personal information
- Full name: Lucas Gabriel Da Silva Teodoro
- Date of birth: 24 May 2002 (age 24)
- Place of birth: Maringá, Brazil
- Height: 1.88 m (6 ft 2 in)
- Position: Centre-back

Team information
- Current team: Gyeongnam
- Number: 39

Youth career
- Ituano
- –2021: Alverca

Senior career*
Years	Team	Apps	(Gls)
2021	Alverca	0	(0)
2021	→ North Texas SC (loan)	8	(0)
2022	União Rondonópolis	0	(0)
2022	→ Cuiabá (loan)	0	(0)
2023	Cuiabá	0	(0)
2023–2024	União Rondonópolis	9	(1)
2024–2025	Academia-MT		
2025	Sergipe		
2025	Democrata		
2026	Serra Branca		
2026–	Gyeongnam	12	(0)
- * Club domestic league appearances and goals as of 6 August 2026

Lucas Gabriel Da Silva Teodoro (born 24 May 2002), known as just Lucão, is a Brazilian footballer who plays for South Korean K League 2 club Gyeongnam.

== Career ==
Lucão played as part of the youth team at Ituano, before moving to Alverca in Portugal.

On 5 August 2021, Lucão joined USL League One side North Texas SC on loan for the remainder of 2021 and the 2022 season. He made his debut on 11 September 2021, appearing as a 79th-minute substitute during a 2–0 loss to South Georgia Tormenta.

In 2022, Lucão played for Cuiabá, probably on loan from União Rondonópolis. Ahead of the 2023 season, he joined Cuiabá permanently.

In the end of 2024, he joined União Rondonópolis again. In the second half of 2024, he joined Academia-MT.
