= Nick Akoto =

American soccer player (born 1998)

Personal information
- Full name: Nicholas Paul-Francois Reza Konan Akoto
- Date of birth: September 16, 1998 (age 28)
- Place of birth: South Miami, Florida, US
- Height: 6 ft 3 in (1.91 m)
- Position: Right-back

Team information
- Current team: Eastleigh

Youth career
- –2017: AFC Wimbledon

College career
Years	Team	Apps	(Gls)
2019–2020	Tennessee Wesleyan Bulldogs	30	(5)
2021–2022	Keiser Seahawks	34	(0)

Senior career*
Years	Team	Apps	(Gls)
2017–2018	Maldon & Tiptree	20	(1)
2018	Whyteleafe	1	(0)
2021	Ocean City Nor'easters	12	(0)
2022	South Georgia Tormenta 2	8	(1)
2023–2024	South Georgia Tormenta	40	(2)
2024–2026	Burton Albion	21	(0)
2026–	Eastleigh	0	(0)
- * Club domestic league appearances and goals as of 13:22, 18 July 2026 (UTC)

Nicholas Paul-Francois Reza Konan Akoto (born September 16, 1998) is an American soccer player who plays as a right-back for National League club Eastleigh.

== Career ==
=== Youth, college, and amateur ===
Akoto played as part of the AFC Wimbledon under-18 side until the summer of 2017. Following his release from Wimbledon, Akoto spent the 2016–17 season with Isthmian League side Maldon & Tiptree, where he made 20 league appearances, scoring a single goal. He started 2018 with non-league side Whyteleafe.

In 2019, Akoto left to play college soccer in the United States. He spent two seasons at Tennessee Wesleyan University, scoring five goals and tallying eight assists in 30 appearances with the Bulldogs. He transferred to Keiser University for the 2021 season, making 17 appearances and adding five assists. In 2022, he made 17 appearances and added two assists for the Seahawks.

In 2021, Akoto appeared for USL League Two side Ocean City Nor'easters, making fourteen appearances across the regular season and playoffs. In 2022, Akoto again played in the USL League Two, this time appearing eight times for South Georgia Tormenta 2 and scoring a single goal.

=== Professional ===
On February 2, 2023, Akoto signed with USL League One side South Georgia Tormenta ahead of their 2023 season. He made his professional debut on March 17, 2023, starting in a 1–0 win over North Carolina FC. His performance earned him a place on the USL League One Team of the Week.

On July 24, 2024, Akoto returned to England to sign a three-year deal with EFL League One side Burton Albion for an undisclosed transfer fee.

On 13 July 2026, Akoto joined National League club Eastleigh having agreed to terminate his contract with Burton Albion.
