= Sean Lewis (soccer) =

American soccer player (born 1992)

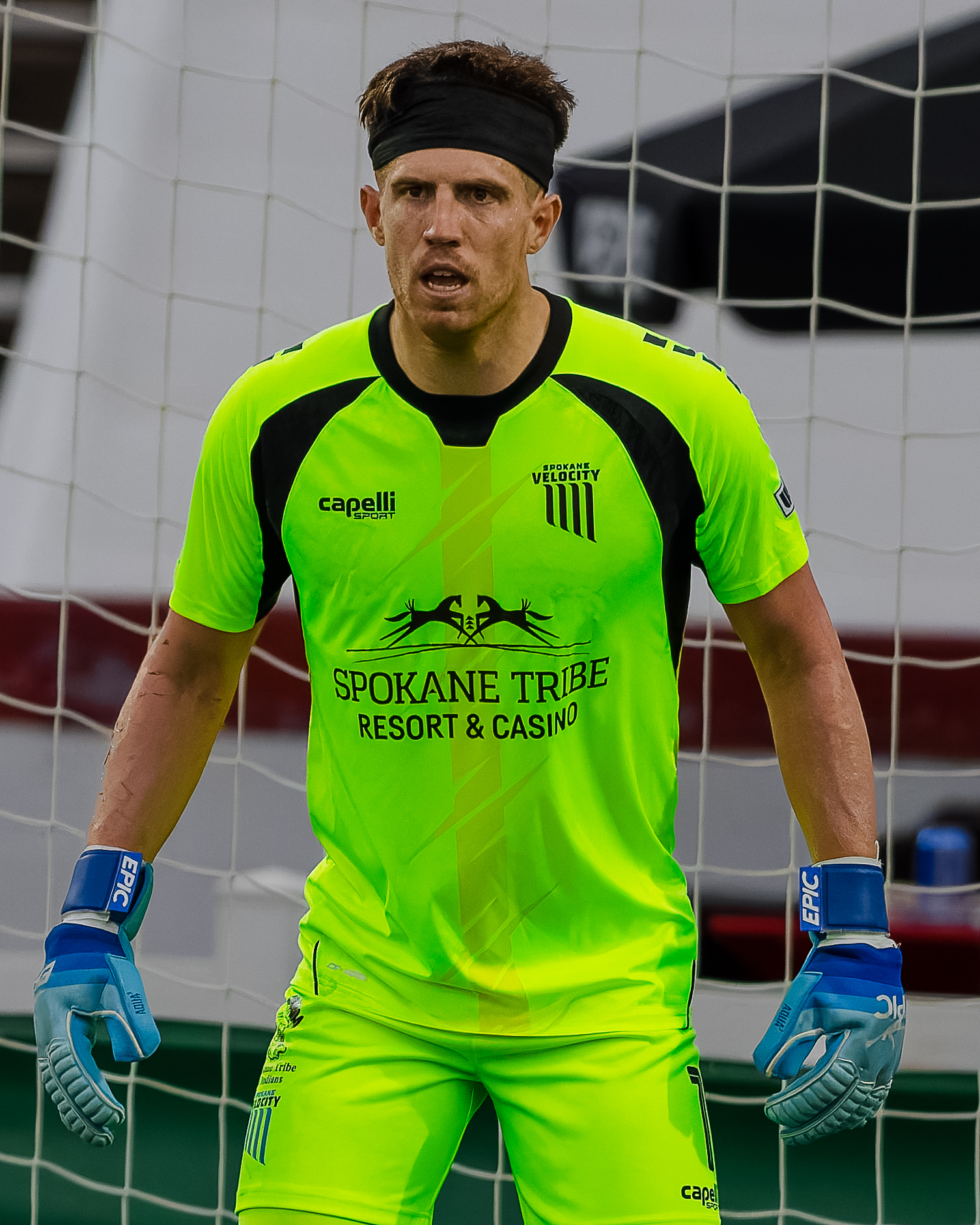
- Lewis with Spokane Velocity in 2026

Personal information
- Full name: Sean Michael Lewis
- Date of birth: April 17, 1992 (age 34)
- Place of birth: Rockford, Michigan, United States
- Height: 1.85 m (6 ft 1 in)
- Position: Goalkeeper

Team information
- Current team: Spokane Velocity
- Number: 1

College career
Years	Team	Apps	(Gls)
2010–2012	Western Michigan Broncos	45	(0)
2013	Oakland Golden Grizzlies	15	(0)

Senior career*
Years	Team	Apps	(Gls)
2014	Panama City Beach Pirates	14	(0)
2015	Olympia Warriors	28	(0)
2016	Jacksonville Armada	11	(0)
2017–2018	Penn FC	14	(0)
2019–2022	FC Tulsa	60	(0)
2022	Indy Eleven	6	(0)
2023–2025	One Knoxville	70	(0)
2026–	Spokane Velocity	23	(0)
- * Club domestic league appearances and goals as of October 31, 2026

Sean Lewis (born April 17, 1992) is an American soccer player who plays as goalkeeper for Spokane Velocity in USL League One.

== Career ==
=== Club ===
In January 2015 Lewis signed for Olympia Warriors of the National Premier League in Australia where he led Olympia to a National Premier League top four finish, Victory League Championship, Summer Cup Championship, and a Victory League Cup Championship . In February 2016, Lewis signed for Jacksonville Armada FC in the NASL.

After two seasons with Penn FC, Lewis joined USL side Tulsa Roughnecks ahead of their 2019 season.

In July 2022, Lewis was traded to Indy Eleven in exchange for defender Noah Powder. He left Indy Eleven following their 2022 season.

Lewis signed with USL League One expansion club One Knoxville on January 24, 2023.

In 2026, Lewis joined Spokane Velocity in USL League One
