= Zacarías Morán =

Argentine footballer (born 1996)

Personal information
- Full name: Dante Zacarías Morán Correa
- Date of birth: 22 February 1996 (age 30)
- Place of birth: Caucete, Argentina
- Height: 1.71 m (5 ft 7 1/2 in)
- Position: Midfielder

Team information
- Current team: Atlético Pulpileño

Youth career
- 2007–2016: River Plate

Senior career*
Years	Team	Apps	(Gls)
2016–2021	River Plate	0	(0)
2018–2019	→ San Martín (loan)	0	(0)
2019–2020	→ Chacarita Juniors (loan)	7	(0)
2021–2024	Richmond Kickers	107	(2)
2025–	Atlético Pulpileño	2	(0)

International career
2013	Argentina U17	5	(0)
- * Club domestic league appearances and goals as of 9 November 2025

Dante Zacarías Morán Correa (born 22 February 1996) is an Argentine professional footballer who plays as a midfielder for Spanish Tercera Federación club Atlético Pulpileño.

== Club career ==
Morán started his career in the system of River Plate, joining in 2007. He first appeared in the senior team in April 2016 as an unused substitute for an Primera División match with Vélez Sarsfield. Morán made his professional debut on 25 May 2017 in a Copa Libertadores group stage victory over Independiente Medellín. In January 2018, after no further appearances for River, Morán completed a loan move to San Martín. He wouldn't feature for the Primera División team's senior side; though did appear on the bench once, for a Copa Argentina match with Villa Dálmine on 20 March 2019.

Upon returning to his parent club, Morán was immediately loaned out to Primera B Nacional's Chacarita Juniors in July 2019. His debut arrived on 24 August in a 2–1 defeat away to Gimnasia y Esgrima, which he played the full duration of. He appeared seven times in total for El Tricolor. He returned to River Plate in early 2020, though wouldn't appear competitively for them before terminating his contract on 10 February 2021.

On 24 February, Morán joined USL League One side Richmond Kickers. After two seasons in which he had 56 appearances, Morán signed a multi-year contract to remain with the club on 17 January 2023.In January 2025, he would leave the club when his contract was declined by the Kickers.

== International career ==
In 2013, Morán represented Argentina at U17 level and won five caps. He was selected in squads for the 2013 South American Under-17 Football Championship and 2013 FIFA U-17 World Cup. He featured four times at the U17 Championship which Argentina won, before making a sole appearance at the U17 World Cup in the United Arab Emirates against Austria.

== Career statistics ==
As of 2 November 2021.

Club statistics
Club	Season	League			Cup		League Cup		Continental		Other		Total	
Club	Season	Division	Apps	Goals	Apps	Goals	Apps	Goals	Apps	Goals	Apps	Goals	Apps	Goals
River Plate	2016	Primera División	0	0	0	0	—		0	0	0	0	0	0
River Plate	2016–17	Primera División	0	0	0	0	—		1 (Note: Appearance(s) in the Copa Libertadores)	0	0	0	1	0
River Plate	2017–18	Primera División	0	0	0	0	—		0	0	0	0	0	0
River Plate	2018–19	Primera División	0	0	0	0	0	0	0	0	0	0	0	0
River Plate	2019–20	Primera División	0	0	0	0	0	0	0	0	0	0	0	0
River Plate	2020–21	Primera División	0	0	0	0	0	0	0	0	0	0	0	0
River Plate	Total		0	0	0	0	0	0	1	0	0	0	1	0
San Martín (loan)	2017–18	Primera División	0	0	0	0	—		—		0	0	0	0
San Martín (loan)	2018–19	Primera División	0	0	0	0	—		—		0	0	0	0
San Martín (loan)	Total		0	0	0	0	—		—		0	0	0	0
Chacarita Juniors (loan)	2019–20	Primera B Nacional	7	0	0	0	—		—		0	0	7	0
Richmond Kickers	2021	USL League One	25	1	0	0	—		—		0	0	25	1
Career total			32	1	0	0	—		1	0	0	0	33	1

== Honours ==
Argentina U17

- South American Under-17 Football Championship: 2013
