= João Silva (footballer, born 1997) =

Brazilian footballer

Personal information
- Full name: João Pedro Gomiero da Silva
- Date of birth: 20 June 1997 (age 29)
- Place of birth: São Paulo, Brazil
- Height: 1.78 m (5 ft 10 in)
- Position: Midfielder

Team information
- Current team: Northern Virginia FC
- Number: 19

College career
Years	Team	Apps	(Gls)
2015–2016	Campbellsville Tigers	15	(4)
2017–2018	Coker Cobras	25	(3)

Senior career*
Years	Team	Apps	(Gls)
2019	North Carolina Fusion U23	9	(1)
2019	Stumptown Athletic	3	(1)
2022	North Carolina Fusion	17	(10)
2023–2024	Richmond Kickers	41	(6)
2026–	Northern Virginia FC		
- * Club domestic league appearances and goals as of November 23, 2024

João Pedro Gomiero da Silva (born 20 June 1997) is a Brazilian footballer who plays as a midfielder for USL League Two club Northern Virginia FC.

== Career ==
=== Youth and college ===
Gomiero played youth soccer for his secondary school, Colegio Singular in his hometown of São Paulo. After graduating in 2015, he moved to the United States to play college soccer for Campbellsville University. There, he made 15 appearances, scoring 4 goals, and providing 3 assists. In 2017, he transferred to Coker University and played there for two seasons, where he had 3 goals, and 2 assists in 25 total appearances for the school.

=== Senior ===
Upon graduated college, Gomerio played in USL League Two for North Carolina Fusion, where he made [x] total appearances, scoring [x] goals during his first stint there. In 2020, Gomerio joined National Independent Soccer Association side, Stumptown Athletic, where he made [x] appearances with the club. In 2022, he returned to North Carolina Fusion where he captained the side. During the 2022 USL League Two season, the Fusion earned a 11-1-2 record to outright win the South Atlantic Division.In the 2022 season, Silva (competing as João Gomiero) captained the North Carolina Fusion U23 to the South Atlantic Division title. In the playoffs, the Fusion reached the National Semi-Finals. Gomiero led the team with 10 goals and one assist across 17 matches. He ended the season as a member of the 2022 League Two All-League Team.

On December 13, 2022, he signed a professional contract to join the Richmond Kickers in USL League One. On March 18, 2023, he came on in the 67th minute of a 0–0 draw against Charlotte Independence marking his first professional match.

On 1 December 2024, Gomeiro left the club when his contract expired.

On 1 January 2026, Gomeiro signed for Northern Virginia FC in USL League Two.
