= Luke Pavone =

American soccer player

Personal information
- Full name: Luke Matthew Pavone
- Date of birth: March 29, 1995 (age 31)
- Place of birth: Rochester, New York, United States
- Height: 5 ft 10 in (1.78 m)
- Position: Defender

College career
Years	Team	Apps	(Gls)
2013–2014	UMass Minutemen	27	(1)
2015–2017	Buffalo State Bengals	38	(19)

Senior career*
Years	Team	Apps	(Gls)
2015	FC Buffalo		
2016–2018	Rochester Lancers		
2018	Hapoel Petah Tikva		
2019–2023	Richmond Kickers	61	(1)
2024–2025	Phuket Andaman	0	(0)
- * Club domestic league appearances and goals as of August 14, 2024

Luke Matthew Pavone (born March 29, 1995) is an American soccer player who most recently played as a midfielder for Thai club Phuket Andaman.

== Career ==
Pavone signed with the Richmond Kickers ahead of the 2019 season. After five seasons, he was released by the Kickers.
