= Michael Hornsby =

German footballer (born 1998)

Personal information
- Date of birth: 23 November 1998 (age 27)
- Place of birth: Biberach an der Riss, Germany
- Height: 1.83 m (6 ft 0 in)
- Position: Defender

Team information
- Current team: Malvern City

Youth career
- SC Freiburg
- –2017: FV Ravensburg

College career
Years	Team	Apps	(Gls)
2017–2019	Queens Royals	54	(6)
2020–2021	UNC Wilmington Seahawks	26	(0)

Senior career*
Years	Team	Apps	(Gls)
2018	Chattanooga FC	1	(0)
2021	South Georgia Tormenta 2	13	(0)
2022	Central Valley Fuego	27	(0)
2023	Richmond Kickers	28	(1)
2024	Christchurch United	10	(4)
2024	Port Melbourne SC		
2025–	Malvern City		
- * Club domestic league appearances and goals as of 13:39, 17 December 2025 (UTC)

Michael Hornsby (born 23 November 1998) is a German professional footballer who plays as a defender for Malvern City in Victorian Premiere league 2

== Career ==
=== Youth, College & Amateur ===
Hornsby attended Pestalozzi-Gymnasium Biberach, whilst also playing as part of the SC Freiburg academy and later the FV Ravensburg academy, the former of which he competed with for a single season.

In 2017, Hornsby moved to the United States to play college soccer at Queens University of Charlotte. In three seasons with then Royals, Hornsby made 54 appearances, scoring six goals and tallying 13 assists. In those three seasons, Hornsby was a three-time First-Team All-SAC performer, also earning NCCSIA All-State honors three times, including a pair of First-Team commendations, and was a two-time pick on United Soccer Coaches All-Region team.

In 2020, Hornsby transferred to the University of North Carolina Wilmington, going to make 26 appearances for the Seahawks. Here he was a Third-Team All-Colonial Athletic Association selection in the 2020–21 season. Following the 2021 season, he was a Second-Team All-Colonial Athletic Association selection, and received Third-Team All-Atlantic Region honors by the United Soccer Coaches.

During his college career, Hornsby also played a single game for NPSL side Chattanooga FC during their 2018 season. In 2021, Hornsby competed with USL League Two's South Georgia Tormenta 2, where he finished the regular season with six assists in 13 appearances.

=== Professional ===
Hornsby signed with Central Valley Fuego on 22 March 2022, ahead of their inaugural season in USL League One. He made his debut for the club on 23 April 2022, starting in a 3–0 loss to Union Omaha.

Ahead of the 2022 season, Hornsby signed with USL League One side Richmond Kickers.
