= 2021 Union Omaha season =

Union Omaha
2021 season
- Head coach: Jay Mims
- USL League One: 1st (first regular season title)
- USL1 Playoffs: Winners (first championship)
- Top goalscorer: League: All: Greg Hurst (14 goals)
- Highest home attendance: 5,221 vs. GVL (11/20)
- Lowest home attendance: 2,722 vs. TOR (9/11)
- Average home league attendance: 3,496
- Biggest win: OMA 6-1 TUC (11/13)
- Biggest defeat: -1 goal (5 times)
Home colors	Away colors

The 2021 Union Omaha season was the second season in the soccer team's history, and their second season in the third division of American soccer, USL League One. Union Omaha played the majority of their home games at Werner Park, located in Papillion, Nebraska, United States, with one game played at Creighton University's Morrison Stadium.

Union Omaha finished the regular season in first place, finishing with the league's best goal difference, earning home field advantage and a first-round bye in the USL League One Playoffs. Union Omaha finished the season winning their first ever championship, beating defending champion Greenville Triumph SC 3–0 in the final.

== Roster ==
Following the completion of Union Omaha's inaugural season, head coach Jay Mims announced 14 players would return for the 2021 season. The team's first new signings were announced on January 22, as Conor Doyle and Greg Hurst were signed as free agents from the Chattanooga Red Wolves. Goalkeeper Kevin Piedrahita and defender Blake Malone joined the team as a free agent and on loan, respectively, before the start of training camp.

As of August 11, 2021

No.	Position	Nation	Player
2	MF	BIH	Emir Alihodžić
3	DF	ESP	Damià Viader
4	DF	USA	Jaime Ponce
5	MF	KEN	Tobias Otieno
7	FW	USA	Ethan Vanacore-Decker
8	MF	USA	John Murphy
9	FW	SCO	Greg Hurst
10	MF	BRA	Nicolas Firmino
11	FW	USA	Evan Conway
12	MF	USA	Austin Panchot
13	DF	USA	Daltyn Knutson
14	MF	SLV	Christian Molina
15	FW	CMR	Elma N'For
16	DF	AUT	Jake Crull
17	MF	USA	JP Scearce
18	DF	USA	Blake Malone (on loan from Orange County SC)
19	FW	PUR	Ricardo Rivera
20	MF	USA	Devin Boyce
22	MF	USA	Conor Doyle
24	GK	GHA	Rashid Nuhu
25	DF	COD	Ferrety Sousa
28	DF	GHA	Illal Osumanu
30	MF	USA	Yoskar Galván-Mercado
33	GK	USA	Kevin Piedrahita

== Competitions ==
=== Exhibitions ===
March 19, 2021 Preseason 1	Minnesota United FC	1–1	Union Omaha	Blaine, Minnesota
				Stadium: National Sports Center

March 24, 2021 Preseason 2	Phoenix Rising FC	1–2	Union Omaha	Chandler, Arizona
12:00 PM MST	Dadashov 33'	PHX Report	Scearce 41'; Hurst 53'	Stadium: Wild Horse Pass Stadium

March 27, 2021 Preseason 3	Phoenix Rising FC	1–2	Union Omaha	Chandler, Arizona
11:00 AM MST	Rodríguez 42'	PHX Report	Vanacore-Decker 69'; N'For 90+'	Stadium: Wild Horse Pass Stadium

April 17, 2021 Preseason 4	Union Omaha	2–1	Sporting Kansas City II	Papillion, Nebraska
2:00 PM CST	Scearce 25', 63'	SKC II Report	Rešetar 34'	Stadium: Werner Park

August 4, 2021 Midseason 1	Union Omaha	v	Bellevue University	Papillion, Nebraska
6:00 PM CDT				Stadium: Werner Park

=== USL League One ===
==== Standings ====
Pos	Team	Pld	W	D	L	GF	GA	GD	Pts	Qualification
1	Union Omaha (C, X)	28	14	9	5	44	22	+22	51	Qualification for the semi-finals
2	Greenville Triumph SC	28	12	9	7	36	29	+7	45	Qualification for the semi-finals
3	Chattanooga Red Wolves SC	28	11	11	6	37	29	+8	44	Qualification for the play-offs
4	FC Tucson	28	11	7	10	44	42	+2	40	Qualification for the play-offs
5	Richmond Kickers	28	11	7	10	35	36	−1	40	Qualification for the play-offs

Source: USL League One
Rules for classification: 1) points; 2) total wins; 3) total goal differential; 4) total goals scored; 5) points earned against top four Conference finishers; 6) disciplinary points; 7) drawing of lots.
(C) Champions; (X) Regular Season Champion

==== Results summary ====
Overall								Home						Away					
Pld	W	D	L	GF	GA	GD	Pts	W	D	L	GF	GA	GD	W	D	L	GF	GA	GD
28	14	9	5	44	22	+22	51	7	4	3	23	12	+11	7	5	2	21	10	+11

Source: USL League One

==== Results by round ====
Round	1	2	3	4	5	6	7	8	9	10	11	12	13	14	15	16	17	18	19	20	21	22	23	24	25	26	27	28
Stadium	H	A	A	A	A	A	A	H	A	H	H	H	A	H	A	A	H	A	H	A	H	A	H	H	H	H	H	A
Result	W	W	W	D	L	D	W	W	D	W	D	D	W	D	W	L	D	W	W	D	L	W	W	L	W	L	W	D
Position	3	2	2	2	2	3	1	1	1	1	1	1	1	1	1	2	2	1	1	2	2	1	1	1	1	1	1	1

Source: USL League One
A = Away; H = Home; W = Win; D = Draw; L = Loss

==== Match results ====
April 24, 2021 1	Union Omaha	2–0	South Georgia Tormenta FC	Papillion, NE
6:00 PM CDT	Conway 22'; Boyce (yellow card) 53'; Nuhu (yellow card) 69'; Hurst 83', (yellow card) 88'; Scearce (yellow card) 85'	Report	Eckenrode (yellow card) 49'; Phelps (yellow card) 57'; Liadi (yellow card) 69'; Billhardt (yellow card) 81'	Stadium: Werner Park; Attendance: 2,786; Referee: Mark Allatin

May 7, 2021 2	Fort Lauderdale CF	0–2	Union Omaha	Fort Lauderdale, FL
6:30 PM CDT	Saavedra (yellow card) 66'	Report	Conway 31'; Alihodžić (yellow card) 47'; Viader 71'	Stadium: DRV PNK Stadium; Referee: Gabriele Giusti

May 12, 2021 3	New England Revolution II	0–1	Union Omaha	Foxborough, MA
4:00 PM CDT	J. Buck (yellow card) 26'; Presley (yellow card) 27'; Dulysse (yellow card) 38'	Report	Scearce (yellow card) 52'; Hurst 84', (yellow card) 90+1'	Stadium: Gillette Stadium; Attendance: 150; Referee: Adam Kilpatrick

May 16, 2021 4	Greenville Triumph SC	1–1	Union Omaha	Greenville, SC
3:00 PM CDT	Lomis 35'; Pilato (yellow card) 37'	Report	Firmino 59', (yellow card) 84'; Scearce (yellow card) 77'	Stadium: Legacy Early College Field; Attendance: 2,058; Referee: Elton Garcia

May 26, 2021 5	Forward Madison FC	1–0	Union Omaha	Madison, WI
7:00 PM CDT	Sukow 58'; Fuson (yellow card) 90'	Report	Knutson (yellow card) 16'; Sousa (yellow card) 69'	Stadium: Breese Stevens Field; Attendance: 1,919; Referee: Nabil Bensalah

June 2, 2021 6	Toronto FC II	1–1	Union Omaha	Casa Grande, AZ
9:00 PM CDT	Thompson 49'; Franklin (yellow card) 67'	Report	Firmino (yellow card) 37'; Sousa (yellow card) 52'; Knutson 73'	Stadium: Grande Sports World; Referee: Jervis Atagana

June 6, 2021 7	Forward Madison	1–2	Union Omaha	Madison, WI
5:00 PM CDT	Keegan 35'; Molloy (yellow card) 66'; Fernandes (yellow card) 90+1'	Report	Allen 7' (o.g.); Hurst (yellow card) 30'; Alihodžić 51'; Alihodžić (yellow card) 59'	Stadium: Breese Stevens Field; Attendance: 2,195; Referee: Laura Chambers

June 12, 2021 8	Union Omaha	4–2	New England Revolution II	Papillion, NE
7:00 PM CDT	Sousa (yellow card) 5'; Hurst 21', 45+1', 47'; Boyce 77'; Panchot (yellow card) 84'	Report	Knighton (yellow card) 10'; Presley 23'; Tsicoulias 63'	Stadium: Werner Park; Attendance: 3,677; Referee: Velimir Stefanovic

June 19, 2021 9	Richmond Kickers	1–1	Union Omaha	Richmond, VA
5:30 PM CDT	Terzaghi (yellow card) 57'; Otieno 76' (o.g.); Anderson (yellow card) 80'	Report	Sousa 31', (yellow card) 75'; Vanacore-Decker (yellow card) 64'; Otieno (yellow card) 73'	Stadium: City Stadium; Attendance: 2,009; Referee: John Matto

June 26, 2021 10	Union Omaha	1–0	FC Tucson	Papillion, NE
7:00 PM CDT	Hurst 6'; Otieno (yellow card) 42'; Knutson (yellow card) 78'; Firmino (yellow card) 90+3'	Report	Ferriol (yellow card) 45+2'; Corfe (yellow card) 61'; Fox (yellow card) 90+7'	Stadium: Werner Park; Attendance: 3,315; Referee: Melvin Rivas

July 3, 2021 11	Union Omaha	1–1	Chattanooga Red Wolves SC	Papillion, NE
8:00 PM CDT	Hurst 36'; Doyle (yellow card) 45+1'; Scearce (yellow card) 54', (red card) 55'	Report	España (yellow card) 24'; Ruiz (yellow card) 31'; García (yellow card) 81'; Hernández 90+1'	Stadium: Werner Park; Attendance: 3,880; Referee: Samantha Martinez

July 16, 2021 12	Union Omaha	1–1	Forward Madison FC	Papillion, NE
7:00 PM CDT	Boyce 11'; N'For (yellow card) 31'	Report	Barriga Toyama (yellow card) 32'; Gebhard (yellow card) 60'; Tobin 67'; Fernandes (yellow card) 74'	Stadium: Werner Park; Attendance: 3,304; Referee: Kevin Fikar

July 24, 2021 13	FC Tucson	1–2	Union Omaha	Tucson, AZ
9:00 PM CDT	Bedoya (yellow card) 49'; Dennis (yellow card) 67'; Doyle 74' (o.g.); Fox (yellow card) 90+4'	Report	Sousa (yellow card) 23'; Viader 44'; Hurst 51'; Murphy (yellow card) 84'	Stadium: Kino North Stadium; Attendance: 715; Referee: Gerald Flores

July 31, 2021 14	Union Omaha	1–1	North Texas SC	Papillion, NE
7:00 PM CDT	Hurst 20'; Crull (yellow card) 65'; Boyce (yellow card) 79'	Report	Kamungo 49'; Waldeck (yellow card) 51'; Almaguer (yellow card) 63'; Kazu (yellow card) 66'	Stadium: Werner Park; Attendance: 3,722; Referee: Chris Ruska

August 7, 2021 15	Union Omaha	P–P	Forward Madison FC	Papillion, NE
7:00 PM CDT				Stadium: Werner Park
Note: Match postponed due to severe weather

August 14, 2021 15	FC Tucson	0–1	Union Omaha	Tucson, AZ
9:00 PM CDT	Knox (yellow card) 58'	Report	Kone 19' (o.g.); Otieno (yellow card) 59'; Viader (yellow card) 75'; Doyle (yellow card) 80'	Stadium: Kino North Stadium; Attendance: 859; Referee: Ricardo Fierro

August 21, 2021 16	Chattanooga Red Wolves SC	1–0	Union Omaha	Chattanooga, TN
6:00 PM CDT	Capozucchi (yellow card) 28'; Ricketts (yellow card) 33'; Navarro (yellow card) 67'; Carrera (yellow card) 75'; Ruiz 79'	Report	Doyle (yellow card) 36'; Viader (yellow card) 76'	Stadium: CHI Memorial Stadium; Attendance: 2,149; Referee: Joshua Belk

August 28, 2021 17	Union Omaha	0–0	North Texas SC	Papillion, NE
7:00 PM CDT	Otieno (yellow card) 50'; Malone (yellow card) 90+2'	Report	Maldonado (yellow card) 23'; Smith (yellow card) 26'; Gomes (yellow card) 31'; Ferri (yellow card) 68'	Stadium: Werner Park; Attendance: 3,311; Referee: Karen Callado

September 4, 2021 18	North Carolina FC	0–3	Union Omaha	Cary, NC
6:00 CDT	Martinez (yellow card) 24'; Flick (yellow card) 39'; McGuire (yellow card) 52'; Jackson (yellow card) 70'	Report	Viader 7', 53' (pen.); Alihodžić (yellow card) 68'; Rivera 85'	Stadium: WakeMed Soccer Park; Referee: William Steffen

September 11, 2021 19	Union Omaha	2–1	Toronto FC II	Papillion, NE
7:00 PM CDT	Boyce 6'; Scearce (yellow card) 21', (goal) 71'; Hurst (yellow card) 45+4'	Report	Carlini (yellow card) 39'; Singh 53'; Petrasso (yellow card) 59'; Altobelli (yellow card) 88'	Stadium: Werner Park; Attendance: 2,722; Referee: Adorae Monroy

September 19, 2021 20	North Texas SC	2–2	Union Omaha	Arlington, TX
6:00 PM CDT	ElMedkhar 18'; Ferri (yellow card) 30'; Vargas 53', (yellow card) 90'	Report	Viader 11', (yellow card) 76'; Hurst (yellow card) 58'; Conway 81'	Stadium: Globe Life Park; Attendance: 603; Referee: Benjamin Meyer

September 25, 2021 21	Union Omaha	0–1	FC Tucson	Omaha, NE
7:00 PM CDT	Doyle (yellow card) 11'; Alihodžić (yellow card) 32'	Report	Dennis 7' (pen.); Mastrantonio (yellow card) 51'; Adams (yellow card) 56'; Calixtro (yellow card) 76'; Kone (yellow card) 81'; Schenfeld (yellow card) 87'	Stadium: Morrison Stadium; Attendance: 3,741; Referee: Jervis Atagana

October 1, 2021 22	South Georgia Tormenta FC	0–4	Union Omaha	Statesboro, GA
7:00 PM CDT	Micaletto (yellow card) 2'; Nus (yellow card) 51'; Jackson (yellow card) 57'; Candela (yellow card) 76'	Report	Conway 5', 40', 71'; Viader 66'; Osumanu (yellow card) 77'	Stadium: Eagle Field; Attendance: 2,045; Referee: Izlen Peksenar

October 6, 2021 23	Union Omaha	4–1	Fort Lauderdale CF	Papillion, NE
7:00 PM CDT	Conway 35'; Hurst 43', 58'; Boyce 49'; Doyle (yellow card) 70'	Report		Stadium: Werner Park; Attendance: 3,126; Referee: Melvin Rivas

October 9, 2021 24	Union Omaha	0–1	Greenville Triumph SC	Papillion, NE
6:00 PM CDT	Doyle (yellow card) 72'; Otieno (yellow card) 78'	Report	Lomis 12'; Booth (yellow card) 69'; Hemmings (yellow card) 88'	Stadium: Werner Park; Attendance: 3,884; Referee: Greg Dopka

October 16, 2021 25	Union Omaha	4–1	North Carolina FC	Papillion, NE
6:00 PM CDT	Conway 2', 18', 57'; Alihodžić 25'	Report	Mbaye 15'; Blanco (yellow card) 45+3'; Frame (yellow card) 68'	Stadium: Werner Park; Attendance: 3,197; Referee: Nabil Bensalah

October 20, 2021 26	Union Omaha	1–2	Forward Madison FC	Papillion, NE
7:00 PM CDT	Conway (yellow card) 32'; Hurst 89' (pen.)	Report	Allen (yellow card) 32'; Trimmingham 53', 58', (yellow card) 58'; Rad (yellow card) 76'	Stadium: Werner Park; Attendance: 2,405; Referee: Abdou Ndiaye
Note: Match was originally scheduled for August 7

October 23, 2021 27	Union Omaha	2–0	Richmond Kickers	Papillion, NE
6:00 PM CDT	Hurst (yellow card) 34', (goal) 88'; Otieno 85', (yellow card) 90+4'; Sousa (yellow card) 90'	Report	Bolduc (yellow card) 30'; Bolanos (yellow card) 77'; Morán (yellow card) 84'	Stadium: Werner Park; Attendance: 2,943; Referee: Luis Arroyo

October 30, 2021 28	North Texas SC	1–1	Union Omaha	Arlington, TX
7:30 PM CDT	Kamungo 35'; Avayevu (yellow card) 83'	Report	Firmino 90+1'	Stadium: Globe Life Park; Attendance: 821; Referee: Eric Tattersall

==== USL League One Playoffs ====
November 13, 2021 Semifinal	Union Omaha	6–1	FC Tucson	Papillion, NE
4:00 PM CST	Conway 3', 31'; Boyce (yellow card) 32', (goal) 54'; Crull (yellow card) 34'; Viader 49'; Panchot 70'; Alihodžić 83'	Report	Schenfeld (yellow card) 30', (red card) 32'; Dennis (yellow card) 44', (goal) 63'; Ferriol (yellow card) 66'	Stadium: Werner Park; Attendance: 3,607; Referee: Michael Radchuk

November 20, 2021 Final	Union Omaha	3–0	Greenville Triumph	Papillion, NE
4:00 PM CST	Conway 7', (yellow card) 11' (yellow-red card) 77'; Hurst 43'; Sousa (yellow card) 62'; Viader (yellow card) 63'; Otieno 90+2'	Report	Hemmings (yellow card) 65'; Lee (yellow card) 72'	Stadium: Werner Park; Attendance: 5,221; Referee: Kevin Broadley

== Statistics ==
=== Appearances and goals ===
Numbers after plus–sign (+) denote appearances as a substitute.

No.	Pos	Nat	Player	Total		USL-1	
No.	Pos	Nat	Player	Apps	Goals	Apps	Goals
2	MF	(Bosnia and Herzegovina) BIH	Emir Alihodžić	29	3	14+15	3
3	DF	(Spain) ESP	Damià Viader	30	7	29+1	7
4	DF	(United States) USA	Jaime Ponce	1	0	1+0	0
5	MF	(Kenya) KEN	Tobias Otieno	25	2	16+9	2
7	FW	(United States) USA	Ethan Vanacore-Decker	11	0	7+4	0
8	MF	(United States) USA	John Murphy	8	0	0+8	0
9	FW	(Scotland) SCO	Greg Hurst	30	14	27+3	14
10	MF	(Brazil) BRA	Nicolas Firmino	25	2	9+16	2
11	FW	(United States) USA	Evan Conway	18	13	15+3	13
12	MF	(United States) USA	Austin Panchot	16	1	3+13	1
13	DF	(United States) USA	Daltyn Knutson	23	1	22+1	1
14	MF	(El Salvador) SLV	Christian Molina	9	0	1+8	0
15	FW	(Cameroon) CMR	Elma N'For	15	0	5+10	0
16	DF	(Austria) AUT	Jake Crull	23	0	19+4	0
17	MF	(United States) USA	JP Scearce	29	1	27+2	1
18	DF	(United States) USA	Blake Malone	13	0	7+6	0
19	FW	(Puerto Rico) PUR	Ricardo Rivera	7	1	1+6	1
20	MF	(United States) USA	Devin Boyce	29	5	27+2	5
22	MF	(United States) USA	Conor Doyle	30	0	28+2	0
24	GK	(Ghana) GHA	Rashid Nuhu	26	0	26+0	0
25	DF	(Democratic Republic of the Congo) COD	Ferrety Sousa	29	1	27+2	1
28	DF	(Ghana) GHA	Illal Osumanu	17	0	15+2	0
30	MF	(United States) USA	Yoskar Galvan-Mercado	2	0	0+2	0
33	GK	(United States) USA	Kevin Piedrahita	4	0	4+0	0

- Last updated: November 21, 2021
- Source: USL League One

=== Disciplinary record ===
No.	Pos.	Player	USL1			Total		
No.	Pos.	Player	Booked	(yellow card) (yellow-red card)	Sent off (straight red)	Booked	(yellow card) (yellow-red card)	Sent off (straight red)
2	MF	(Bosnia and Herzegovina) Emir Alihodžić	4	0	0	4	0	0
3	DF	(Spain) Damià Viader	4	0	0	4	0	0
4	DF	(United States) Jaime Ponce	0	0	0	0	0	0
5	MF	(Kenya) Tobias Otieno	6	0	0	6	0	0
7	FW	(United States) Ethan Vanacore-Decker	1	0	0	1	0	0
8	MF	(United States) John Murphy	1	0	0	1	0	0
9	FW	(Scotland) Greg Hurst	6	0	0	6	0	0
10	MF	(Brazil) Nicolas Firmino	3	0	0	3	0	0
11	FW	(United States) Evan Conway	1	1	0	1	1	0
12	MF	(United States) Austin Panchot	1	0	0	1	0	0
13	DF	(United States) Daltyn Knutson	2	0	0	2	0	0
14	MF	(El Salvador) Christian Molina	0	0	0	0	0	0
15	FW	(Cameroon) Elma N'For	1	0	0	1	0	0
16	DF	(Austria) Jake Crull	2	0	0	2	0	0
17	MF	(United States) JP Scearce	5	0	1	5	0	1
18	DF	(United States) Blake Malone	1	0	0	1	0	0
19	FW	(Puerto Rico) Ricardo Rivera	0	0	0	0	0	0
20	MF	(United States) Devin Boyce	3	0	0	3	0	0
22	MF	(United States) Conor Doyle	6	0	0	6	0	0
24	GK	(Ghana) Rashid Nuhu	1	0	0	1	0	0
25	DF	(Democratic Republic of the Congo) Ferrety Sousa	7	0	0	7	0	0
28	DF	(Ghana) Illal Osumanu	1	0	0	1	0	0
30	MF	(United States) Yoskar Galvan-Mercado	0	0	0	0	0	0
33	GK	(United States) Kevin Piedrahita	0	0	0	0	0	0
Total			56	1	1	56	1	1

- Last updated: November 21, 2021
- Source: USL League One
