= 2022 Tormenta FC season =

Tormenta FC
2022 season
- Owner: Van Tassell Group
- Head coach: Ian Cameron
- Stadium: Erik Russell Park & Optim Health System Field
- USL1 Playoffs: Champions
- U.S. Open Cup: Round of 32
- Top goalscorer: League: Multiple players (2 goals); All: Arthur Bosua (3 goals)
- Highest home attendance: 2,000 vs. RIC (10/2); 3,045 vs. CRW (11/06)
- Lowest home attendance: 573 vs. NCF (7/22)
- Average home league attendance: 1,041
- Biggest win: BMH 0–2 TRM (4/19, USOC); GVL 0–2 TRM (4/23); TUC 0–2 TRM (4/30); GVL 1–3 TRM (7/30); CV 0–2 TRM (8/27); CLT 0–2 TRM (8/31); TRM 3–1 NCO (9/10); TRM 2–0 CHA (10/15)
- Biggest defeat: TRM 0–4 CV (5/21)

The 2022 Tormenta FC season was the club's seventh season of existence, and their fourth season as a professional club, all of which have been spent in the third tier of American soccer in USL League One. Tormenta FC enter this season following an 11th-place finish the previous season. This will be the club's first season in their new stadium, Optim Health System Field, after spending previous seasons at Eagle Field on the campus of Georgia Southern University.

== Club ==
=== Roster ===
As of March 31, 2022

No.	Pos.	Nation	Player
1	GK	CHI	Pablo Jara
2	DF	USA	Ian Antley
3	DF	USA	Owen Green
4	DF	USA	Lars Eckenrode
5	DF	AUS	Joshua Phelps
7	FW	GHA	Kingsford Adjei
8	MF	BRA	Gabriel Cabral
9	FW	ENG	Kazaiah Sterling
10	MF	GER	Adrian Billhardt
11	FW	ENG	Jamil Roberts
12	DF	BLZ	Deshawon Nembhard
14	FW	USA	Alex Morrell
18	MF	USA	Josue Soto
21	MF	AUS	Chris Heckenberg
23	DF	ENG	Curtis Thorn
25	DF	USA	Jake Dengler
27	FW	RSA	Arthur Bosua
29	DF	USA	Brittain Gottlieb
30	GK	USA	Jamie Boegel
47	MF	USA	Barry Sharifi
55	MF	KEN	Tobias Otieno
99	GK	USA	TJ Bush

USL Academy Contract

== Competitions ==
=== Exhibitions ===
February 26, 2022 1	Atlanta United 2	0–1	Tormenta FC	Marietta, Georgia
3:00 PM EST		Report		Stadium: Children's Healthcare of Atlanta Training Ground

March 5, 2022 2	Tampa Bay Rowdies	1–1	Tormenta FC	St. Petersburg, Florida
7:00 PM EST		Report		Stadium: Al Lang Stadium

March 20, 2022 3	Tormenta FC	1–1	Mercer University	Statesboro, Georgia
3:00 PM EDT		Report		Stadium: Eagle Field

=== USL League One ===
==== Standings ====
Pos	Team	Pld	W	L	T	GF	GA	GD	Pts	Qualification
1	Richmond Kickers (X)	30	14	7	9	54	35	+19	51	Qualification for the semi-finals
2	Greenville Triumph SC	30	12	8	10	40	38	+2	46	Qualification for the semi-finals
3	Tormenta FC (C)	30	12	9	9	42	40	+2	45	Qualification for the play-offs
4	Chattanooga Red Wolves SC	30	12	11	7	52	39	+13	43	Qualification for the play-offs
5	Union Omaha	30	10	7	13	34	33	+1	43	Qualification for the play-offs

Source: USL League One
Rules for classification: 1) points; 2) total wins; 3) total goal differential; 4) total goals scored; 5) points earned against top four Conference finishers; 6) disciplinary points; 7) drawing of lots.
(C) Champions; (X) Regular Season Champion

==== Match results ====
April 2, 2022 1	Tormenta FC	0–1	North Carolina FC	Statesboro, Georgia
7:30 PM EDT	Bosua (yellow card) 6'; Soto (yellow card) 79'	Report	Tahir (yellow card) 1'; Anderson (yellow card) 18'; McLaughlin 22'; Martinez (yellow card) 78' (yellow-red card) 79'	Stadium: Eagle Field; Attendance: 1,208; Referee: Kyle Johnston

April 16, 2022 2	Tormenta FC	0–0	Union Omaha	Statesboro, Georgia
6:00 PM EDT	Billhardt (yellow card) 51'; Nembhard (yellow card) 66'; Roberts (yellow card) 67'; Phelps (red card) 73'	Report	Knutson (yellow card) 15'; Scearce (yellow card) 20'; Malcolm (yellow card) 80'	Stadium: Eagle Field; Attendance: 978; Referee: Izlen Peksenar

April 23, 2022 3	Greenville Triumph	0–2	Tormenta FC	Greenville, South Carolina
7:00 PM EDT	Walker (yellow card) 43'	Report	Adjei 11'; Phelps (yellow card) 32'; Bosua 40'; Cabral (yellow card) 71'; Sharifi (yellow card) 74'	Stadium: Legacy Early College Field; Attendance: 2,574; Referee: Chris Ruska

April 30, 2022 4	FC Tucson	0–2	Tormenta FC	Tucson, Arizona
10:00 PM EDT	Machell (yellow card) 5'; Perez (yellow card) 29' (red card) 62'; Fox (yellow card) 77'	Report	Billhardt 61'; Phelps (yellow card) 77'; Bosua (yellow card) 81'; Sharifi 84'	Stadium: Kino Sports Complex; Attendance: 1,026; Referee: Adam Zarrin

May 7, 2022 5	Tormenta FC	0–0	Charlotte Independence	Statesboro, Georgia
7:30 PM EDT	Sterling (yellow card) 90+2'	Report	Rocha (yellow card) 63'; Zendejas (yellow card) 77'; Ibarra (yellow card) 90+3'	Stadium: Erik Russell Park; Attendance: 1,242; Referee: Joshua Belk

May 14, 2022 6	North Carolina FC	2–3	Tormenta FC	Cary, North Carolina
5:00 PM EDT	McLaughlin 10'; Young (yellow card) 24'; Anderson 59'	Report	Phelps (yellow card) 2'; Sharifi (yellow card) 23', (goal) 41'; Sterling 31', (yellow card) 35'; Bosua 83'	Stadium: Sahlen's Stadium at WakeMed Soccer Park; Attendance: 1,056; Referee: Wes Caouette

May 21, 2022 7	Tormenta FC	0–4	Fuego FC	Statesboro, Georgia
7:30 PM EDT	Sterling (yellow card) 31'	Report	Falck 12'; S. Chavez 17'; Bijev 35', 42'; Schenfeld (yellow card) 59'; Dulysse (yellow card) 61'; Hornsby (yellow card) 75'; Antman (yellow card) 77'; Bustamante (yellow card) 90'	Stadium: Erik Russell Park; Attendance: 1,254; Referee: Alejo Calume

May 28, 2022 8	Tormenta FC	0–1	FC Tucson	Statesboro, Georgia
7:30 PM EDT	Sharifi (yellow card) 30'; Morrell (yellow card) 69'	Report	Shaw (yellow card) 4' (yellow-red card) 38'; T. Allen 36'; Machell (yellow card) 54'	Stadium: Erik Russell Park; Attendance: 925; Referee: Laura Chambers Waliski

June 4, 2022 9	Richmond Kickers	2–2	Tormenta FC	Richmond, Virginia
6:30 PM EDT	Ritchie 27'; Crisler 32'; Payne (yellow card) 76'	Report	Sharifi 22'; Thorn (yellow card) 30'; Billhardt 64'	Stadium: City Stadium; Attendance: 3,201; Referee: Anya Voigt

June 11, 2022 10	Hailstorm FC	1–1	Tormenta FC	Greeley, Colorado
9:00 PM EDT	Robles (yellow card) 40'; Folla (yellow card) 78'; Lukic (yellow card) 90'; Nortey 90+9'	Report	Adjei 54'; Thorn (yellow card) 86'; Phelps (yellow card) 90+11' (yellow-red card) 90+11'	Stadium: Jackson Stadium; Attendance: 813; Referee: Cristian Campos

June 19, 2022 11	Tormenta FC	2–2	Forward Madison	Statesboro, Georgia
7:30 PM EDT	Dengler 13'; Adeniyi (yellow card) 32'; Adjei 86'; Dengler (yellow card) 90+3'; Nembhard (yellow card) 90+4'	Report	Dean (yellow card) 41'; Torres (yellow card) 51'; Maldonado 56'; Smith 82'	Stadium: Erik Russell Park; Attendance: 937; Referee: Abdou Ndiaye

June 25, 2022 12	Tormenta FC	2–3	Union Omaha	Statesboro, Georgia
7:30 PM EDT	Phelps (yellow card) 5' (yellow-red card) 77'; Billhardt 17'; Adeniyi (yellow card) 45+4'; Dengler (yellow card) 54'; Bawa 90+3' (o.g.)	Report	Scearce 23', (yellow card) 42', (goal) 55' (pen.); Brito 74'; Galvan (yellow card) 90'; Piedrahita (yellow card) 90+3'	Stadium: Erik Russell Park; Attendance: 627; Referee: Josiah Parke

July 2, 2022 13	Fuego FC	0–1	Tormenta FC	Fresno, California
10:30 PM EDT	Dullysse (yellow card) 31'; Villarreal (yellow card) 78'	Report	Cabral 60'; Nembhard (yellow card) 70'; Jara (yellow card) 87'; Soto (yellow card) 90+4'	Stadium: Fresno State Soccer Stadium; Attendance: 1,546; Referee: Robert Vincze

July 9, 2022 14	Tormenta FC	2–1	Chattanooga Red Wolves	Statesboro, Georgia
7:30 PM EDT	Roberts (yellow card) 31', (goal) 37'; Cabral (yellow card) 34', (goal) 81'; Nembhard (yellow card) 46'	Report	Carrera (yellow card) 33', (goal) 45'; Cardona (yellow card) 53'; Avilez (yellow card) 76'; España (yellow card) 89'; Lombardi (yellow card) 90+2'	Stadium: Erik Russell Park; Attendance: 731; Referee: Amin Hadzic

July 13, 2022 15	Tormenta FC	5–5	Greenville Triumph	Statesboro, Georgia
7:30 PM EDT	Sterling 37', 44' (pen.); Roberts 54'; Otieno 61', (yellow card) 79'; Billhardt 87'	Report	Evans 3', 30'; Gavilanes 10'; Labovitz 21', 45+3'; Christensen (yellow card) 43'; Filerman (yellow card) 65'	Stadium: Erik Russell Park; Attendance: 909; Referee: Sergii Demianchuk

July 16, 2022 16	Forward Madison	2–0	Tormenta FC	Madison, Wisconsin
8:00 PM EDT	Wheeler-Omiunu (yellow card) 58'; Smith 76'; Cassini 86'	Report	Dengler (yellow card) 70'	Stadium: Breese Stevens Field; Attendance: 4,304; Referee: Alex Beehler

July 23, 2022 17	Tormenta FC	2–1	North Carolina FC	Statesboro, Georgia
7:30 PM EDT	Otieno (yellow card) 24'; Sterling 27' (pen.), 81'	Report	Fernandes (yellow card) 13'; Blanco (yellow card) 49'; Servania (yellow card) 68', (goal) 79'; Adams (yellow card) 90'	Stadium: Erik Russell Park; Attendance: 573; Referee: José Lara

July 30, 2022 18	Greenville Triumph	1–3	Tormenta FC	Greenville, South Carolina
7:00 PM EDT	Polak (yellow card) 21'; Labovitz 37'; Smart (yellow card) 50'; Ibarra (yellow card) 89'; Walker (yellow card) 90+3'; Cox-Ashwood (yellow card) 90+3'	Report	Billhardt (yellow card) 25'; Sterling 27'; Adjei 30'; Otieno (yellow card) 35'; Roberts (yellow card) 39'; Cabral 51'; Jara (yellow card) 90+3'	Stadium: Legacy Early College Field; Attendance: 2,740; Referee: John Rush

August 6, 2022 19	Hailstorm FC	2–0	Tormenta FC	Severance, Colorado
9:00 PM EDT	Amann (yellow card) 27'; Rogers 60'; Evans 82'; Dietrich (yellow card) 86'; Nortey (yellow card) 87'; Peñaranda (yellow card) 90+6'	Report	Green (yellow card) 15'; Phelps (yellow card) 54'; Nembhard (yellow card) 69'	Stadium: Severance High School; Attendance: 300; Referee: Adorae Monroy

August 13, 2022 20	Tormenta FC	0–3	Charlotte Independence	Statesboro, Georgia
7:30 PM EDT	Sierakowski (yellow card) 27'	Report	Dutey 16'; Conteh (yellow card) 33'; Mbuyu 44'; Bennett 86'; Barber (yellow card) 89'	Stadium: Erik Russell Park; Attendance: 1,194; Referee: Izlen Peksenar

August 20, 2022 21	Chattanooga Red Wolves	2–1	Tormenta FC	East Ridge, Tennessee
7:30 PM EDT	Mehl (yellow card) 38'; Navarro (yellow card) 45'; Galindrez 45+4', (penalty missed) 54'; Espinoza (yellow card) 64'; Ualefi (yellow card) 72'; Villalobos 80'; Ortiz (yellow card) 90+4'	Report	Adjei 8', (yellow card) 21'; Adeniyi (yellow card) 40'; Dengler (yellow card) 48'; Bush (yellow card) 52'; Green (yellow card) 90+4'	Stadium: CHI Memorial Stadium; Attendance: 2,209; Referee: Shawn Tehini

August 27, 2022 22	Fuego FC	0–2	Tormenta FC	Fresno, California
10:30 PM EDT	Casillas (yellow card) 24'; Cerritos (yellow card) 65'; Schenfeld (yellow card) 70'	Report	Cabral (yellow card) 25'; Sterling 26', 54'; Phelps (yellow card) 45+5'; Akale (yellow card) 54'; Sierakowski (yellow card) 71'; Billhardt (yellow card) 90+5'	Stadium: Fresno State Soccer Stadium; Attendance: 1,074; Referee: Adam Zarrin

August 31, 2022 23	Charlotte Independence	0–2	Tormenta FC	Charlotte, North Carolina
7:00 PM EDT	Rocha (yellow card) 5'; Bennett (yellow card) 55'; Barber (yellow card) 87'	Report	Sterling 6', (yellow card) 87'; Dengler (yellow card) 45+1'; Adeniyi (yellow card) 45+3'; Nembhard (yellow card) 50'; Adjei 71'	Stadium: American Legion Memorial Stadium; Attendance: 1,140; Referee: Emma Richards

September 7, 2022 24	Richmond Kickers	3–1	Tormenta FC	Richmond, Virginia
6:30 PM EDT	Terzaghi (yellow card) 21', (goal) 55'; Morán (yellow card) 68'; Bolanos 72', 90+4'; Aune (yellow card) 78'; Candela (yellow card) 90+3'	Report	Billhardt (penalty scored) 10'; Dengler (yellow card) 23'; Nembhard (yellow card) 23'; Phelps (yellow card) 34'; Adeniyi (yellow card) 82'; Bush (yellow card) 90+5'	Stadium: City Stadium; Attendance: 2,162; Referee: Katherine McCormick

September 10, 2022 25	Tormenta FC	3–1	Hailstorm FC	Statesboro, Georgia
7:30 PM EDT	Sterling 3', 41', (penalty scored) 76'; Adjei (yellow card) 35'; Billhardt (yellow card) 44'; Sharifi (yellow card) 89'	Report	Desdunes 28'; Prentice (yellow card) 54'	Stadium: Erik Russell Park; Attendance: 764; Referee: Joshua Belk

September 16, 2022 26	Tormenta FC	1–1	FC Tucson	Statesboro, Georgia
7:30 PM EDT	Sierakowski (yellow card) 28'; Akale (yellow card) 68', (goal) 76'; Heckenberg (yellow card) 90+7'	Report	Pérez (yellow card) 56'; Sunday (yellow card) 74'; Garcia 90+1'; Kinzner (yellow card) 90+5'	Stadium: Erik Russell Park; Attendance: 1,021; Referee: Izlen Peksenar

September 24, 2022 27	Forward Madison	0–1	Tormenta FC	Madison, Wisconsin
8:00 PM EDT	Rad (yellow card) 15'; Torres (yellow card) 21'; Mbacke Thiam (yellow card) 26' (yellow-red card) 46'; Wheeler-Omiunu (yellow card) 34'	Report	Nembhard (yellow card) 41'; Phelps 49'	Stadium: Breese Stevens Field; Attendance: 3,619; Referee: Jervis Atagana

October 2, 2022 28	Tormenta FC	1–1	Richmond Kickers	Statesboro, Georgia
7:30 PM EDT	Adeniyi 41', (yellow card) 67'; Otieno (yellow card) 62'	Report	Terzaghi (yellow card) 45+1'; Aune 90+1'; Barnathan (yellow card) 90+2'	Stadium: Optim Health System Park; Attendance: 2,000; Referee: Alefo Calume

October 8, 2022 29	Union Omaha	1–1	Tormenta FC	Papillion, Nebraska
8:00 PM EDT	Doyle 24'; Scearce (yellow card) 50'; Knutson (yellow card) 75'	Report	Green (red card) 22'; Sterling (penalty scored) 52'	Stadium: Werner Park; Attendance: 4,437; Referee: Greg Dopka

October 15, 2022 30	Tormenta FC	2–0	Chattanooga Red Wolves	Statesboro, Georgia
7:30 PM EDT	Adjei 5'; Sierakowski 24'	Report	Cardona (yellow card) 43'	Stadium: Optim Health System Park; Attendance: 1,250; Referee: Joshua Encarnación

==== USL League One playoffs ====
October 22, 2022 Quarter Finals	Tormenta FC	2–1	Charlotte Independence	Statesboro, Georgia
7:00 PM EDT	Sterling 48', (penalty scored) 77'	Report	Obertan 8'; Hegardt (yellow card) 40'; Acosta (red card) 49'; Pack (yellow card) 53'; Ibarra (yellow card) 75'; Zendejas (yellow card) 81'; Santos (yellow card) 82'; Ciss (yellow card) 82'; Shevtsov (yellow card) 90+3'	Stadium: Optim Sports Medicine Field; Attendance: 1,268; Referee: Ricardo Fierro

October 29, 2022 Semi Finals	Greenville Triumph SC	0–1	Tormenta FC	Greenville, South Carolina
7:30 PM EDT		Report	Sterling 42'	Stadium: Legacy Early College Field; Attendance: 2,070; Referee: John Griggs

November 6, 2022 Final	Tormenta FC	2–1	Chattanooga Red Wolves SC	Statesboro, Georgia
7:30 PM EST	Sterling 35' (pen.); Adjei (yellow card) 39'; Thorn (yellow card) 45+1'; Otieno (yellow card) 72'; Roberts 82'	Report	España (yellow card) 13'; Espinoza (yellow card) 33'; Ortiz (yellow card) 34'; Tejera 45+3'; Benton (yellow card) 72'; Carrera (yellow card) 85'	Stadium: Optim Sports Medicine Field; Attendance: 3,045; Referee: Elvis Osmanovic

=== U.S. Open Cup ===
April 7, 2022 2nd Round	Charleston Battery (USLC) (South Carolina)	0–1	(Georgia (U.S. state)) Tormenta FC (USL1)	Mount Pleasant, South Carolina
10:00 AM EDT	Piggott (yellow card) 24'; Hogan (yellow card) 32'; St. Martin (yellow card) 62'; Schmidt (yellow card) 83'; Ettienne (yellow card) 83'	Report	Bosua (yellow card) 28', (goal) 61'; Nembhard (yellow card) 57'; Heckenberg (yellow card) 67'; Roberts (yellow card) 79'; Dengler (yellow card) 81'; Cabral (yellow card) 85'	Stadium: Patriots Point Soccer Complex; Attendance: 0 Referee: Izlen Peksenar
Note: Originally scheduled for April 6, but was postponed due to severe weather. Game was played behind closed doors.

April 19, 2022 3rd Round	Birmingham Legion FC (USLC) (Alabama)	0–2	(Georgia (U.S. state)) Tormenta FC (USL1)	Tuscaloosa, Alabama
8:00 PM EDT	Lapa (yellow card) 33'; Kasim (yellow card) 44'; Asiedu (yellow card) 62'; Lopez (yellow card) 73'; Marlon (yellow card) 84'	Report	Cabral (yellow card) 17'; Thorn 33'; Roberts (yellow card) 41'; Dengler 45'; Sharifi (yellow card) 54'; Jara (yellow card) 83'; Green (yellow card) 90+2'	Stadium: Alabama Soccer Stadium; Referee: Sergii Demianchuk

May 10, 2022 Round of 32	Inter Miami CF (MLS) (Florida)	3–1	(Georgia (U.S. state)) Tormenta FC (USL1)	Fort Lauderdale, Florida
8:00 PM EDT	Lassiter 45', 83'; Robinson 47'	Report	Sterling 88'	Stadium: DRV PNK Stadium; Attendance: 3,198; Referee: Alejo Calume
