= 2020 Union Omaha season =

Union Omaha
2020 season
- Head coach: Jay Mims
- USL League One: 2nd
- USL1 Playoffs: Runner up
- U.S. Open Cup: Cancelled
- Top goalscorer: League: All: Evan Conway (6 goals)
- Highest home attendance: 2,700 vs. FTL (Oct. 24)
- Lowest home attendance: 2,400 (multiple times)
- Average home league attendance: 2,500
- Biggest win: OMA 3–0 TRM (Oct. 3)
- Biggest defeat: CHA 2–0 OMA (Sept. 15); OMA 0–2 NE (Sept. 19)
Home colors	Away colors

The 2020 Union Omaha season was the first season in the soccer team's history, where they competed in the third division of American soccer, USL League One, the second season of that competition. Union Omaha played their home games at Werner Park, located in Papillion, Nebraska, United States. Union Omaha finished the regular season in second place to qualify for the USL League One final to take place against Greenville Triumph, however the game was canceled due to an outbreak of COVID-19 on the Union Omaha roster. Greenville were awarded the title as a result of finishing with the highest points per game average during the regular season.

== Roster ==
As of August 1, 2020

No.	Position	Nation	Player
2	DF	USA	Luke Hauswirth
3	DF	ESP	Damià Viader
4	DF	USA	Nathan Aune
5	MF	KEN	Tobias Otieno
6	MF	USA	Tyler David
7	FW	USA	Ethan Vanacore-Decker
10	MF	ARG	Sebastián Contreras
11	FW	USA	Evan Conway
12	MF	USA	Austin Panchot
13	DF	USA	Daltyn Knutson
14	MF	ESA	Christian Molina
15	FW	CMR	Elma N'For
16	DF	AUT	Jake Crull
17	MF	USA	JP Scearce
18	FW	BIH	Elvir Ibišević
19	MF	MEX	Manny Lira
20	MF	USA	Devin Boyce
21	GK	USA	Sam Howard
22	FW	ARG	Juan Ignacio Mare
23	MF	USA	Xavier Gomez
24	GK	GHA	Rashid Nuhu
25	DF	COD	Ferrety Sousa
28	DF	GHA	Illal Osumanu
43	GK	USA	Brian Holt

== Competitions ==
=== Exhibitions ===
February 16, 2020 Wasatch Winter Cup 1	Real Monarchs	0–0	Union Omaha	Herriman, Utah
5:00 PM MST		Report	Trialist (yellow card)	Stadium: Zions Bank Training Center

February 19, 2020 Wasatch Winter Cup 2	Louisville City FC	1–1	Union Omaha	Herriman, Utah
1:00 PM MST	Thiam 38' (pen.)	Report	Viader 80' (pen.)	Stadium: Zions Bank Training Center

February 22, 2020 Wasatch Winter Cup 3	Colorado Springs Switchbacks FC	0–1	Union Omaha	Herriman, Utah
11:30 AM MST		Report	Mare 43'	Stadium: Zions Bank Training Center

March 4, 2020 Preseason 1	Creighton Bluejays	v	Union Omaha	Omaha, Nebraska
5:00 PM CST				Stadium: Morrison Stadium

March 20, 2020 Preseason 2	Omaha Mavericks	v	Union Omaha	Omaha, Nebraska
1:00 PM CDT				Stadium: Al F. Caniglia Field

=== USL League One ===
==== Standings ====
Pos	Team	Pld	W	L	D	GF	GA	GD	Pts	PPG	Qualification
1	Greenville Triumph SC	16	11	3	2	24	11	+13	35	2.19	Final, 2021 U.S. Open Cup
2	Union Omaha	16	8	3	5	20	15	+5	29	1.81	Final
3	North Texas SC (Note: Professional teams that are owned by teams playing in a higher division are ineligible for the U.S. Open Cup.)	16	7	3	6	27	19	+8	27	1.69	
4	Richmond Kickers	16	8	6	2	22	22	0	26	1.63	
5	Chattanooga Red Wolves SC	15	6	5	4	21	17	+4	22	1.47	

Source: 2020 USL League One standings
Rules for classification: 1) points; 2) total wins; 3) total goal differential; 4) total goals scored; 5) points earned against top four Conference finishers; 6) disciplinary points; 7) coin toss or drawing of lots

==== Results summary ====
Overall								Home						Away					
Pld	W	D	L	GF	GA	GD	Pts	W	D	L	GF	GA	GD	W	D	L	GF	GA	GD
16	8	5	3	20	15	+5	29	5	1	2	9	5	+4	3	4	1	11	10	+1

Source: USL League One

==== Results by round ====
Round	1	2	3	4	5	6	7	8	9	10	11	12	13	14	15	16
Stadium	A	H	A	H	A	H	H	A	A	H	H	A	H	A	A	H
Result	D	W	W	D	D	W	W	D	L	L	L	W	W	D	W	W
Position	6	4	2	2	3	3	2	2	3	3	4	3	2	3	2	2

Source: USL League One
A = Away; H = Home; W = Win; D = Draw; L = Loss

==== Match results ====
July 25, 2020 1	New England Revolution II	0–0	Union Omaha	Foxborough, Massachusetts
4:00 PM CDT	Bell (yellow card) 40'; Burns (yellow card) 90+3'; Sinclair (yellow card) 90+5'; Verfurth (yellow card) 90+7'	Report	Contreras (yellow card) 54'	Stadium: Gillette Stadium; Referee: Adam Kilpatrick

August 1, 2020 2	Union Omaha	1–0	North Texas SC	Papillion, Nebraska
7:00 PM CDT	Nuhu (yellow card) 38'; Conway 74'	Report	Álvarez (yellow card) 11'	Stadium: Werner Park; Attendance: 2,400; Referee: Lukasz Szpala

August 8, 2020 3	FC Tucson	1–2	Union Omaha	Tucson, Arizona
9:30 PM CDT	Alarcón (yellow card) 49'; Calvo (yellow card) 63'; Ramos-Godoy (yellow card) 76'; Virgen 90+3'	Report	Conway (yellow card) 23'; Hauswirth 48', (yellow card) 78'; Vanacore-Decker 58'; Boyce (yellow card) 77'; Mare (yellow card) 90+5'	Stadium: Kino North Stadium; Referee: Isaiah Vlad

August 12, 2020 4	Chattanooga Red Wolves SC	P–P	Union Omaha	East Ridge, Tennessee
4:00 PM CDT				Stadium: Chattanooga Red Wolves Stadium
Note: Match postponed due to severe weather.

August 19, 2020 5	Union Omaha	1–1	Forward Madison FC	Papillion, Nebraska
7:00 PM CDT	Contreras 28' (pen.); N'For (yellow card) 45+3'	Report	Leonard 8'; Trimmingham (yellow card) 31' (yellow-red card) 83'	Stadium: Werner Park; Attendance: 2,400; Referee: Karen Abt

August 23, 2020 6	North Texas SC	2–2	Union Omaha	Arlington, Texas
8:00 PM CDT	Cerrillo 2'; Damus (red card) 51'; Romero (yellow card) 56'; Che (yellow card) 71'; Alisson (yellow card) 73'; Rayo 79'; Roberts (yellow card) 90+4'	Report	Scearce (yellow card) 21', (goal) 75'; Vanacore-Decker (yellow card) 23', (goal) 84'; Sousa (yellow card) 24'; Nuhu (red card) 51'	Stadium: Globe Life Park; Attendance: 855; Referee: Brandon Gardner

August 29, 2020 7	Union Omaha	2–1	FC Tucson	Papillion, Nebraska
7:00 PM CDT	Boyce 16'; David (yellow card) 28'; Viader (yellow card) 55'; Sousa (yellow card) 73'; Molina 78'	Report	Adams 33'	Stadium: Werner Park; Attendance: 2,400; Referee: Calin Radosav

September 6, 2020 8	Union Omaha	1–0	Orlando City B	Papillion, Nebraska
7:00 PM CDT	Vanacore-Decker (yellow card) 35'; Conway 43'; Viader (yellow card) 81'	Report	Monticelli (yellow card) 28'; Lamb (yellow card) 45+4'; Carabalí (yellow card) 83'; Rosales (yellow card) 90+2'	Stadium: Werner Park; Attendance: 2,400; Referee: Matthew Corrigan

September 11, 2020 9	South Georgia Tormenta FC	2–2	Union Omaha	Statesboro, Georgia
7:00 PM CDT	Mayr-Fälten 11'; Rashid Nuhu 22' (o.g.); Arslan (yellow card) 63'; Micaletto (yellow card) 74'	Report	Sousa (yellow card) 62', (goal) 81'; N'For 70'	Stadium: Eagle Field at Erk Russell Athletic Park; Attendance: 400; Referee: Sergii Demianchuk

September 15, 2020 4	Chattanooga Red Wolves SC	2–0	Union Omaha	East Ridge, Tennessee
11:00 AM CDT	Zacarías 18'; Ramos (yellow card) 51'; Dieterich 62'; Ruiz (yellow card) 90+4'	Report	David (yellow card) 22'; Mare (yellow card) 90+4'	Stadium: Chattanooga Red Wolves Stadium; Referee: Kyle Johnston
Note: Re-schedule of postponed August 12 match.

September 19, 2020 10	Union Omaha	0–2	New England Revolution II	Papillion, Nebraska
7:00 PM CDT	David (yellow card) 60'; Scearce (yellow card) 88'; Vanacore-Decker (red card) 90+1'	Report	Rennicks 11'; Sinclair (yellow card) 58'; Firmino 90+8'	Stadium: Werner Park; Attendance: 2,500; Referee: Jon Freemon

September 26, 2020 11	Union Omaha	0–1	Richmond Kickers	Papillion, Nebraska
7:00 PM CDT	Boyce (yellow card) 58'; Scearce (yellow card) 71'	Report	Magalhães 71'	Stadium: Werner Park; Attendance: 2,600; Referee: Lorenzo Hernandez

September 30, 2020 12	Fort Lauderdale CF	2–3	Union Omaha	Fort Lauderdale, Florida
8:00 PM EDT	Méndez (yellow card) 16'; Sosa 42'; Valencia 55'; Nodarse (yellow card) 73'; Guediri (yellow card) 75'	Report	Panchot 25'; Boyce (yellow card) 38'; Otieno (yellow card) 44'; Conway 48'; Knutson (yellow card) 83'; Vanacore-Decker 84'	Stadium: Inter Miami CF Stadium; Referee: Alyssa Nichols

October 3, 2020 13	Union Omaha	3–0	South Georgia Tormenta FC	Papillion, Nebraska
7:00 PM CDT	Conway 38'; Viader 78'; Scearce 83'	Report	Mueller (yellow card) 53'	Stadium: Werner Park; Attendance: 2,600; Referee: Chris Ruska

October 11, 2020 14	Forward Madison FC	0–0	Union Omaha	Wauwatosa, Wisconsin
4:00 PM CDT	Ovalle (yellow card) 2'; Leonard (yellow card) 71'; Lockaby (yellow card) 90+5'	Report	Knutson (yellow card) 5'; Boyce (yellow card) 31'	Stadium: Hart Park; Referee: Calin Radosav

October 18, 2020 15	Greenville Triumph SC	1–2	Union Omaha	Greenville, South Carolina
3:00 PM EDT	Pilato 36'; Walker (yellow card) 38'; Stripling (yellow card) 90+4'	Report	Molina 19'; Sousa (yellow card) 22'; Scearce (yellow card) 43'; Viader (yellow card) 60'; Conway 66'	Stadium: Legacy Early College Field; Attendance: 1,513; Referee: Izlen Peksenar

October 24, 2020 16	Union Omaha	1–0	Fort Lauderdale CF	Papillion, Nebraska
7:00 PM CDT	Otieno (yellow card) 55'; Conway 90+1'	Report	Méndez (yellow card) 6'; Lopez-Espin (yellow card) 44'; Sosa (yellow card) 90'	Stadium: Werner Park; Attendance: 2,700; Referee: Karen Callado

==== Playoff Final ====
October 30, 2020	Greenville Triumph SC	Cancelled	Union Omaha	Greenville, South Carolina
8:00pm (EDT)				Stadium: Legacy Early College Field

Note: Game was cancelled after several players tested positive for COVID-19. Greenville was awarded the title based on points per game average (2.188 to 1.825).

== Statistics ==
=== Appearances and goals ===
Numbers after plus–sign (+) denote appearances as a substitute.

No.	Pos	Nat	Player	Total		USL-1		U.S. Open Cup	
No.	Pos	Nat	Player	Apps	Goals	Apps	Goals	Apps	Goals
2	DF	(United States) USA	Luke Hauswirth	11	1	9+2	1	0	0
3	DF	(Spain) ESP	Damià Viader	13	1	12+1	1	0	0
4	DF	(United States) USA	Nathan Aune	4	0	3+1	0	0	0
5	MF	(Kenya) KEN	Tobias Otieno	5	0	5+0	0	0	0
6	MF	(United States) USA	Tyler David	13	0	9+4	0	0	0
7	FW	(United States) USA	Ethan Vanacore-Decker	16	3	15+1	3	0	0
10	MF	(Argentina) ARG	Sebastián Contreras	15	1	11+4	1	0	0
11	FW	(United States) USA	Evan Conway	16	6	16+0	6	0	0
12	MF	(United States) USA	Austin Panchot	9	1	1+8	1	0	0
13	DF	(United States) USA	Daltyn Knutson	11	0	9+2	0	0	0
14	MF	(El Salvador) ESA	Christian Molina	11	2	4+7	2	0	0
15	FW	(Cameroon) CMR	Elma N'For	14	1	7+7	1	0	0
16	DF	(Austria) AUT	Jake Crull	13	0	11+2	0	0	0
17	MF	(United States) USA	JP Scearce	14	2	8+6	2	0	0
18	FW	(Bosnia and Herzegovina) BIH	Elvir Ibišević	9	0	3+6	0	0	0
19	MF	(Mexico) MEX	Manny Lira	0	0	0+0	0	0	0
20	MF	(United States) USA	Devin Boyce	16	1	13+3	1	0	0
21	GK	(United States) USA	Sam Howard	2	0	1+1	0	0	0
22	FW	(Argentina) ARG	Juan Ignacio Mare	9	0	3+6	0	0	0
23	MF	(United States) USA	Xavier Gomez	0	0	0+0	0	0	0
24	GK	(Ghana) GHA	Rashid Nuhu	15	0	15+0	0	0	0
25	DF	(Democratic Republic of the Congo) COD	Ferrety Sousa	13	1	7+6	1	0	0
28	DF	(Ghana) GHA	Illal Osumanu	15	0	14+1	0	0	0
43	GK	(United States) USA	Brian Holt	0	0	0+0	0	0	0

- Last updated: October 24, 2020
- Source: USL League One
