= Yoskar Galván-Mercado =

American soccer player (born 2003)

Personal information
- Date of birth: October 3, 2003 (age 23)
- Place of birth: Lexington, Nebraska, U.S.
- Height: 1.60 m (5 ft 3 in)
- Position: Midfielder

Team information
- Current team: Bellevue Bruins

Youth career
- 2021: Union Omaha

College career
| Years | Team | Apps | (Gls) |
| 2025– | Bellevue Bruins | 0 | (0) |

Senior career*
| Years | Team | Apps | (Gls) |
| 2021–2023 | Union Omaha | 12 | (0) |
| 2024 | Salt City SC | 2 | (0) |
- * Club domestic league appearances and goals as of March 22, 2025

Yoskar Galván-Mercado (born October 3, 2003) is an American college soccer player who plays as a midfielder for the Bellevue Bruins.

== Early life ==
Galván-Mercado was born in Lexington, Nebraska. Both of his parents are from Guatemala, where his father used to play and coach. Galván-Mercado would eventually play for Lexington High School's boys soccer team, who finished runners-up in the 2021 Nebraska Class B state championship during his senior year.

== Career ==
Galván-Mercado signed an academy contract with Union Omaha of USL League One in the summer of 2021, also making two appearances for the first-team during the 2021 season. He had previously participated in a USL Academy tournament for the team in the fall of 2019, before the start of the club's first season. In 2022, he signed with Union Omaha on a full professional contract.

Galván-Mercado joined the college soccer team of Bellevue University in March 2025.

== Career statistics ==
As of match played November 20, 2021

Appearances and goals by club, season and competition
| Club | Season | League | | | National cup | | Total | |
| Club | Season | Division | Apps | Goals | Apps | Goals | Apps | Goals |
|---|---|---|---|---|---|---|---|---|
| Union Omaha | 2021 | USL League One | 2 | 0 | 0 | 0 | 2 | 0 |
| Union Omaha | Career total | | 2 | 0 | 0 | 0 | 2 | 0 |
