= John Miglarese =

American soccer coach

Personal information
- Date of birth: June 10, 1978 (age 48)
- Place of birth: United States
- Position: Goalkeeper

College career
Years	Team	Apps	(Gls)
1996–1999	Georgia Southern Eagles	47	(0)

Managerial career
- 2000: Milligan Buffaloes (men's & women's asst.)
- 2001–2003: Georgia Southern Eagles (asst.)
- 2003–2005: Gardner–Webb Runnin' Bulldogs (associate HC)
- 2005–2008: Covenant Scots
- 2009–2012: John Brown Golden Eagles
- 2013–2016: King Tornado
- 2014–2016: Southern West Virginia King's Warriors
- 2016: UNC Pembroke Braves
- 2017–2020: Tormenta FC
- 2023–2024: St. Louis City SC (assistant)
- 2024: St. Louis City 2 (assistant)

John Miglarese (born June 10, 1978) is an American soccer coach who currently serves as the executive director of the Chattanooga FC foundation.

== Playing career ==
Miglarese played college soccer at Georgia Southern University, making 47 appearances across four years at the school.

== Coaching career ==
Miglarese has managed at a number of colleges throughout his career, including Covenant College, John Brown University, King University, and the University of North Carolina at Pembroke. His first non-college head coaching job was a two-year stint with the Southern West Virginia King's Warriors in the former PDL.

Miglarese joined USL League Two team Tormenta FC in early 2017, leading the club to a Deep South Division championship in 2018. During their first season in the newly-formed USL League One, Miglarese led the team to a sixth-place finish and a 9-10-9 record. On September 16, 2020, after Tormenta began their season with a 2-4-4 record, Miglarese was moved from his head coaching role to become the technical director and Vice President of Soccer Performance.

Miglarese began serving as St. Louis City SC assistant coach for the club's inaugural MLS season in 2023.

== Coaching statistics ==
As of match played September 16, 2020

Coaching record by team and tenure
Team	Nat	From	To	Record								Ref
Team	Nat	From	To	G	W	D	L	GF	GA	GD	Win %	Ref
Tormenta FC	(United States)	January 11, 2017	September 16, 2020	70	30	21	19	109	80	+29	42.86	
Total				70	30	21	19	109	80	+29	42.86	—
