= Barry Sharifi =

American soccer player

Personal information
- Full name: Barakatulla Sharifi
- Date of birth: November 10, 1997 (age 29)
- Place of birth: Jericho, New York, United States
- Height: 5 ft 10 in (1.78 m)
- Position: Midfielder

Youth career
- 2015–2016: New York Red Bulls

College career
Years	Team	Apps	(Gls)
2016–2019	Loyola Greyhounds	71	(19)

Senior career*
Years	Team	Apps	(Gls)
2017	Westchester Flames	8	(1)
2018–2019	New York Red Bulls U23	10	(3)
2020	New York Red Bulls II	11	(0)
2021	Loudoun United	2	(0)
2022	South Georgia Tormenta	15	(3)
- * Club domestic league appearances and goals as of October 16, 2022

Barakatulla "Barry" Sharifi (born November 10, 1997) is an American soccer player who plays as a midfielder.

== Career ==
=== Youth, College & Amateur ===
Sharifi spent time with the New York Red Bulls academy, before playing four years of college soccer at Loyola University Maryland between 2016 and 2019, where he made 71 appearances, scored 19 goals and tallied 19 assists.

While in college, Sharifi appeared for USL Premier Development League sides Westchester Flames and New York Red Bulls U-23.

=== Professional ===
On January 13, 2020, Sharifi was selected 67th overall in the 2020 MLS SuperDraft by New York Red Bulls. On March 5, 2020, Sharifi signed his first professional contract with New York Red Bulls II in the USL Championship. He was released by Red Bulls II on November 30, 2020. On 19 February 2021, Sharifi joined Loudoun United FC ahead of the 2021 season.

On April 1, 2022, Sharifi signed with USL League One side South Georgia Tormenta.
