= Deshawon Nembhard =

Belizean footballer (born 1994)

Personal information
- Date of birth: 8 October 1994 (age 32)
- Place of birth: Corozal Town, Belize
- Height: 1.85 m (6 ft 1 in)
- Positions: Defender; midfielder

Youth career
- 2012–2013: Solar Chelsea

College career
Years	Team	Apps	(Gls)
2013	SMU Mustangs	17	(0)
2014–2017	FIU Panthers	36	(2)

Senior career*
Years	Team	Apps	(Gls)
2018	FC Miami City	4	(1)
2020	Charleston Battery	8	(0)
2021	Stumptown AC	18	(2)
2022–2023	South Georgia Tormenta	54	(2)
2024	Central Valley Fuego FC	13	(0)

International career^{‡}
2021–	Belize	3	(1)
- * Club domestic league appearances and goals as of 31 October 2024 ‡ National team caps and goals as of 9 February 2022

Deshawon Nembhard (born 8 October 1994) is a Belizean footballer who plays as a defender.

== Career ==
=== College ===
Nembhard began playing college soccer at Southern Methodist University in 2013, before transferring after his freshman year. From 2014, Nembhard played at Florida International University, including a redshirt year in 2016.

=== FC Miami City ===
In 2018, Nembhard played in the fourth-tier USL PDL with FC Miami City, making 4 league appearances and scoring a single goal.

=== Charleston Battery ===
On 10 February 2020, Nembhard signed with USL Championship side Charleston Battery. He made his professional debut on 19 July 2020, starting in a 2–1 loss to Birmingham Legion FC.

=== Stumptown AC ===
Nembhard played the 2021 season with Stumptown AC of the National Independent Soccer Association.

=== South Georgia Tormenta ===
On 9 February 2022, Nembhard signed with USL League One club South Georgia Tormenta.

=== Central Valley Fuego ===
On 12 April 2024, Nembhard signed with USL League One side Central Valley Fuego FC.

== International career ==
On 18 February 2021, Nembhard was called up to the Belize national team. He made his debut on 25 March 2021 in a World Cup qualifier against Haiti.
