= Brittain Gottlieb =

American soccer player

Personal information
- Full name: Brittain Gottlieb
- Date of birth: January 14, 2003 (age 23)
- Place of birth: Georgia, United States
- Height: 5 ft 10 in (1.78 m)
- Position: Defender

Team information
- Current team: FIU Panthers
- Number: 25

Youth career
- 2018–2022: Tormenta

Senior career*
Years	Team	Apps	(Gls)
2021–2022	Tormenta	6	(0)
2021–2022	Tormenta 2	9	(1)
- * Club domestic league appearances and goals as of July 26, 2022

Brittain Gottlieb (born January 14, 2003) is an American professional soccer player who plays as a defender for FIU Panthers.

== Club career ==
Born in Georgia, Gottlieb played soccer for his school, Islands High School.

=== South Georgia Tormenta ===
On March 25, 2021, Gottlieb joined USL League One club South Georgia Tormenta on an amateur deal. He made his professional debut for the club on April 17, 2021, against Fort Lauderdale CF, coming on as an 85th-minute substitute in a 1–0 defeat.

=== College ===
In fall of 2022, Gottlieb left South Georgia to play college soccer at Florida International University.

== Career statistics ==
As of match played May 28, 2021

Appearances and goals by club, season and competition
Club	Season	League			Cup		Continental		Total	
Club	Season	Division	Apps	Goals	Apps	Goals	Apps	Goals	Apps	Goals
Tormenta	2021	USL League One	2	0	0	0	—		2	0
Tormenta 2	2021	USL League Two	1	0	0	0	—		1	0
Career total			3	0	0	0	0	0	3	0
