= Kazaiah Sterling =

English footballer (born 1998)

Personal information
- Full name: Kazaiah Sterling
- Date of birth: 9 November 1998 (age 27)
- Place of birth: Enfield, England
- Height: 1.75 m (5 ft 9 in)
- Position: Forward

Youth career
- Leyton Orient
- 2015–2017: Tottenham Hotspur

Senior career*
Years	Team	Apps	(Gls)
2017–2021	Tottenham Hotspur	0	(0)
2019	→ Sunderland (loan)	8	(1)
2019	→ Doncaster Rovers (loan)	3	(0)
2020	→ Leyton Orient (loan)	0	(0)
2020–2021	→ Southend United (loan)	10	(0)
2021	→ Greenock Morton (loan)	7	(0)
2021	Potters Bar Town	6	(3)
2022–2023	South Georgia Tormenta	48	(30)
2024	Pittsburgh Riverhounds	19	(3)

International career^{‡}
2015	England U17	7	(2)
2015	England U18	2	(1)
- * Club domestic league appearances and goals as of 14:17, 11 November 2024 (UTC) ‡ National team caps and goals as of 19:09, 7 December 2017 (UTC)

Kazaiah Roy Barrett Sterling (born 9 November 1998) is an English professional footballer who plays as a forward for SDS FC.

== Career ==
Born in Enfield and of Jamaican descent, Sterling attended Winchmore School and was in the youth programme at Leyton Orient until Tottenham signed him on 1 July 2015. He represented Tottenham in youth level competitions and played in the EFL Trophy against AFC Wimbledon and Barnet. On 6 December 2017, he made his competitive senior debut for the club, coming on as an 88th-minute substitute for Dele Alli in Spurs' final Champions League group game against APOEL Nicosia, a 3–0 win at Wembley Stadium.

In the January 2019 transfer window Sterling was loaned out to Sunderland for the remainder of the season. He made his EFL League One debut on 2 February 2019, in a 1–0 home win over AFC Wimbledon, as a 59th-minute substitute for Charlie Wyke. Sterling scored his first senior goal on 3 April 2019, in a 3–0 away win against Accrington Stanley.

In August 2019, Sterling went out on a season long loan to Doncaster Rovers. He scored his first goal for Doncaster in an EFL Trophy tie against Lincoln City on 3 September 2019.

After the Doncaster deal was cut short due to injury, Sterling signed for League Two club Leyton Orient on a six-month loan.

On 9 October 2020, Sterling joined Southend United on loan. He scored his first goal for the club on 10 November, in an EFL Trophy tie against Colchester United. On 5 January 2021, Sterling returned to Tottenham, after his loan at Southend came to an end.

On 1 February 2021, Sterling joined Scottish side Greenock Morton on loan until the end of the season.

On 4 October 2021, Sterling made his debut for Isthmian League Premier Division side Potters Bar Town, providing an assist before the game was abandoned.

On 28 February 2022, Sterling made the move to the United States, signing with third-tier USL League One side South Georgia Tormenta. He had an immediate impact, leading the club in goals and helping clinch a playoff spot. The club would go on to win the league championship on Sterling's four goals in the playoffs. He was named MVP of the championship match.

On 28 February 2024, Sterling signed with USL Championship side Pittsburgh Riverhounds on a one-year deal. He was released by Pittsburgh following their 2024 season.

In 2025, Sterling participated in the inaugural Baller League UK, winning the trophy for SDS FC. He was chosen as the MVP of the Season.

== Career statistics ==
As of Match played 1 October 2023

Appearances and goals by club, season and competition
Club	Season	League			FA Cup		League Cup		Europe		Other		Total	
Club	Season	Division	Apps	Goals	Apps	Goals	Apps	Goals	Apps	Goals	Apps	Goals	Apps	Goals
Tottenham Hotspur	2017–18	Premier League	0	0	0	0	0	0	1 (Note: Appearance in the UEFA Champions League)	0	—		1	0
Tottenham Hotspur	2018–19	Premier League	0	0	1	0	0	0	0	0	—		1	0
Tottenham Hotspur	2019–20	Premier League	0	0	0	0	0	0	0	0	—		0	0
Tottenham Hotspur	2020–21	Premier League	0	0	0	0	0	0	0	0	—		0	0
Tottenham Hotspur	Total		0	0	1	0	0	0	1	0	0	0	2	0
Tottenham U23s	2017–18		—								2 (Note: Appearances in EFL Trophy)	0	2	0
Tottenham U23s	2018–19		—								2	0	2	0
Tottenham U23s	Total		0	0	0	0	0	0	0	0	4	0	4	0
Sunderland (loan)	2018–19	League One	8	1	0	0	0	0	—		—		8	1
Doncaster Rovers (loan)	2019–20	League One	3	0	0	0	0	0	—		1	1	4	1
Southend United (loan)	2020–21	League One	10	0	0	0	1	0	—		1	1	12	1
Greenock Morton (loan)	2020–21	Scottish Championship	7	0	0	0	0	0	—		—		7	0
Potters Bar Town	2021–22	Isthmian League Premier Division	6	3	—		—		—		2 (Note: Appearance in FA Trophy)	2	8	5
Tormenta FC	2022	USL League One	26	17	—		3	1	—		0	0	29	18
Tormenta FC	2023	USL League One	21	15	—		0	0	—		0	0	21	15
Total			47	32			3	1			0	0	50	33
Career total			81	36	1	0	4	1	1	0	8	4	95	41

== Honours ==
Tormenta FC

- USL League One: 2022
