= Ian Cameron (footballer, born 1988) =

Scottish footballer and coach

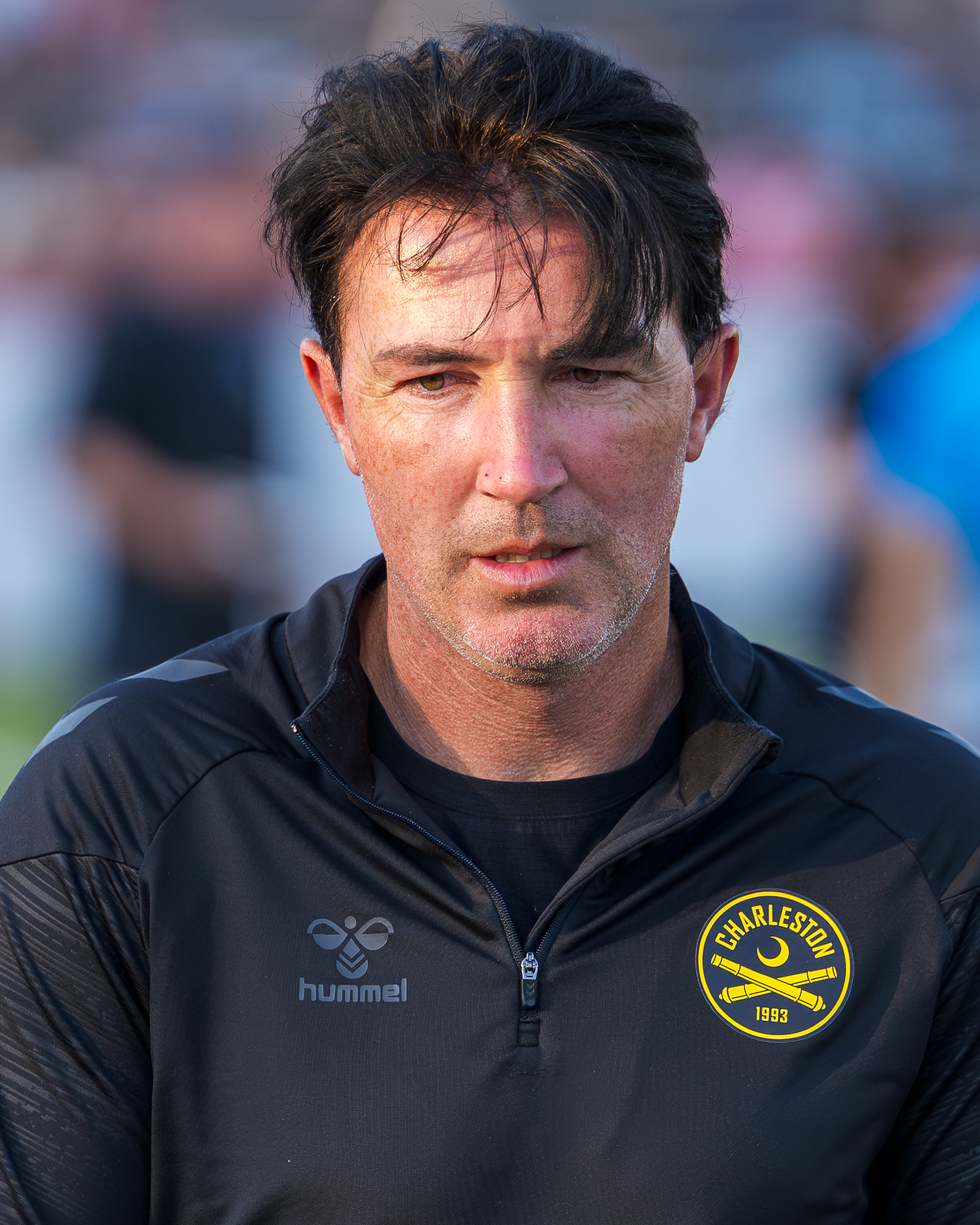
- Cameron with the Charleston Battery in 2026

Personal information
- Date of birth: 23 May 1988 (age 38)
- Place of birth: Glasgow, Scotland
- Position: Midfielder

Youth career
- Partick Thistle

College career
Years	Team	Apps	(Gls)
2007–2010	Mercer Bears	67	(17)

Senior career*
Years	Team	Apps	(Gls)
2004–2006	Partick Thistle		
2010	Indiana Invaders	5	(0)

International career
- Scotland U16
- Scotland U17
- Scotland U18

Managerial career
- 2013–2016: Mercer Bears (assistant)
- 2016–2019: Eckerd Tritons
- 2019–2020: South Georgia Tormenta 2
- 2020–2025: South Georgia Tormenta
- 2026–: Charleston Battery (assistant)
- * Club domestic league appearances and goals

Ian Cameron (born 23 May 1988) is a Scottish football coach and former player who serves as an assistant coach with USL Championship club Charleston Battery.

== Playing career ==
He represented the Scottish U16, Scotland U17, and Scotland U18 national teams. He had a spell as a player with Partick Thistle. Cameron played four years of college soccer at Mercer University between 2007 and 2010, making 67 appearances, scoring 17 goals and tallying 16 assists. He also played in the USL PDL with Indiana Invaders in 2010.

Following his college career, Cameron returned to Glasgow and earned a master's degree in Quantitative Finance from the University of Glasgow in 2012.

== Coaching career ==
Cameron was named assistant coach at his alma mater Mercer University in 2013, where he spent three years. In 2016, Cameron became head coach to Eckerd College.

On 17 September 2018, it was announced that Cameron would coach USL League Two side South Georgia Tormenta 2 whilst remaining at Eckerd College. He also coached in the Tormenta Academy and served as an assistant with the first team, in addition to his head coaching role with the second team.

Cameron was named head coach of the club's USL League One side South Georgia Tormenta on 16 September 2020. On 12 May 2022, Cameron was named USL League One Coach of the Month for April 2022. Cameron led Tormenta FC to their first ever USL League One championship, defeating the Chattanooga Red Wolves 2-1 in the final on November 6, 2022. He signed multi-year contract extension with Tormenta on December 14, 2022. On August 8, 2025, Tormenta FC announced that Cameron was stepping down from his role as Head Coach, departing after nearly five years with the club.

In January 2026, he joined USL Championship side Charleston Battery as an assistant coach.

== Personal life ==
He is the son of former professional footballer Ian Cameron. His sister Kayleigh played for women's football teams including Celtic.
