= Ethan Vanacore-Decker =

American soccer player

Personal information
- Date of birth: October 6, 1994 (age 32)
- Place of birth: Manahawkin, New Jersey, United States
- Height: 1.80 m (5 ft 11 in)
- Positions: Winger; forward

Team information
- Current team: Jackson Lions
- Number: 9

Youth career
- 2009–2011: NJCSA
- 2011–2013: New York Red Bulls

College career
| Years | Team | Apps | (Gls) |
| 2013–2014 | Connecticut Huskies | 30 | (7) |
| 2015 | Louisville Cardinals | 10 | (1) |
| 2017 | Rutgers Scarlet Knights | 7 | (2) |

Senior career*
| Years | Team | Apps | (Gls) |
| 2015 | New York Red Bulls U-23 | 3 | (1) |
| 2016–2018 | North County United | 25 | (6) |
| 2018–2019 | Swope Park Rangers | 34 | (5) |
| 2020–2021 | Union Omaha | 27 | (3) |
| 2022 | Northern Colorado Hailstorm | 12 | (1) |
| 2022–2023 | Richmond Kickers | 24 | (3) |
| 2024– | Jackson Lions | 0 | (0) |
- * Club domestic league appearances and goals as of April 17, 2024

Ethan Vanacore-Decker (born October 6, 1994) is an American professional soccer player who plays for the Jackson Lions in National Premier Soccer League.

He is a resident of the Manahawkin section of Stafford Township, New Jersey and attended the Pennington School.

== Career ==
=== Early career ===
Vanacore-Decker initially committed to beginning his college soccer career at University of North Carolina at Chapel Hill, before changing to the University of Connecticut, where he played for two years. Vanacore-Decker transferred to the University of Louisville in 2015. He again moved colleges in 2016, opting to attend Rutgers University. He was ineligible for their 2016 season due to NCAA transfer rules.

While at college, Vanacore-Decker played with USL PDL side New York Red Bulls U-23 in 2015, and South Florida Surf in 2016 and 2017. Following college, Vanacore-Decker remained playing in the PDL with North County United.

=== Professional ===
On August 10, 2018, Vanacore-Decker signed with USL club Swope Park Rangers. He made his professional debut on August 29, 2018, appearing as a 61st-minute substitute in a 2–1 win over Tulsa Roughnecks.

Vanacore-Decker joined USL League One expansion club Northern Colorado Hailstorm on January 28, 2022.

On July 18, 2022, Vanacore-Decker was acquired by Richmond Kickers in exchange for an international roster spot.

On November 30, 2023, Vanacore-Decker was released from Richmond Kickers. He was subsequently signed by Jackson Lions of the National Premier Soccer League on April 9, 2024.

== Career statistic ==
As of match played September 9, 2018

| Club | Season | League | | | Playoffs | | League Cup | | Continental | | Total | |
| Club | Season | Division | Apps | Goals | Apps | Goals | Apps | Goals | Apps | Goals | Apps | Goals |
|---|---|---|---|---|---|---|---|---|---|---|---|---|
| Swope Park Rangers | 2018 | USL | 2 | 0 | 0 | 0 | 0 | 0 | — | — | 2 | 0 |
| Career total | | | 2 | 0 | 0 | 0 | 0 | 0 | 0 | 0 | 2 | 0 |
