= Daltyn Knutson =

American soccer player (born 1997)

Personal information
- Date of birth: March 1, 1997 (age 29)
- Place of birth: Spring, Texas, US
- Height: 1.88 m (6 ft 2 in)
- Position: Midfielder

Team information
- Current team: Miami FC
- Number: 11

Youth career
- 2012–2015: Houston Texans

College career
Years	Team	Apps	(Gls)
2015–2018	Central Arkansas Bears	70	(6)

Senior career*
Years	Team	Apps	(Gls)
2016	Derby City Rovers	11	(1)
2017	Houston FC	8	(1)
2018	GPS Portland Phoenix	11	(0)
2019	South Georgia Tormenta	22	(0)
2020–2022	Union Omaha	61	(1)
2023	South Georgia Tormenta	21	(0)
2024–	Miami FC	88	(5)
- * Club domestic league appearances and goals as of November 7, 2026

Daltyn Knutson (born March 1, 1997) is an American professional soccer player who plays as a midfielder for Miami FC in the USL Championship.

== Career ==
=== Professional ===
In March 2019, Knutson signed for USL League One club Tormenta FC. He made his league debut for the club on April 3, 2019, coming on as an 89th-minute substitute for Conner Antley in a 3–1 home win over FC Tucson.

Knutson joined League One expansion side Union Omaha on January 14, 2020.

Knutson signed with USL Championship club Miami FC on December 13, 2023.
