= Christian Molina (footballer) =

Salvadoran footballer (born 1998)

Personal information
- Full name: Christian Oswaldo Molina Sorto
- Date of birth: 28 April 1998 (age 28)
- Place of birth: San Salvador, El Salvador
- Height: 1.63 m (5 ft 4 in)
- Position: Midfielder

Youth career
- 2014–2016: Houston Dynamo

College career
Years	Team	Apps	(Gls)
2016–2019	NIU Huskies	59	(3)

Senior career*
Years	Team	Apps	(Gls)
2017–2019	Brazos Valley Cavalry	23	(5)
2020–2021	Union Omaha	20	(2)
2022	Richmond Kickers	3	(0)

International career
2019	El Salvador U23	1	(0)
- * Club domestic league appearances and goals as of 19:38, 16 October 2022 (UTC)

Christian Oswaldo Molina Sorto (born 28 April 1998) is a Salvadoran footballer who last played as a midfielder for Richmond Kickers in USL League One.

== Career ==
=== Youth, college and amateur ===
Molina was part of the Houston Dynamo academy.

Molina played four years of college soccer at Northern Illinois University between 2016 and 2019. During his time with the Huskies, Molina made 59 appearances, scoring 3 goals and tallying 7 assists, and earned All-Mid-America Conference honors.

During college, Molina also played in the USL League Two with Brazos Valley Cavalry between 2017 and 2019.

=== Professional ===
On January 14, 2020, Molina signed with USL League One side Union Omaha. He made his professional debut on August 1, 2020, appearing as an 63rd-minute substitute in a 1–0 win over North Texas SC.

On 15 February 2022, Molina signed with USL League One club Richmond Kickers. At the end of the 2022 season, his contract option was declined by the Kickers.

=== International ===
Molina has won a single cap for El Salvador U23's, appearing as a 55th-minute substitute in a 6–1 loss to the United States U23 on 16 November 2019.
