= Tobias Otieno =

Kenyan footballer

Personal information
- Full name: Tobias Otieno Omondi
- Date of birth: 25 October 1998 (age 28)
- Place of birth: Kenya
- Height: 1.79 m (5 ft 10 in)
- Position: Defensive midfielder

Senior career*
| Years | Team | Apps | (Gls) |
| –2019 | SoNy Sugar | | |
| 2019–2020 | Gor Mahia | | |
| 2020–2021 | Union Omaha | 28 | (1) |
| 2022–2023 | South Georgia Tormenta | 46 | (3) |
| 2025–2026 | Kenya Police F.C. | | |
| 2026- | TRA United | | |

International career
- Kenya U23
- * Club domestic league appearances and goals as of 16 October 2023

Tobias Otieno Omondi (born 25 October 1998) is a Kenyan footballer who plays as a defensive midfielder.

== Career ==
=== Union Omaha ===
Otieno joined USL League One side Union Omaha on 14 January 2020 from Kenyan Premier League side Gor Mahia. He made his debut on 30 September 2020, starting in a 3–2 win away to Fort Lauderdale CF.

=== South Georgia Tormenta ===
On 15 February 2022, Otieno signed with USL League One club South Georgia Tormenta.

=== Kenya Police F.C. ===
In 2025 Otieno signed for Kenya Police F.C. on a free transfer.

=== TRA United ===
In 2026 Otieno signed for TRA United for an undisclosed fee.
