= Elma N'For =

Cameroonian footballer

Elma Nfor
Personal information
- Date of birth: 17 December 1965 (age 60)
- Place of birth: Yaounde, Cameroon
- Height: 1.72 m (5 ft 8 in)
- Position: Forward

College career
Years	Team	Apps	(Gls)
2014–2015	SMC Pioneers		
2016–2017	Wingate Bulldogs	27	(15)

Senior career*
Years	Team	Apps	(Gls)
2017–2018	Asheville City	27	(13)
2019	Lansing Ignite	18	(4)
2020–2021	Union Omaha	29	(1)
- * Club domestic league appearances and goals as of 31 October 2021

Elma Nfor (born 17 December 1995) is a Cameroonian footballer who last played as a forward for Union Omaha in USL League One.
