= Tormenta FC =

American soccer club in Statesboro, Georgia

- Full name: South Georgia Tormenta Football Club
- Nickname: Ibises
- Founded: 2015; 11 years ago
- Stadium: Tormenta Stadium; Statesboro, Georgia
- Capacity: 3,500
- Coordinates: 32.409722°N 81.796111°W
- Co-owners: Darin Van Tassell; Netra Van Tassell; Jeff Spencer
- Head coach: Mark McKeever
- League: USL League One
- 2025: USL League One, 6th of 14; Playoffs: Quarter-finals
- Website: tormentafc.com
Home colors	Away colors

South Georgia Tormenta FC, or simply Tormenta FC, is an American soccer organization based in Statesboro, Georgia, United States. Founded in 2015, the club fielded a professional team in USL League One until 2025, as well as a pre-professional team in USL League Two called Tormenta FC 2 (which is on hiatus since the 2023 season) and a pre-professional team in USL W League. Tormenta FC withdrew from the 2026 USL1 season and are currently on hiatus.

The team colors are midnight navy, sky blue, silver, and magenta. The team's crest shows an ibis. Tormenta FC's USL League One team and the W-League team both emerged victorious in 2022, becoming champions in their respective leagues.

== History ==
South Georgia Tormenta FC was founded in 2015 making it Statesboro's first pro team in any sport in 60 years, since the Statesboro Pilots of baseball's Georgia State League folded in 1955. Owned by Tormenta FC LLC, the operations of the franchise are steered by Darin Van Tassell and Netra Van Tassell. The word "tormenta" means "storm" in Spanish. The name also serves as a tribute to the former Storm Soccer Academy based out of Savannah, which was incorporated into the Tormenta FC academy system upon the team's founding.

=== 2016 ===
On May 21, 2016, Tormenta FC hosted its inaugural home match against the Carolina Dynamo in front of 3,105 fans.

Tormenta FC won their first match in club history on June 16, 2016 against the Charlotte Eagles in a 2–0 decision. The club then followed up that victory with a second consecutive win on June 18, 2016 by defeating the Carolina Dynamo 1–0. On June 23, 2016, Tormenta FC not only scored their first ever home goal, but the team managed to win their first home match as well; a 1–0 victory over Southern West Virginia King's Warriors.

Tormenta had a five-game win streak snapped in a 2–1 defeat against the King's Warriors on July 2, 2016.

The club finished 6th out of 8 in the South Atlantic Division.

Following their inaugural season, Tormenta announced the signing of "friendship agreements" with FC Academy in Monte Compatri, Italy, ASD Grottaferrata Calcio in Grottaferrata, Italy and KF Tirana in Tirana, Albania.

On December 6, Tormenta FC was named "New Franchise of the Year" at the PDL's Winter Summit due to the club's successes on and off the field.

=== 2017 ===
Tormenta FC finished the 2017 season in 4th place in the PDL's South Atlantic Division, posting a 7-3-4 record with a +17 goal differential.

Despite falling short of a postseason appearance, the team hosted the PDL's Eastern Conference playoff semifinal and final matches at Eagle Field.

=== 2018 ===
On January 25, 2018, South Georgia Tormenta FC was announced as the first founding member of USL League One for 2019 in a press conference held at Paulson Stadium's Bishop Fieldhouse. The team had an undefeated regular season in 2018, clinching the Deep South Division championship. Tormenta FC hosted the conference playoffs in Statesboro, Georgia, falling to The Villages SC in the Conference Semifinals.

=== 2019 ===
On March 29, 2019, Tormenta FC hosted the inaugural match of USL League One, winning 1–0 against the Greenville Triumph and setting a new attendance record of 3,519. After a successful start to the season that saw the team in second place, a second-half downturn with 2 wins in their last 16 matches brought them down to 6th place and out of a playoff spot.

After the conclusion of the season, Tormenta completed the first outgoing transfer in USL League One history, sending Defender of the Year Conner Antley to USL Championship side Indy Eleven for an undisclosed fee.

=== 2020 ===
On September 16, 2020, Tormenta announced that it had promoted John Miglarese to Technical Director, and promote previous assistant coach and head coach of Tormenta 2, Ian Cameron, to head coach of the first team. The team finished 8th out of 11 in the USL League One table in a modified 16 match season due to the COVID-19 pandemic.

=== 2021 ===
On June 8, 2021, Tormenta announced they will be fielding a women's side to compete in the new USL W League beginning in 2022. Despite holding a 5th place spot halfway through the year, the USL League One team ultimately finished in 11th place, five points from the bottom of the table.

=== 2022 ===
In the off season, the club signed former Tottenham Hotspur F.C. and English youth international player Kazaiah Sterling. Tormenta achieved a team-best Round of 32 appearance in the U.S. Open Cup, defeating USL Championship sides Charleston Battery and Birmingham Legion before falling to MLS side Inter Miami, 3–1. On October 2, 2022, the club opened their own soccer specific stadium, Tormenta Stadium, in a 1–1 draw against the Richmond Kickers. The club finished the season in third place, qualifying for the first round of the USL League One playoffs. In the club's first ever playoff appearance, they defeated sixth seeded Charlotte Independence and then second seeded Greenville Triumph before winning the USL League One Final against Chattanooga Red Wolves SC by a score of 2–1 in front of a home crowd of 3,045.

=== 2023 ===
Tormenta again saw success in the U.S. Open Cup the following season, notching a win over USL Championship side Rio Grande Valley FC Toros to face MLS side Charlotte FC in the Third Round, where they were defeated 4–1. The club remained in playoff contention until the final day of the regular season, finishing one point away from the 6th place spot after a 1–1 draw with the Charlotte Independence.

=== 2024 ===
In 2024, Tormenta equalized their record Round of 32 U.S. Open Cup appearance, besting the CFL Spurs, Savannah Clovers, and Miami FC, and fell to the Charleston Battery in extra time. The club suffered a downturn in form in the second half of the season, and finished in 10th of 12 teams. The club also made its debut in the USL Cup, finishing with a 0–4–4 record in the East Group, including two penalty shootout wins.

On July 24, 2024, Tormenta FC agreed to transfer defender Nick Akoto to EFL League One side Burton Albion FC, breaking the league's record transfer fee for an outgoing player and becoming the first paid international transfer in league history.

=== 2025 ===
Despite another successful U.S. Open Cup run to the Third Round, South Georgia experienced a slow start in league play, remaining in the bottom four spots in the table for much of the first half of the season. On August 8, 2025, Tormenta announced the resignation of longtime manager Ian Cameron. Recently appointed assistant coach Mark McKeever was named as interim manager while the club conducted a new managerial search. After leading the team to a 5–1–1 record as an interim, McKeever was appointed as Tormenta's head coach on September 24. Under McKeever, Tormenta ended the season on a nine match unbeaten run, a club record, and rose to sixth in the table, earning a playoff spot. South Georgia travelled to face Spokane Velocity in the Quarterfinals, falling in penalties after a 1–1 result.

In the offseason, Tormenta FC transferred All-League First Team striker Niall Reid-Stephen to New Mexico United, equaling the record transfer fee between a League One and USL Championship club.

=== Hiatus ===
On February 23, 2026, twelve days before the season started, Tormenta announced that they would not be fielding a team for the 2026 USL League One season. The front office remained employed, while the team's players were given three months of severance pay. They also had to withdraw from the 2026 US Open Cup automatically losing to FC America CFL Spurs in the first round.

== Stadium ==
Tormenta FC currently plays at Tormenta Stadium, a soccer-specific stadium in Statesboro with a current capacity of 3,500. The stadium plans to have a capacity of 5,300 when completed. They previously played at Eagle Field at Erk Russell Park on the campus of Georgia Southern University from 2016 to most of the 2022 season.

== Sponsorship ==
Period	Kit manufacturer	Shirt sponsor
2016–2018	(United States) Nike	Optim Orthopedics
2019–2023	(Germany) Adidas	Optim Orthopedics
2024	(Germany) Puma	Mill Creek Construction
2025–present	(Germany) Puma	SubAir Sport

== Record ==
=== Year-by-year ===
As of February 23, 2026

Season	League	P	W	L	D	GF	GA	Pts	Pos	Playoffs	US Open Cup	Top Scorer ^{1}		Head coach
Season	League	P	W	L	D	GF	GA	Pts	Pos	Playoffs	US Open Cup	Player	Goals	Head coach
2016	PDL	14	6	5	3	22	18	21	5th, South Atlantic	Did not qualify	Ineligible	(England) Sam Lofts	4	(United States) Ben Freakley
2017	PDL	14	7	3	4	34	17	25	4th, South Atlantic	Did not qualify	DNQ	(United States) Jamie Merriam	9	(United States) John Miglarese
2018	PDL	14	11	0	3	30	10	36	1st, Deep South	Conference Semifinals	2R	(Italy) Marco Micaletto	4	(United States) John Miglarese
2019	USL1	28	9	10	9	32	34	37	6th	Did not qualify	2R	(Italy) Marco Micaletto	8	(United States) John Miglarese
2020	USL1	16	5	7	4	19	22	19	8th	Did not qualify	Not held	(Spain) Nil Vinyals	4	(United States) John Miglarese (2–4–4) (Scotland) Ian Cameron (3–3–0)
2021	USL1	28	8	14	6	36	47	30	11th	Did not qualify	Not Held	(Italy) Marco Micaletto	11	(Scotland) Ian Cameron
2022	USL1	30	12	9	9	42	40	45	3rd	Champions	R32	(England) Kazaiah Sterling	13	(Scotland) Ian Cameron
2023	USL1	32	12	14	6	55	56	42	7th	Did not qualify	3R	(England) Kazaiah Sterling	13	(Scotland) Ian Cameron
2024	USL1	22	4	10	8	33	42	20	10th	Did not qualify	R32	(Argentina) Sebastián Vivas	8	(Scotland) Ian Cameron
2025	USL1	30	13	11	6	55	47	45	6th	Quarterfinals	3R	(Barbados) Niall Reid-Stephen	13	(Scotland) Ian Cameron (4–10–4) (Republic of Ireland) Mark McKeever (9–1–2)

1. Top Scorer includes statistics from league matches only.

=== Head coaches ===
As of October 8, 2025

- Includes Regular Season, Playoffs & U.S. Open Cup. Excludes friendlies.

Coach	Nationality	Start	End	G	W	L	D	GF	GA	Win %
Ben Freakley	United States	2016	January 11, 2017	14	6	5	3	22	18	42.86
John Miglarese	United States	January 11, 2017	September 18, 2020	70	30	19	21	109	80	42.86
Ian Cameron	Scotland	September 18, 2020	August 8, 2025	104	41	42	21	156	159	39.42
Mark McKeever	Ireland	August 8, 2025	Present	12	9	2	1	30	12	75.00

== Players and staff ==
=== Final roster ===
As of October 31, 2025

Note: Flags indicate national team as defined under FIFA eligibility rules; some limited exceptions apply. Players may hold more than one non-FIFA nationality.

No.	Pos.	Nation	Player
1	GK	USA	Austin Pack
4	DF	USA	Thabo Nare
5	DF	MDA	Anatolie Prepeliță
6	DF	PUR	Callum Stretch
7	MF	BRB	Niall Reid-Stephen
8	MF	BRA	Gabriel Cabral
9	FW	ARG	Sebastian Vivas
10	FW	USA	Taylor Gray
11	FW	USA	Jonathan Nyandjo
13	GK	USA	Sam Jones

No.	Pos.	Nation	Player
14	MF	ISR	Alon Drey
19	FW	ISR	Yaniv Bazini
23	DF	USA	Makel Rasheed
26	DF	TAN	Jackson Kasanzu
28	MF	USA	Aaron Walker
30	MF	USA	Conor Doyle
33	DF	USA	Joseph Perez
58	DF	USA	Oscar Jimenez
71	MF	SOM	Handwalla Bwana
72	DF	USA	Finnley O'Brien

1. USL Academy Contract

=== Technical staff ===
As of October 8th, 2025

- (Republic of Ireland) Mark McKeever – Head Coach
- (Scotland) Jordan Bell – Associate Head Coach
- (United States) Zane Barnes – Assistant & Goalkeeping Coach

=== Front office ===
As of February 6, 2024

- (United States) Tom Valcke – Senior Director, Franchise Development
- (United States) Michael Blackmon – VP, The Tormenta Group
- (United States) John Schlieman – Senior VP, Corporate Partnerships
- (United States) Colt Carver – Senior Director, Soccer Operations
- (United States) Camryn Brooks – Coordinator, Soccer Operations
- (United States) Loren Kersey – Coordinator, Soccer Operations
- (United States) Colby Beard – Coordinator, Ticket Sales and Service
- (United States) Sally Scott – Senior Director, Ticketing and Fan Engagement
- (United States) Johnnie Sanchez – Coordinator, Academy Recruitment
- (United States) Joleen Tomlinson – Team Chef
- (United States) Reggie Hodges – Supervisor, Grounds
- (United States) Donald Roberts – Director, Facilities
- (United States) Khristina Harper – Director of Accounting
- (United States) Lindsay Paquette – Executive Staff
- (United States) Lisa Lee – Executive Staff
- (United States) Brad Nein – VP, Tormenta FC Academy

== Tormenta FC 2 ==
In January 2019, the team announced that it would continue to field a team in USL League Two while also playing professionally in USL League One. The team, Tormenta FC 2, continues to play in the Deep South Division and has won the conference once in 2019. During its inaugural season, the team won the Southern Conference for the first time in organization history.

The 2 team has also qualified for two U.S. Open Cup tournaments in 2019 and 2020, with the latter being cancelled and the tournament spot being transferred to 2021.

The club announced in January 2022 that Tormenta 2 would take a one-year hiatus from USL League Two in order for the club to focus on developing its academy.

== Honors ==
- USL League One
  - Playoffs Winners: 2022
- USL League Two
  - Deep South Division Champion: 2018

=== Player honors ===
Year	Pos	Player	Country	Honor
USL Premier Development League
2016	D	Peyton Ericson	USA	All-Eastern Conference Team
2018	M	Marco Micaletto	ITA	All-League Team; All-Southern Conference Team
2018	M	Toni Soler	ESP	All-Southern Conference Team
USL League One
2019	D	Conner Antley	USA	Defender of the Year; All-League First Team
2019	D	Mikie Rowe	IRE	Goal of the Year
2020	M	Marco Micaletto	ITA	All-League Second Team
2021	M	Marco Micaletto	ITA	All-League First Team
2022	M	Adrian Billhardt	GER	Comeback Player of the Year
2022	D	Jake Dengler	USA	All-League Second Team
2022	M	Gabriel Cabral	BRA	All-League Second Team
2022	F	Kazaiah Sterling	ENG	All-League Second Team
2023	M	Jackson Khoury	LBN	Young Player of the Year
2024	F	Pedro Fonseca	BRA	All-League Second Team
2025	F	Niall Reid-Stephen	BAR	All-League First Team
