= 2026 New York Cosmos season =

New York Cosmos
- Owner: Baye Adofo-Wilson (majority); Paterson Restoration Corporation; Erik Stover; Giuseppe Rossi; Rocco B. Commisso
- Chairman: Baye Adofo-Wilson
- Head coach: Davide Corti
- Stadium: Hinchliffe Stadium
- U.S. Open Cup: Ineligible
- USL Cup: Group Stage
- Top goalscorer: League: (United States) Ajmeer Spengler (11 Goals); All: (Uruguay) Sebastián Guenzatti (United States) Ajmeer Spengler (11 Goals)
- Highest home attendance: 4,099 vs Portland Hearts of Pine March 14
- Lowest home attendance: 813 vs Spokane Velocity October 21
- Average home league attendance: 1,497, with USL Cup 1,453
- Biggest win: New York Cosmos 2–0 Fort Wayne FC March 28; Corpus Christi FC 0–2 New York Cosmos August 19; Fort Wayne FC 2–4 New York Cosmos September 5
- Biggest defeat: AV Alta FC 4–0 New York Cosmos May 13

The 2026 New York Cosmos season was the inaugural season in the third incarnation of the club's existence as well as their first in USL League One, the third-tier of American soccer. Including all Cosmos iterations, this is the 22nd season of a professional soccer club bearing the Cosmos name.

== Players and staff ==
=== Current roster ===
As of August 12, 2026

Note: Flags indicate national team as defined under FIFA eligibility rules; some limited exceptions apply. Players may hold more than one non-FIFA nationality.

No.	Pos.	Nation	Player
1	GK	USA	Derrek Chan
2	DF	USA	Massimo Morabito
3	DF	USA	Luis Del Rio
3	DF	USA	Stalyn Acosta
4	DF	ISR	Michael Chilaka
5	MF	GUA	Nestor Cabrera
6	DF	USA	Anderson Holt
7	MF	USA	Leo Guarino
8	MF	USA	Ajmeer Spengler
11	FW	USA	Nick Zielonka
13	FW	URU	Sebastián Guenzatti (captain)
14	MF	USA	Tino Puentes
15	MF	USA	Ozzie Ramos
16	DF	USA	Davey Mason
17	DF	ITA	Davide Galazzini
18	FW	FRA	Christian Koffi

No.	Pos.	Nation	Player
19	FW	USA	Julien Lacher
19	FW	GAM	Lamin Jawneh
20	DF	USA	Nick Mendonca
21	DF	USA	Braeden Backus
22	FW	USA	Patrick Bohui
23	DF	ITA	Davide Materazzi
24	DF	USA	Will Noecker
25	DF	USA	Jordan Chavez
28	MF	USA	Justin Milovanov
29	GK	USA	Boris Del Valle*
30	GK	USA	Tristan Stephani
33	MF	NED	Darren Sidoel
36	MF	USA	William Black
—	MF	BAN	Shamit Shome

Asterisk denotes player-coach.

=== Retired numbers ===
The original New York Cosmos retired No. 10 for Pelé in 1977, while the New York Cosmos (2013–2020) retired No. 9 for Giorgio Chinaglia in 2014. Both numbers remain retired by the current iteration of the New York Cosmos.

No.	Position	Player	Nation	Tenure with original club	Ref
9	Forward	Giorgio Chinaglia	Italy	1976–1983	
10	Forward	Pelé	Brazil	1975–1977	

=== Technical staff ===
As of January 22, 2026

Position	Name
Head of Soccer	(Italy) Giuseppe Rossi
Head Coach	(Italy) Davide Corti
Assistant Coach	(Italy) Donato Curci (United States) Mike Gravinese
Head Goalkeeping Coach	(United States) Boris Del Valle
Head of Scout and Manager of Youth Partnerships	(Colombia) José Angulo
Team Administrator/Player Care Officer	(United States) Artian Plaha
Team Analyst	(Canada) Simon Triantafillou
Equipment Manager	Artie Verdi

=== Administrative officials ===
As of January 22, 2026

Position	Name
Chairperson and Managing Partner	(United States) Baye Adofo-Wilson
Vice Chairman	(Italy) Giuseppe Rossi
Chief Executive Officer	(Italy) Erik Stover

== Transfers ==
=== In ===
Date	Position	Number	Name	from	Type	Fee	Ref.
November 21, 2025	FW	13	(Uruguay) Sebastián Guenzatti	(United States) Detroit City FC	Signing	NA	
December 3, 2025	MF	27	(Ecuador) Josué Manzano	(Ecuador) Atlético JBG	Signing	NA	
December 3, 2025	DF	23	(Italy) Davide Materazzi	(United States) Lionsbridge FC	Signing	NA	
December 3, 2025	FW	14	(United States) Tino Puentes	(United States) Morris Elite SC	Signing	NA	
December 3, 2025	FW	11	(United States) Nick Zielonka	(United States) Hudson Valley Hammers	Signing	NA	
December 12, 2025	GK	1	(United States) Derrek Chan	(Germany) Mülheimer FC 97	Signing	NA	
December 12, 2025	DF	4	(United States) Marcelo Lage	(United States) Richmond Kickers	Signing	NA	
December 12, 2025	MF	8	(United States) Ajmeer Spengler	(United States) Texoma FC	Signing	NA	
December 17, 2025	DF	17	(Italy) Davide Galazzini	(Italy) Albalonga	Signing	NA	
December 17, 2025	MF	33	(Netherlands) Darren Sidoel	(Iceland) Grindavík	Signing	NA	
December 17, 2025	MF	20	(United States) Nick Mendonca	(United States) Chattanooga FC	Signing	NA	
December 19, 2025	DF	16	(United States) Davey Mason	(United States) Texoma FC	Signing	NA	
December 19, 2025	MF	5	(Guatemala) Nestor Cabrera	(United States) Rutgers Scarlet Knights	Signing	NA	
December 19, 2025	FW	19	(United States) Julien Lacher	(United States) NYCFC II	Signing	NA	
December 19, 2025	MF	21	(United States) Braeden Backus	(United States) Westchester SC	Signing	NA	
December 23, 2025	DF	2	(United States) Massimo Morabito	(United States) FC Delco Academy	Signing	NA	
December 23, 2025	MF	28	(United States) Justin Milovanov	(United States) FC Tucson	Signing	NA	
January 7, 2026	FW	18	(France) Christian Koffi	(United States) Huntsville City FC	Signing	NA	
January 7, 2026	DF	3	(United States) Luis Del Rio	(United States) Doral Soccer Academy	Signing	NA	
January 16, 2026	DF	6	(United States) Anderson Holt	(United States) Union Omaha	Transfer	NA	
January 16, 2026	FW	22	(United States) Patrick Bohui	(Portugal) Naval 1893	Signing	NA	
January 16, 2026	GK	30	(United States) Tristan Stephani	(United States) Chicago Nation FC	Signing	NA	
February 14, 2026	MF	7	(United States) Leo Guarino	(United States) NYCFC II	Signing	NA	
March 13, 2026	DF	25	(United States) Jordan Chavez	(United States) Texoma FC	Signing	NA	
March 13, 2026	DF	24	(United States) Will Noecker	(United States) North Carolina State Wolfpack	25 day contract	NA	
May 6, 2026	GK	13	(United States) Javier Garcia	(United States) Athletic Club Boise	Transfer	NA	
May 14, 2026	FW	19	(The Gambia) Lamin Jawneh	(United States) Texoma FC	Transfer	NA	
July 7, 2026	MF	91	(Jamaica) Chevone Marsh	(United States) Greenville Triumph SC	Transfer	NA	
July 23, 2026	DF	4	(Israel) Michael Chilaka	(Israel) Maccabi Jaffa	Transfer	NA	
August 3, 2026	MF	15	(United States) Ozzie Ramos	(United States) Texoma FC	Signing	NA	
August 7, 2026	DF	3	(United States) Stalyn Acosta	(Puerto Rico) Ponce FC	Signing	NA	
August 12, 2026	MF	12	(Bangladesh) Shamit Shome	(Canada) Cavalry FC	Signing	NA	

=== Out ===
Date	Position	Number	Name	Reason	to	Type	Fee	Ref.
July 1, 2026	MF	27	(Ecuador) Josué Manzano	Loaned out	(Ecuador) Cuenca Juniors	Loan	NA	
August 3, 2026	FW	91	(Jamaica) Chevone Marsh	Violation of Team Rules	NA	NA	NA	

== Non-competitive fixtures ==
=== Friendlies ===
January 23 Preseason	(Mexico) Club Tijuana	4–1	New York Cosmos	Tijuana, Baja California
2:00 PM EDT	El Ghezouani; Abreu; Vitinho; González	Club Tijuana Report; Report w/ Cosmos Info	Spengler	Stadium: Estadio Caliente

February 11 Preseason	New York Cosmos	v	CT United FC	Paterson, New Jersey
		Report		Stadium: Hinchliffe Stadium
Note: No Result Published

February 17 Preseason	New York Cosmos	4–2	(Canada) FC Supra du Québec	Paterson, New Jersey
1:00 PM EDT		Report		Stadium: Hinchliffe Stadium
Note: No Result Published officially, later reported by third party

February 21 Preseason	Philadelphia Union II	3–4	New York Cosmos	Chester, Pennsylvania
3:00 PM		Union Announcement; HRB Report		Stadium: WSFS Bank Sportsplex
Note: No Result Published officially, later reported by third party

February 28 Preseason	New York Cosmos	2–0	FC Motown	Paterson, New Jersey
1:00 PM EDT	Guenzatti 23'; Spengler 31'	Report		Stadium: Hinchliffe Stadium; Attendance: 150
Note: Supporter's only friendly

March 7 Preseason	New York Cosmos	4–2	NY Renegades FC	Paterson, New Jersey
2:00 PM EDT				Stadium: Hinchliffe Stadium
Note: No Result Published officially

June 24 Kick ALS Cup	American Soccer Club New York	2–1	New York Cosmos	Stony Brook, New York
5:00 PM EDT	Rosero 33'; Walker 45+'	Report 1	Marsh 55'	Stadium: LaValle Stadium; Attendance: 1,238

June 28 International Friendly	New York Cosmos	1–2	(Mexico) Santos Laguna	Paterson, New Jersey
5:00 PM EDT	Guenzatti 65'	Report 1	González 8'; Di Yorio 40'	Stadium: Hinchliffe Stadium; Attendance: 1,036

== Competitive fixtures ==
=== Regular Season ===
==== Standings ====
Pos	Team	Pld	W	L	T	GF	GA	GD	Pts	Qualification
1	Charlotte Independence (S, C)	32	20	6	6	74	46	+28	66	Playoffs
2	Union Omaha	32	19	8	5	54	34	+20	62	Playoffs
3	AC Boise	32	17	8	7	51	41	+10	58	Playoffs
4	Forward Madison FC	32	16	8	8	54	30	+24	56	Playoffs
5	Spokane Velocity FC	32	16	10	6	50	44	+6	54	Playoffs
6	One Knoxville SC	32	15	8	9	52	36	+16	54	Playoffs
7	Chattanooga Red Wolves SC	32	14	13	5	51	45	+6	47	Playoffs
8	FC Naples	32	14	14	4	39	46	−7	46	Playoffs
9	Fort Wayne FC	32	12	11	9	47	42	+5	45	
10	Westchester SC	32	11	14	7	55	51	+4	40	
11	Sarasota Paradise	32	11	14	7	49	51	−2	40	
12	Corpus Christi FC	32	9	13	10	36	51	−15	37	
13	AV Alta FC	32	8	14	10	40	48	−8	34	
14	Portland Hearts of Pine	32	8	14	10	48	58	−10	34	
15	Greenville Triumph SC	32	8	18	6	37	60	−23	30	
16	New York Cosmos	32	7	19	6	40	66	−26	27	
17	Richmond Kickers	32	7	20	5	37	65	−28	26	

Source: USL League One
(C) Champions; (S) Players' Shield winner

==== Results summary ====
Overall								Home						Away					
Pld	W	D	L	GF	GA	GD	Pts	W	D	L	GF	GA	GD	W	D	L	GF	GA	GD
29	7	4	18	36	59	−23	25	5	2	6	17	20	−3	2	2	12	19	39	−20

Last updated: October 10, 2026.
Source: Match reports

==== Matches ====
March 14 1	New York Cosmos	1–3	Portland Hearts of Pine	Paterson, New Jersey
2:00 PM EDT	Sidoel 73'	Report	Georgallides 56'; Kidd (yellow card) 60'; Barbosa (yellow card) 64'; Green (yellow card) 65'; Wada 76'; Camara 86'	Stadium: Hinchliffe Stadium; Attendance: 4,099; Referee: Luis Arroyo

March 21 2	Spokane Velocity	3–1	New York Cosmos	Spokane, Washington
3:00 PM ET	Denton 25'; Miller (yellow card) 29'; Gil 39' (pen.); Brett 43'; Spielman (yellow card) 70'; Merancio (yellow card) 77'	Report	Morabito (yellow card) 27'; Stephani (yellow card) 39'; Chavez (yellow card) 40'; Milovanov 48'; Spengler (yellow card) 66'; Guenzatti (yellow card) 80'	Stadium: One Spokane Stadium; Attendance: 1,849; Referee: Kalilou Jarju

March 25 3	Greenville Triumph SC	3–2	New York Cosmos	Greenville, South Carolina
7:00 PM ET	Fricke 3'; Chavez 57' (o.g.); Robles 62'; Evans (yellow card) 83'	Report	Spengler 25'; Mendonca 77'; Holt (yellow card) 90+1'; Sidoel (yellow card) 90+2'	Stadium: Eugene E. Stone III Stadium; Attendance: 1,756; Referee: Stefan Perri

March 28 4	New York Cosmos	2–0	Fort Wayne FC	Paterson, New Jersey
2:00 PM EDT	Guenzatti 21'; Galazzini 50' (yellow card) 83'; Mendonca (yellow card) 74'; Koffi (yellow card) 76'	Report	Solis (yellow card) 24'; Sproat (yellow card) 37'; Ricol (yellow card) 72'; Oyetunde (yellow card) 89'; Dias (yellow card) 90+3'	Stadium: Hinchliffe Stadium; Attendance: 1,146; Referee: Matthew Corrigan

April 3 5	New York Cosmos	3–2	Charlotte Independence	Paterson, New Jersey
7:00 PM EDT	Spengler 6' (pen.), 22' (pen.), 81' (pen.); Mendonca (yellow card) 44'; Milovanov (yellow card) 45+7'; Noecker (red card) 75'	Report	Ortiz 13'; Manin (yellow card) 20'; Dimick (yellow card) 45+2'; Amaya 45+8'; Lyons (yellow card) 64'	Stadium: Hinchliffe Stadium; Attendance: 1,170; Referee: Muhammad Kaleia

April 19 6	New York Cosmos	2–2	Forward Madison FC	Paterson, New Jersey
2:00 PM EDT	Koffi (yellow card) 37'; Spengler 49'; Guenzatti 50'	Report	Kanyane 22' (red card) 32'; Carmichael 34'; Ngoubou (yellow card) 74'; Torres (yellow card) 90+2'	Stadium: Hinchliffe Stadium; Attendance: 931; Referee: Jeremy Scheer

May 2 7	Portland Hearts of Pine	3–1	New York Cosmos	Portland, Maine
5:00 PM ET	Kamara 10'; Wright 18' 49'; Drack (yellow card) 33'; Poon-Angeron (yellow card) 81'; Barbosa (yellow card) 87'; Green (yellow card) 90+3'	Report	Chavez (yellow card) 16'; Noecker (yellow card) 19'; Milovanov (yellow card) 57'; Guenzatti 83'	Stadium: Fitzpatrick Stadium; Attendance: 6,162; Referee: Carlos Rodriguez

May 23 8	AV Alta FC	4–0	New York Cosmos	Lancaster, California
10:30 PM ET	Antwi 8'; Aoumaich 43', 55' (yellow card) 60'; Higareda 71'; Ortiz (yellow card) 79'	Report	Guenzatti (yellow card) 57'; Mendonca (yellow card) 83'; Bohui (yellow card) 88'	Stadium: Lancaster Municipal Stadium; Attendance: 4,003; Referee: Anthony Almeida

May 27 9	New York Cosmos	1–2	Union Omaha	Paterson, New Jersey
7:00 PM EDT	Mendonca (yellow card) 45+2'; Guenzatti (yellow card) 75'; Holt 80'; Bohui (yellow card) 90+3'	Report	Owusu (yellow card) 24'; Guediri (yellow card) 31'; Malone (yellow card) 49'; Gómez 60'; Tekiela 90+4'	Stadium: Hinchliffe Stadium; Attendance: 2,684; Referee: Walterson Torchon

May 30 10	Sarasota Paradise	2–1	New York Cosmos	Lakewood Ranch, Florida
7:30 PM ET	Valentine (yellow card) 22'; Watters (yellow card) 62'; Bolduc 68'; Rosa 78'; Amedeka (yellow card) 84'	Report	Spengler (yellow card) 13' (goal) 50'; Galazzini (yellow card) 42'; Guenzatti (yellow card) 57'; Chavez (yellow card) 90'	Stadium: Premier Sports Campus; Attendance: 1,701; Referee: Richonne Clark

June 13 11	One Knoxville SC	3–1	New York Cosmos	Knoxville, Tennessee
7:00 PM ET	Diene 19'; Krioutchenkov 35'; Baker (yellow card) 70'; Gøling 73'	Report	Galazzini (yellow card) 12' (goal) 51'; Noecker (yellow card) 19'; Garcia (yellow card) 26'	Stadium: Covenant Health Park; Attendance: 3,802; Referee: Elvis Osmanovic

June 20 12	Forward Madison FC	3–1	New York Cosmos	Madison, Wisconsin
8:00 PM ET	K. Carmichael (yellow card) 17'; R. Carmichael 25'; Torres 28'; Toure (yellow card) 38'; Castro 48' (yellow card) 56'; Karamoko (yellow card) 85'	Report	Spengler (yellow card) 73'; Guenzatti 76'; Chavez (yellow card) 85'	Stadium: Breese Stevens Field; Attendance: 3,449; Referee: Cristian Campo

June 24 13	New York Cosmos	v	South Georgia Tormenta FC	Paterson, New Jersey
7:00 PM EDT				Stadium: Hinchliffe Stadium
Note: Game cancelled following South Georgia Tormenta FC's withdrawal from USL League One.

July 4 14	New York Cosmos	0–3	Greenville Triumph SC	Paterson, New Jersey
7:00 PM EDT	Milovanov (yellow card) 78'; Guenzatti (yellow card) 79'	Report	Herrera (yellow card) 17'; Fricke 45+7'; Akio (yellow card) 55' (goal) 57', 64'	Stadium: Hinchliffe Stadium; Attendance: 968; Referee: Muhammad Hassan

July 8 15	New York Cosmos	1–0	FC Naples	Paterson, New Jersey
7:00 PM EDT	Marsh 56'; Guenzatti (yellow card) 69'; Chavez (yellow card) 90+3'	Report	Yearwood (yellow card) 10'; Osorio (yellow card) 82'	Stadium: Hinchliffe Stadium; Attendance: 1,505; Referee: Benjamin Meyer

July 18 16	New York Cosmos	0–0	Corpus Christi FC	Paterson, New Jersey
7:00 PM EDT	Marsh (yellow card) 20'	Report	Abeal (yellow card) 4'; Medina (yellow card) 61'; Zayed (yellow card) 70'	Stadium: Hinchliffe Stadium; Attendance: 1,037; Referee: Kyle Johnston

July 22 17	Westchester SC	3–0	New York Cosmos	Mount Vernon, New York
7:00 PM ET	Pierre 7'; Timchenko (yellow card) 67'; Evans 76'; McGlynn 83'	Report	Cabrera (yellow card) 29'; Chavez (yellow card) 85'	Stadium: The Stadium at Memorial Field; Attendance: 2,637; Referee: Nicholas Strednak

July 25 18	New York Cosmos	1–2	Athletic Club Boise	Paterson, New Jersey
7:00 PM EDT	Marsh (yellow card) 23'; Chavez (yellow card) 52'; Guenzatti 90+5'	Report	Bodily 54' (pen.); Crull 60'; Gasso (yellow card) 74'	Stadium: Hinchliffe Stadium; Attendance: 2,126; Referee: Braeden Frey

August 1 19	South Georgia Tormenta FC	v	New York Cosmos	Statesboro, Georgia
				Stadium: Tormenta Stadium
Note: Game cancelled following South Georgia Tormenta FC's withdrawal from USL League One.

August 5 20	Richmond Kickers	2–0	New York Cosmos	Richmond, Virginia
7:00 PM ET	O'Malley (yellow card) 22'; Espinal 33', 53'; Sasankhah (yellow card) 78'	Report	Spengler (yellow card) 45'; Bohui (yellow card) 57'; Galazzini (yellow card) 70'	Stadium: City Stadium; Attendance: 3,878; Referee: Anthony Sobolevsky

August 8 21	New York Cosmos	P–P	Spokane Velocity	Paterson, New Jersey
7:00 PM EDT				Stadium: Hinchliffe Stadium

August 15 22	New York Cosmos	1–0	AV Alta FC	Paterson, New Jersey
7:00 PM EDT	Ramos (yellow card) 39'; Guenzatti 61'	Report	Ortiz (yellow card) 52'; Kleiban (yellow card) 54'; Relerford (yellow card) 58'; Pehlivanov (yellow card) 67'; Bahena (yellow card) 86'	Stadium: Hinchliffe Stadium; Attendance: 1,174; Referee: Alejo Calume

August 19 23	Corpus Christi FC	0–2	New York Cosmos	Corpus Christi, Texas
8:30 PM ET	Zayed (yellow card) 41'; Gomez (yellow card) 59'; Roscoe (yellow card) 89'	Report	Jawneh (yellow card) 9' (goal) 25'; Spengler 76'; Sidoel (yellow card) 89'; Stephani (yellow card) 90+2'; Chavez (yellow card) 90+4'	Stadium: Cabaniss Athletic Complex; Attendance: 1,150; Referee: Jay Schlesinger

August 22 24	Chattanooga Red Wolves SC	3–3	New York Cosmos	East Ridge, Tennessee
7:00 PM ET	Hernández 1'; Adewole 32'; Lelin 60'; Knapp (yellow card) 86'; Apolinar (yellow card) 90+1'	Report	Guenzatti 45+2'; Galazzini (yellow card) 49'; Cabrera 56'; Spengler 77'; Bohui (yellow card) 90+8'	Stadium: CHI Memorial Stadium; Attendance: 1,152; Referee: Jake Larson

August 29 25	Union Omaha	1–1	New York Cosmos	Omaha, Nebraska
8:00 PM ET	Vargas 9'; Wootton (yellow card) 24'; Kallman (yellow card) 40'; Lawrence (yellow card) 45+1'; Owusu (yellow card) 60'; Guediri (yellow card) 90+4'	Report	Guenzatti 35'; Ramos (yellow card) 43'	Stadium: Morrison Stadium; Attendance: 2,851; Referee: José Lara

September 2 26	New York Cosmos	1–2	Sarasota Paradise	Paterson, New Jersey
7:00 PM EDT	Chavez (yellow card) 39'; Garcia (yellow card) 73'; Jawneh 83'; Ljucovic (yellow card) 89'	Report	Walker (yellow card) 14'; Bolanos (yellow card) 33'; Krueger 51'; Rosa 77'; Bryant (yellow card) 90+6'	Stadium: Hinchliffe Stadium; Attendance: 1,505; Referee: Natalie Simon

September 5 27	Fort Wayne FC	2–4	New York Cosmos	Fort Wayne, Indiana
7:00 PM ET	Jordan (yellow card) 28'; Rempel (yellow card) 50'; Becher 66'; Armas (yellow card) 74'; Awoudor 90+2' (pen.)	Report	Cabrera (yellow card) 21'; Ramos (yellow card) 34'; Jawneh 44', 71'; Chavez 45+2' (yellow card) 52'; Sproat 47' (o.g.)	Stadium: Fort Wayne FC Park; Attendance: 4,294; Referee: Braeden Frey

September 11 28	Athletic Club Boise	2–1	New York Cosmos	Garden City, Idaho
7:00 PM ET	Bodily 10'; Moshobane 81'; Brito (yellow card) 84'	Report	Holt (yellow card) 39'; Cabrera (yellow card) 72'; Guenzatti 90+4'	Stadium: Stadium at Expo Idaho; Attendance: 7,232; Referee: Trevor Wiseman

September 19 29	New York Cosmos	1–2	Westchester SC	Paterson, New Jersey
5:00 PM EDT	Chavez (yellow card) 10'; Spengler 82'; Koffi (yellow card) 85'	Report	Blommestijn 45+2'; McGlynn 90+8' (yellow card) 90+9'	Stadium: Hinchliffe Stadium; Attendance: 1,310; Referee: John Griggs

September 27 30	New York Cosmos	3–2	Richmond Kickers	Paterson, New Jersey
5:00 PM EDT	Spengler 15', 90+5' (pen.) (yellow card) 90+8'; Jawneh 21' (yellow card) 60'; Chilaka (yellow card) 62'; Ramos (yellow card) 74'	Report	O'Malley (yellow card) 18'; Vazquez 32'; Layton (yellow card) 41'; Vinberg (yellow card) 62' (goal) 66'; Hanson (yellow card) 89'; Dourado (yellow card) 90+2'	Stadium: Hinchliffe Stadium; Attendance: 820; Referee: Laadi Issaka
Note: Match was moved to sunday due to inclement weather.

October 3 31	FC Naples	2–1	New York Cosmos	Naples, Florida
7:00 PM ET	Torrellas 21'; Ciss 69'; Likulia (yellow card) 90+4'	Report	Spengler (yellow card) 24'; Jawneh 49'; Ramos (yellow card) 65'	Stadium: Paradise Coast Sports Complex; Attendance: 3,057; Referee: Deny Kulasinac

October 10 32	Charlotte Independence	3–0	New York Cosmos	Matthews, North Carolina
7:00 PM ET	Jaime 18'; Skinner 41'; Marou 45+2'; Levy (yellow card) 85'; Coulibaly (yellow card) 90+5'	Report	Materazzi (yellow card) 59'	Stadium: Sportsplex at Matthews; Attendance: 658

October 17 33	New York Cosmos	0–3	One Knoxville SC	Paterson, New Jersey
4:00 PM EDT	Milovanov (yellow card) 23' (yellow-red card) 89'; Mendonca (yellow card) 44'; Chavez (yellow card) 79'	Report	Krioutchenkov 6'; Zarokostas (yellow card) 64'; Rosamilia (yellow card) 67'; Conway 73' (yellow card) 82'; Diene 90+4'	Stadium: Hinchliffe Stadium; Attendance: 1,124; Referee: Abdu-Razzaq Juma

October 21 21	New York Cosmos	3–3	Spokane Velocity	Paterson, New Jersey
7:36 PM EDT	Koffi 26'; Materazzi (yellow card) 31'; Jawneh (yellow card) 39'; Chan (yellow card) 56'; Ramos (yellow card) 56' (goal) 83'; Jawneh 59'	Report	Brett 57' (pen.); Lewis 69'; Spielman (yellow card) 77'; Gallardo (yellow card) 85'; John-Brown 90+10'	Stadium: Hinchliffe Stadium; Attendance: 813; Referee: Atahan Yaya
Note: match was delayed for 36 minutes.

October 24 34	New York Cosmos	1–1	Chattanooga Red Wolves SC	Paterson, New Jersey
4:00 PM EDT	Ramos (yellow card) 21'; Guenzatti 30'	Report	Kelly 37'; Kinzner (yellow card) 71'; Acosta (yellow card) 86'	Stadium: Hinchliffe Stadium; Attendance: 1,543; Referee: John Matto

=== USL Cup ===
==== Standings — Group 5 ====
Pos	Lg	Team	Pld	W	PKW	PKL	L	GF	GA	GD	Pts	Qualification
1	USLC	Hartford Athletic	4	3	0	1	0	8	2	+6	10	Advance to knockout stage
2	USLC	Rhode Island FC	4	1	2	0	1	5	3	+2	7	
3	USLC	Brooklyn FC	4	2	0	1	1	9	4	+5	7	
4	USL1	Portland Hearts of Pine	4	1	1	1	1	6	9	−3	6	
5	USL1	New York Cosmos	4	1	0	1	2	5	10	−5	4	
6	USL1	Westchester SC	4	0	1	0	3	5	10	−5	2	

==== Results summary ====
Overall								Home						Away					
Pld	W	D	L	GF	GA	GD	Pts	W	D	L	GF	GA	GD	W	D	L	GF	GA	GD
0	0	0	0	0	0	0	0	0	0	0	0	0	0	0	0	0	0	0	0

Last updated: March 1, 2026.
Source: Match reports

==== Matches ====
===== Group stage =====
April 25 Group Stage	New York Cosmos	0–3	Brooklyn FC	Paterson, New Jersey
2:00 PM EDT	Chavez (yellow card) 30'; Mendonca (yellow card) 45'; Milovanov (yellow card) 73'; Cabrera (yellow card) 80' (yellow-red card) 90+1'; Guenzatti (yellow card) 81'	Report	Nishikawa (yellow card) 34'; Obregón 35'; Alves 39'; Kanté 43'; Okiyoshi (yellow card) 89'	Stadium: Hinchliffe Stadium; Attendance: 1,040; Referee: Lauren Aldrich

May 15 Group Stage	Westchester SC	2–3	New York Cosmos	Mount Vernon, New York
7:00 PM ET	Armas (yellow card) 36'; Blommestijn 47'; Mackic 69'; Jiménez (yellow card) 85'; Bouman (yellow card) 89'	Report	Mendonca (yellow card) 35' (goal) 81'; Guenzatti 43'; Bohui (yellow card) 85'; Koffi 90+4'	Stadium: The Stadium at Memorial Field; Attendance: 3,257; Referee: Dorian Del Toro

June 6 Group Stage	New York Cosmos	1–4	Hartford Athletic	Paterson, New Jersey
7:00 PM EDT	Puentes (red card) 15'; Bohui (yellow card) 44'; Sidoel (yellow card) 45+2'; Materazzi (yellow card) 57'; Chavez 87'; Guenzatti (yellow card) 90+3'	Report	Williams 11'; Coffey 40'; Samadia 45'; Siaha (yellow card) 45+2' (red card) 63'; Diz (yellow card) 76'; Hernández 88'	Stadium: Hinchliffe Stadium; Attendance: 1,159; Referee: John Matto

July 11 Group Stage	Portland Hearts of Pine	1–1 (4–2 p)	New York Cosmos	Portland, Maine
7:00 PM ET	Hersi (yellow card) 28'; Gonzalez 80'; Barbosa (yellow card) 85'	Report	Sidoel (yellow card) 34'; Marsh 60'	Stadium: Fitzpatrick Stadium; Attendance: 6,231; Referee: Joe Surgan
	Penalties
	Drack (penalty scored); Barbosa (penalty scored); Huck (penalty scored); Gonzalez (penalty scored)		(penalty missed) Spengler; (penalty scored) Zielonka; (penalty scored) Mendonca; (penalty missed) Guenzatti

== Squad statistics ==
As of Match played April 4, 2026

=== Appearances and goals ===
No.	Pos	Nat	Player	Total		USL League One		USL Cup		USL League One Playoffs	
No.	Pos	Nat	Player	Apps	Goals	Apps	Goals	Apps	Goals	Apps	Goals
1	GK	(United States) USA	Derrek Chan	5	0	4+0	0	1+0	0	0+0	0
2	DF	(United States) USA	Massimo Morabito	22	0	11+7	0	3+1	0	0+0	0
3	DF	(United States) USA	Luis Del Rio	0	0	0+0	0	0+0	0	0+0	0
3	DF	(United States) USA	Stalyn Acosta	8	0	5+3	0	0+0	0	0+0	0
4	DF	(United States) USA	Marcelo Lage	0	0	0+0	0	0+0	0	0+0	0
4	DF	(Israel) ISR	Michael Chilaka	14	0	10+4	0	0+0	0	0+0	0
5	MF	(Guatemala) GUA	Nestor Cabrera	28	1	17+9	1	1+1	0	0+0	0
6	DF	(United States) USA	Anderson Holt	32	1	28+0	1	3+1	0	0+0	0
7	MF	(United States) USA	Leo Guarino	5	0	0+3	0	1+1	0	0+0	0
7	MF	(United States) USA	Frankie Ljucovic	17	0	16+1	0	0+0	0	0+0	0
8	MF	(United States) USA	Ajmeer Spengler	35	11	31+0	11	3+1	0	0+0	0
11	FW	(United States) USA	Nick Zielonka	31	0	6+21	0	3+1	0	0+0	0
12	MF	(Bangladesh) BAN	Shamit Shome	5	0	5+0	0	0+0	0	0+0	0
13	FW	(Uruguay) URU	Sebastián Guenzatti	35	10	31+0	9	3+1	1	0+0	0
14	FW	(United States) USA	Tino Puentes	16	0	1+13	0	1+1	0	0+0	0
15	MF	(United States) USA	Ozzie Ramos	14	1	14+0	1	0+0	0	0+0	0
16	DF	(United States) USA	Davey Mason	11	0	6+2	0	2+1	0	0+0	0
17	DF	(Italy) ITA	Davide Galazzini	18	2	9+8	2	1+0	0	0+0	0
18	FW	(France) FRA	Christian Koffi	17	2	13+1	1	3+0	1	0+0	0
19	FW	(The Gambia) GAM	Lamin Jawneh	23	7	21+1	7	1+0	0	0+0	0
19	FW	(United States) USA	Julien Lacher	5	0	0+4	0	0+1	0	0+0	0
20	MF	(United States) USA	Nick Mendonca	27	2	16+8	1	3+0	1	0+0	0
21	MF	(United States) USA	Braeden Backus	0	0	0+0	0	0+0	0	0+0	0
22	FW	(United States) USA	Patrick Bohui	18	0	5+10	0	1+2	0	0+0	0
23	DF	(Italy) ITA	Davide Materazzi	6	0	3+1	0	2+0	0	0+0	0
24	DF	(United States) USA	Will Noecker	18	0	10+5	0	3+0	0	0+0	0
25	DF	(United States) USA	Jordan Chavez	29	2	23+4	1	1+1	1	0+0	0
26	GK	(United States) USA	Javier Garcia	16	0	15+0	0	1+0	0	0+0	0
27	MF	(Ecuador) ECU	Josué Manzano	0	0	0+0	0	0+0	0	0+0	0
28	MF	(United States) USA	Justin Milovanov	29	1	15+12	1	2+0	0	0+0	0
29	GK	(United States) USA	Boris Del Valle	1	0	0+0	0	1+0	0	0+0	0
30	GK	(United States) USA	Tristan Stephani	13	0	12+0	0	1+0	0	0+0	0
33	MF	(Netherlands) NED	Darren Sidoel	21	1	12+7	1	2+0	0	0+0	0
36	MF	(United States) USA	William Black	0	0	0+0	0	0+0	0	0+0	0
91	MF	(Jamaica) JAM	Chevone Marsh	4	2	3+0	1	1+0	1	0+0	0

=== Top goalscorers ===
Rank	Position	Number	Name	USL1 season	USL Cup	USL League One Playoffs	Total
1	MF	8	(United States) Ajmeer Spengler	11	0	0	11
1	FW	13	(Uruguay) Sebastián Guenzatti	10	1	0	11
3	MF	19	(The Gambia) Lamin Jawneh	7	0	0	7
4	DF	17	(Italy) Davide Galazzini	2	0	0	2
4	FW	20	(France) Christian Koffi	1	1	0	2
4	MF	20	(United States) Nick Mendonca	1	1	0	2
4	DF	25	(United States) Jordan Chavez	1	1	0	2
4	MF	91	(Jamaica) Chevone Marsh	1	1	0	2
9	MF	5	(Guatemala) Nestor Cabrera	1	0	0	1
9	DF	6	(United States) Anderson Holt	1	0	0	1
9	MF	15	(United States) Ozzie Ramos	1	0	0	1
9	MF	28	(United States) Justin Milovanov	1	0	0	1
9	MF	33	(Netherlands) Darren Sidoel	1	0	0	1
9			Own Goals	1	0	0	1
Total				40	5	0	45

=== Assist scorers ===
Rank	Position	Number	Name	USL1 season	USL Cup	USL League One Playoffs	Total
1	MF	8	(United States) Ajmeer Spengler	11	2	0	13
2	FW	20	(France) Christian Koffi	2	0	0	2
3	FW	11	(United States) Nick Zielonka	2	0	0	2
3	MF	12	(Bangladesh) Shamit Shome	2	0	0	2
5	MF	5	(Guatemala) Nestor Cabrera	1	0	0	1
5	DF	6	(United States) Anderson Holt	1	0	0	1
5	MF	7	(United States) Frankie Ljucovic	1	0	0	1
5	FW	14	(United States) Tino Puentes	1	0	0	1
5	MF	15	(United States) Ozzie Ramos	1	0	0	1
5	MF	19	(The Gambia) Lamin Jawneh	1	0	0	1
5	FW	22	(United States) Patrick Bohui	1	0	0	1
5	MF	28	(United States) Justin Milovanov	1	0	0	1
5	MF	33	(Netherlands) Darren Sidoel	1	0	0	1
5	FW	13	(Uruguay) Sebastián Guenzatti	0	1	0	1
Total				27	3	0	30

=== Clean sheets ===
Rank	Name	USL1 season	USL Cup	Total
1	(United States) Tristan Stephani	3	0	3
2	(United States) Derrek Chan	1	0	1
2	(United States) Javier Garcia Jr.	1	0	1
Total		5	0	5

=== Disciplinary record ===
No.	Pos.	Player	USL League One regular season			USL Cup			USL League One Playoffs			Total		
No.	Pos.	Player	Yellow card	(yellow card) (yellow-red card)	Red card	Yellow card	(yellow card) (yellow-red card)	Red card	Yellow card	(yellow card) (yellow-red card)	Red card	Yellow card	(yellow card) (yellow-red card)	Red card
1	GK	(United States) Derrek Chan	1	0	0	0	0	0	0	0	0	1	0	0
2	DF	(United States) Massimo Morabito	1	0	0	0	0	0	0	0	0	1	0	0
3	DF	(United States) Luis Del Rio	0	0	0	0	0	0	0	0	0	0	0	0
4	DF	(United States) Marcelo Lage	0	0	0	0	0	0	0	0	0	0	0	0
4	DF	(Israel) Michael Chilaka	1	0	0	0	0	0	0	0	0	1	0	0
5	MF	(Guatemala) Nestor Cabrera	3	0	0	1	1	0	0	0	0	4	1	0
6	DF	(United States) Anderson Holt	2	0	0	0	0	0	0	0	0	2	0	0
7	MF	(United States) Leo Guarino	0	0	0	0	0	0	0	0	0	0	0	0
7	MF	(United States) Frankie Ljucovic	1	0	0	0	0	0	0	0	0	1	0	0
8	MF	(United States) Ajmeer Spengler	6	0	0	0	0	0	0	0	0	6	0	0
11	FW	(United States) Nick Zielonka	0	0	0	0	0	0	0	0	0	0	0	0
12	MF	(Bangladesh) Shamit Shome	0	0	0	0	0	0	0	0	0	0	0	0
13	FW	(Uruguay) Sebastián Guenzatti	6	0	0	2	0	0	0	0	0	8	0	0
14	FW	(United States) Tino Puentes	1	0	0	0	0	1	0	0	0	1	0	1
15	MF	(United States) Ozzie Ramos	7	0	0	0	0	0	0	0	0	7	0	0
16	DF	(United States) Davey Mason	0	0	0	0	0	0	0	0	0	0	0	0
17	DF	(Italy) Davide Galazzini	5	0	0	1	0	0	0	0	0	6	0	0
18	FW	(France) Christian Koffi	3	0	0	0	0	0	0	0	0	3	0	0
19	FW	(United States) Julien Lacher	0	0	0	0	0	0	0	0	0	0	0	0
19	FW	(The Gambia) Lamin Jawneh	3	0	0	0	0	0	0	0	0	3	0	0
20	MF	(United States) Nick Mendonca	5	0	0	2	0	0	0	0	0	7	0	0
21	MF	(United States) Braeden Backus	0	0	0	0	0	0	0	0	0	0	0	0
22	FW	(United States) Patrick Bohui	4	0	0	2	0	0	0	0	0	6	0	0
23	DF	(Italy) Davide Materazzi	2	0	0	0	0	0	0	0	0	2	0	0
24	DF	(United States) Will Noeker	2	0	1	0	0	0	0	0	0	2	0	1
25	DF	(United States) Jordan Chavez	12	0	0	1	0	0	0	0	0	13	0	0
26	GK	(United States) Javier Garcia	2	0	0	0	0	0	0	0	0	2	0	0
27	MF	(Colombia) Josué Manzano	0	0	0	0	0	0	0	0	0	0	0	0
28	MF	(United States) Justin Milovanov	5	1	0	1	0	0	0	0	0	6	1	0
30	GK	(United States) Tristan Stephani	2	0	0	0	0	0	0	0	0	2	0	0
33	MF	(Netherlands) Darren Sidoel	2	0	0	2	0	0	0	0	0	4	0	0
36	MF	(United States) William Black	0	0	0	0	0	0	0	0	0	0	0	0
91	MF	(Jamaica) Chevone Marsh	2	0	0	0	0	0	0	0	0	2	0	0
Total			78	1	1	12	1	1	0	0	0	90	2	2

== Awards and honors ==
=== USL League One Annual Awards ===
==== USL League One All League Honorees ====
Player	Team	Position	Ref
(United States) Ajmeer Spengler	Second	MF	

=== Weekly Awards ===
==== USL League One Team of the Week ====
Week	Player	Opponent	Position	Ref
3	(United States) Justin Milovanov	Spokane Velocity	Bench	
4	(United States) Ajmeer Spengler	Greenville Triumph SC and Fort Wayne FC	MF	
4	(Italy) Davide Galazzini	Fort Wayne FC	Bench	
5	(United States) Ajmeer Spengler	Charlotte Independence	FW	
7	(United States) Anderson Holt	Forward Madison FC	Bench	
7	(United States) Ajmeer Spengler	Forward Madison FC	Bench	
7	(Uruguay) Sebastián Guenzatti	Forward Madison FC	Bench	
24	(United States) Ozzie Ramos	AV Alta FC	Bench	
24	(Uruguay) Sebastián Guenzatti	AV Alta FC	Bench	
25	(United States) Ajmeer Spengler	Corpus Christi FC and Chattanooga Red Wolves SC	MF	
25	(Italy) Davide Corti	Corpus Christi FC and Chattanooga Red Wolves SC	Coach	
25	(United States) Ozzie Ramos	Corpus Christi FC and Chattanooga Red Wolves SC	Bench	
25	(The Gambia) Lamin Jawneh	Corpus Christi FC and Chattanooga Red Wolves SC	Bench	
27	(The Gambia) Lamin Jawneh	Sarasota Paradise and Fort Wayne FC	MF	
27	(United States) Ajmeer Spengler	Fort Wayne FC	MF	
27	(Uruguay) Sebastián Guenzatti	Fort Wayne FC	Bench	
28	(Uruguay) Sebastián Guenzatti	Athletic Club Boise	Bench	
29	(United States) Ajmeer Spengler	Westchester SC	MF	
30	(United States) Ajmeer Spengler	Richmond Kickers	MF	
30	(France) Christian Koffi	Richmond Kickers	FW	
34	(United States) Ajmeer Spengler	Spokane Velocity and Chattanooga Red Wolves SC	MF	
34	(United States) Ozzie Ramos	Spokane Velocity and Chattanooga Red Wolves SC	Bench	

==== USL League One Player of the Week ====
Week	Player	Opponent	Position	Ref
5	(United States) Ajmeer Spengler	Charlotte Independence	FW	
27	(The Gambia) Lamin Jawneh	Sarasota Paradise and Fort Wayne FC	MF	
30	(United States) Ajmeer Spengler	Richmond Kickers	MF	

==== USL League One Goal of the Week ====
Week	Player	Opponent	Position	Ref
2	(Netherlands) Darren Sidoel	Portland Hearts of Pine	MF	
21	(Uruguay) Sebastián Guenzatti	Athletic Club Boise	FW	
25	(United States) Ajmeer Spengler	Corpus Christi FC	MF	

==== USL League One Save of the Week ====
Week	Player	Opponent	Ref
13	(United States) Javier Garcia	Sarasota Paradise	
16	(United States) Derrek Chan	Forward Madison FC	
26	(United States) Javier Garcia	Union Omaha	

=== USL Cup Awards ===
==== Prinx Tires USL Cup Team of the Round ====
Week	Player	Opponent	Position	Ref
2	(United States) Ajmeer Spengler	Westchester SC	MF	
2	(Uruguay) Sebastián Guenzatti	Westchester SC	FW	

==== Prinx Tires USL Cup Save of the Round ====
Week	Player	Opponent	Ref
4	(United States) Tristan Stephani	Portland Hearts of Pine	

==== Prinx Tires USL Cup Team of the Tournament ====
Player	Position	Ref
(United States) Ajmeer Spengler	Bench	
