= Bohui =

Bohui is a surname. Notable people with the surname include:

- Joshua Bohui (born 1999), English footballer
- Patrick Bohui (born 2003), Ivorian footballer
