= Shamit Shome =

Bangladeshi footballer (born 1997)

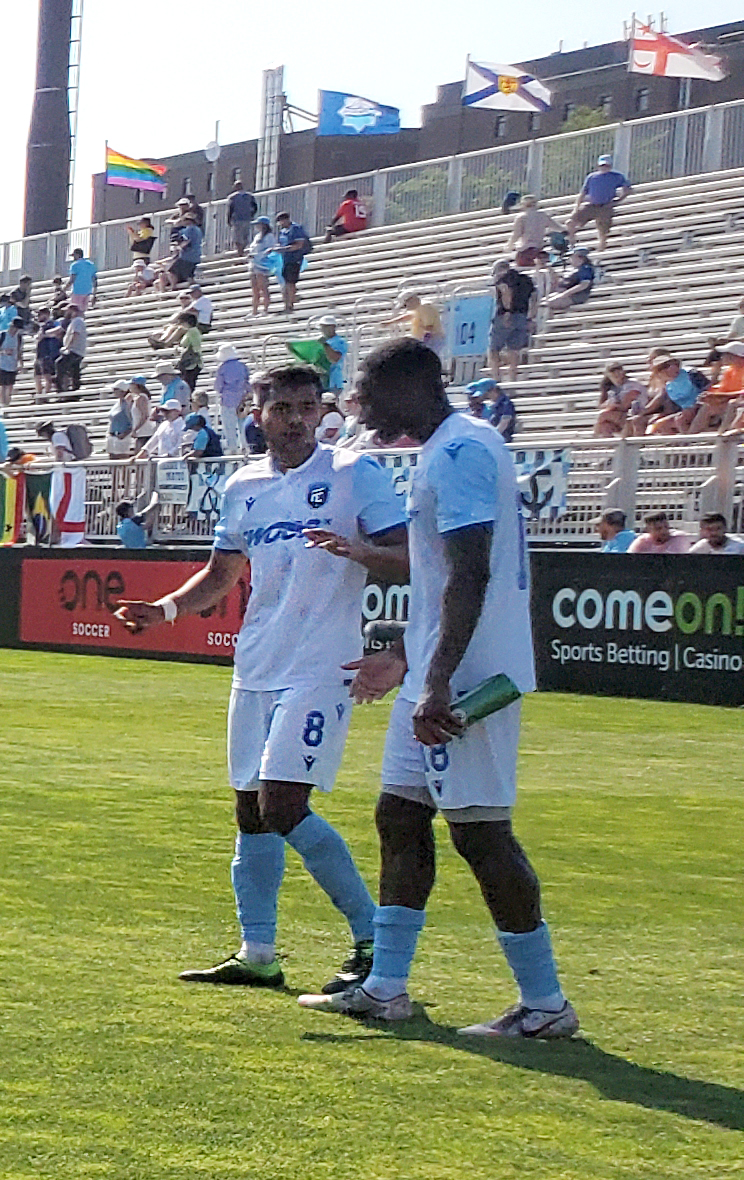
- Shome (in left) with FC Edmonton in 2022

Personal information
- Date of birth: 5 September 1997 (age 29)
- Place of birth: Edmonton, Alberta, Canada
- Height: 1.78 m (5 ft 10 in)
- Position: Midfielder

Team information
- Current team: New York Cosmos
- Number: 12

Youth career
- 2003–2014: Edmonton Southwest United SC
- 2015: FC Edmonton

College career
Years	Team	Apps	(Gls)
2015	Alberta Golden Bears	12	(6)

Senior career*
Years	Team	Apps	(Gls)
2016	FC Edmonton	26	(3)
2017–2020	Montreal Impact	45	(1)
2021	FC Edmonton	27	(0)
2022	Forge FC	0	(0)
2022	→ FC Edmonton (loan)	24	(0)
2023–2025	Cavalry FC	62	(0)
2026–	New York Cosmos	5	(0)

International career^{‡}
2014–2015	Canada U18		
2016	Canada U20	7	(0)
2018	Canada U21	4	(0)
2020	Canada	2	(0)
2025–	Bangladesh	14	(2)
- * Club domestic league appearances and goals as of 20 September 2026 ‡ National team caps and goals as of 18 November 2026

Shamit Shome (Bengali: শমিত সোম, Bengali pronunciation: [ʃɔmit ʃom]; born 5 September 1997) is a professional footballer who plays as a midfielder for USL League One club New York Cosmos. Born in Canada, and a former Canadian international, he represents the Bangladesh national team.

== Early life ==
Shome was born in Edmonton to Bangladeshi parents Manas and Nandita Shome, who hail from Sreemangal, Moulvibazar District, Sylhet. Both of whom migrated to Canada in the early 1990s. He played youth soccer with Edmonton Southwest United SC from 2003 until 2014. While playing for the Impact, Shome studied electrical engineering at Concordia University.

Shome joined FC Edmonton's academy program in 2015. In the fall of that year he enrolled at the University of Alberta and had a standout year with the Alberta Golden Bears scoring six goals in twelve appearances. This earned him the CWUAA Rookie of the Year Award.

== Club career ==
=== FC Edmonton ===
On February 12, 2016, Shome signed his first professional contract with FC Edmonton. He made his debut for the club on April 16 of that year, playing 80 minutes in a 1–0 loss to the Tampa Bay Rowdies. Throughout the 2016 season, Shome earned rave reviews from head coach Colin Miller, and was considered one of Canada's most exciting young prospects, getting numerous starts for one of the top clubs in the NASL.

=== Montreal Impact ===
On January 4, 2017, Major League Soccer announced that they had signed Shome to a Generation Adidas contract prior to the 2017 MLS SuperDraft, paying an undisclosed transfer fee to FC Edmonton in the process. Shome was drafted by the Montreal Impact in the second round of the draft. In October 2017, Shome made his MLS debut in the Impact's final game of the season, coming on as a substitute for Impact captain Patrice Bernier.

In March 2018, Shome was loaned to USL club Ottawa Fury FC, but he was recalled two weeks later due to injuries in the Impact midfield. Midway through the 2018 season, Shome began to get regular appearances off the bench, earning positive reviews. In April 2019, Shome got his first full 90 minute match against DC United, with an impressive impact on the pitch. He scored his first goal for Montreal against the New England Revolution on April 24. On May 29, Shome got his first assist to Omar Browne against Real Salt Lake. Shome would have his option for the 2020 season exercised by the Impact, keeping him with the club for 2020. At the end of the 2020 season, Shome would be released by the Impact, ending his time at the club after four seasons.

=== Return to FC Edmonton ===
On January 4, 2021, Shome returned to FC Edmonton, which by then had moved to the Canadian Premier League. On February 9, 2022, the club announced that Shome and all but two other players would not be returning for the 2022 season.

On April 5, 2022, Shome signed with Forge FC and was immediately loaned back to FC Edmonton for the 2022 season.

=== Cavalry ===
In January 2023, Cavalry FC announced they had signed Shome through the 2024 season, with a club option for the 2025 season. Shome won the 2023 CPL Shield and the 2024 North Star Cup and was also part of Cavalry's 2–1 victory over Pumas UNAM on February 6, 2025, in the 2025 CONCACAF Champions Cup. The win marked the first time a Canadian Premier League club defeated a Liga MX side in an official tournament match. He spent three seasons at the club, making 79 appearances, before leaving at the end of the 2025 season.

=== New York Cosmos ===
On 12 August 2026, USL League One club New York Cosmos announced the signing of Shome. On 29 August, Shome made his debut for Cosmos appearing as a starter in a 1–1 draw with Union Omaha. On September 5 2026, Shome assisted Lamin Jawneh on two goals in Cosmos 4-2 victory over Fort Wayne FC.

== International career ==
Shome was born in Canada to Bangladeshi parents, both of whom hail from Sylhet. As a result, he is eligible to play for Canada and Bangladesh.

=== Canada ===
Shome received his first call-up to a Canadian U18 national team camp in October 2014 while he was playing for Edmonton Southwest United. He received three further call-ups to Canadian U18 camps in 2015 and was the only university player called up to a camp in November 2015 in Mexico.

Shome received his first Canadian U20 national team call-up in February 2016 and started in a 2–1 upset against England in an unofficial youth friendly. In August 2016, Shome was called up to the U-20 team for a pair of friendlies against Costa Rica. Shome was nominated for Canada's U-20 player of the year in 2016. In February 2017, Shome missed the 2017 CONCACAF U-20 Championship due to injury. In May 2018, Shome was named to Canada's under-21 squad for the 2018 Toulon Tournament. Shome was named to the Canadian U-23 provisional roster for the 2020 CONCACAF Men's Olympic Qualifying Championship on February 26, 2020.

In January 2020, Shome was called up to the Canadian senior team ahead of friendlies against Barbados and Iceland. He made his debut on January 7 against Barbados as a substitute in their 4–1 victory.

=== Bangladesh ===
In April 2025, Shome officially expressed his interest to play for Bangladesh. On 5 May 2025, he acquired his Bangladeshi passport and received FIFA clearance to represent Bangladesh the following day. He was named to the team's preliminary squad, ahead of matches in June 2025. On 10 June 2025, he made his debut for Bangladesh during their 2–1 defeat to Singapore in the 2027 AFC Asian Cup qualification – third round. On 9 October 2025, Shamit scored his first international goal in Bangladesh's next qualification match, a 4–3 defeat to Hong Kong.

== Career statistics ==
=== Club ===
As of 30 September 2026

Club	League	Season	League		Playoffs		Domestic Cup		Continental		Total	
Club	League	Season	Apps	Goals	Apps	Goals	Apps	Goals	Apps	Goals	Apps	Goals
FC Edmonton	NASL	2016	26	0	1	0	1	0	—		28	0
Montreal Impact	MLS	2017	1	0	—		0	0	—		1	0
Montreal Impact	MLS	2018	5	0	—		1	0	—		6	0
Montreal Impact	MLS	2019	27	1	—		5	0	—		32	1
Montreal Impact	MLS	2020	12	0	0	0	—		1	0	13	0
Montreal Impact	Total		45	1	0	0	6	0	1	0	52	1
FC Edmonton	Canadian Premier League	2021	27	0	—		1	0	—		28	0
Forge FC	Canadian Premier League	2022	0	0	0	0	0	0	—		0	0
FC Edmonton (loan)	Canadian Premier League	2022	24	0	—		0	0	—		24	0
Cavalry FC	Canadian Premier League	2023	17	0	3	0	1	0	—		21	0
Cavalry FC	Canadian Premier League	2024	28	0	2	0	1	0	2	0	33	0
Cavalry FC	Canadian Premier League	2025	17	0	3	0	3	0	2	0	25	0
Cavalry FC	Total		62	0	8	0	5	0	4	0	79	0
New York Cosmos	USL League One	2026	5	0	0	0	0	0	0	0	5	0
Career Total			189	1	9	0	13	0	5	0	216	1

=== International ===
As of 11 November 2026

Appearances and goals by national team and year
National team	Year	Apps	Goals
Canada
Canada	2020	2	0
Bangladesh
Bangladesh	2025	5	1
Bangladesh	2026	8	1
Total		13	2
Career total		15	2

List of international goals scored by Shamit Shome
No.	Date	Venue	Opponent	Score	Result	Competition
1.	9 October 2025	National Stadium, Dhaka, Bangladesh	Hong Kong	3–3	3–4	2027 AFC Asian Cup qualification
2.	11 November 2026	National Stadium, Dhaka, Bangladesh	Sri Lanka	1–0	4–0	2026 SAFF Championship

== Honours ==
Cavalry FC

- Canadian Premier League championship: 2024
- CPL Shield: 2023

Montreal Impact

- Canadian Championship: 2019

Individual

- Canada West Rookie of the Year: 2015
