= Davide Galazzini =

Italian footballer (born 2000)

Personal information
- Full name: Davide Galazzini
- Date of birth: 16 March 2000 (age 26)
- Place of birth: Verona, Italy
- Height: 1.83 m (6 ft 0 in)
- Position: Defender

Team information
- Current team: New York Cosmos
- Number: 17

Youth career
- Chievo Verona
- Castelnuovo
- 2015–2019: Hellas Verona
- 2019–2020: Mantova 1911

Senior career*
Years	Team	Apps	(Gls)
2019–2020	Mantova 1911	27	(2)
2020	Sona	6	(0)
2021–2024	Trento	59	(1)
2024	Brindisi	11	(0)
2024–2025	Albalonga	34	(1)
2026–	New York Cosmos	18	(2)
- * Club domestic league appearances and goals as of 28 October 2026

Davide Galazzini (born 16 March 2000) is an Italian professional footballer who plays as a defender for New York Cosmos in the USL League One.

== Career ==
=== Youth ===
Born in Verona, Galazzini began his career in the youth teams of local side Chievo Verona, before moving to Castelnuovo. In 2015 he moved to Hellas Verona, captaining the Campionato Primavera 1 side at the U-19 level during the 2017/18 season, appearing in 17 matches and scoring 2 goals.

In 2019 he was sent on loan to Mantova 1911 initially playing with the Primavera squad.

=== Mantova 1911 ===
Galazzini was promoted to Mantova 1911's first team squad in 2019. He made 10 appearances for the club during the 2018–19 Serie D season, helping Mantova qualify for the promotion play-offs. On 4 August 2019, Galazzini appeared as starter for Mantova in a famous 2–0 victory over Siena in a Coppa Italia match. On 27 October 2019 he scored his first goal as a professional, in a 2–2 draw with AC Crema 1908. He ended the 2019–20 Serie D season making 17 league appearances, scoring two goals and recording four assists as the club was promoted to Serie C.

=== Sona ===
Galazzini joined Serie D side Sona in December 2020. He appeared in 6 league matches before transferring to Trento soon after.

=== Trento ===
Galazzini moved to Trento in January 2021. During his first season at the club, the 2020–21 Serie D season, under the tenure of head coach Carmine Parlato, Trento were crowned Girone C champions, thus returning into professionalism after 18 years in the amateur leagues. The Veronese winger, capable of playing both as a full-back in a back four and as a winger, was a regular at right back for the side, appearing in 20 matches, and scoring 1 goal and providing 6 assists during the championship season. He remained at the club through February 2024, playing for two and a half seasons in Serie C. While with Trento, Galazzini appeared in 63 matches, scoring 1 goal and providing 9 assists.

=== Brindisi ===
On 1 February 2024, Galazzini was transferred to Serie C side Brindisi. He made 11 appearances for the club, recording 1 assist.

=== Albalonga ===
On 23 July 2024, Galazzini joined Serie D side Albalonga. On 13 October 2024, Galazzini scored for Albalonga in a 2–2 draw with Latte Dolce. He ended the season appearing as a starter in all 36 matches for the club, scoring 1 goal and recording an assist.

=== New York Cosmos ===
On 17 December 2025, Galazzini joined USL League One side New York Cosmos ahead of their return to professional competition. Galazzini made his debut for the club on 14 March 2026, appearing as a starter in a 1-3 loss to Hearts of Pine. Galazzini scored his first goal for the club on 28 March 2026 in a 2-0 victory over Fort Wayne FC.

== Career statistics ==
As of match played 28 October 2026

Appearances and goals by club, season and competition
Club	Season	League			National Cup		Continental		Other		Total	
Club	Season	Division	Apps	Goals	Apps	Goals	Apps	Goals	Apps	Goals	Apps	Goals
Mantova 1911	2018–19	Serie D	10	0	0	0	—				10	0
Mantova 1911	2019–20	Serie D	17	2	2	0	—				19	2
Mantova 1911	Total		27	2	2	0	0	0	0	0	29	2
Sona	2020-21	Serie D	6	0			—				6	0
Trento	2020–21	Serie D	20	0	0	0	—				20	0
Trento	2021–22	Serie C	13	1	3	0	—				16	1
Trento	2022–23	Serie C	24	0	1	0	—				25	1
Trento	2023–24	Serie C	2	0			—				2	0
Total			59	1	4	0	0	0	0	0	63	1
Brindisi	2023–24	Serie C	11	0			—		—		11	0
Albalonga	2024-25	Serie D	34	1	2	0	—				36	1
New York Cosmos	2026	USL League One	18	2					1	0	19	2
Career total			155	6	8	0	0	0	1	0	164	56
