= Stalyn Acosta =

American-Honduran footballer (born 2006)

Personal information
- Full name: Stalyn Acosta
- Date of birth: 28 June 2006 (age 20)
- Place of birth: Brentwood, New York, United States
- Height: 1.75 m (5 ft 9 in)
- Position: Left back

Team information
- Current team: New York Cosmos
- Number: 3

Youth career
- Brentwood SC
- 2025: American Soccer Club NY

College career
| Years | Team | Apps | (Gls) |
| 2024 | Cortland Red Dragons | 18 | (1) |

Senior career*
| Years | Team | Apps | (Gls) |
| 2025-2026 | Ponce FC | 15 | (3) |
| 2026– | New York Cosmos | 9 | (0) |
- * Club domestic league appearances and goals as of 6 November 2026

Stalyn Acosta (born 28 June 2006) is a professional footballer who plays as a defender for New York Cosmos in the USL League One.

== Career ==
=== Youth, college and amateur ===
Born in Brentwood, New York, Acosta played youth soccer in Long Island with Brentwood SC. He was also a standout player for Brentwood High School as he helped the school win its 10th Long Island Championship title, and a fifth New York State title during his senior season.

In 2024, Acosta attended State University of New York at Cortland to play college soccer. He played for one season with the Red Dragons, making 18 appearances and scoring 1 goal and recording 4 assists.

In 2025 he joined local club American Soccer Club-NY, playing for the club in its inaugural season in the National Premier Soccer League.

=== Professional ===
==== Ponce FC ====
In February 2026, Acosta signed his first professional contract joining Liga Puerto Rico Pro side Ponce FC. He made his debut for the club on 9 February 2026, scoring on his debut in a 5-0 victory over Taurinos de Cayey. In the 2025-26 Clausura playoffs, the club defeated Metropolitan FA in the semi-finals to advance to the finals for the first time in club history. Ponce FC went on to defeat Academia Quintana 3–1 in the final to win the club's first-ever national championship.

==== New York Cosmos ====
On 7 August 2026 Acosta joined USL League One side New York Cosmos. Acosta made his Cosmos debut on 15 August 2026, appearing as a starter in a 1-0 victory over AV Alta FC.

== Career statistics ==
As of match played 06 November 2026

Appearances and goals by club, season and competition
| Club | Season | League | | | National Cup | | League Cup | | Playoffs | | Total | |
| Club | Season | Division | Apps | Goals | Apps | Goals | Apps | Goals | Apps | Goals | Apps | Goals |
|---|---|---|---|---|---|---|---|---|---|---|---|---|
| Ponce FC | 2025-2026 | Liga Puerto Rico Pro | 15 | 3 | 0 | 0 | — | | 2 | 0 | 17 | 3 |
| New York Cosmos | 2026 | USL League One | 9 | 0 | 0 | 0 | 0 | 0 | 0 | 0 | 9 | 0 |
| Career total | | | 24 | 3 | 0 | 0 | 0 | 0 | 2 | 0 | 26 | 3 |
