= Ajmeer Spengler =

American soccer player (born 2000)

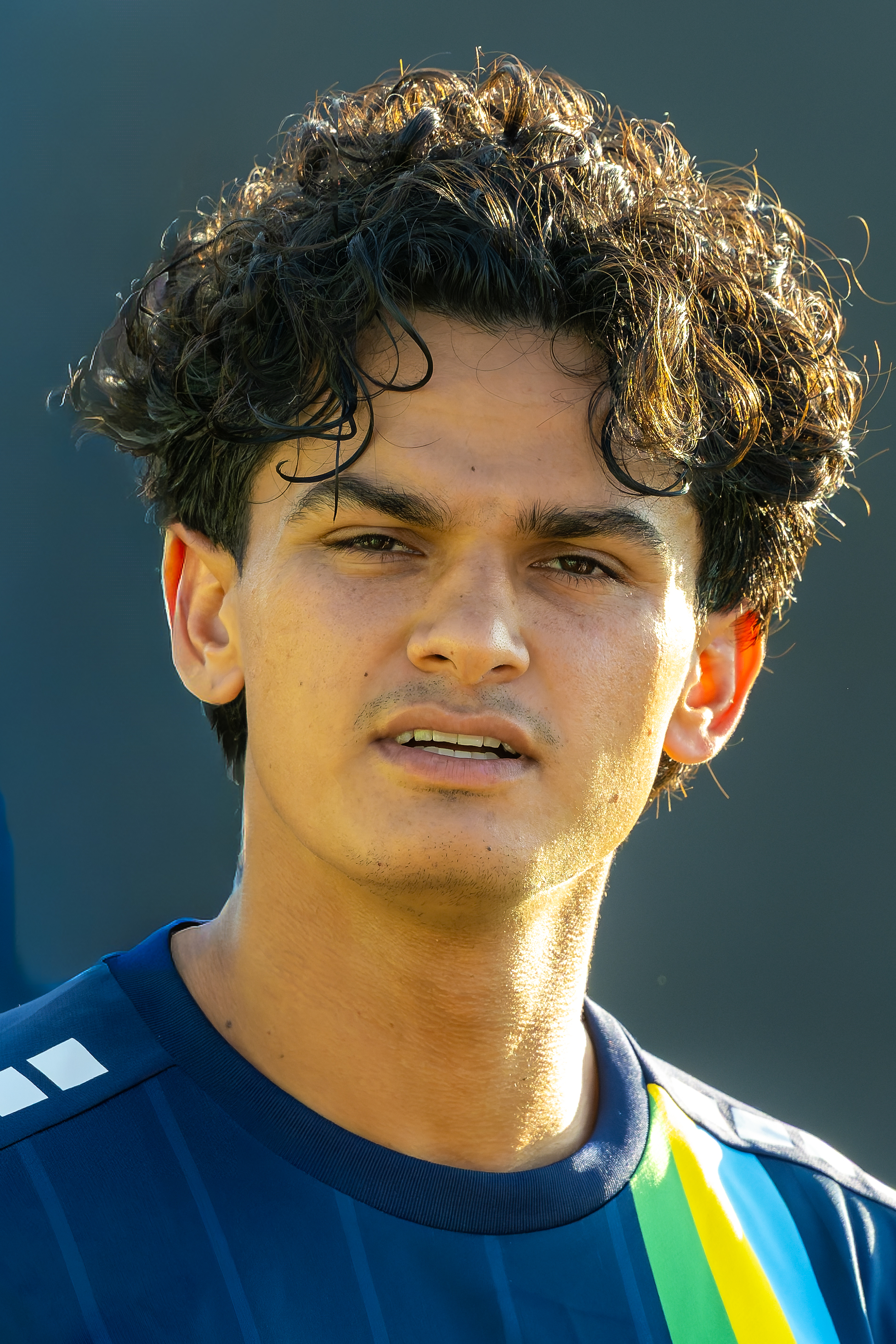
- Spengler with the NY Cosmos in 2026

Personal information
- Full name: Philip Ajmeer Spengler
- Date of birth: October 11, 2000 (age 26)
- Place of birth: Tampa, Florida, United States
- Height: 1.72 m (5 ft 8 in)
- Position: Midfielder

Team information
- Current team: New York Cosmos
- Number: 8

Youth career
- –2019: Chargers SC

College career
Years	Team	Apps	(Gls)
2019–2021	Stetson Hatters	38	(8)
2022–2023	South Florida Bulls	36	(9)

Senior career*
Years	Team	Apps	(Gls)
2021–2022	Tampa Bay United	11	(4)
2024	Tormenta FC	21	(2)
2025	Texoma FC	29	(9)
2026–	New York Cosmos	32	(11)
- * Club domestic league appearances and goals as of October 27, 2026

Philip 'Ajmeer' Spengler (born October 11, 2000) is an American professional soccer player who plays as a midfielder for New York Cosmos in the USL League One.

== Career ==
=== Youth, college and amateur ===
Born in Tampa, Florida, Spengler played youth soccer for local club Clearwater Chargers SC. In 2019, Spengler attended Stetson University to play college soccer. He played three seasons with the Hatters, making 38 appearances and scoring 8 goals and recording 3 assists. In 2022, Spengler transferred to University of South Florida, where he played a further two seasons at the college level. He scored nine goals and tallied eight assists in 38 appearances for the Bulls. He was named AAC First Team All-Conference in 2023.

During his time at college, Spengler also played in the USL League Two with Tampa Bay United. He made 11 appearances for the club, scoring 4 goals.

=== Tormenta FC ===
On March 8, 2024, Spengler signed his first professional contract with USL League One side Tormenta FC ahead of their 2024 season. Spengler quickly established himself as an important player for Tormenta, on April 17, 2024 he had the assist on the equalizing goal from Conor Doyle, in an eventual 2–4 victory over USL Championship side Miami FC, helping his side to advance to the fourth round of the Lamar Hunt U.S. Open Cup. Spengler scored his first goal as a professional on May 18, 2024 in a 4–0 victory over Chattanooga Red Wolves. On September 21, 2024, Spengler scored a stoppage time equalizer to help Tormenta to a 3–3 draw with Charlotte Independence. Spengler ended his first season as a professional appearing in 32 matches and scoring 2 goals and recording 7 assists.

=== Texoma FC ===
On February 15, 2025, Spengler joined Texoma FC ahead of their inaugural season in the USL League One. Spengler scored his first goal with Texoma on April 13, 2025, in a 4–1 loss to Spokane Velocity. On May 3, 2025, Spengler recorded his first brace as a professional in a 4–3 loss to Charlotte Independence. On May 18, 2025, Spengler scored his clubs second goal in a 2–1 victory over reigning champions Union Omaha, helping Texoma to their first win in club history. Spengler ended the season appearing in 33 matches and leading the club with nine goals, while also recording five assists, and was selected to the USL League One Second Team.

=== New York Cosmos ===
On December 12, 2025, Spengler joined USL League One side New York Cosmos ahead of their return to professional competition. Spengler made his debut for the club on March 14, 2026, appearing as a started in a 1-3 loss to Hearts of Pine, he assisted Darren Sidoel on the Cosmos lone goal of the match. On March 25, 2026, Spengler scored his first goal for Cosmos in a 3-2 loss to Greenville Triumph. On March 28, 2026 Spengler assisted on his clubs two goals in a 2-0 victory over Fort Wayne FC, the Cosmos first victory of the season. On April 3, 2026 Spengler recorded a hat trick, scoring all three from the penalty spot, in a 3-2 victory over Charlotte Independence. For his performance, he was named player of the week, becoming the first player in USL League One history to record a hat trick made up of three penalty kicks. On August 20, 2026, he scored a world-class goal in 2-0 victory over Corpus Christi FC, he took the ball from his side of the field and maneuvered past defenders to unleash a shot into goal from outside the box. On September 27 2026, Spengler opened the scoring for Cosmos in a 3-2 victory over Richmond Kickers, scoring the game winner on a penalty kick in second half stoppage-time.

== Career statistics ==
As of match played 28 September 2026

Appearances and goals by club, season and competition
Club	Season	League			National cup		League cup		Other		Total	
Club	Season	Division	Apps	Goals	Apps	Goals	Apps	Goals	Apps	Goals	Apps	Goals
Tampa Bay United	2021	USL League Two	4	1	0	0	—		0	0	4	1
Tampa Bay United	2022	USL League Two	7	3	0	0	—		0	0	7	3
Tampa Bay United	Total		11	4	0	0	0	0	0	0	11	4
Tormenta FC	2024	USL League One	21	2	3	0	7	0	0	0	31	2
Texoma FC	2025	USL League One	29	9	1	0	3	0	0	0	33	9
New York Cosmos	2026	USL League One	32	11	0	0	4	0	0	0	36	11
Career total			93	26	4	0	14	0	0	0	111	26
