= Leo Guarino =

American soccer player (born 2003)

Personal information
- Full name: Eligio Guarino
- Date of birth: May 23, 2003 (age 23)
- Place of birth: Long Island, New York, United States
- Height: 1.75 m (5 ft 9 in)
- Position: Midfielder

Team information
- Current team: New York Cosmos
- Number: 7

Youth career
- 2015–2017: New York Red Bulls
- 2017–2020: New York City FC
- 2020–2021: New York Cosmos
- 2021: Queensboro FC

College career
Years	Team	Apps	(Gls)
2021–2023	Wake Forest Demon Deacons	49	(10)
2024	Boston College Eagles	17	(1)

Senior career*
Years	Team	Apps	(Gls)
2020	New York Cosmos	0	(0)
2023-2024	Long Island Rough Riders	2	(0)
2025	New York City FC II	22	(4)
2026–	New York Cosmos	3	(0)
- * Club domestic league appearances and goals as of July 1, 2026

Eligio Guarino (born May 23, 2003) is an American professional soccer player who plays as an attacking midfielder for New York Cosmos in the USL League One.

== Career ==
=== Youth, college and amateur ===
Guarino, who is of Italian descent, grew up in East Rockaway, New York. He was initially a part of the New York Red Bulls academy system, before going across the river to join New York City FC's academy in 2017. After three years there, including captaining the U17 squad and being the top scorer at the 2019–20 Generation Adidas Cup, Guarino joined the New York Cosmos academy in 2020, and was an unused substitute in 1 NISA game for them.

Guarino then briefly spent time with Queensboro FC's academy in USL Academy in 2021, before enrolling to play at Wake Forest in 2021. Across three years at the school, Guarino played in 49 matches, scoring 10 goals and adding 2 assists. He then transferred to Boston College for his senior year in 2024, scoring 1 goal and adding 3 assists in 17 matches, starting in 12.

During his time in college, Guarino spent the summers of 2023 and 2024 with Long Island Rough Riders in USL League Two, but only made 2 appearance during the two seasons.

=== New York City FC II ===
Guarino signed his first professional contract with New York City FC II ahead of the 2025 MLS Next Pro season. On April 24, 2025, he scored his first goal for the club in a 4–1 loss to Philadelphia Union II. On July 16, 2025, Guarino scored the only goal in a 1–0 victory over Toronto FC II. On July 20, 2025, Guarino scored the second goal of the match for NYCFCII in a 4–2 derby loss to New York Red Bulls II. On August 22, 2025, he opened the scoring for New York in a 3–1 victory over Columbus Crew 2. Guarino went on to play in 22 games, with 4 goals and 1 assist from 9 starts. He split time between playing as a striker and on the left wing.

=== New York Cosmos ===
On February 14, 2026, Guarino joined USL League One side New York Cosmos ahead of their return to professional competition. He became the first former academy product to sign with the club.

== Career statistics ==
As of match played 1 July 2026

Appearances and goals by club, season and competition
Club	Season	League			National cup		League cup		Other		Total	
Club	Season	Division	Apps	Goals	Apps	Goals	Apps	Goals	Apps	Goals	Apps	Goals
New York Cosmos	2020	NISA	0	0	0	0	0	0	0	0	0	0
Long Island Rough Riders	2023	USL League Two	1	0	0	0	—		0	0	1	0
Long Island Rough Riders	2024	USL League Two	1	0	0	0	—		0	0	1	0
Long Island Rough Riders	Total		2	0	0	0	0	0	0	0	2	0
New York City FC II	2025	MLS Next Pro	22	4	0	0	0	0	0	0	22	4
New York Cosmos	2026	USL League One	3	0	0	0	2	0	0	0	5	0
Career total			27	4	0	0	2	0	0	0	29	4
