= Nestor Cabrera =

Guatemalan footballer (born 2000)

Personal information
- Full name: Nestor Cabrera
- Date of birth: 12 November 2003 (age 22)
- Place of birth: Raritan, New Jersey, United States
- Height: 1.80 m (5 ft 11 in)
- Positions: Midfielder; defender

Team information
- Current team: New York Cosmos
- Number: 5

Youth career
- 2015–2019: PDA
- 2020–2021: New York Red Bulls
- 2021–2022: Queensboro FC

College career
Years	Team	Apps	(Gls)
2022–2025	Rutgers Scarlet Knights	64	(2)

Senior career*
Years	Team	Apps	(Gls)
2025	FC Motown	4	(0)
2026–	New York Cosmos	27	(1)

International career
- Guatemala U17
2022–2023	Guatemala U20	12	(0)
2024–	Guatemala	3	(0)
- * Club domestic league appearances and goals as of 28 October 2026

Nestor Cabrera (born 12 November 2003) is a professional footballer who plays as a defender for New York Cosmos in the USL League One. Born in the United States, he represents the Guatemala national team.

== Career ==
=== Youth, college and amateur ===
Born in Raritan, New Jersey, Cabrera played youth soccer in New Jersey with PDA, starting at U12. After four years with PDA, Cabrera moved to New York Red Bulls Academy, and in 2021 to top USL Academy side Queensboro FC. He graduated from Bridgewater-Raritan High School.

In 2022, Cabrera attended Rutgers University to play college soccer. He played for four season with the Scarlet Knights, making 64 appearances and scoring 2 goals and recording 4 assists.

During his time at college, Cabrera also played in the USL League Two with FC Motown. He made 4 appearances for the club during the 2025 season.

=== Professional ===
==== New York Cosmos ====
On 19 December 2025, Cabrera joined USL League One side New York Cosmos, signing his first professional contract ahead of their return to professional competition. On 22 August 2026, Cabrera scored his first goal as a professional for Cosmos in a 3-3 draw against Chattanooga Red Wolves.

== International ==
Cabrera has represented Guatemala from the U17 to U20 levels. He helped Guatemala U20 qualify to the 2023 FIFA U-20 World Cup.

Cabrera made his debut with the full national team on 27 July 2024 in a 1–0 loss to El Salvador.

== Career statistics ==
As of match played 28 September 2026

Appearances and goals by club, season and competition
Club	Season	League			National cup		League cup		Other		Total	
Club	Season	Division	Apps	Goals	Apps	Goals	Apps	Goals	Apps	Goals	Apps	Goals
FC Motown	2025	USL League Two	4	0	0	0	—		0	0	4	0
New York Cosmos	2026	USL League One	27	1	0	0	2	0	0	0	29	1
Career total			31	1	0	0	2	0	0	0	33	1
