= Christian Koffi (footballer, born 2000) =

French footballer (born 2000)

Personal information
- Full name: Christian Loic Koffi
- Date of birth: 28 August 2000 (age 26)
- Place of birth: France
- Height: 1.73 m (5 ft 8 in)
- Positions: Midfielder; winger

Team information
- Current team: New York Cosmos
- Number: 18

Youth career
- –2018: Monaco
- 2018–2020: Fiorentina

Senior career*
Years	Team	Apps	(Gls)
2020–2022	Fiorentina	0	(0)
2020–2021	→ Cesena (loan)	11	(1)
2021	→ Como (loan)	6	(0)
2021–2022	→ Sète (loan)	18	(1)
2022–2023	Intercity	8	(0)
2024	Chicago Fire II	25	(2)
2025	Huntsville City FC	18	(10)
2026–	New York Cosmos	10	(0)
- * Club domestic league appearances and goals as of 07 September 2026

Christian Loic Koffi (born 28 August 2000) is a French footballer who plays for USL League One club New York Cosmos.

== Career ==
Born in Paris, France, Koffi joined the Monaco academy. In 2018, Koffi signed for Serie A side Fiorentina after rejecting a professional contract with Monaco, as well as an offer from Liverpool, one of the most successful teams in England.

=== Fiorentina ===
Upon joining Fiorentina, Koffi was assigned to the clubs Campionato Primavera 1 side. He featured regularly for Fiorentina's Primavera side, where he scored eight goals and provided nine assists in 58 matches, helping the club win the Coppa Italia Primavera in 2019 and 2020.

==== loan to Cesena ====
Koffi was loaned to Serie C side Cesena during November 2020. He made his professional debut on 2 November 2020, appearing as a second half substitute in a 2–0 loss to Padova. On 7 November 2020, Koffi started his first match for Cesena, playing 86 minutes in a 1–1 draw with Fermana FC. On 15 November 2020, Koffi scored his first goal for the club in a 4–0 victory over Ravenna.

==== loan to Como ====
On 1 February 2021, Koffi joined Serie C club Como on loan until the end of the 2020–21 season. He made his debut for Como on 3 February 2021, appearing as a substitute in a 3–0 victory over Juventus Next Gen. He made his first start for the club on 27 February 2021, a 2–1 loss to Pro Patria. He ended his time at the club appearing in seven matches as Como was promoted to Serie B.

==== loan to Sète ====
Koffi returned to France in 2021, where he made 18 appearances and scored 1 goal for Sète in Championnat National while on loan from Fiorentina. Koffi scored for Sète on 24 September 2021 in a 5–2 loss to Football Bourg-en-Bresse Péronnas 01.

=== Intercity ===
On 18 August 2022, Koffi moved to Intercity in Spain, playing in Primera Federación. He made his debut for Intercity on 30 October 2022, appearing as a substitute in a 2–2 draw with UD Logroñés. On 4 January 2023, he made his debut in Copa del Rey, playing 56 minutes in a substitute appearance against FC Barcelona, a match the Catalan giants would win 4–3 in extra time.

=== Chicago Fire ===
On 14 March 2024, Koffi moved to Chicago Fire FC in the United States, signing an MLS NEXT Pro contract to play with Chicago Fire FC II. He made his debut with Chicago Fire FC II on 28 March 2024 in a 1–1 draw with Philadelphia Union II. On 16 June 2024, he scored his first goal with Chicago in a 4–0 victory over Huntsville City FC. During the 2024 season, he made 27 appearances (regular season and playoffs), scored two goals, and provided seven assists for Chicago Fire FC II.

Koffi was called up to the first team for the Leagues Cup campaign. On 29 July 2024, Koffi made his debut with Chicago Fire FC, playing 28 minutes in a 2–1 defeat to Sporting Kansas City at Children's Mercy Park. On 1 August 2024, he made another appearance in a 3–1 loss to Liga MX side Toluca.

=== Huntsville City ===
On 14 January 2025, Koffi signed with Huntsville City FC in MLS Next Pro. He made his debut for Huntsville City on 9 March 2025 against his former team Chicago Fire FC II, scoring two goals in a 4–1 victory at SeatGeek Stadium. During the 2025 season, he made 20 appearances (regular season and playoffs), scored eleven goals, and provided six assists for the club.

=== New York Cosmos ===
On 7 January 2026, Koffi signed with USL League One side New York Cosmos ahead of their return to professional competition. He made his debut for the club on 14 March 2026, appearing as a starter in a 3-1 loss to Hearts of Pine. On 15 May 2026, Koffi scored his first goal for Cosmos, a second-half stoppage time winner, leading his club to a 3-2 comeback victory over Westchester SC in a USL Cup match.

== Career statistics ==
As of match played 6 September 2026

Appearances and goals by club, season and competition
Club	Season	League			National cup		Continental		Other		Total	
Club	Season	Division	Apps	Goals	Apps	Goals	Apps	Goals	Apps	Goals	Apps	Goals
Cesena (loan)	2020–21	Serie C	11	1	0	0	—				11	1
Como (loan)	2020–21	Serie C	6	0	1	0	—				7	0
Sète (loan)	2021–22	Championnat National	18	1			—				18	1
Intercity	2022–23	Primera Federación	8	0	1	0	—		—		9	0
Chicago Fire FC II	2024	MLS Next Pro	25	2	2	0	—		2	0	29	2
Chicago Fire FC	2024	MLS	0	0			2 (Note: Appearances in Leagues Cup)	0			2	0
Huntsville City FC	2025	MLS Next Pro	18	10			—		2	1	20	11
New York Cosmos	2026	USL League One	10	0			—		3	1	13	1
Career total			96	14	4	0	2	0	7	2	109	16
