= Brentwood High School =

Brentwood High School may refer to:

== Australia ==
- Brentwood Secondary College (Glen Waverley, Victoria)

== United Kingdom ==
- Brentwood County High School (Brentwood, Essex)
- Brentwood School (Brentwood, Essex)

== United States ==
- Brentwood High School (Missouri)
- Brentwood High School (New York)
- Brentwood High School (Pennsylvania)
- Brentwood High School (Tennessee)
- Brentwood School (Los Angeles)

== See also ==
- Brentwood Academy, Brentwood, Tennessee
