= Josué Manzano =

Ecuadorian footballer (born 2005)

Josué "Toty" Manzano
Personal information
- Full name: Néstor Josué Manzano Barrades
- Date of birth: August 27, 2005 (age 21)
- Place of birth: Guayaquil, Ecuador
- Height: 1.68 m (5 ft 6 in)
- Position: Left winger

Team information
- Current team: New York Cosmos
- Number: 27

Youth career
- 2014–2015: C.S. Norte América
- 2015–2024: Orlando City SC

Senior career*
Years	Team	Apps	(Gls)
2024	Club Atlético JBG	0	(0)
2026–	New York Cosmos	0	(0)
2026–	Cuenca Juniors (loan)	5	(0)

International career^{‡}
2022	Ecuador U17	2	(0)
- * Club domestic league appearances and goals as of October 30, 2026 ‡ National team caps and goals as of October 31, 2025

Néstor Josué "Toty" Manzano Barrades (born August 27, 2005) is an Ecuadorian professional footballer who plays as a left winger for New York Cosmos in the USL League One.

== Career ==
=== Youth and amateur ===
Born in Guayaquil, Ecuador, Manzano began his career in the academy of C.S. Norte América, In 2015, he moved with his family to Orlando, Florida, soon after joining the academy of Orlando City SC. Quickly establishing himself as a top prospect, Manzano was part of the U-17 team that won the MLS Next Cup crown. He also featured for Orlando City's U-23 team in the United Premier Soccer League.

=== Club Atlético JBG ===
In 2024 Manzano returned to Ecuador, spending part of the 2024 season in Guayaquil with Club Atlético JBG, a second-tier club affiliated with Atlético Madrid.

=== New York Cosmos ===
On December 3, 2025, Manzano joined USL League One side New York Cosmos ahead of their return to professional competition.

== International ==
Manzano has represented Ecuador at the youth level, appearing twice for the U-17 national teams.
