= Frankie Ljucovic =

American soccer player (born 2000)

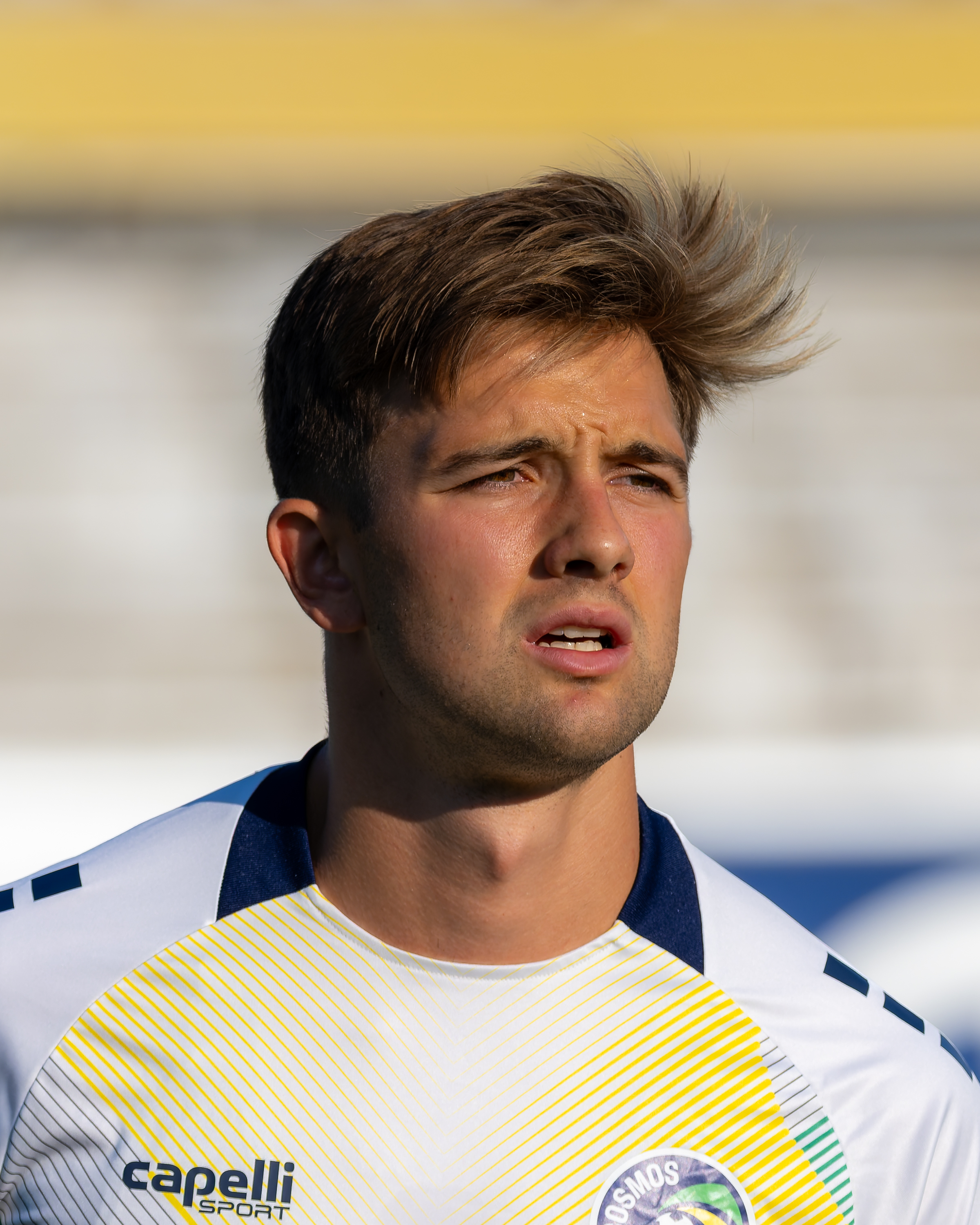
- Ljucovic in 2026

Personal information
- Full name: Frankie Ljucovic
- Date of birth: 6 October 2000 (age 26)
- Place of birth: Millbrook, New York, United States
- Height: 1.74 m (5 ft 9 in)
- Position: Midfielder

Team information
- Current team: New York Cosmos
- Number: 7

Youth career
- Quickstrike FC

College career
| Years | Team | Apps | (Gls) |
| 2018–2022 | Gonzaga Bulldogs | 85 | (7) |

Senior career*
| Years | Team | Apps | (Gls) |
| 2019 | Kingston Stockade FC | | |
| 2022 | Hudson Valley Hammers | 14 | (7) |
| 2024–2025 | North West Sydney Spirit FC | 34 | (1) |
| 2026– | New York Cosmos | 18 | (0) |
- * Club domestic league appearances and goals as of 3 November 2026

Frankie Ljucovic (born 6 October 2000) is an American professional soccer player who plays as a midfielder for New York Cosmos in the USL League One.

== Career ==
=== Youth, college and amateur ===
Born in Millbrook, New York, Ljucovic played youth soccer in New York with Quickstrike FC and Soccer Plus development academy soccer league. He also played for premier residential soccer program Shattuck-St. Mary's Soccer Center of Excellence located in Faribault, Minnesota.

In 2018, Ljucovic accepted an offer to Gonzaga University to play college soccer. He played for five season with the Bulldogs, making 85 appearances and scoring 7 goals and recording 5 assists.

Ljucovic began playing with local National Premier Soccer League side Kingston Stockade FC in 2019 and was a key player for the side. On 23 June 2019 he made his starting debut for the side, being named Man of the Match in a 3–0 victory over Boston City FC

During his time at college, Frankie also played in the USL League Two with Hudson Valley Hammers. He made 14 appearances and scored 7 goals for the club during the 2022 season.

=== NWS Spirit ===
Ljucovic joined North West Sydney Spirit FC in Australia's National Premier Leagues NSW in 2023. He became a first team regular in 2025 for NWS Spirit. On 21 June 2025, Ljucovic scored his first goal for the club, the lone goal in a 1-0 victory over Western Sydney Wanderers.

Ljucovic appeared in 29 league matches as a starter during the 2025 season, with the Spirit securing the Premiership title in the penultimate game, which qualified them for the inaugural Australian Championship. This included a ruthless 6–3 win over Rockdale Ilinden, immediately follow a 5-0 demolition of 2024 champions Marconi Stallions at Marconi Stadium. However, a weakened Spirit side without Ljucovic would lose to Rockdale Ilinden 1–2 in the preliminary final after extra time.

==== New York Cosmos ====
On 10 July 2026, Ljucovic joined USL League One side New York Cosmos, signing his first professional contract in the United States. Ljucovic would make his debut for the club on 18 July 2026, coming on in the second half in a 0-0 draw with Corpus Christi FC.

== Honours ==
- National Premier Leagues NSW
  - Premiership (1): 2025

== Career statistics ==
As of match played 3 November 2026

Appearances and goals by club, season and competition
| Club | Season | League | | | National Cup | | League Cup | | Other | | Total | |
| Club | Season | Division | Apps | Goals | Apps | Goals | Apps | Goals | Apps | Goals | Apps | Goals |
|---|---|---|---|---|---|---|---|---|---|---|---|---|
| North West Sydney Spirit FC | 2024 | National Premier Leagues NSW | 5 | 0 | 1 | 0 | — | | 0 | 0 | 6 | 0 |
| North West Sydney Spirit FC | 2025 | National Premier Leagues NSW | 29 | 1 | 0 | 0 | 1 | 0 | 0 | 0 | 30 | 1 |
| North West Sydney Spirit FC | Total | | 34 | 1 | 1 | 0 | 1 | 0 | 0 | 0 | 36 | 1 |
| New York Cosmos | 2026 | USL League One | 18 | 0 | 0 | 0 | 0 | 0 | 0 | 0 | 18 | 0 |
| Career total | | | 52 | 1 | 1 | 0 | 1 | 0 | 0 | 0 | 54 | 1 |
