= Derrek Chan =

American soccer player (born 1998)

Personal information
- Full name: Derrek Tsitin Chan
- Date of birth: August 8, 1998 (age 28)
- Place of birth: Cowan Heights, California, United States
- Height: 1.90 m (6 ft 3 in)
- Position: Goalkeeper

Team information
- Current team: New York Cosmos
- Number: 1

Youth career
- West Coast FC
- Cal South ODP
- LA Galaxy
- Strikers FC
- FC Golden State

College career
Years	Team	Apps	(Gls)
2017–2021	UC Davis Aggies	16	(0)

Senior career*
Years	Team	Apps	(Gls)
2018	Orange County SC U23	1	(0)
2022	New York Red Bulls II	5	(0)
2022	→ Rochester New York FC (loan)	0	(0)
2022	→ Charlotte Independence (loan)	1	(0)
2023	Real Monarchs	4	(0)
2024–2025	Mülheimer FC 97	2	(0)
2026–	New York Cosmos	5	(0)
- * Club domestic league appearances and goals as of November 3, 2026

Derrek Tsitin Chan (born August 8, 1998) is an American soccer player who currently plays as a goalkeeper for New York Cosmos in the USL League One.

== Career ==
=== Youth ===
Chan played high school soccer at Orange Lutheran High School, where he was a three-time team defensive MVP and earned All-Trinity League honors in his final prep season. Chan also played club soccer for various teams in California, including West Coast FC, who he helped to titles at the National Cup, the Surf Cup Super Cup, and the Vegas Cup, as well as a SCDCL Flight One title. Chan also competed for the CalSouth ODP, LA Galaxy Academy, Strikers FC Academy, and FC Golden State Academy teams.

=== College and amateur ===
In 2017, Chan attended the University of California, Davis to play college soccer. Chan made 16 appearances for the Aggies, 15 of those in his final season in 2021, where he recorded 45 saves, and tallied four shutouts.

While at college, Chan also appeared in the USL PDL for Orange County SC U23 in 2018, making a single appearance.

=== New York Red Bulls II ===
On March 3, 2022, Chan signed with USL Championship club New York Red Bulls II. He made his professional debut on April 2, 2022, coming on as a 2nd–minute substitute in a 3–2 loss to FC Tulsa following a sending off to starting goalkeeper Giannis Nikopolidis. On May 11, 2022, New York announced that Chan had been loaned to Rochester New York FC for their U.S. Open Cup match against New York City FC. The Red Bulls recalled Chan immediately after the game. Chan made his first professional start for New York Red Bulls II on May 21, 2022, during a 2–0 loss to Indy Eleven.

On June 10, 2022, Chan joined USL League One side Charlotte Independence on a short-term loan deal. He started for the Independence the following day in a 4–0 loss to Richmond Kickers.

=== Real Monarchs ===
On March 31, 2023, Chan signed with MLS Next Pro club Real Monarchs. In one season with the club, Chan appeared in 4 league matches.

=== Mülheimer FC 97 ===
During August 2024, Chan signed his first contract in Europe with Oberliga side Mülheimer FC. On October 3, 2024, Chan made his debut as a starter for Mülheimer FC in a 1-1 draw with TSV Meerbusch.

=== New York Cosmos ===
On December 12, 2025, Chan joined USL League One side New York Cosmos ahead of their return to professional competition. On March 28, 2026 Chan made his debut for the club, recording a clean sheet in a 2-0 victory over Fort Wayne FC.

== International career ==
Chan was called up to the Chinese Taipei national team for a set of 2026 FIFA World Cup qualification matches in June 2024.

== Career statistics ==
As of match played November 3, 2026

Appearances and goals by club, season and competition
Club	Season	League			National cup		League cup		Other		Total	
Club	Season	Division	Apps	Goals	Apps	Goals	Apps	Goals	Apps	Goals	Apps	Goals
Orange County SC U23	2018	PDL	1	0	0	0	0	0	0	0	1	0
New York Red Bulls II	2022	USL Championship	5	0	0	0	0	0	0	0	5	0
Charlotte Independence (loan)	2022	USL League One	1	0	0	0	0	0	0	0	1	0
Real Monarchs	2023	MLS Next Pro	4	0	0	0	0	0	0	0	4	0
Mülheimer FC 97	2024-25	Oberliga	2	0	0	0	0	0	0	0	2	0
New York Cosmos	2026	USL League One	5	0	0	0	1	0	0	0	6	0
Career total			18	0	0	0	1	0	0	0	19	0
