= Nick Mendonca =

American soccer player (born 2001)

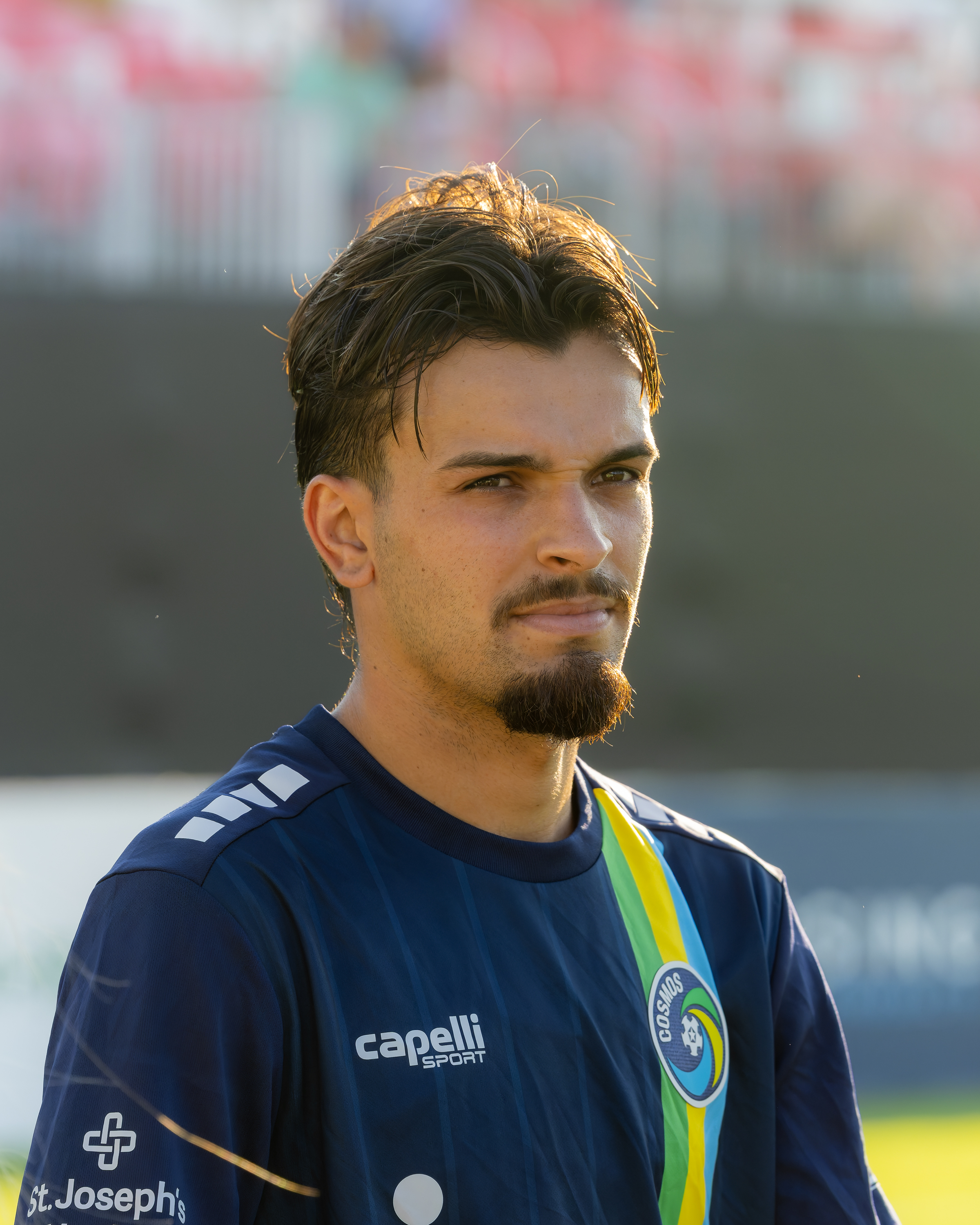
- Mendonca with NY Cosmos in 2026

Personal information
- Full name: Nick Mendonca
- Date of birth: February 11, 2001 (age 25)
- Place of birth: Miami, Florida, United States
- Height: 1.79 m (5 ft 10 in)
- Position: Midfielder

Team information
- Current team: New York Cosmos
- Number: 20

Youth career
- 2016–2018: Flamengo
- 2018–2020: Vasco da Gama
- 2019: → Trindade (loan)

Senior career*
Years	Team	Apps	(Gls)
2021	FC Miami City	1	(0)
2022	Minnesota United FC 2	23	(0)
2024	North Texas SC	22	(0)
2025	Chattanooga FC	25	(0)
2026–	New York Cosmos	24	(1)
- * Club domestic league appearances and goals as of November 3, 2026

Nick Mendonca (born February 11, 2001) is an American professional soccer player who plays as a midfielder for New York Cosmos in the USL League One. He played youth soccer in Brazil with Flamengo and Vasco da Gama before beginning his professional career in MLS Next Pro.

== Career ==
=== Youth and amateur ===
Born in Miami, Florida, Mendonca who is also a citizen of Brazil, played youth soccer in Florida before moving to Brazil and joining Flamengo's U-14 team. Two years later he joined Vasco da Gama's U-17 setup, with which he played for over a year. In 2019, Vasco loaned Mendonca to Trindade.

Mendonca returned to Miami to play with USL League Two’s FC Miami City in 2021.

=== Minnesota United FC 2 ===
On March 23, 2022, Mendonca signed his first professional contract with MLS Next Pro side Minnesota United FC 2 ahead of their 2022 season. Mendonca quickly established himself as an important player in the midfield for MNUFC2, appearing in 23 matches and recorded 3 assists in his first professional campaign.

=== North Texas SC ===
On March 8, 2024, Mendonca joined North Texas SC as a free agent. On March 15, 2024, Mendonca made his debut with North Texas SC, appearing as starter in the opening match of the season, a 0–0 draw against Whitecaps FC 2. In his one season in Texas, Mendonca helped the club capture the MLS Next Pro Cup. He finished the season appearing in 22 league matches and 3 playoff matches.

=== Chattanooga FC ===
On January 7, 2025, Mendonca joined Chattanooga FC to a one-year contract. On March 8, 2025, Mendonca made his debut with the club, appearing as a starter in a 2–1 victory over Inter Miami CF II. Mendonca ended his 2025 campaign appearing in 25 regular season matches and 2 in the U.S. Open Cup.

=== New York Cosmos ===
On December 17, 2025, Mendonca joined USL League One side New York Cosmos ahead of their return to professional competition. Mendonca made his debut for the club on March 14, 2026, appearing as a late match substitute in a 1-3 loss to Hearts of Pine. On March 25, 2026, Mendonca scored his first goal as a professional with Cosmos in a 3-2 loss to Greenville Triumph. On May 15, 2026, Mendonca scored and 81st minute equalizing goal in a 3-2 comeback victory over Westchester SC in a USL Cup match.

== International ==
Mendonca has represented the United States men's national soccer team at the youth level, earning two call-ups to the U-15 and U-16 national teams.

== Career statistics ==
As of match played 4 November 2026

Appearances and goals by club, season and competition
Club	Season	League			National cup		League cup		Other		Total	
Club	Season	Division	Apps	Goals	Apps	Goals	Apps	Goals	Apps	Goals	Apps	Goals
FC Miami City	2021	USL League Two	1	0	0	0	—		0	0	1	0
Minnesota United FC 2	2022	MLS Next Pro	23	0	0	0	0	0	0	0	23	0
North Texas SC	2024	MLS Next Pro	22	0	0	0	0	0	3	0	25	0
Chattanooga FC	2025	MLS Next Pro	25	0	2	0	0	0	0	0	27	0
New York Cosmos	2026	USL League One	24	1	0	0	3	1	0	0	27	2
Career total			95	1	2	0	3	1	3	0	103	2
