= Davide Materazzi =

Italian footballer (born 2001)

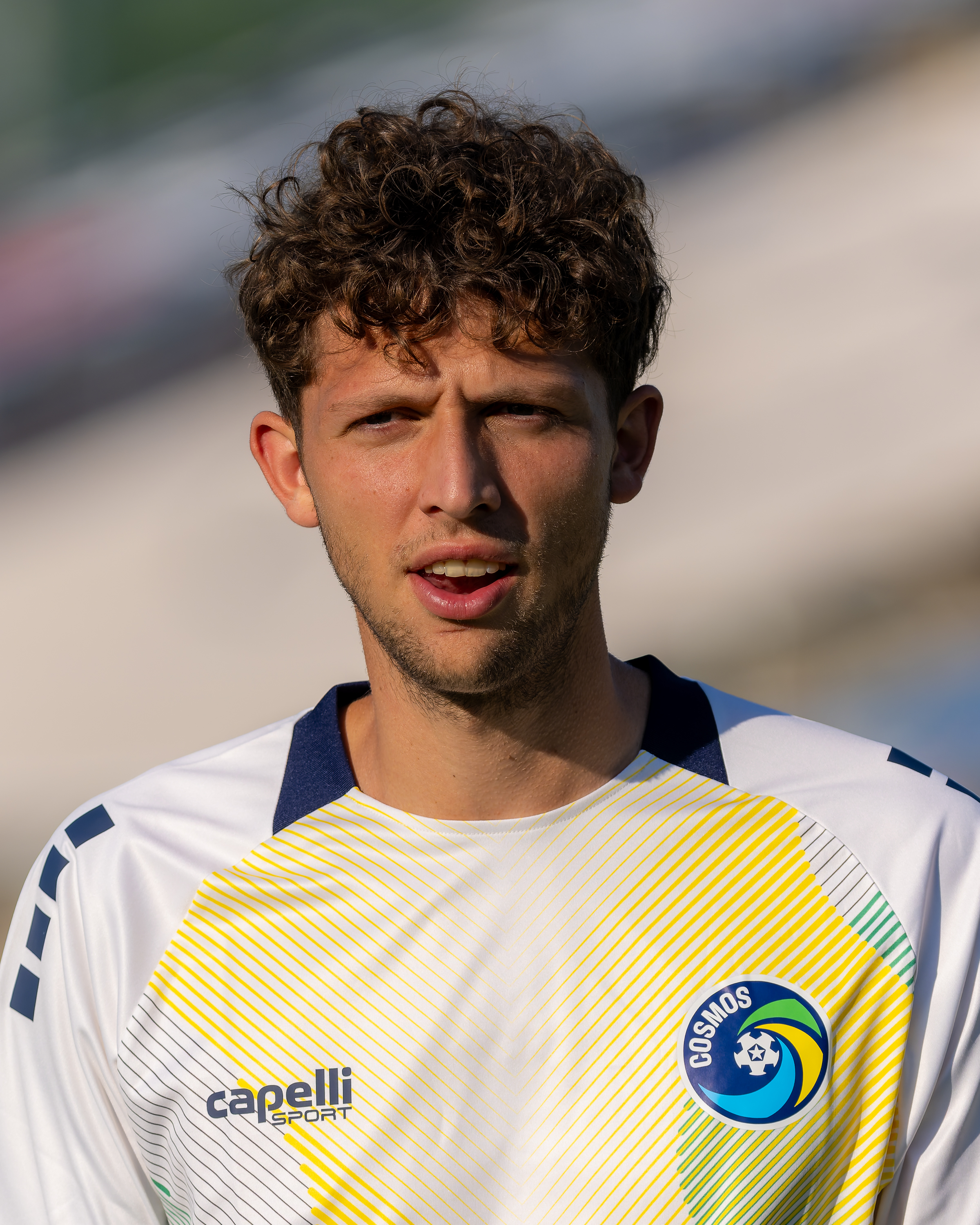
- Materazzi with NY Cosmos in 2026

Personal information
- Full name: Davide Materazzi
- Date of birth: 28 October 2001 (age 25)
- Place of birth: Milan, Italy
- Height: 1.93 m (6 ft 4 in)
- Position: Defender

Team information
- Current team: New York Cosmos
- Number: 23

Youth career
- AC Perugia
- –2020: Foligno

College career
Years	Team	Apps	(Gls)
2020–2022	Davis & Elkins Senators	37	(8)
2023–2024	James Madison Dukes	31	(4)

Senior career*
Years	Team	Apps	(Gls)
2019–2020	Foligno	1	(0)
2022–2025	Lionsbridge FC	55	(5)
2026–	New York Cosmos	5	(0)
- * Club domestic league appearances and goals as of 31 October 2026

Davide Materazzi (born 28 October 2001) is an Italian professional footballer who plays as a defender for New York Cosmos in the USL League One.

== Career ==
=== Youth, college and amateur ===
Davide Materazzi, the son of former Italian international Marco Materazzi, was born in Milan, Italy. Materazzi began his footballing career with the AC Perugia and then the Foligno youth teams. He made his debut in the lower divisions of Italian football, making his senior team debut with Foligno in 2019. On 5 October 2019 he debuted in Serie D with Foligno, coming on as a second half substitute in a 5–0 victory over Tuttocuoio.

In 2020, Materazzi moved to the United States to play college soccer with Davis & Elkins College. He played three seasons with the Senators, making 37 appearances and scoring eight goals.

In 2023, Materazzi transferred to James Madison, where he played a further two seasons at the college level. He scored four goals in 31 appearances for the Dukes. He led the Dukes to the 2023 NCAA Tournament Round of 16 after scoring the only goal of the match, in a 1–0 victory over Georgetown.

From 2022 to 2025, Materazzi also played in the USL League Two with Lionsbridge FC. He was a key defender for the Newport News side, helping them reach the 2023 national final. He ended his time at the club third all-time in appearances with 56 games, while scoring 5 goals.

=== Professional ===
==== New York Cosmos ====
On December 3, 2025, Materazzi signed his first professional contract with USL League One side New York Cosmos ahead of their return to professional competition.

== Career statistics ==
As of match played 12 July 2026

Appearances and goals by club, season and competition
Club	Season	League			National cup		League cup		Other		Total	
Club	Season	Division	Apps	Goals	Apps	Goals	Apps	Goals	Apps	Goals	Apps	Goals
Foligno	2019-2020	Serie D	1	0	0	0	0	0	0	0	1	0
Lionsbridge FC	2022	USL League Two	15	3	0	0	0	0	0	0	15	3
Lionsbridge FC	2023	USL League Two	17	1	1	0	0	0	0	0	18	1
Lionsbridge FC	2024	USL League Two	11	1	0	0	0	0	0	0	11	1
Lionsbridge FC	2025	USL League Two	12	0	0	0	0	0	0	0	12	0
Lionsbridge FC	Total		55	5	1	0	0	0	0	0	56	5
New York Cosmos	2026	USL League One	5	0	0	0	2	0	0	0	7	0
Career total			61	5	1	0	2	0	0	0	64	5
