= Davide Corti =

Italian football manager

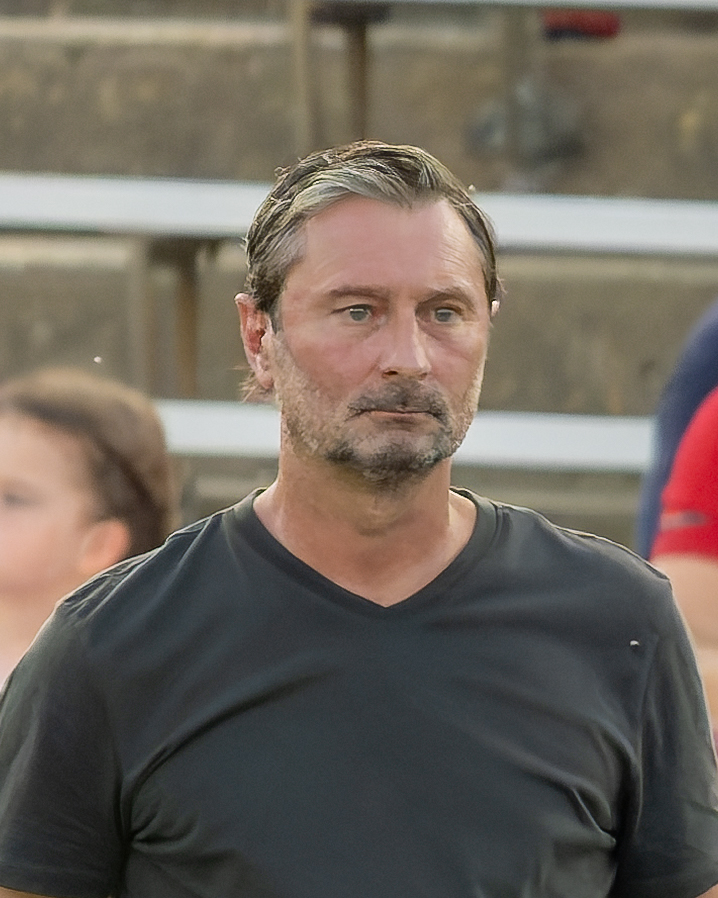
- Corti with the NY Cosmos in 2026

Personal information
- Full name: Davide Corti
- Date of birth: 31 July 1972 (age 54)
- Place of birth: Milan, Italy
- Height: 1.82 m (6 ft 0 in)
- Position: Defender

Team information
- Current team: New York Cosmos

Youth career
- 1982–1990: AC Milan

Senior career*
Years	Team	Apps	(Gls)
1990–1992	AC Milan	0	(0)
1992–1993	Empoli FC	14	(0)
1993–1996	Pro Sesto 1913	81	(3)
1996–1997	Brescello Calcio	35	(1)
1997–1999	Novara Calcio	54	(1)
1999	ASD Castel di Sangro	1	(0)
1999–2000	Brescello Calcio	8	(0)
2000–2002	AC Meda 1913	46	(0)
2002–2003	AC Legnano	24	(0)

Managerial career
- 2021–2023: AC Milan Women U19
- 2023–2024: AC Milan Women
- 2024: UC Sampdoria (women)
- 2025–: New York Cosmos
- * Club domestic league appearances and goals as of 24 January 2025

Davide Corti (born 31 July 1972) is a former Italian footballer who is the manager for USL League One club New York Cosmos.

== Playing career ==
Born in Milan, Italy, Corti began his playing career in the youth academy of AC Milan. On November 21, 1990, he was substituted into the Coppa Italia match against US Lecce in the 42nd minute, making his first and only competitive appearance for the Milanese club. In the summer of 1992, he left Milan and moved to Empoli FC in Serie C. In the following years, he played for many lower-league teams in Italy before ending his career at AC Legnano after the 2002/03 season.

== Coaching career ==
Upon his retirement, Corti began working as the youth technical director for AS Ostia Mare Lido Calcio, a Serie D club outside Rome, eventually coaching the clubs first team. From 2005 to 2017, Corti worked as a scout and technical director in the youth academy of AC Milan. Between March and May 2016, he attended the UEFA coaching course and subsequently received the UEFA A coaching license.

In 2017, he was named technical director for New Jersey youth club Cedar Stars Academy. He then moved to partner club New Jersey Rush before returning to Italy in 2021.

In early July 2021, he took over as head coach of the newly formed U19 women's youth team of AC Milan Women. In both the 2021/22 and 2022/23 seasons, Corti led the youth team to the Final Four of the Primavera youth league. In both cases, however, they were eliminated in the semi-finals by eventual champions AS Roma. Following a poor start to the 2023/24 season, he took over as head coach of the first women's team at the end of November 2023, replacing Maurizio Ganz.

In 2024 Corti then was hired as head coach for UC Sampdoria (women), but he departed the Genoa club in November 2024.

On September 4, 2025, Corti was hired as the head coach for New York Cosmos, as the club returns to professional soccer in 2026 in USL League One.
