= Darren Sidoel =

Dutch footballer (born 1998)

Personal information
- Full name: Darren Devlin Sidoel
- Date of birth: 10 March 1998 (age 28)
- Place of birth: The Hague, Netherlands
- Height: 1.80 m (5 ft 11 in)
- Position: Defensive midfielder

Team information
- Current team: New York Cosmos
- Number: 33

Youth career
- –2012: Den Haag
- 2012–2017: Ajax

Senior career*
Years	Team	Apps	(Gls)
2016–2018	Jong Ajax	16	(1)
2018–2019	Reading	0	(0)
2019	→ Roeselare (loan)	11	(0)
2019–2020	Arda Kardzhali	16	(0)
2020–2021	Córdoba	1	(0)
2021	→ Hércules (loan)	4	(1)
2021–2022	East Bengal	11	(3)
2023–2025	AB	30	(3)
2025	Grindavík	8	(0)
2026–	New York Cosmos	12	(1)

International career
2013	Netherlands U15	4	(0)
2013	Netherlands U16	7	(0)
2014	Netherlands U17	5	(0)
- * Club domestic league appearances and goals as of 28 July 2026

Darren Devlin Sidoel (born 10 March 1998) is a Dutch professional footballer who plays as a defensive midfielder for New York Cosmos in the USL League One. Besides the Netherlands, he has also played in England, Belgium, Bulgaria, India, Spain, and the United States.

== Club career ==
=== Ajax ===
Sidoel started his career with ADO Den Haag before joining AFC Ajax in 2012. He made his debut with Jong Ajax, the reserve side of Ajax in 2017, and would score his first professional goal on 18 August 2017, the opening goal in a 2–1 victory over SC Cambuur. He appeared in 16 matches, scoring one goal as Jong Ajax were crowned 2017/18 Eerste Divisie champions.

=== Reading ===
After making his debut in the Eerste Divisie for Jong Ajax in the 2017–18 season, Sidoel signed for English club Reading on a three-year contract in July 2018. On 4 January 2019, Sidoel was sent on loan to Belgian side KSV Roeselare. Sidoel made his debut for Roeselare on 4 February 2019, starting at center back in a 1–0 victory over OH Leuven. Sidoel received praise by the media for his performance during the match. During his stay with the club he appeared in 11 matches as a starter. He returned to Reading at the end of the loan, and on 8 July 2019, Sidoel left Reading by mutual consent.

=== Arda Kardzhali ===
On 8 August 2019, Sidoel signed a two-year contract with Arda Kardzhali. He completed his debut on 23 August 2019 in a league match against Cherno More Varna.

=== Córdoba CF and Hércules CF ===
On 17 July 2020, Sidoel signed a 1-year contract with Córdoba CF. On 1 February 2021 was loaned to Segunda División B club Hércules CF for the rest of the season. On 23 May 2021, Sidoel scored for Hércules in a 3–3 draw over UE Llagostera, an insufficient result as the club needed a win to avoid relegation.

=== East Bengal ===
On 17 September 2021, Sidoel signed with Indian Super League side SC East Bengal and made his debut on 27 November in a 3–0 defeat to ATK Mohun Bagan. In the next match on 30 November, he scored his first goal against Odisha FC, but lost the match by 6–4.

=== AB ===
In September 2023, Sidoel joined Danish 2nd Division side AB. Sidoel scored his first goal with AB on 30 September 2023, in a 2–1 victory over Thisted FC. On 14 April 2024, in the promotion playoffs, Sidoel scored the winning goal in a 2–1 victory over Esbjerg fB. On 27 April 2024, Sidoel scored the loan goal in a 1–0 victory over Nykøbing FC. On 1 February 2025 Sidoel and AB agreed to a contract termination, after having appeared in 36 matches and scoring 3 goals with the club.

=== Grindavík ===
On 19 July 2025, Sidoel joined Icelandic side Grindavík. He started eight of nine matches before departing the club.

=== New York Cosmos ===
On December 17, 2025, Sidoel joined USL League One side New York Cosmos ahead of their return to professional competition.

== International career ==
Sidoel represented the Netherlands at under-17 youth level. He is of Indonesian and Surinamese descent. In an interview for a local media, right after he had joined Arda Kardzhali in 2019, Siddoel expressed his desire to represent the Indonesia national team, but would first concentrate on his club career.

== Career statistics ==
=== Club ===
As of 28 May 2026

Appearances and goals by club, season and competition
Club	Season	League			Cup		Continental		Total	
Club	Season	Division	Apps	Goals	Apps	Goals	Apps	Goals	Apps	Goals
Jong Ajax	2016–17	Eerste Divisie	0	0	0	0	3 (Note: Appearance(s) in UEFA Youth League)	0	3	0
Jong Ajax	2017–18	Eerste Divisie	16	1	0	0	3	1	19	2
Jong Ajax	Total		16	1	0	0	6	1	22	2
Reading U23	2018–19	Premier League 2	6	0	0	0	–		0	0
Roeselare (loan)	2018–19	Belgian First Division B	11	0	0	0	–		11	0
Arda Kardzhali	2019–20	First League	16	0	2 (Note: Appearance(s) in Bulgarian Cup)	0	–		18	0
Córdoba	2020–21	Segunda División B	1	0	0	0	–		1	0
Hércules (loan)	2020–21	Segunda División B	4	1	0	0	–		4	1
East Bengal	2021–22	Indian Super League	11	3	0	0	–		11	3
AB	2023–24	Danish 2nd Division	21	3	4	0	–		25	3
AB	2024–25	Danish 2nd Division	9	0	2	0	–		11	0
Grindavík	2025–26	1. deild karla	8	0	0	0	–		8	0
NY Cosmos	2026	USL League One	12	1	2	0	–		14	1
Career total			115	9	10	0	6	1	131	10

== Honours ==
=== Club ===
Jong Ajax

- Eerste Divisie: 2017–18
