= Lamin Jawneh =

Gambian footballer (born 1995)

Personal information
- Date of birth: October 31, 1995 (age 31)
- Place of birth: Banjul, The Gambia
- Height: 5 ft 8 in (1.73 m)
- Position: Left winger

Senior career*
Years	Team	Apps	(Gls)
2017	Inter Nashville	0	(0)
2018	SGFC Eagles Maryland	0	(0)
2018–2019	Ialysos	0	(0)
2019	→ Phoebus Kremasti (loan)	0	(0)
2020	Atlanta United 2	11	(0)
2021	Moca	25	(4)
2022	Phoenix Rising	7	(0)
2023	Apotheos FC	8	(3)
2024	Georgia Lions	9	(1)
2025	Texoma FC	26	(1)
2026	New York Cosmos	23	(7)
- * Club domestic league appearances and goals as of 13:10, 3 November 2026 (UTC)

Lamin Bunja Jawneh (born 31 October 1995) is a Gambian footballer who plays as a left-winger for New York Cosmos in the USL League One.

== Career ==
=== Early career ===
Born in Banjul, The Gambia, Jawneh began his career in the United States lower-leagues with NPSL sides Inter Nashville and SGFC Eagles Maryland, before moving to Greek side Ialysos following a trial with the club.

=== Atlanta United 2 ===
On 23 January 2020, Jawneh signed with USL Championship side Atlanta United 2. The left-winger made his debut for the club on 8 March 2020, coming on in the second half in a 1–0 loss to Charleston Battery. He would make 11 appearances for the Atlanta side.

=== Moca FC ===
For the 2021 season, Jawneh signed with Moca FC of Liga Dominicana de Fútbol. On 9 June 2021, Jawneh scored for Moca in a 4-0 victory over Delfines del Este FC. On 11 July 2021, Jawneh scored his clubs second goal in a 5-1 victory over Atlántico FC. On 25 September 2021, he recorded a goal and an assist in a 2–0 home win against Universidad O&M FC. He ended his season with 25 appearances and 4 goals.

=== Phoenix Rising ===
On 22 June 2022, Jawneh signed with Phoenix Rising FC on a 25-day contract. On 14 July, Jawneh's contract was extended through the end of the 2022 season. On 21 October, Phoenix Rising announced they had declined the 2023 contract option for Jawneh.

=== Apotheos FC ===
Jawneh joined Atlanta club Apotheos FC for the 2023 National Premier Soccer League season. He helped the club win the Southeast Conference regular season title. On 12 July 2023 he helped the club reach the conference final after scoring two goals in a 4-1 victory over Charlottetowne Hops FC. On 15 July 2023 he scored an 85th minute equalizer in the conference final, helping his club overcome a 2-0 deficit and eventually force extra time against Georgia Revolution FC, a match Apotheos would win 4-3.

=== Georgia Lions ===
On 11 April 2024, Jawneh joined Georgia Lions FC (also known as Georgia FC) of the National Independent Soccer Association (NISA). On 22 June 2024, he scored for Georgia, a pk goal in a 2–1 loss to Maryland Bobcats FC. He appeared in 9 games, logging 810 minutes and recorded 1 goal and 1 assist.

=== Texoma FC ===
Jawneh joined USL League One side Texoma FC on 13 February 2025, ahead of the club's inaugural season. On 28 June 2025, Jawneh scored his first goal for the club in a 5–4 loss to his former club Phoenix Rising FC in a USL Cup match. On 20 August 2025, he scored his first league goal for Texoma in a 3–3 draw with AV Alta. Jawneh appeared in 31 matches for Texoma, scoring 2 goals and providing 5 assists, playing primarily as a winger or fullback.

=== New York Cosmos ===
Jawneh signed with USL League One side New York Cosmos on 14 May 2026. Jawneh scored his first goal with Cosmos on 19 August 2026, opening the scoring in a 2-0 victory over Corpus Christi FC. On 5 September 2026, Jawneh recorded his first brace as a professional, helping Cosmos to a 4-2 victory over Fort Wayne FC. On 27 September 2026, Jawneh scored for Cosmos in a 3-2 victory over Richmond Kickers.

== Career statistics ==
As of match played November 3, 2026

Appearances and goals by club, season and competition
Club	Season	League			National Cup		League Cup		Other		Total	
Club	Season	Division	Apps	Goals	Apps	Goals	Apps	Goals	Apps	Goals	Apps	Goals
Atlanta United 2	2020	USL Championship	11	0	0	0	0	0	0	0	11	0
Moca FC	2021	Liga Dominicana de Fútbol	25	4	0	0	0	0	0	0	25	4
Phoenix Rising FC	2022	USL Championship	7	0	0	0	0	0	0	0	7	0
Apotheos FC	2023	National Premier Soccer League	8	3	1	0	0	0	0	0	9	3
Georgia Lions	2024	National Independent Soccer Association	9	1	0	0	0	0	0	0	9	1
Texoma FC	2025	USL League One	26	1	1	0	4	1	0	0	31	2
New York Cosmos	2026	USL League One	23	7	0	0	1	0	0	0	24	7
Career total			109	16	2	0	5	1	0	0	116	17
