= Patrick Bohui =

American soccer player (born 2003)

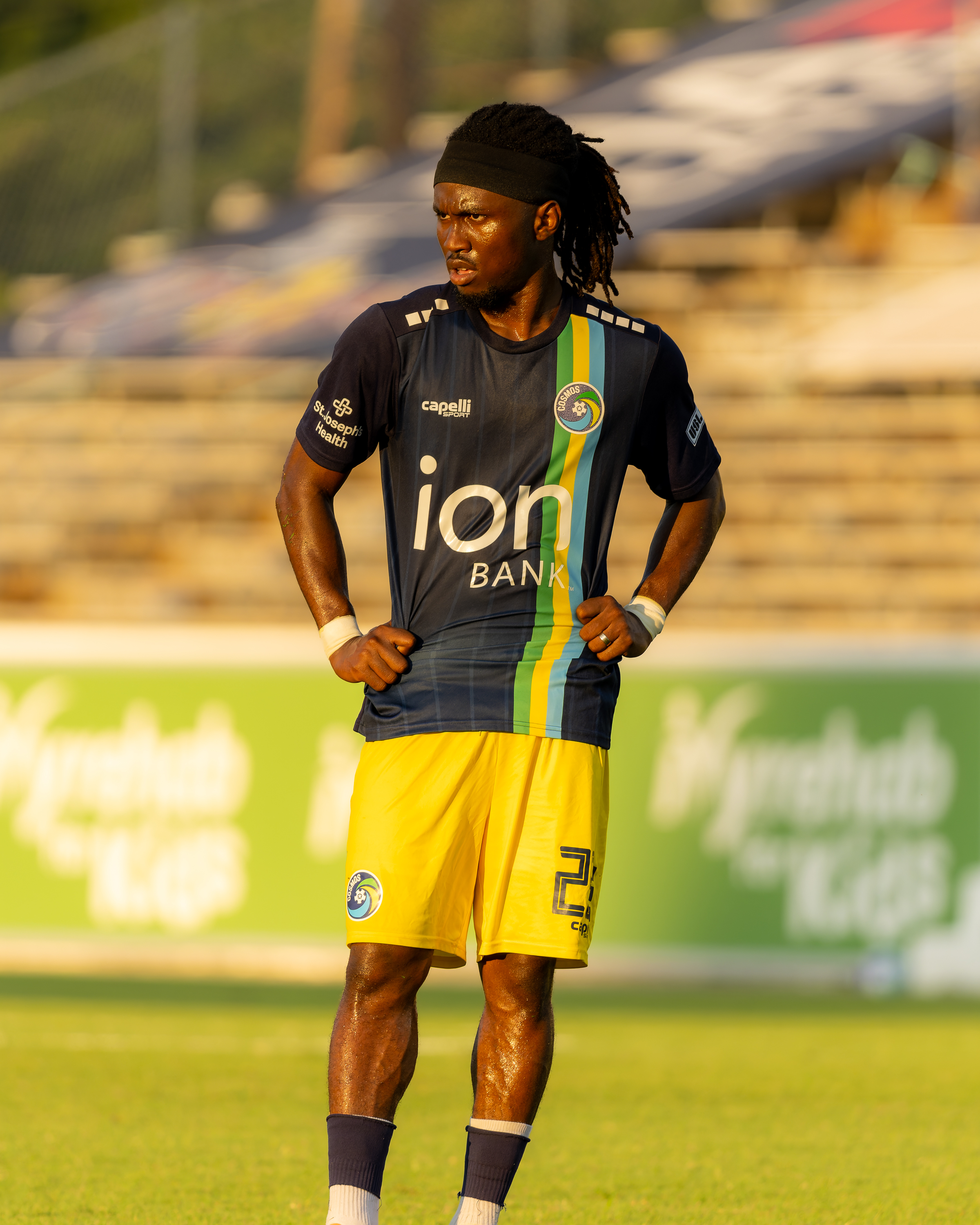
- Bohui with NY Cosmos in 2026

Personal information
- Full name: Anges Patrick Kader Bohui
- Date of birth: December 3, 2003 (age 22)
- Place of birth: Abidjan, Ivory Coast
- Height: 5 ft 10 in (1.78 m)
- Position: Forward

Team information
- Current team: New York Cosmos
- Number: 22

Youth career
- 2017–2020: Philadelphia Union
- 2020–2021: FC Cincinnati
- 2022: Vejle

Senior career*
Years	Team	Apps	(Gls)
2019–2020	Philadelphia Union II	20	(2)
2022–2023	Vejle	0	(0)
2023	FC Vizela	0	(0)
2023	Columbus Crew 2	6	(2)
2024–2025	Portimonense	1	(0)
2025–2026	Naval 1893	4	(0)
2026–	New York Cosmos	15	(0)

International career
2018–2019	United States U16	3	(0)
- * Club domestic league appearances and goals as of November 1, 2026

Anges Patrick Kader Bohui (born December 3, 2003) is a professional soccer player who plays for USL League One club New York Cosmos. Born in the Ivory Coast, he represented the United States at youth level.

== Career ==
Born in Abidjan, Ivory Coast, Bohui moved to the United States as a youth and joined the Philadelphia Union Academy in 2017, where he played a few years on the academy teams.

In November 2020, he joined the academy of FC Cincinnati. In Cincinnati, he only made two appearances and scored one goal for the club's U-19s.

=== Philadelphia Union II ===
Bohui made his professional debut for Philadelphia Union II in the USL Championship in 2019. On September 1, 2019, he became the youngest player to start a match for the club, at 15 years, eight months and 29 days old, playing 62 minutes in a 2–0 victory over Swope Park Rangers. He went on to make a total of eight appearances throughout the season. He scored his first goal as a professional on August 5, 2020, opening the scoring for Union II, in a 3–2 victory over New York Red Bulls II. He scored two goals and added three assists in 12 appearances in the USL Championship in 2020 for Philadelphia Union II.

=== Vejle ===
After a trial period in the autumn 2020, Bohui signed a deal with Danish Superliga club Vejle Boldklub on 14 January 2022. During his time in Denmark, he appeared in 14 matches for Vejle Boldklub's U-19s, scoring six goals.

=== Vizela ===
On January 26, 2023, Bohui was transferred to Liga Portugal 2 side FC Vizela. In nine appearances with F.C. Vizela's Under-23 squad he scored one goal.

=== Columbus Crew 2 ===
On August 10, 2023, Bohui returned to the United States, signing an MLS Next Pro contract with Columbus Crew 2. He scored his first goal for Columbus Crew 2 on August 19, 2023, in 5–1 victory over FC Cincinnati 2. He also scored for Columbus on September 17, 2023, in a 4–0 victory over FC Cincinnati 2. He ended his time in Columbus appearing in six matches and scoring two goal.

=== Portimonense ===
In 2024 Bohui returned to Portugal, signing with Liga Portugal 2 side Portimonense S.C.. He made his debut with Portimonense on November 30, 2024, appearing as a late substitute in a 2–1 loss to GD Chaves.

=== Naval 1893 ===
For the 2025 season Bohui signed with fourth-tier Campeonato de Portugal side Naval 1893. He made his debut for the club on September 21, 2025, coming on in the 72nd minute in a 1–0 loss to Leixões S.C. in the Taça de Portugal. On September 28, 2025, he made his league debut for Naval, assisting on the first goal of the match in a 3–1 victory over A.C. Marinhense.

=== New York Cosmos ===
On January 17, 2026, Bohui joined USL League One side New York Cosmos ahead of their return to professional competition. Bohui made his debut for the club on March 14, 2026, appearing as a second-half substitute in a 1–3 loss to Hearts of Pine.

== International ==
Bohui was called up to the United States U16 national team in 2018.

He was also called up to United States U20 national team during January 2022.

== Career statistics ==
As of match played December 24, 2025

Appearances and goals by club, season and competition
Club	Season	League			National cup		League cup		Other		Total	
Club	Season	Division	Apps	Goals	Apps	Goals	Apps	Goals	Apps	Goals	Apps	Goals
Philadelphia Union II	2019	USL Championship	8	0	0	0	—		0	0	8	0
Philadelphia Union II	2020	USL Championship	12	2	0	0	—		0	0	12	2
Philadelphia Union II	Total		20	2	0	0	0	0	0	0	20	2
Vejle	2022-2023	Danish Superliga	0	0	0	0	0	0	0	0	0	0
F.C. Vizela	2022-2023	Liga Portugal 2	0	0	0	0	0	0	0	0	0	0
Columbus Crew 2	2023	MLS Next Pro	5	2	0	0	0	0	1	0	6	2
Portimonense	2024-2025	Liga Portugal 2	1	0	0	0	0	0	0	0	1	0
Naval 1893	2025-2026	Campeonato de Portugal	4	0	1	0	0	0	0	0	5	0
New York Cosmos	2026	USL League One	0	0	0	0	0	0	0	0	0	0
Career total			30	4	1	0	0	0	1	0	32	4
