= New York Cosmos (2026) =

Professional soccer club in Paterson, New Jersey

- Founded: February 14, 2025; 21 months ago
- Ground: Hinchliffe Stadium; Paterson, New Jersey
- Capacity: 7,500
- Owners: Baye Adofo-Wilson (majority); Paterson Restoration Corporation; Mediacom
- Chairman: Baye Adofo-Wilson
- Head coach: Davide Corti
- League: USL League One
- Website: nycosmos.com
Home colors	Away colors

The New York Cosmos (also known as simply the Cosmos) are an American professional soccer club based in Paterson, New Jersey, within the Greater New York area. The club is majority-owned by Baye Adofo-Wilson, and competes in the third-division USL League One. It is the third iteration of the Cosmos, after the original team, which played from 1971 to 1985, and its immediate predecessor, which played parts of six seasons between 2013 and 2020.

== History ==
=== Background ===
The original New York Cosmos was founded in 1970 by ten executives from Atlantic Records and its parent company Warner Communications, most notably Atlantic's Ahmet and Nesuhi Ertegun and Warner's CEO Steve Ross. They began play in the original North American Soccer League (NASL), and signed international superstars such as Pelé and Franz Beckenbauer, becoming "the most glamorous team in world football". Although the club was hugely successful, winning the league five times, the club folded in 1985 after the NASL's demise and floundering attendance for their Major Indoor Soccer League team.

With Major League Soccer's (MLS) rise at the turn of the century, the league sought a second club in the New York metropolitan area alongside the New York Red Bulls, preferably one that could revive the Cosmos name.

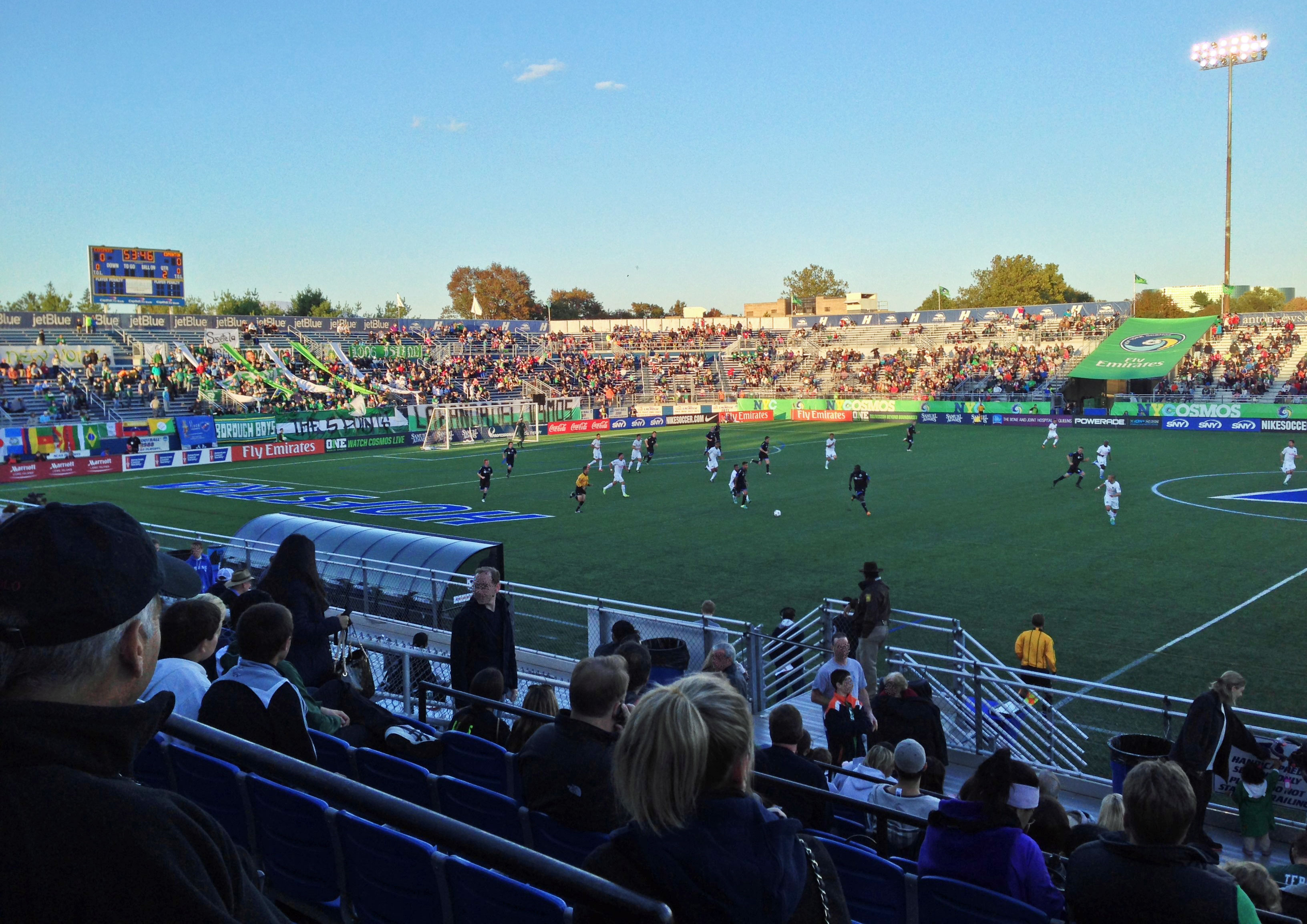
The second iteration of the Cosmos in Shuart Stadium, October 2013

A group funded by the sovereign wealth fund of Saudi Arabia bought the Cosmos name and logo in 2010 with ambitions to play in MLS, but shortly thereafter declined the league's offer to join (New York City FC would take the spot). They joined instead the second-division NASL revival starting in the second half of the 2013 season. Despite winning the league three times, the second Cosmos organization was plagued by low attendance and poor financial management and went on two prolonged hiatuses; once in 2017 after the revived NASL folded, and again in 2021 following half a season in the third-division National Independent Soccer Association. The second Cosmos continued to exist as a legal entity and occasional clothing brand, and were involved in the NASL's unsuccessful lawsuit against the MLS and U.S. Soccer over a sanctioning dispute.

=== Foundation ===
After obtaining franchise rights for a USL League One team in February 2025, "North Jersey Pro Soccer", a group based in the city of Paterson, New Jersey led by Baye Adofo-Wilson, purchased a majority stake in the Cosmos and full ownership of the club's intellectual property, intending to apply the name and logo to their new team. The Cosmos branding was unveiled in July. The club announced plans to field a men's team into USL League One in its 2026 season, and possibly a women's team at some point in the future.

Davide Corti was announced as the first coach in the club's history was announced in September 2025. He is the ninth head coach of the various New York Cosmos clubs, and the first Italian.

=== 2026 season ===
The Cosmos opened their inaugural USL season at Hinchliffe Stadium against the Portland Hearts of Pine on March 14, 2026. The Hearts of Pine won, 3–1, with the first goal at Hinchliffe being scored by the Hearts' Konstantinos Georgallides and the first Cosmos goal scored by Darren Sidoel. The club lost their next two matches as well, but won their first match with a 2–0 victory over fellow expansion side Fort Wayne FC on March 28.

In June, the team hosted Liga MX side Santos Laguna at Hinchliffe Stadium in an international friendly, losing 2–1 in front of over 1,000 fans.

== Organization ==
The club is owned by real estate developer Baye Adofo-Wilson and former Red Bull and second Cosmos executive Erik Stover. Rocco B. Commisso, who had held the rights to the Cosmos' name and identity from 2017 onwards and was a majority owner of Serie A's ACF Fiorentina, was a minority owner of the club through his company New York Cosmos LLC until his passing on January 16, 2026. In July 2025, Giuseppe Rossi, a New Jersey native who played 30 times for the Italian national football team, joined the club as a vice chairman and director of soccer.

Although the Cosmos will "nominally identify with New York", the club plans to focus on developing soccer in New Jersey. "I believe that the real magic will be the players that we’re able to develop here in the Paterson area, in the North Jersey area," said Rossi. Stover explained that before the Cosmos was formed the state of New Jersey had only one professional soccer club for a population of 9.5 million people, and also pointed proudly to the number of New Jersey and Paterson natives who had been hired by the club.

== Branding ==
When the branding of the New York Cosmos was announced in July 2025, it was revealed that the club would be utilizing a more modernized approach to the classic crest, still retaining the typical green, yellow, and blue color scheme used by the two former Cosmos clubs. The name "New York" was dropped, leaving only the moniker "Cosmos" on the badge. Although the club retains the place name officially, it will often be referred to simply as the "Cosmos" to emphasize its connection with northern New Jersey.

New Jersey-based sportswear company Capelli Sport supplies the team's uniforms and training gear.

== Stadium ==
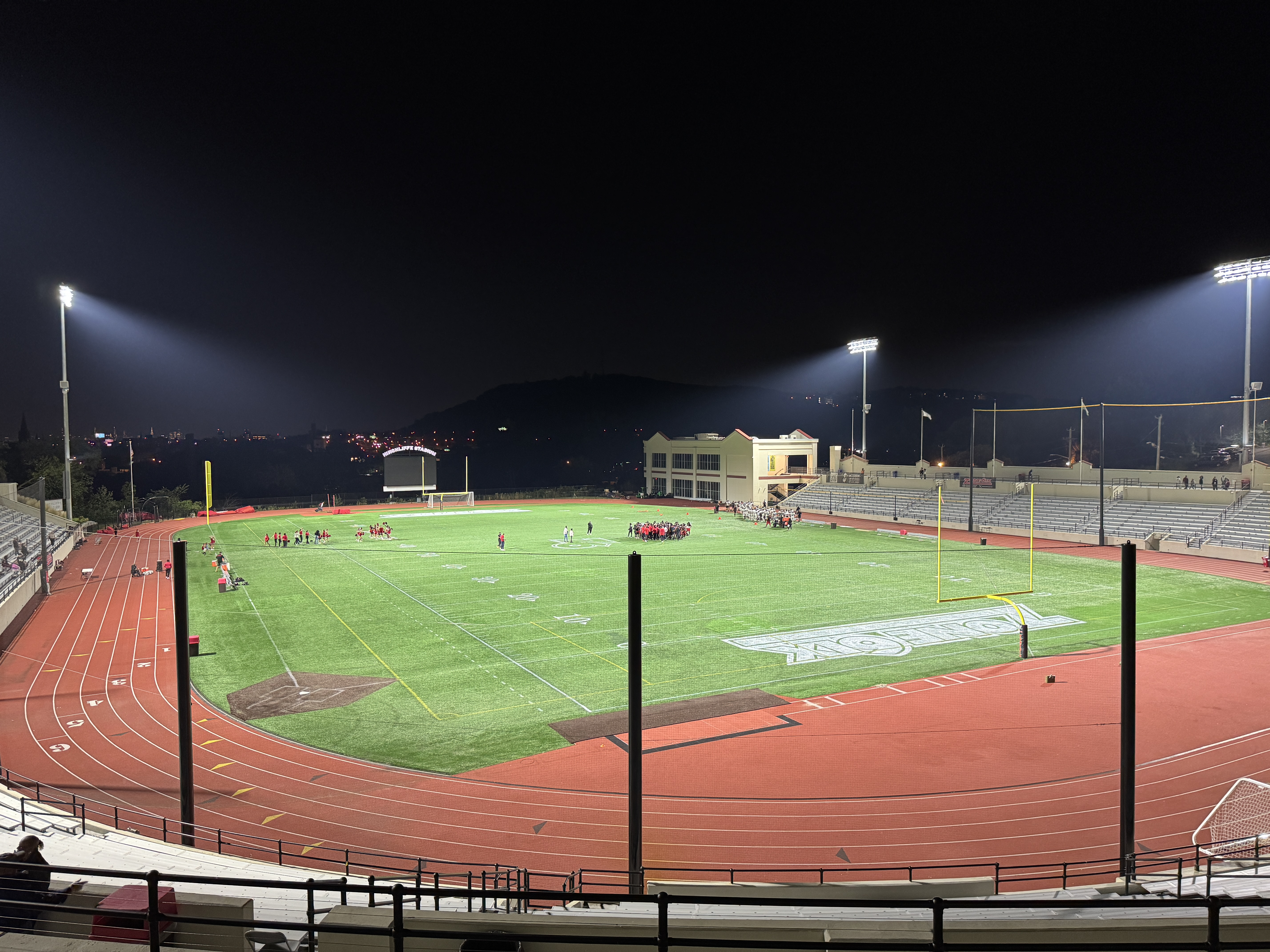
Hinchliffe Stadium pictured in 2024 set up in American football format following the stadium's renovation.

The Cosmos play at Hinchliffe Stadium, a 7,500 capacity multi-purpose stadium in Paterson, that can also host baseball, football, and track events. Hinchliffe Stadium, a part of the surrounding Great Falls National Historical Park, was built in 1932, and reopened in 2023 following a renovation required after a period of neglect that started when the stadium was abandoned in 1997. One of only six Negro League stadiums still standing, Hinchliffe Stadium currently hosts the New Jersey Jackals, a baseball team that plays in the independent Frontier League, and the Paterson Board of Education's two local high schools. Historically, Hinchliffe hosted Negro League teams such as the New York Black Yankees and New York Cubans. The stadium also has soccer history, having hosted the American Soccer League's New Jersey Eagles in 1988 and 1989.

== Players and staff ==
=== Current roster ===
As of March 21, 2026

Note: Flags indicate national team as defined under FIFA eligibility rules; some limited exceptions apply. Players may hold more than one non-FIFA nationality.

No.	Pos.	Nation	Player
1	GK	USA	Derrek Chan
2	DF	USA	Massimo Morabito
3	DF	HON	Stalyn Acosta
4	DF	ISR	Michael Chilaka
5	MF	GUA	Nestor Cabrera
6	DF	USA	Anderson Holt
7	MF	USA	Frankie Ljucovic
8	MF	USA	Ajmeer Spengler
11	FW	USA	Nick Zielonka
12	MF	BAN	Shamit Shome
13	FW	URU	Sebastián Guenzatti (captain)
14	MF	USA	Tino Puentes
15	MF	USA	Ozzie Ramos
16	DF	USA	Davey Mason
17	DF	ITA	Davide Galazzini

No.	Pos.	Nation	Player
18	FW	FRA	Christian Koffi
19	FW	GAM	Lamin Jawneh
20	DF	USA	Nick Mendonca
21	DF	USA	Braeden Backus
22	FW	USA	Patrick Bohui
23	DF	ITA	Davide Materazzi
24	DF	USA	Will Noecker
25	DF	USA	Jordan Chavez
26	GK	USA	Javier Garcia Jr.
27	FW	ECU	Josué Manzano
28	MF	USA	Justin Milovanov
29	GK	USA	Boris Del Valle*
30	GK	USA	Tristan Stephani
33	MF	NED	Darren Sidoel
36	MF	USA	William Black

Astrik denotes player-coach.

=== Retired numbers ===
The original New York Cosmos retired No. 10 for Pelé in 1977, while the New York Cosmos (2013–2020) retired No. 9 for Giorgio Chinaglia in 2014. Both numbers remain retired by the current iteration of the New York Cosmos.

No.	Player	Nation	Pos.	Tenure	No. retired	Ref.
9	Giorgio Chinaglia	Italy	FW	1976–1983	8 Jun 2014	
10	Pelé	Brazil	FW	1975–1977	1 Oct 1977	

=== Technical staff ===
As of October 2, 2026

Position	Name
Head of Soccer	(United States) Vincenzo Bernardo
Head coach	(Italy) Davide Corti
Assistant Coach	(Italy) Donato Curci (United States) Mike Gravinese
Head Goalkeeping Coach	(United States) Boris Del Valle
Head of Scout and Manager of Youth Partnerships	(Colombia) José Angulo
Team Administrator/Player Care Officer	(United States) Artian Plaha
Team Analyst	(Canada) Simon Triantafillou
Equipment Manager	Artie Verdi

=== Administrative officials ===
As of October 2, 2026

Position	Name
Chairperson and Managing Partner	(United States) Baye Adofo-Wilson
Vice Chairman	Vacant
Chief Executive Officer	Vacant
