= Erben (surname) =

Erben (Czech feminine form: Erbenová) is a surname. Notable people with the surname include:

- Andrés Rodríguez Erben, Anglican bishop of Paraguay
- Angela Finger-Erben (born 1980), German TV presenter and journalist
- Carola Helbing-Erben, German artist
- Eva Erbenová (born 1930) Israeli writer, Holocaust survivor
- Frank-Michael Erben (born 1965), german concertmaster
- František Erben (1874–1942), Czech gymnast
- Helena Erbenová (born 1979), Czech cross-country skier and triathlete
- Henry Erben (1832–1909), American admiral
- Hermann Erben (1897–1985), Austrian physician
- Holger Erbén (1915–1975), Swedish sports shooter
- Johann Balthasar Erben, German composer
- Karel Jaromír Erben (1811–1870), Czech historian and writer
- Magdalena Erbenová (born 2000), Czech ice hockey player
- Pepi Erben (1928–2025), German alpine skier
- Peter Erben, Danish electoral engineer
- Rudi Erben (fl. 1950s), West German bobsledder
- Rüdiger Erben (1967–2026), German politician
- Ulrich Erben (born 1940), German artist and painter
- Valentin Erben (born 1945), Austrian cellist
- Wilhelm Erben (1864–1933), Austrian medievalist
