= Erben =

Erben may refer to:

- Erben (surname)
- Erben Wennemars (born 1975), Dutch speed skater
- USS Erben (DD-631), American destroyer
- 40106 Erben, a minor planet
- Franz Wilhelm Langguth Erben, a German winery that uses Erben as a brand name

== See also ==
- Carl Geyling's Erben, a traditional Austrian stained glassmaker
