= 2026 Sarasota Paradise season =

Sarasota Paradise
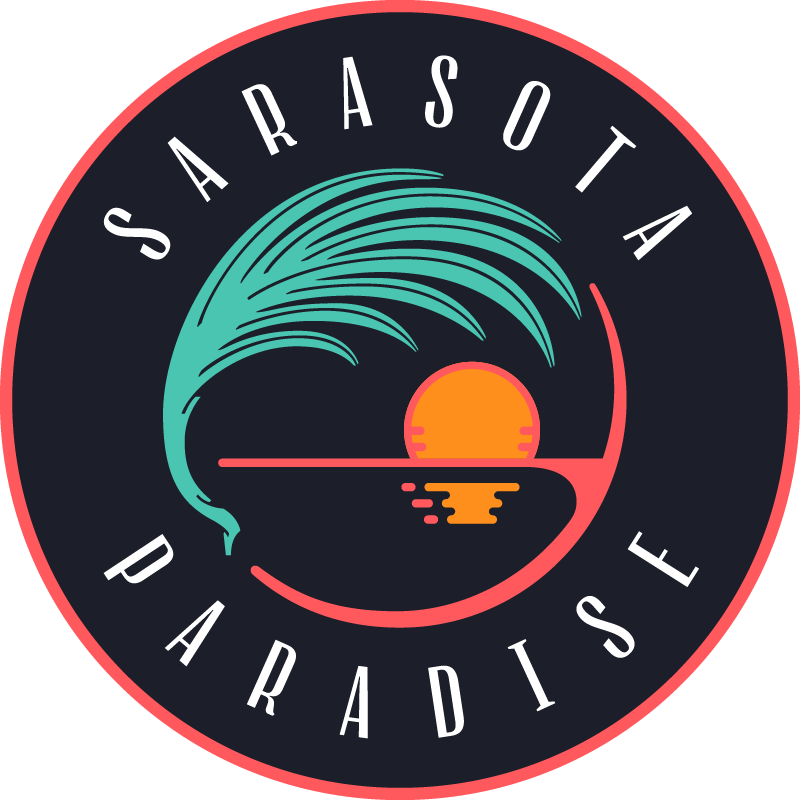
- 2026
- Owner: Marco Assis and Marcus Walfridson
- Head Coach: Mika Elovaara
- Stadium: Premier Sports Campus Lakewood Ranch, Florida
- U.S. Open Cup: NA
- USL Cup: 11th
- USL Playoffs: Did not qualify
- Top goalscorer: League: (United States) Jonathan Bolanos (9 Goals); All: (United States) Jonathan Bolanos (9 Goals)
- Highest home attendance: 2,791 vs Athletic Club Boise March 7
- Lowest home attendance: 1,406 vs Corpus Christi FC, 683 vs Sporting JAX May 13 USL Cup
- Average home league attendance: 1,740, 1,664 with USL Cup
- Biggest win: Sarasota Paradise 6–0 Greenville Triumph SC September 19
- Biggest defeat: Sarasota Paradise 0–5 Miami FC (July 11) USL Cup

The 2026 Sarasota Paradise season was the fourth and final season in the club's existence. It was the team's inaugural season in USL League One, the third-tier of American soccer. Despite playing in last year's US Open Cup, due to rule changes, Sarasota cannot compete in the U.S. Open Cup because expansion teams are not allowed to compete.

== Players and staff ==
=== Current roster ===
As of August 4, 2026

Note: Flags indicate national team as defined under FIFA eligibility rules; some limited exceptions apply. Players may hold more than one non-FIFA nationality.

| No. | Pos. | Nation | Player |
|---|---|---|---|
| 1 | GK | USA | Alex Sutton |
| 2 | DF | USA | Roberto Burlew |
| 3 | DF | USA | Reid Valentine |
| 4 | DF | IRL | Declan Watters |
| 5 | DF | SWE | Amadeus Sögaard |
| 7 | FW | USA | Ethan Bryant |
| 8 | MF | USA | Aaron Walker |
| 9 | MF | USA | Jordan Bender |
| 10 | FW | USA | Matt Cence |
| 11 | FW | USA | Sean Karani |
| 13 | FW | USA | Tristan Fredrickson |
| 14 | MF | NOR | Jørgen Pettersen |
| 16 | MF | USA | Andres Rodriguez |
| 17 | FW | USA | Jonathan Bolanos |
| 18 | MF | USA | Brendan Krueger |
| 19 | FW | USA | Garrett McLaughlin |

| No. | Pos. | Nation | Player |
|---|---|---|---|
| 20 | MF | FIN | Maximus Tainio |
| 22 | DF | SWE | Hugo Bäckstrand |
| 23 | GK | GHA | Rockson Amedeka |
| 24 | DF | USA | Kisa Kiingi (on loan from Colorado Springs Switchbacks) |
| 27 | MF | ENG | Chandler O'Dwyer |
| 28 | MF | USA | Romain Gall |
| 32 | FW | ARG | Emiliano Terzaghi |
| 36 | DF | BRA | Anderson Rosa |
| 46 | MF | NOR | Sander Røed |
| 50 | FW | USA | Dominik Brulinski |
| 51 | DF | USA | Adam Kend |
| 52 | MF | USA | Kevin Sanchez |
| 53 | MF | USA | Eeli Elovaara |
| 60 | FW | USA | Michael McGurk |
| 61 | FW | USA | Joshua Spengler |

Amateur agreement

=== Technical staff ===
| Position | Name |
|---|---|
| Head Coach & Technical Director | Mika Elovaara |
| Assistant Coach | Trevor Sinclair |
| Assistant Coach | Mark Ward |
| Assistant Coach | Glodi Konga |
| Goalkeeping Coach | Mark MacPhee |

== Transfers ==
=== In ===
| Date | Position | Number | Name | Previous club | Type | Fee | Ref. |
|---|---|---|---|---|---|---|---|
| November 12, 2025 | FW | 19 | (United States) Garrett McLaughlin | (United States) Forward Madison FC | Signing | NA | |
| November 19, 2025 | MF | 20 | (Finland) Maximus Tainio | (Finland) Jippo | Signing | NA | |
| November 26, 2025 | DF | 3 | (United States) Roberto Burlew | (United States) Sarasota Paradise | Re-signing | NA | |
| December 3, 2025 | MF | 14 | (Norway) Jørgen Pettersen | (Iceland) ÍBV | Signing | NA | |
| December 10, 2025 | MF | 46 | (Norway) Sander Roed | (Norway) Hønefoss | Signing | NA | |
| December 15, 2025 | MF | 27 | (England) Chandler O'Dwyer | (United States) Richmond Kickers | Signing | NA | |
| December 18, 2025 | DF | 36 | (Brazil) Anderson Rosa | (United States) Colorado Rapids 2 | Signing | NA | |
| December 23, 2025 | MF | 16 | (United States) Andres Rodriguez | (United States) VCU Rams | Signing | NA | |
| December 29, 2025 | DF | 6 | (Puerto Rico) Callum Stretch | (United States) South Georgia Tormenta FC | Signing | NA | |
| January 9, 2026 | DF | 4 | (Republic of Ireland) Declan Watters | (United States) Chattanooga Red Wolves SC | Signing | NA | |
| January 16, 2026 | GK | 1 | (United States) Alex Sutton | (United States) Carolina Core FC | Signing | NA | |
| January 20, 2026 | DF | 2 | (United States) Reid Valentine | (United States) Texoma FC | Signing | NA | |
| January 23, 2026 | MF | 18 | (United States) Brendan Krueger | (United States) High Point Panthers | Signing | NA | |
| January 28, 2026 | MF | 17 | (United States) Jonathan Bolanos | (United States) Westchester SC | Signing | NA | |
| February 4, 2026 | FW | 11 | (United States) Sean Karani | (United States) LA Galaxy | Signing | NA | |
| February 10, 2026 | MF | 8 | (United States) Aaron Walker | (United States) South Georgia Tormenta FC | Signing | NA | |
| February 12, 2026 | MF | 10 | (United States) Matt Cence | (United States) UMass Minutemen | Signing | NA | |
| February 27, 2026 | MF | 7 | (United States) Ethan Bryant | (United States) Monterey Bay FC | Signing | NA | |
| March 13, 2026 | GK | 23 | (Ghana) Rockson Amedeka | (Ghana) Right to Dream Academy | Signing | NA | |
| March 24, 2026 | DF | 51 | (United States) Adam Kend | (Spain) SD Huesca | Academy Contract | NA | |
| March 24, 2026 | FW | 50 | (United States) Dominik Brulinski | (United States) Two Bridges FC | Academy Contract | NA | |
| March 24, 2026 | MF | 52 | (United States) Kevin Sanchez | (United States) Richmond Kickers U20s | Academy Contract | NA | |
| March 26, 2026 | MF | 9 | (United States) Jordan Bender | (Sweden) AFC Eskilstuna | signing | NA | |
| March 27, 2026 | DF | 22 | (Sweden) Hugo Bäckstrand | (Sweden) Malmö FF | signing | NA | |
| April 2, 2026 | DF | 5 | (Sweden) Amadeus Sögaard | (Sweden) IFK Norrköping | signing | NA | |
| May 8, 2026 | MF | 32 | (United States) Matt Bolduc | (United States) Richmond Kickers | 25 day Contract | NA | |
| June 12, 2026 | FW | 32 | (Argentina) Emiliano Terzaghi | (United States) Portland Hearts of Pine | Transfer | NA | |
| August 4, 2026 | MF | | (United States) Joshua Spengler | (United States) West Florida Flames | Academy Contract | NA | |
| August 4, 2026 | FW | | (United States) Lucas Fredericks | (United States) Miami Vipers | Academy Contract | NA | |
| August 4, 2026 | MF | | (United States) Eeli Elovaara | (United States) Sarasota Paraside U20s | Academy Contract | NA | |
| August 4, 2026 | DF | | (United States) Tristan Frederickson | (Germany) FC Bayern München Global Academy | Academy Contract | NA | |
| August 4, 2026 | FW | | (United States) Michael McGurk | (United States) Sarasota Paraside U20s | Academy Contract | NA | |

=== Out ===
| Date | Position | Number | Name | to | Type | Fee | Ref. |
|---|---|---|---|---|---|---|---|
| June 4, 2026 | MF | 32 | (United States) Matt Bolduc | (United States) Richmond Kickers | Contract Expired | NA | |
| September 8, 2026 | DF | 6 | (Puerto Rico) Callum Stretch | (United States) Las Vegas Lights FC | Transfer | Undisclosed | |

=== Loan in ===
| Date | Position | Number | Name | Previous club | From | To | Ref. |
|---|---|---|---|---|---|---|---|
| March 4, 2026 | GK | 13 | (Belarus) Stanislav Lapkes | (United States) Columbus Crew 2 | March 4, 2026 | May 8, 2026 | |
| August 24, 2026 | DF | | (Kenya) Kisa Kiingi | (United States) Colorado Springs Switchbacks | August 24, 2026 | End of Season | |

== Non-competitive fixtures ==
=== Pre-season ===
| January 17 | Sarasota Paradise | 0–6 | New England Revolution | Bradenton, Florida |
| 12:00 PM ET | | | Beason 16'; Campana 35'; Yueill 39'; Turgeman 65'; Oliveira 87'; Klein 90' | Stadium: IMG Academy |

| January 21 | Sarasota Paradise | 3–1 | New York Red Bulls | Bradenton, Florida |
| | Watters 13'; 31'; 69' | Report | Rojas 64' | Stadium: IMG Academy |

| January 25 | Florida Gulf Coast Eagles | 0–0 | Sarasota Paradise | Fort Myers, Florida |
| | | | | Stadium: FGCU Soccer Complex |

| February 7 | Sarasota Paradise | 1–2 | Rhode Island FC | Bradenton, Florida |
| | O'Dwyer | | Goal | Stadium: IMG Academy |

| February 13 | Sarasota Paradise | 2–1 | New York City FC II | Lakewood Ranch, Florida |
| 11:am ET | | | 85' | Stadium: Premier Sports Campus |

| February 21 | Tampa Bay Rowdies | 1–0 | Sarasota Paradise | St. Petersburg, Florida |
| | Dolabella 65' | Report | | Stadium: Al Lang Stadium |

| February 28 | Miami FC | v | Sarasota Paradise | Miami, Florida |
| | | | | Stadium: FIU Stadium |

=== Mid-season ===
| July 26 Snowbird Derby | Portland Hearts of Pine | 1–2 | Sarasota Paradise | Portland, Maine |
| | Wright 69' | | 19'; 71' | Stadium: Fitzpatrick Stadium; Attendance: 6,335 |

| July 29 Snowbird Derby | Sarasota Paradise | 2–2 | Portland Hearts of Pine | Lakewood Ranch, Florida |
| | | | | Stadium: Premier Sports Campus |

== Competitive fixtures ==
=== Regular Season ===
| March 7 1 | Sarasota Paradise | 0–1 | Athletic Club Boise | Lakewood Ranch, Florida |
| 7:30 PM EDT | Bolanos (yellow card) 20'; Watters (yellow card) 72' | Report | Dengler (yellow card) 35'; Kostyshyn 75' | Stadium: Premier Sports Campus; Attendance: 2,791; Referee: Matthew Thompson |

| March 14 2 | Sarasota Paradise | 2–2 | Fort Wayne FC | Lakewood Ranch, Florida |
| 7:30 PM EDT | Røed 45+1'; Stretch (yellow card) 49'; Bolanos 63' | Report | Ricol 30'; Becher 36' (yellow card) 90+3'; Musa (yellow card) 70' | Stadium: Premier Sports Campus; Attendance: 1,806; Referee: Calin Radosav |

| March 21 3 | South Georgia Tormenta FC | v | Sarasota Paradise | Statesboro, Georgia |
| | | | | Stadium: Tormenta Stadium |
Note: Game cancelled following South Georgia Tormenta FC's withdrawal from USL League One.

| March 28 4 | Sarasota Paradise | 1–0 | Portland Hearts of Pine | Lakewood Ranch, Florida |
| 7:30 PM EDT | Walker 8'; Karani (yellow card) 31'; Burlew (yellow card) 89'; Tainio (yellow card) 90' | Report | Armour (yellow card) 22'; Poon-Angeron (yellow card) 57' | Stadium: Premier Sports Campus; Attendance: 1,816; Referee: Carlos Rodriguez |

| April 4 5 | Sarasota Paradise | 1–2 | One Knoxville SC | Lakewood Ranch, Florida |
| 7:30 PM EDT | Watters (yellow card) 36'; Pettersen (yellow card) 45'; Rosa (yellow card) 61'; Bolanos 74'; Elovaara (yellow card) 81' | Report | Rodrigues (yellow card) 34' (goal) 55'; Fuller (yellow card) 45+3'; Diene 59' | Stadium: Premier Sports Campus; Attendance: 1,876; Referee: John Matto |

| April 8 6 | Westchester SC | 2–0 | Sarasota Paradise | Mount Vernon, New York |
| 7:00 PM ET | Guezen 53', 66'; Jennings (yellow card) 61' (yellow-red card) 61' | Report | Stretch (yellow card) 70' | Stadium: Stadium at Memorial Field; Attendance: 1,035; Referee: Rodrigo Albuquerque |

| April 11 7 | FC Naples | 2–0 | Sarasota Paradise | Naples, Florida |
| 7:00 PM ET | Bachstein (yellow card) 36'; Garcia 68', 90+7'; Torrellas (yellow card) 69'; Miglietti (yellow card) 80' | Report | Walker (yellow card) 33'; Rodriguez (yellow card) 89'; Bolanos (yellow card) 90+2'; Karani (yellow card) 90+4' | Stadium: Paradise Coast Sports Complex; Attendance: 2,864; Referee: Alexandra Billeter |

| April 22 8 | Sarasota Paradise | 2–1 | Corpus Christi FC | Lakewood Ranch, Florida |
| 6:30 PM EDT | Pettersen (yellow card) 35'; Rosa 42' (yellow card) 90+1'; Røed 64' | Report | Cerritos (yellow card) 25'; Kwakwa (yellow card) 45'; Roscoe (yellow card) 74'; Bowen 80'; Chaney (yellow card) 89' | Stadium: Premier Sports Campus; Attendance: 1,406; Referee: Richonne Clark |

| May 2 9 | Sarasota Paradise | 1–3 | Forward Madison FC | Lakewood Ranch, Florida |
| 7:30 PM ET | Bolanos 26'; Watters (yellow card) 68' | Report | Gebhard 24'; Edwards (yellow card) 58'; Humphrey 84'; Bolma 86' | Stadium: Premier Sports Campus; Attendance: 1,437; Referee: Elvis Osmanovic |

| May 9 10 | Chattanooga Red Wolves SC | 4–1 | Sarasota Paradise | East Ridge, Tennessee |
| 3:00 PM ET | Bentley 4', 54', 65'; Adewole 45+3'; Tapia (yellow card) 57' | Report | Cence 37' | Stadium: CHI Memorial Stadium; Attendance: 1,010; Referee: Luis Arroyo |

| May 16 11 | Sarasota Paradise | 1–2 | AV Alta FC | Lakewood Ranch, Florida |
| 6:30 PM EDT | Rosa 49'; Linderoth (yellow card) 53'; Watters (yellow card) 90+1' | Report | Desdunes 33'; Aoumaich 76' (pen.); Ibarra (yellow card) 90+3' | Stadium: Premier Sports Campus; Attendance: 1,658; Referee: Braeden Frey |

| May 24 12 | Spokane Velocity | 1–0 | Sarasota Paradise | Spokane, Washington |
| 7:00 PM ET | Margvelashvili (yellow card) 59'; Waldeck 72'; Lewis (yellow card) 81' | Report | McLaughlin (yellow card) 26'; Rodriguez (yellow card) 77' | Stadium: One Spokane Stadium; Attendance: 2,016; Referee: Felix Granados |

| May 27 13 | Athletic Club Boise | 0–2 | Sarasota Paradise | Garden City, Idaho |
| 9:00 PM ET | Amang (yellow card) 45' | Report | O'Dwyer 55'; McLaughlin 60'; Linderoth (yellow card) 81' | Stadium: Stadium at Expo Idaho; Attendance: 7,202; Referee: Steven Cardozo |

| May 30 14 | Sarasota Paradise | 2–1 | New York Cosmos | Lakewood Ranch, Florida |
| 7:30 PM EDT | Valentine (yellow card) 22'; Watters (yellow card) 62'; Bolduc 68'; Rosa 78'; Amedeka (yellow card) 84' | Report | Spengler (yellow card) 13' (goal) 50'; Galazzini (yellow card) 42'; Guenzatti (yellow card) 57'; Chavez (yellow card) 90' | Stadium: Premier Sports Campus; Attendance: 1,701; Referee: Richonne Clark |

| June 10 15 | AV Alta FC | 3–1 | Sarasota Paradise | Lancaster, California |
| 10:00 PM ET | Bahena Jr. 5'; C. Ortiz 18'; Aoumaich (yellow card) 62'; Antwi 77' | Report | Bender (yellow card) 72'; Watters (yellow card) 75'; Burlew 90+1' | Stadium: Lancaster Municipal Stadium; Attendance: 2,710; Referee: Kalilou Jarju |

| June 13 16 | Sarasota Paradise | 2–0 | Union Omaha | Lakewood Ranch, Florida |
| 7:30 PM EDT | Linderoth (yellow card) 21'; Terzaghi 55' (yellow card) 70'; Valentine (yellow card) 65'; Rosa 75' | Report | Ors (yellow card) 37'; Faz (yellow card) 77' | Stadium: Premier Sports Campus; Attendance: 1,571; Referee: Mario Maric |

| June 20 17 | Corpus Christi FC | 4–1 | Sarasota Paradise | Corpus Christi, Texas |
| 8:30 PM ET | Gomez (yellow card) 23'; Keegan 25', 33'; Keaney (yellow card) 37'; Kwakwa 62'; Cerritos (yellow card) 68'; Talbot (yellow card) 88'; Langlois (yellow card) 90+2'; Thomas 90+3' | Report | Walker (yellow card) 2' (goal) 53' (pen.); Rosa (yellow card) 84' | Stadium: Cabaniss Athletic Complex; Attendance: 1,937; Referee: John Matto |

| July 3 18 | Richmond Kickers | 0–0 | Sarasota Paradise | Richmond, Virginia |
| 7:30 PM ET | | Report | Bryant (yellow card) 60'; McLaughlin (yellow card) 81' | Stadium: City Stadium; Attendance: 3,132; Referee: Igor Bych |

| July 8 19 | Greenville Triumph SC | 0–0 | Sarasota Paradise | Mauldin, South Carolina |
| 7:00 PM ET | Robles (yellow card) 83'; Agyaakwah (yellow card) 85' | Report | Linderoth (yellow card) 53' | Stadium: GE Vernova Park; Attendance: 2,205; Referee: Muhammad Kaleia |

| August 1 20 | Sarasota Paradise | P–P | FC Naples | Lakewood Ranch, Florida |
| 7:30 PM EDT | | | | Stadium: Premier Sports Campus |
Note: match was postponed due to torrential rain.

| August 8 21 | One Knoxville SC | 2–1 | Sarasota Paradise | Knoxville, Tennessee |
| 7:00 PM ET | Conway 52'; Caputo (yellow card) 81'; Diene 90+5' | Report | Rosa (yellow card) 78'; Valentine 84' | Stadium: Covenant Health Park; Attendance: 4,369; Referee: Justin St. Pierre |

| August 15 22 | Charlotte Independence | 3–1 | Sarasota Paradise | Charlotte, North Carolina |
| 7:00 PM ET | Marou 2'; Bakero 8'; Jaime 14'; Coulibaly (yellow card) 50'; Dimick (yellow card) 77' | Report | Stretch (yellow card) 45'; Bolanos (yellow card) 45+4'; Burlew 82' (yellow card) 90'; Walker (yellow card) 90+3' (red card) 90+3' | Stadium: American Legion Memorial Stadium; Attendance: 821; Referee: Benjamin Meyer |

| August 19 23 | Sarasota Paradise | 3–2 | Chattanooga Red Wolves SC | Lakewood Ranch, Florida |
| 8:46 PM EDT | Rosa 18'; Terzaghi 42' (yellow card) 90+3'; Bolanos 45+2'; Karani (yellow card) 75' | Report | Hernandez 27' (pen.); Vaughan (yellow card) 79'; Mercer 90+5' | Stadium: Premier Sports Campus; Attendance: 1,469; Referee: Alejo Calume |

| August 22 24 | Union Omaha | 1–1 | Sarasota Paradise | Omaha, Nebraska |
| 7:00 PM ET | Vargas (yellow card) 29'; Kallman (yellow card) 45+6'; Boudadi (yellow card) 83'; Candela (yellow card) 90+1'; Botello Faz 90+4' (yellow card) 90+8'; Billhardt (yellow card) 90+6' | Report | Stretch 27'; Terzaghi (yellow card) 43'; Rodriguez (yellow card) 45+4'; Karani (yellow card) 90+2' | Stadium: Morrison Stadium; Attendance: 2,934; Referee: William Hale |

| August 29 25 | Sarasota Paradise | v | South Georgia Tormenta FC | Lakewood Ranch, Florida |
| | | | | Stadium: Premier Sports Campus |
Note: Game cancelled following South Georgia Tormenta FC's withdrawal from USL League One.

| September 2 26 | New York Cosmos | 1–2 | Sarasota Paradise | Paterson, New Jersey |
| 7:00 PM EDT | Chavez (yellow card) 39'; Garcia (yellow card) 73'; Jawneh 83'; Ljucovic (yellow card) 89' | Report | Walker (yellow card) 14'; Bolanos (yellow card) 33'; Krueger 51'; Rosa 77'; Bryant (yellow card) 90+6' | Stadium: Hinchliffe Stadium; Attendance: 1,505; Referee: Natalie Simon |

| September 5 27 | Sarasota Paradise | 1–1 | Spokane Velocity | Lakewood Ranch, Florida |
| 7:30 PM EDT | Bryant 21'; Rosa (yellow card) 45+5' | Report | John-Brown (yellow card) 45+6'; Hernández 90+4' | Stadium: Premier Sports Campus; Attendance: 1,558; Referee: John Tamayo |

| September 12 28 | Forward Madison FC | 1–1 | Sarasota Paradise | Madison, Wisconsin |
| 6:00 PM ET | Ngoubou 54'; Bolma (yellow card) 58'; Torres (yellow card) 64' | Report | Kiingi (yellow card) 18'; Krueger 39'; Bolanos (yellow card) 44'; Linderoth (yellow card) 90+3' | Stadium: Breese Stevens Field; Attendance: 4,012; Referee: Izlen Peksenar |

| September 19 29 | Sarasota Paradise | 6–0 | Greenville Triumph SC | Lakewood Ranch, Florida |
| 8:18 PM EDT | Rosa 4'; Krueger 13'; Gall 42'; Røed 45+3', 59'; Watters (yellow card) 52'; Bolanos 54' | Report | Benton (yellow card) 90+5' | Stadium: Premier Sports Campus; Attendance: 1,715; Referee: Russell Miller |
Note: match was delayed 48 minutes due to weather.

| September 26 30 | Portland Hearts of Pine | 1–4 | Sarasota Paradise | Portland, Maine |
| 5:00 PM ET | Faye (yellow card) 6' (yellow-red card) 90+1'; Kamara 19'; Rodríguez-Gentile (yellow card) 70'; Gonzalez (yellow card) 72'; Evans (yellow card) 90+3' | Report | Kiingi 4'; Røed 7', 42'; Gall (yellow card) 40' (goal) 51'; Rosa (yellow card) 49' | Stadium: Fitzpatrick Stadium; Attendance: 6,301; Referee: Elorm Atisu |

| October 3 31 | Sarasota Paradise | 2–3 | Charlotte Independence | Lakewood Ranch, Florida |
| 7:30 PM EDT | Røed 24' (yellow card) 42'; Bolanos 65'; Gall (yellow card) 74'; Linderoth (yellow card) 87' | Report | Romero (yellow card) 7'; Marou 17', 89'; Coulibaly (yellow card) 45+2'; Ortiz (yellow card) 78'; Pinho 90+4' (yellow card) 90+5'; Levy (yellow card) 90+8' | Stadium: Premier Sports Campus; Attendance: 1,491; Referee: John Matto |

| October 10 32 | Sarasota Paradise | 3–2 | Richmond Kickers | Lakewood Ranch, Florida |
| 7:30 PM EDT | Kiingi 36'; Gall 54'; Brulinski (yellow card) 73'; Terzaghi 85' (yellow card) 85' | Report | Dourado 23'; Amer 29'; Pannholzer (yellow card) 45+4'; Layton (yellow card) 64'; Vinberg (yellow card) 67'; Gallegos (yellow card) 78' | Stadium: Premier Sports Campus; Attendance: 1,448; Referee: Mario Maric |

| October 17 33 | Fort Wayne FC | 1–3 | Sarasota Paradise | Fort Wayne, Indiana |
| 7:30 PM EDT | Rempel 14' (yellow card) 85'; Jordan (yellow card) 27'; Armas (yellow card) 82'; Dias (yellow card) 90+8' | Report | Bolanos 25'; Sutton (yellow card) 27'; Rosa 45+1'; Terzaghi (yellow card) 87'; McLaughlin 90+7' | Stadium: Ruoff Mortgage Stadium; Attendance: 3,491; Referee: Eduardo Hernandez |

| October 21 20 | Sarasota Paradise | 2–3 | FC Naples | Lakewood Ranch, Florida |
| 6:30 PM EDT | Røed 35'; Linderoth (yellow card) 57'; Watters (yellow card) 87'; Bolanos 90+1'; Walker (red card) 90+4' | Report | Collins 39'; O'Connor 61'; Mastrantonio (yellow card) 73'; Ciss (yellow card) 78'; Miglietti (yellow card) 90+2'; Uderitz (yellow card) 90+3' (goal) 90+6' | Stadium: Premier Sports Campus; Attendance: 2,394; Referee: Jorge Escobar |
Note: match was originally going to be played on August 1 but was postponed due to bad weather.

| October 24 34 | Sarasota Paradise | 2–2 | Westchester SC | Lakewood Ranch, Florida |
| 7:30 PM EDT | Bolanos 61'; Terzaghi 67' (yellow card) 90+3'; McLaughlin (yellow card) 76'; Sanchez (yellow card) 86' | Report | Bouman (yellow card) 12'; Jiménez 83'; Armas (yellow card) 90+3'; Burko 90+7'; Powder (yellow card) 90+8' | Stadium: Premier Sports Campus; Attendance: 1,700; Referee: Atahan Yaya |

=== USL Cup ===
| April 25 Group Stage | Tampa Bay Rowdies | 2–0 | Sarasota Paradise | St. Petersburg, Florida |
| 7:30 PM ET | Dolabella (yellow card) 22'; Henderlong 31', 58'; Oliveira (yellow card) 53'; Hilton (yellow card) 85' | Report | Pettersen (yellow card) 26'; Sögaard (yellow card) 86' | Stadium: Al Lang Stadium; Attendance: 5,669; Referee: Stefan Perri |

| May 13 Group Stage | Sarasota Paradise | 0–2 | Sporting JAX | Lakewood Ranch, Florida |
| 7:30 PM ET | Bolanos (yellow card) 50'; Bryant (yellow card) 80'; Tainio (yellow card) 90+1' | Report | Pedder 34'; Dudley (yellow card) 45+1'; Neville (yellow card) 48'; Al Qaq 87' | Stadium: Premier Sports Campus; Attendance: 683; Referee: Erick Lezama |
Note: Game cancelled following South Georgia Tormenta FC's withdrawal from USL League One and rescheduled so Sporting JAX could play.

| June 6 Group Stage | FC Naples | 0–2 | Sarasota Paradise | Naples, Florida |
| 7:30 PM ET | Osorio (yellow card) 40'; Yoder (yellow card) 60'; Cisneros (yellow card) 77'; Bulai-Tudor (yellow card) 90+4' | Report | Watters 11'; Bäckstrand (yellow card) 43'; Kend (yellow card) 48'; O'Dwyer 84'; Krueger (yellow card) 85' | Stadium: Paradise Coast Sports Complex; Attendance: 2,139; Referee: Lauren Aldrich |

| July 11 Group Stage | Sarasota Paradise | 0–5 | Miami FC | Lakewood Ranch, Florida |
| 7:30 PM EDT | Valentine (yellow card) 16' | Report | Tunbridge 16' (pen.); Díaz 28'; Rocha 37'; Locadia 59'; Knutson 62'; Romero (yellow card) 88'; Tori (yellow card) 90+2' | Stadium: Premier Sports Campus; Attendance: 1,436; Referee: Atahan Yaya |

=== Appearances and goals ===
| No. | Pos | Nat | Player | Total | | USL League One | | USL Cup | | USL League One Playoffs | |
| No. | Pos | Nat | Player | Apps | Goals | Apps | Goals | Apps | Goals | Apps | Goals |
|---|---|---|---|---|---|---|---|---|---|---|---|
| 1 | GK | (United States) USA | Alex Sutton | 29 | 0 | 28+0 | 0 | 1+0 | 0 | 0+0 | 0 |
| 2 | DF | (United States) USA | Roberto Burlew | 14 | 2 | 6+5 | 2 | 3+0 | 0 | 0+0 | 0 |
| 3 | DF | (United States) USA | Reid Valentine | 33 | 1 | 13+17 | 1 | 3+0 | 0 | 0+0 | 0 |
| 4 | DF | (Republic of Ireland) IRL | Declan Watters | 35 | 1 | 30+1 | 0 | 4+0 | 1 | 0+0 | 0 |
| 5 | DF | (Sweden) SWE | Amadeus Sögaard Linderoth | 23 | 0 | 20+0 | 0 | 2+1 | 0 | 0+0 | 0 |
| 6 | DF | (Puerto Rico) PUR | Callum Stretch | 12 | 1 | 8+2 | 1 | 0+2 | 0 | 0+0 | 0 |
| 7 | MF | (United States) USA | Ethan Bryant | 36 | 1 | 22+10 | 1 | 4+0 | 0 | 0+0 | 0 |
| 8 | MF | (United States) USA | Aaron Walker | 30 | 2 | 25+4 | 2 | 1+0 | 0 | 0+0 | 0 |
| 9 | MF | (United States) USA | Jordan Bender | 12 | 0 | 2+7 | 0 | 1+2 | 0 | 0+0 | 0 |
| 10 | MF | (United States) USA | Matt Cence | 11 | 1 | 7+3 | 1 | 0+1 | 0 | 0+0 | 0 |
| 11 | FW | (United States) USA | Sean Karani | 20 | 0 | 9+9 | 0 | 1+1 | 0 | 0+0 | 0 |
| 13 | GK | (Belarus) BLR | Stanislav Lapkes | 0 | 0 | 0+0 | 0 | 0+0 | 0 | 0+0 | 0 |
| 14 | MF | (Norway) NOR | Jørgen Pettersen | 20 | 0 | 12+4 | 0 | 3+1 | 0 | 0+0 | 0 |
| 16 | MF | (United States) USA | Andres Rodriguez | 30 | 0 | 19+8 | 0 | 3+0 | 0 | 0+0 | 0 |
| 17 | MF | (United States) USA | Jonathan Bolanos | 34 | 9 | 31+1 | 9 | 1+1 | 0 | 0+0 | 0 |
| 18 | MF | (United States) USA | Brendan Krueger | 17 | 3 | 7+7 | 3 | 2+1 | 0 | 0+0 | 0 |
| 19 | FW | (United States) USA | Garrett McLaughlin | 30 | 1 | 14+13 | 1 | 3+0 | 0 | 0+0 | 0 |
| 20 | MF | (Finland) FIN | Maximus Tainio | 13 | 0 | 3+8 | 0 | 2+0 | 0 | 0+0 | 0 |
| 22 | DF | (Sweden) SWE | Hugo Bäckstrand | 3 | 0 | 0+1 | 0 | 1+1 | 0 | 0+0 | 0 |
| 23 | GK | (Ghana) GHA | Rockson Amedeka | 7 | 0 | 4+0 | 0 | 3+0 | 0 | 0+0 | 0 |
| 24 | MF | (United States) USA | Kisa Kiingi | 9 | 2 | 7+2 | 2 | 0+0 | 0 | 0+0 | 0 |
| 27 | MF | (England) ENG | Chandler O'Dwyer | 30 | 1 | 15+11 | 1 | 2+2 | 0 | 0+0 | 0 |
| 28 | MF | (United States) USA | Romain Gall | 9 | 3 | 6+3 | 3 | 0+0 | 0 | 0+0 | 0 |
| 32 | MF | (United States) USA | Matt Bolduc | 6 | 1 | 2+3 | 1 | 1+0 | 0 | 0+0 | 0 |
| 32 | FW | (Argentina) ARG | Emiliano Terzaghi | 19 | 4 | 7+11 | 4 | 0+1 | 0 | 0+0 | 0 |
| 36 | DF | (Brazil) BRA | Anderson Rosa | 33 | 8 | 32+0 | 8 | 1+0 | 0 | 0+0 | 0 |
| 46 | MF | (Norway) NOR | Sander Røed | 28 | 8 | 19+6 | 8 | 0+3 | 0 | 0+0 | 0 |
| 50 | FW | (United States) USA | Dominik Brulinski | 13 | 0 | 1+10 | 0 | 1+1 | 0 | 0+0 | 0 |
| 51 | DF | (United States) USA | Adam Kend | 2 | 0 | 0+0 | 0 | 1+1 | 0 | 0+0 | 0 |
| 52 | MF | (United States) USA | Kevin Sanchez | 3 | 0 | 1+1 | 0 | 0+1 | 0 | 0+0 | 0 |
| 53 | FW | (United States) USA | Eeli Elovaara | 1 | 0 | 0+1 | 0 | 0+0 | 0 | 0+0 | 0 |
| 54 | FW | (United States) USA | Lucas Fredericks | 1 | 0 | 0+1 | 0 | 0+0 | 0 | 0+0 | 0 |
| 60 | FW | (United States) USA | Michael McGurk | 1 | 0 | 0+1 | 0 | 0+0 | 0 | 0+0 | 0 |
| 61 | MF | (United States) USA | Joshua Spengler | 2 | 0 | 0+2 | 0 | 0+0 | 0 | 0+0 | 0 |

=== Top Goalscorers ===
| Rank | Position | Number | Name | USL1 Season | USL Cup | USL League One Playoffs | Total |
|---|---|---|---|---|---|---|---|
| 1 | MF | 17 | (United States) Jonathan Bolanos | 9 | 0 | 0 | 9 |
| 2 | DF | 36 | (Brazil) Anderson Rosa | 8 | 0 | 0 | 8 |
| 2 | MF | 46 | (Norway) Sander Roed | 8 | 0 | 0 | 8 |
| 4 | FW | 32 | (Argentina) Emiliano Terzaghi | 4 | 0 | 0 | 4 |
| 5 | MF | 10 | (United States) Brendan Krueger | 3 | 0 | 0 | 3 |
| 5 | MF | 28 | (United States) Romain Gall | 3 | 0 | 0 | 3 |
| 7 | DF | 2 | (United States) Roberto Burlew | 2 | 0 | 0 | 2 |
| 7 | MF | 8 | (United States) Aaron Walker | 2 | 0 | 0 | 2 |
| 7 | FW | 19 | (United States) Garrett McLaughlin | 2 | 0 | 0 | 2 |
| 7 | MF | 24 | (United States) Kisa Kiingi | 2 | 0 | 0 | 2 |
| 7 | MF | 27 | (England) Chandler O'Dwyer | 1 | 1 | 0 | 2 |
| 12 | DF | 3 | (United States) Reid Valentine | 1 | 0 | 0 | 1 |
| 12 | DF | 6 | (Puerto Rico) Callum Stretch | 1 | 0 | 0 | 1 |
| 12 | MF | 7 | (United States) Ethan Bryant | 1 | 0 | 0 | 1 |
| 12 | MF | 10 | (United States) Matthew Cence | 1 | 0 | 0 | 1 |
| 12 | MF | 32 | (United States) Matt Bolduc | 1 | 0 | 0 | 1 |
| 12 | DF | 4 | (Republic of Ireland) Declan Watters | 0 | 1 | 0 | 1 |
| Total | | | | 49 | 2 | 0 | 51 |

=== Assist scorers ===
| Rank | Position | Number | Name | USL1 Season | USL Cup | USL League One Playoffs | Total |
|---|---|---|---|---|---|---|---|
| 1 | DF | 36 | (Brazil) Anderson Rosa | 9 | 0 | 0 | 9 |
| 2 | MF | 46 | (Norway) Sander Roed | 6 | 0 | 0 | 6 |
| 3 | MF | 17 | (United States) Jonathan Bolanos | 5 | 0 | 0 | 5 |
| 4 | FW | 32 | (Argentina) Emiliano Terzaghi | 4 | 0 | 0 | 4 |
| 4 | MF | 7 | (United States) Ethan Bryant | 3 | 1 | 0 | 4 |
| 6 | MF | 16 | (United States) Andres Rodriguez | 2 | 1 | 0 | 3 |
| 7 | MF | 8 | (United States) Aaron Walker | 2 | 0 | 0 | 2 |
| 7 | FW | 19 | (United States) Garrett McLaughlin | 2 | 0 | 0 | 2 |
| 9 | MF | 14 | (Norway) Jørgen Pettersen | 1 | 0 | 0 | 1 |
| 9 | MF | 18 | (United States) Brendan Krueger | 1 | 0 | 0 | 1 |
| 9 | MF | 28 | (United States) Romain Gall | 1 | 0 | 0 | 1 |
| Total | | | | 36 | 2 | 0 | 38 |

=== Clean sheets ===
| Rank | Name | USL1 Season | USL Cup | Total |
|---|---|---|---|---|
| 1 | (United States) Alex Sutton | 2 | 0 | 2 |
| Total | | 2 | 0 | 2 |

=== Disciplinary record ===
| No. | Pos. | Player | USL League One Regular Season | | | USL Cup | | | USL League One Playoffs | | | Total | | |
| No. | Pos. | Player | Yellow card | (yellow card) (yellow-red card) | Red card | Yellow card | (yellow card) (yellow-red card) | Red card | Yellow card | (yellow card) (yellow-red card) | Red card | Yellow card | (yellow card) (yellow-red card) | Red card |
| 1 | GK | (United States) Alex Sutton | 1 | 0 | 0 | 0 | 0 | 0 | 0 | 0 | 0 | 1 | 0 | 0 |
| 2 | DF | (United States) Roberto Burlew | 2 | 0 | 0 | 0 | 0 | 0 | 0 | 0 | 0 | 2 | 0 | 0 |
| 3 | DF | (United States) Reid Valentine | 2 | 0 | 0 | 1 | 0 | 0 | 0 | 0 | 0 | 3 | 0 | 0 |
| 4 | DF | (Republic of Ireland) Declan Watters | 8 | 0 | 0 | 0 | 0 | 0 | 0 | 0 | 0 | 8 | 0 | 0 |
| 5 | DF | (Sweden) Amadeus Sögaard Linderoth | 7 | 0 | 0 | 1 | 0 | 0 | 0 | 0 | 0 | 8 | 0 | 0 |
| 6 | DF | (Puerto Rico) Callum Stretch | 3 | 0 | 0 | 0 | 0 | 0 | 0 | 0 | 0 | 3 | 0 | 0 |
| 7 | MF | (United States) Ethan Bryant | 2 | 0 | 0 | 1 | 0 | 0 | 0 | 0 | 0 | 3 | 0 | 0 |
| 8 | MF | (United States) Aaron Walker | 4 | 0 | 2 | 0 | 0 | 0 | 0 | 0 | 0 | 4 | 0 | 2 |
| 9 | MF | (United States) Jordan Bender | 1 | 0 | 0 | 0 | 0 | 0 | 0 | 0 | 0 | 1 | 0 | 0 |
| 10 | MF | (United States) Matt Cence | 0 | 0 | 0 | 0 | 0 | 0 | 0 | 0 | 0 | 0 | 0 | 0 |
| 11 | FW | (United States) Sean Karani | 4 | 0 | 0 | 0 | 0 | 0 | 0 | 0 | 0 | 4 | 0 | 0 |
| 13 | GK | (Belarus) Stanislav Lapkes | 0 | 0 | 0 | 0 | 0 | 0 | 0 | 0 | 0 | 0 | 0 | 0 |
| 14 | MF | (Norway) Jørgen Pettersen | 2 | 0 | 0 | 1 | 0 | 0 | 0 | 0 | 0 | 3 | 0 | 0 |
| 16 | MF | (United States) Andres Rodriguez | 3 | 0 | 0 | 0 | 0 | 0 | 0 | 0 | 0 | 3 | 0 | 0 |
| 17 | MF | (United States) Jonathan Bolanos | 5 | 0 | 0 | 1 | 0 | 0 | 0 | 0 | 0 | 6 | 0 | 0 |
| 18 | MF | (United States) Brendan Krueger | 0 | 0 | 0 | 1 | 0 | 0 | 0 | 0 | 0 | 1 | 0 | 0 |
| 19 | FW | (United States) Garrett McLaughlin | 3 | 0 | 0 | 0 | 0 | 0 | 0 | 0 | 0 | 3 | 0 | 0 |
| 20 | MF | (Finland) Maximus Tainio | 1 | 0 | 0 | 1 | 0 | 0 | 0 | 0 | 0 | 2 | 0 | 0 |
| 22 | DF | (Sweden) Hugo Bäckstrand | 0 | 0 | 0 | 1 | 0 | 0 | 0 | 0 | 0 | 1 | 0 | 0 |
| 23 | GK | (Ghana) Rockson Amedeka | 1 | 0 | 0 | 0 | 0 | 0 | 0 | 0 | 0 | 1 | 0 | 0 |
| 24 | MF | (United States) Kisa Kiingi | 1 | 0 | 0 | 0 | 0 | 0 | 0 | 0 | 0 | 1 | 0 | 0 |
| 27 | MF | (England) Chandler O'Dwyer | 0 | 0 | 0 | 0 | 0 | 0 | 0 | 0 | 0 | 0 | 0 | 0 |
| 28 | MF | (United States) Romain Gall | 2 | 0 | 0 | 0 | 0 | 0 | 0 | 0 | 0 | 2 | 0 | 0 |
| 32 | MF | (United States) Matt Bolduc | 0 | 0 | 0 | 0 | 0 | 0 | 0 | 0 | 0 | 0 | 0 | 0 |
| 32 | FW | (Argentina) Emiliano Terzaghi | 6 | 0 | 0 | 0 | 0 | 0 | 0 | 0 | 0 | 6 | 0 | 0 |
| 36 | DF | (Brazil) Anderson Rosa | 6 | 0 | 0 | 0 | 0 | 0 | 0 | 0 | 0 | 6 | 0 | 0 |
| 46 | MF | (Norway) Sander Roed | 1 | 0 | 0 | 0 | 0 | 0 | 0 | 0 | 0 | 1 | 0 | 0 |
| 50 | FW | (United States) Dominik Brulinski | 1 | 0 | 0 | 0 | 0 | 0 | 0 | 0 | 0 | 1 | 0 | 0 |
| 51 | DF | (United States) Adam Kend | 0 | 0 | 0 | 1 | 0 | 0 | 0 | 0 | 0 | 1 | 0 | 0 |
| 52 | MF | (United States) Kevin Sanchez | 1 | 0 | 0 | 0 | 0 | 0 | 0 | 0 | 0 | 1 | 0 | 0 |
| | Head Coach | (Finland) Mika Elovaara | 1 | 0 | 0 | 0 | 0 | 0 | 0 | 0 | 0 | 1 | 0 | 0 |
| Total | | | 68 | 0 | 2 | 9 | 0 | 0 | 0 | 0 | 0 | 77 | 0 | 2 |

== Honors and awards ==
=== USL League One Annual Awards ===
==== USL League One All League Honorees ====
| Player | Team | Position | Ref |
|---|---|---|---|
| (Brazil) Anderson Rosa | Second | DF | |

=== Midseason Awards ===
| Award | Player | Ref |
|---|---|---|
| Defender of the Year | (Brazil) Anderson Rosa | |

=== Weekly Awards ===
==== USL League One Team of the Week ====
| Week | Player | Opponent | Position | Ref |
|---|---|---|---|---|
| 2 | (Norway) Sander Røed | Fort Wayne FC | MF | |
| 2 | (United States) Jonathan Bolanos | Fort Wayne FC | Bench | |
| 4 | (United States) Aaron Walker | Portland Hearts of Pine | MF | |
| 4 | (United States) Jonathan Bolanos | One Knoxville SC | MF | |
| 8/9 | (Norway) Sander Røed | Corpus Christi FC | MF | |
| 11/12 | (Brazil) Anderson Rosa | AV Alta FC and Spokane Velocity | DF | |
| 13 | (United States) Alex Sutton | Athletic Club Boise | Goalkeeper | |
| 13 | (Brazil) Anderson Rosa | New York Cosmos | Defender | |
| 13 | (Finland) Mika Elovaara | Athletic Club Boise and New York Cosmos | Head Coach | |
| 14/15 | (Brazil) Anderson Rosa | AV Alta FC and Union Omaha | DF | |
| 14/15 | (Argentina) Emiliano Terzaghi | Union Omaha | Bench | |
| 25 | (Brazil) Anderson Rosa | Chattanooga Red Wolves SC | DF | |
| 25 | (Argentina) Emiliano Terzaghi | Chattanooga Red Wolves SC | FW | |
| 25 | (Puerto Rico) Callum Stretch | Union Omaha | Bench | |
| 25 | (United States) Jonathan Bolanos | Chattanooga Red Wolves SC | Bench | |
| 27 | (United States) Alex Sutton | New York Cosmos and Spokane Velocity | GK | |
| 27 | (Brazil) Anderson Rosa | New York Cosmos and Spokane Velocity | DF | |
| 28 | (United States) Brendan Krueger | Forward Madison FC | Bench | |
| 29 | (Brazil) Anderson Rosa | Greenville Triumph SC | DF | |
| 29 | (United States) Jonathan Bolanos | Greenville Triumph SC | MF | |
| 29 | (Norway) Sander Røed | Greenville Triumph SC | FW | |
| 29 | (United States) Alex Sutton | Greenville Triumph SC | Bench | |
| 29 | (United States) Kisa Kiingi | Greenville Triumph SC | Bench | |
| 29 | (United States) Brendan Krueger | Greenville Triumph SC | Bench | |
| 30 | (Brazil) Anderson Rosa | Portland Hearts of Pine | DF | |
| 30 | (United States) Jonathan Bolanos | Portland Hearts of Pine | MF | |
| 30 | (Norway) Sander Røed | Portland Hearts of Pine | FW | |
| 30 | (Finland) Mika Elovaara | Portland Hearts of Pine | Head Coach | |
| 32 | (United States) Kisa Kiingi | Richmond Kickers | Bench | |
| 33 | (Brazil) Anderson Rosa | Fort Wayne FC | DF | |

==== USL League One Goal of the Week ====
| Week | Player | Opponent | Ref |
|---|---|---|---|
| 11/12 | (Brazil) Anderson Rosa | AV Alta FC | |
| 13 | (Brazil) Anderson Rosa | New York Cosmos | |

==== USL League One Player of the Week ====
| Week | Player | Opponent | Position | Ref |
|---|---|---|---|---|
| 25 | (Brazil) Anderson Rosa | Chattanooga Red Wolves SC and Union Omaha | DF | |

=== USL Cup Awards ===
==== Prinx Tires USL Cup Team of the Round ====
| Week | Player | Opponent | Position | Ref |
|---|---|---|---|---|
| 1 | (United States) Alex Sutton | Tampa Bay Rowdies | Bench | |
| 3 | (Ghana) Rockson Amedeka | FC Naples | GK | |
| 3 | (Republic of Ireland) Declan Watters | FC Naples | DF | |
