= 2025 Monterey Bay FC season =

Monterey Bay FC
2025 season
- Owners: Ray Beshoff
- Manager: Jordan Stewart
- Stadium: Cardinale Stadium
- USL Championship: Western Conference: 11th Overall: 23rd
- USLC playoffs: DNQ
- U.S. Open Cup: Second Round
- USL Cup: Group stage
Home colours	Away colours

The 2025 Monterey Bay FC season was the club's fourth season since their establishment on February 1, 2021.

== Season squad ==
Squad No.	Name	Nationality	Position(s)	Date of birth (age)
Goalkeepers
1	Nico Campuzano	(Spain)	GK	January 29, 1998 (age 28)
18	Sam Gomez	(United States)	GK	December 26, 1999 (age 26)
25	Dallas Odle	(United States)	GK	August 5, 2001 (age 24)
Defenders
2	Nico Gordon	(Montserrat)	DF	April 28, 2002 (age 23)
3	Jacob Muir	(Australia)	DF	May 3, 2002 (age 23)
4	Alex Lara	(United States)	DF	September 15, 1998 (age 27)
5	Carlos Guzmán	(Mexico)	DF	May 19, 1994 (age 31)
12	Grant Robinson	(United States)	DF	August 15, 1998 (age 27)
15	Miles Lyons	(United States)	DF	October 8, 2002 (age 23)
22	Joel Garcia Jr.	(United States)	DF	April 26, 2002 (age 23)
Midfielders
6	Wesley Fonguck	(England)	MF	July 16, 1997 (age 28)
7	Adrian Rebollar	(United States)	MF	November 12, 1999 (age 26)
8	Ethan Bryant	(United States)	MF	August 20, 2002 (age 23)
13	Mobi Fehr	(United States)	MF	December 13, 1994 (age 31)
14	Pierce Gallaway	(United States)	MF	August 23, 2001 (age 24)
88	Xavi Gnaulati	(United States)	MF	January 22, 2005 (age 21)
Forwards
9	Adam Larsson	(Sweden)	FW	September 5, 1999 (age 26)
10	Alex Dixon	(United States)	FW	February 7, 1990 (age 36)
11	Mayele Malango	(Malawi)	FW	February 25, 1997 (age 28)
16	Diego Gutiérrez	(United States)	FW	January 5, 1999 (age 27)
17	Luther Archimède	(Guadeloupe)	FW	September 17, 1999 (age 26)
20	Paul Gindiri	(United States)	FW	July 26, 2002 (age 23)
22	Anton Søjberg	(Denmark)	FW	December 21, 2000 (age 25)
31	Luke Ivanovic	(Australia)	FW	June 6, 2000 (age 25)

Last updated: March 30, 2025.
Source: Monterey Bay F.C., USL Championship

== Competitions ==
=== USL Championship ===
==== Western Conference ====
Pos	Team	Pld	W	L	T	GF	GA	GD	Pts	Qualification
8	Colorado Springs Switchbacks FC	30	10	13	7	35	47	−12	37	Playoffs
9	Lexington SC	30	9	12	9	31	42	−11	36	
10	Oakland Roots SC	30	8	14	8	42	52	−10	32	
11	Monterey Bay FC	30	7	15	8	27	45	−18	29	
12	Las Vegas Lights FC	30	6	15	9	23	50	−27	27	

Source: USL Championship Standings
Rules for classification: 1) head-to-head points; 2) head-to-head goal differential; 3) points-per-game within conference; 4) total wins; 5) total goal differential; 6) total goals scored; 7) points earned against top four Conference finishers; 8) disciplinary points; 9) coin toss or drawing of lots

==== Matches ====
On December 19, 2024, the USL Championship released the regular season schedule for all 24 teams.

All times are in Pacific Standard Time.

March 8, 2025 1	San Antonio FC	1–0	Monterey Bay FC	San Antonio, Texas
5:30 PM	Medranda (yellow card); Pacheco 40'; Taintor (yellow card) 42'; Hernandez (yellow card) 85'	Report	Gnaulati (yellow card) 26'; Lyons (yellow card) 74'	Stadium: Toyota Field; Attendance: 8,164; Referee: Matthew Thompson

March 15, 2025 2	Monterey Bay FC	3–2	Oakland Roots SC	Seaside, California
7:00 PM		Report		Stadium: Cardinale Stadium; Attendance: 5,160; Referee: Elijio Arreguin

March 22, 2025 3	Orange County SC	0–3	Monterey Bay FC	Irvine, California
5:30 PM		Report		Stadium: Championship Soccer Stadium; Attendance: 3,020; Referee: Corbyn May

March 29, 2025 4	Monterey Bay FC	3–1	Phoenix Rising FC	Seaside, California
7:00 PM	Guzmán 3'; Rebollar 64'; Søjberg 73', (yellow card) 55'; Lyons (yellow card) 15'; Gnaulati (yellow card) 40'	Report	Cabral 17'; Okello (yellow card) 2'; Margaritha (yellow card) 21'; Boye (yellow card) 26' (yellow-red card) 62'; Neville (yellow card) 43'; Sainté (red card); Ping (yellow card) 89'	Stadium: Cardinale Stadium; Attendance: 3,210; Referee: Brandon Stevis

April 5, 2025 5	Detroit City FC	0−0	Monterey Bay FC	Hamtramck, Michigan
1:00 PM	Smith (yellow card) 56'; Villanueva (yellow card) 76'; Rutz (yellow card) 90+1'	Report	Malango (yellow card) 34'; Gordon (yellow card) 72'; Garcia Jr. (yellow card) 90+1'	Stadium: Keyworth Stadium; Attendance: 5,047; Referee: Gerald Flores

April 12, 2025 6	Monterey Bay FC	2−1	Colorado Springs Switchbacks FC	Seaside, California
7:00 PM		Report		Stadium: Cardinale Stadium; Attendance: 3,309; Referee: Elvis Osmanovic

April 19, 2025 7	Lexington SC	0−0	Monterey Bay FC	Lexington, Kentucky
4:00 PM		Report		Stadium: Lexington SC Stadium; Attendance: 3,102; Referee: Thomas Snyder

April 23, 2025 8	New Mexico United	1−0	Monterey Bay FC	Albuquerque, New Mexico
6:00 PM	Seymore (yellow card) 26'; Jabang 29'	Report	Lara (yellow card) 90+3'	Stadium: Isotopes Park; Attendance: 6,713; Referee: Greg Dopka

May 4, 2025 9	Monterey Bay FC	1–1	Miami FC	Seaside, California
4:00 pm PDT	Paul 9' (yellow card) 17'; Guzmán (yellow card) 60'	Report	Zárate (yellow card) 19'; Ricketts (yellow card) 50'; Bonfiglio 87'; Rivera (yellow card) 90+5'	Stadium: Cardinale Stadium; Attendance: 4,179; Referee: Brad Jensen

May 10, 2025 10	Rhode Island FC	1–1	Monterey Bay FC	Pawtucket, RI
7:00 PM	Brito 77'; Sanchez (yellow card) 82'	Report	Malango 17'; Ivanovic (yellow card) 25'; Bryant (yellow card) 35'; Lara (yellow card) 55'	Stadium: Centreville Bank Stadium; Attendance: 7,474; Referee: John Griggs

May 17, 2025 11	Phoenix Rising FC	2−0	Monterey Bay FC	Phoenix, Arizona
7:00 PM	Scearce 65'; Flood 88'	Report		Stadium: Phoenix Rising Soccer Stadium; Attendance: 4,037; Referee: Trevor Wiseman

May 24, 2025 12	Monterey Bay FC	0–2	Louisville City FC	Seaside, California
7:00 PM		Report	Totsch 20'; Perez 49'	Stadium: Cardinale Stadium; Attendance: 3,002; Referee: Alyssa Nichols

June 7, 2025 13	Monterey Bay FC	2−1	Lexington SC	Seaside, California
7:00 PM	Larsson 20'; Søjberg 75' (pen.)	Report	Firmino 7' (pen.)	Stadium: Cardinale Stadium; Attendance: 2,420; Referee: Mark Verso

June 14, 2025 14	Las Vegas Lights FC	2–0	Monterey Bay FC	Las Vegas, Nevada
7:30 PM	Rodriguez 60', 65'	Report		Stadium: Cashman Field; Attendance: 2,632; Referee: Cristian Campo Hernández

June 21, 2025 15	Monterey Bay FC	1−2	El Paso Locomotive	Seaside, California
7:00 PM	Ivanovic 60'	Report	Ackwei 15'; Cabrera 56' (pen.)	Stadium: Cardinale Stadium; Attendance: 3,257; Referee: Rodrigo Albuquerque

July 5, 2025 16	Indy Eleven	3–0	Monterey Bay FC	Indianapolis, Indiana
4:30 PM	Quinn 8'; Blake 45+11' (pen.); Williams 83'	Report		Stadium: Michael A. Carroll Stadium; Attendance: 9,169; Referee: Natalie Simon

July 12, 2025 17	Monterey Bay FC	2-1	Orange County SC	Seaside, California
	Ivanovic 39'; Søjberg 54'	Report	Benalcazar 51'; Kelly (red card) 69'	Stadium: Cardinale Stadium; Attendance: 3,080; Referee: Brad Jensen

July 16, 2025 18	FC Tulsa	2-1	Monterey Bay FC	Tulsa, Oklahoma
7:30 PM	Diallo 47'; Lukic 48'	Report	Malango 9'	Stadium: ONEOK Field; Attendance: 3,745; Referee: Edson Carvajal

August 6, 2025 19	Monterey Bay FC	2–3	FC Tulsa	Seaside, California
7:00 PM	Klein 51'; Ivanovic 59'	Report	Dalou 12'; Lukic 71'; Rogers 86' (pen.)	Stadium: Cardinale Stadium; Attendance: 2,722; Referee: Muhammad Hassan

August 9, 2025 20	Sacramento Republic FC	1–0	Monterey Bay FC	Sacramento, California
8:00 PM	López 36'	Report		Stadium: Heart Health Park; Attendance: 8,563; Referee: Elvis Osmanovic

August 16, 2025 21	El Paso Locomotive FC	2−2	Monterey Bay FC	El Paso, Texas
6:00 PM	Sorto 23', 59'	Report	Rebollar 21'; Søjberg 90'+4'	Stadium: Southwest University Park; Attendance: 4,564; Referee: Nabil Bensalah

August 23, 2025 22	Monterey Bay FC	0–0	San Antonio FC	Seaside, California
7:00 PM		Report	Berrón (yellow card) 27' (yellow-red card) 86'	Stadium: Cardinale Stadium; Attendance: 4,266; Referee: Elijio Arreguin

August 30, 2025 23	Oakland Roots SC	1–0	Monterey Bay FC	Oakland, California
7:00 PM	Doner 32'	Report		Stadium: Oakland Coliseum; Attendance: 9,871; Referee: Thomas Snyder

September 6, 2025 24	Colorado Springs Switchbacks FC	2–1	Monterey Bay FC	Colorado Springs, Colorado
6:00 PM	Real (yellow card) 36'; Clegg 56'; Vassell 63'	Report	Gnaulati (yellow card) 20'; Scott 40'; Robinson (yellow card) 45+1'; Klein (yellow card) 49'; Rebolarr (yellow card) 67'	Stadium: Weidner Field; Attendance: 7,244; Referee: Elton García

September 13, 2025 25	Monterey Bay FC	0–4	Hartford Athletic	Seaside, California
7:00 PM		Report	Panayotou 24'; Edwards 85', 90'+2'; Anderson 90'+4'	Stadium: Cardinale Stadium; Attendance: 3,132; Referee: Ekaterina Koroleva

September 20, 2025 26	Monterey Bay FC	1–1	New Mexico United	Seaside, California
7:00 PM	Gnaulati 48'	Report	Archimede 87'	Stadium: Cardinale Stadium; Attendance: 3,299; Referee: Matthew Corrigan

September 27, 2025 27	Monterey Bay FC	1–0	Sacramento Republic FC	Seaside, California
7:00 PM	Rebollar 71'	Report		Stadium: Cardinale Stadium; Attendance: 2,747; Referee: Corbyn May

October 4, 2025 28	Tampa Bay Rowdies	4–0	Monterey Bay FC	St. Petersburg, Florida
4:30 PM	Pacius 35', 73'; Crisostomo 62'; Arteaga 88'	Report		Stadium: Al Lang Stadium; Attendance: 4,778; Referee: Brandon Stevis

October 18, 2025 29	Monterey Bay FC	0–3	Pittsburgh Riverhounds SC	Seaside, California
7:00 PM		Report	Suber 27'; Williams 73'; Wälti 86'	Stadium: Cardinale Stadium; Attendance: 2,707; Referee: Gerald Flores

October 25, 2025 30	Monterey Bay FC	1–1	Las Vegas Lights FC	Seaside, California
7:00 PM	Malango 28'	Report	Leal 3'	Stadium: Cardinale Stadium; Attendance: 3,608; Referee: Robert Vincze

=== USL Cup ===
Monterey Bay participated in the second edition of the USL Cup, the first edition to feature teams from both the USL Championship and League One.

==== Standings ====
Pos	Lg	Team	Pld	W	PKW	PKL	L	GF	GA	GD	Pts	Qualification
1	USLC	Sacramento Republic FC	4	3	0	0	1	6	1	+5	9	Advance to knockout stage
2	USLC	Las Vegas Lights FC	4	3	0	0	1	7	6	+1	9	
3	USLC	Monterey Bay FC	4	2	0	0	2	6	6	0	6	
4	USLC	Orange County SC	4	2	0	0	2	5	6	−1	6	
5	USL1	AV Alta FC	4	1	1	0	2	5	6	−1	5	

Updated to match(es) played on July 26, 2025. Source: USL

==== Group stage ====
May 28, 2025	Monterey Bay FC	1–0	Spokane Velocity FC	Seaside, California
7:00 PM PDT	Gallaway 4'	Report		Stadium: Cardinale Stadium; Attendance: 2,014; Referee: Brandon Stevis

May 31, 2025	Monterey Bay FC	3–2	Orange County SC	Seaside, California
7:00 PM PDT	Paul 36', 67'; Larsson 85'	Report	Pedro Guimaraes 27'; Dunbar 90+3'	Stadium: Cardinale Stadium; Attendance: 3,006; Referee: Calin Radosav

June 28, 2025	Oakland Roots SC	2–1	Monterey Bay FC	Oakland, California
7:00 PM PDT	Muir 17' (o.g.); Doner 58'	Report	Ivanovic 86'	Stadium: Oakland Coliseum; Attendance: 4,957; Referee: Matthew Corrigan

July 26, 2025	AV Alta FC	2–1	Monterey Bay FC	Lancaster, California
8:00 PM PDT	Lay 9'; Aoumaich 73'	Report	Gnaulati 8'	Stadium: Lancaster Municipal Stadium; Attendance: 4,408; Referee: Muhammad Kaleia

=== U.S. Open Cup ===
Monterey Bay played in the 110th edition of the U.S. Open Cup. Entering the tournament in the first round alongside half the teams in the USL Championship, the club was drawn as hosts against amateur club International San Francisco of the San Francisco Soccer Football League. After thrashing the visitors 4–0, the club played again at home against perennially participating amateur club El Farolito SC of the National Premier Soccer League, losing in an upset 2–1.

March 19 First Round	Monterey Bay FC (USLC) (California)	4–0	(California) International San Francisco (SFSFL)	Seaside, California
7:00 PM PDT	Fehr 2'; Gnaulati 26', 45+2'; Paul 84'	Report		Stadium: Cardinale Stadium; Attendance: 968; Referee: Robert Vincze

April 1 Second Round	Monterey Bay FC (USLC) (California)	1−2	(California) El Farolito SC (NPSL)	Seaside, California
7:00 PM PDT		Report		Stadium: Cardinale Stadium; Attendance: 688; Referee: Esad Omanovic
