= Andrés Rodríguez =

Andrés Rodríguez may refer to:

- Andrés Rodríguez (politician) (1923–1997), president of Paraguay
- Andrés Rodríguez (basketball) (born 1981), basketball player from Puerto Rico
- Andrés Rodríguez (footballer) (born 2002), Spanish footballer
- Andres Rodriguez (show jumper) (1984–2016), Venezuelan showjumper
- Andrés Rodríguez (sprinter) (born 1985), Panamanian sprinter
- Andrés Rodríguez Vila (born 1973), Uruguayan chess player
- Andrés Rodríguez Erben, Anglican bishop of Paraguay
- Andrés Rodríguez de Villegas, Spanish soldier and governor

== See also ==
- Andrés Rodríguez-Pose, professor of economic geography
