= Nico Campuzano =

Spanish footballer (born 1998)

Personal information
- Full name: Nicolás Campuzano Jiménez
- Date of birth: 29 January 1998 (age 28)
- Place of birth: Los Corrales de Buelna, Spain
- Height: 1.88 m (6 ft 2 in)
- Position: Goalkeeper

Team information
- Current team: Pittsburgh Riverhounds
- Number: 1

Youth career
- 2006–2007: AD Delasalle
- 2007–2008: Clube Bansander
- 2008–2013: Racing de Santander
- 2013–2014: Real Valladolid
- 2014–2016: Barcelona
- 2016–2017: Villarreal

College career
Years	Team	Apps	(Gls)
2018–2019	Portland Pilots	15	(0)
2020–2021	Pittsburgh Panthers	40	(0)

Senior career*
Years	Team	Apps	(Gls)
2017–2018	Las Palmas C		
2019	Seattle Sounders FC U-23	10	(0)
2021	Manhattan SC	4	(0)
2022	FC Cincinnati 2	4	(0)
2023	New England Revolution II	11	(0)
2023	→ New England Revolution (loan)	0	(0)
2024	Lexington SC	7	(0)
2025	Monterey Bay FC	28	(0)
2026–	Pittsburgh Riverhounds	29	(0)
- * Club domestic league appearances and goals as of 13:58, 8 November 2026 (UTC)

Nicolás Campuzano Jiménez (born 29 January 1998) is a Spanish professional footballer who plays as a goalkeeper for USL Championship side Pittsburgh Riverhounds.

== Early life ==
Campuzano began playing youth football with AD Delasalle in his hometown of Los Corrales de Buelna. Afterwards, he joined Club Basander, where he played for a season.

He then joined Racing de Santander, where he played for five years. He then joined Real Valladolid, while also playing with the Castilla y León U-16 team.

In July 2014, he joined the FC Barcelona youth system on a three-year contract. In February 2016, there were strong attempts by Roma to sign him, but they were rejected by Barcalona. In July 2016, he joined the Villarreal youth system.

== College career ==
In April 2018, he committed to attend the University of Portland in the fall, where he would play for the men's soccer team. After only making two appearances in his freshman season, he became the starter in his sophomore season. In 2019, he was named to the West Coast Conference Men's Soccer All-Academic Team.

In 2020, he began attending the University of Pittsburgh, as a graduate student, playing for the men's soccer team. In September 2020, he was named to the TopDrawerSoccer Team of the Week and in May 2021, was named the Pittsburgh Student-Athlete of the Week. At the end of his first season with Pittsburgh, he set single season records for wins and minutes played and was named to the All-ACC Academic Team, the South All-Region First Team, All-ACC First Team, and the All-ACC Tournament Team. In his second season with Pittsburgh, he was named to the All-ACC Academic Team, he received All-ACC Third Team and All-ACC Academic Team honors and was named a Senior CLASS Award candidate.

== Club career ==
In September 2017, he joined UD Las Palmas, signing a one-year contract, with an option for an additional four years. On 14 October 2017, he made his senior debut with UD Las Palmas C in the fourth tier Tercera División.

In 2019, he played with the Seattle Sounders FC U-23 in USL League Two.

In 2021, he played with Manhattan SC in USL League Two.

In March 2022, he signed a professional contract with FC Cincinnati 2 in MLS Next Pro. He made 4 appearances for the team in 2022, recording 14 saves.

In December 2022, he signed with New England Revolution II in MLS Next Pro, ahead of the 2023 season. In March 2023, he joined the New England Revolution first team on a short-term loan deal. On June 23, 2023, he was substituted into a match against Toronto FC II as a forward after an injury, with the team out of remaining outfield player substitutes.

In January 2024, Campuzano joined USL League One club Lexington SC.

In February 2025, he signed with USL Championship side Monterey Bay FC.

In January 2026, Campuzano and Monterey Bay mutually agreed to part ways. Campuzano would then join fellow USL Championship club Pittsburgh Riverhounds SC.

== Personal life ==
Campuzano obtained American citizenship after attending college and marrying an American citizen.

== Career statistics ==
As of match played October 30, 2026

Club	Season	League			Playoffs		National Cup		Other		Total	
Club	Season	Division	Apps	Goals	Apps	Goals	Apps	Goals	Apps	Goals	Apps	Goals
Seattle Sounders FC U-23	2019	USL League Two	10	0	—		—		—		10	0
Manhattan SC	2021	USL League Two	4	0	—		—		—		4	0
FC Cincinnati 2	2022	MLS Next Pro	4	0	–		—		—		4	0
New England Revolution II	2023	MLS Next Pro	11	0	1	0	—		—		12	0
New England Revolution (loan)	2023	Major League Soccer	0	0	0	0	0	0	0	0	0	0
Lexington SC	2024	USL League One	1	0	—		1	0	0	0	2	0
Monterey Bay FC	2025	USL Championship	28	0	—		—		—		28	0
Pittsburgh Riverhounds SC	2026	USL Championship	29	0	1	0	3	0	—		33	0
Career total			87	0	2	0	4	0	0	0	93	0
