= Maximus Tainio =

Finnish footballer (born 2001)

Maximus Mikael Tainio
Personal information
- Date of birth: 24 May 2001 (age 25)
- Place of birth: Auxerre, France
- Height: 1.78 m (5 ft 10 in)
- Position: Midfielder

Youth career
- 2010: AFC
- –2017: HJK Helsinki
- 2017–2020: Tottenham Hotspur

Senior career*
Years	Team	Apps	(Gls)
2020–2021	Haka	38	(2)
2020	→ AC Kajaani (loan)	2	(0)
2022	HIFK	15	(1)
2023	AC Oulu	18	(0)
2024	SalPa	24	(3)
2025	Jippo	24	(3)
2026	Sarasota Paradise	11	(0)

International career
2016–2017	Finland U16	4	(0)
2017–2018	Finland U17	8	(0)
2018	Finland U18	1	(0)
2018–2019	Finland U19	5	(0)
- * Club domestic league appearances and goals as of 13:34, 2 November 2026 (UTC)

Maximus Mikael Tainio (born 24 May 2001) is a Finnish professional footballer who plays as a midfielder. He recently played for Sarasota Paradise in USL League One. He is the son of former footballer Teemu Tainio.

== Club career ==
Tainio signed to Tottenham on a two-year deal in January 2017. Spurs released the player near the end of July 2020. Tainio joined up with his father at Veikkausliiga club FC Haka. On 29 July 2020, he was sent on a short-term loan to AC Kajaani. He played two games in August 2020 in the Ykkönen, the second level of Finnish football, before returning to Haka the same month.

On 4 January 2022, he joined HIFK on a one-year deal.

== International career ==
Tainio has represented Finland at under-17 level.

== Career statistics ==
=== Club ===
As of matches played on 14 March 2026

Club	Season	League			Cup (Note: Appearance(s) in Finnish Cup and U.S. Open Cup)		Continental		Other		Total	
Club	Season	Division	Apps	Goals	Apps	Goals	Apps	Goals	Apps	Goals	Apps	Goals
Haka	2020	Veikkausliiga	14	0	0	0	—		—		14	0
Haka	2021	Veikkausliiga	24	2	3	1	—		—		27	3
Haka	Total		38	2	3	1	0	0	0	0	41	3
AC Kajaani (loan)	2020	Ykkönen	2	0	—		—		—		2	0
HIFK	2022	Veikkausliiga	15	1	4	1	—		1 (Note: Includes Finnish League Cup)	0	20	2
AC Oulu	2023	Veikkausliiga	18	0	4	0	—		6	0	28	0
SalPa	2024	Ykkösliiga	24	3	1	0	—		2 (Note: Includes Ykkösliigacup)	0	27	3
Jippo	2025	Ykkösliiga	24	3	1	0	—		—		25	3
Sarasota Paradise	2026	USL League One	2	0	0	0	—		0	0	2	0
Career total			123	9	13	2	0	0	9	0	145	11
