= Callum Stretch =

Puerto Rican footballer (born 1999)

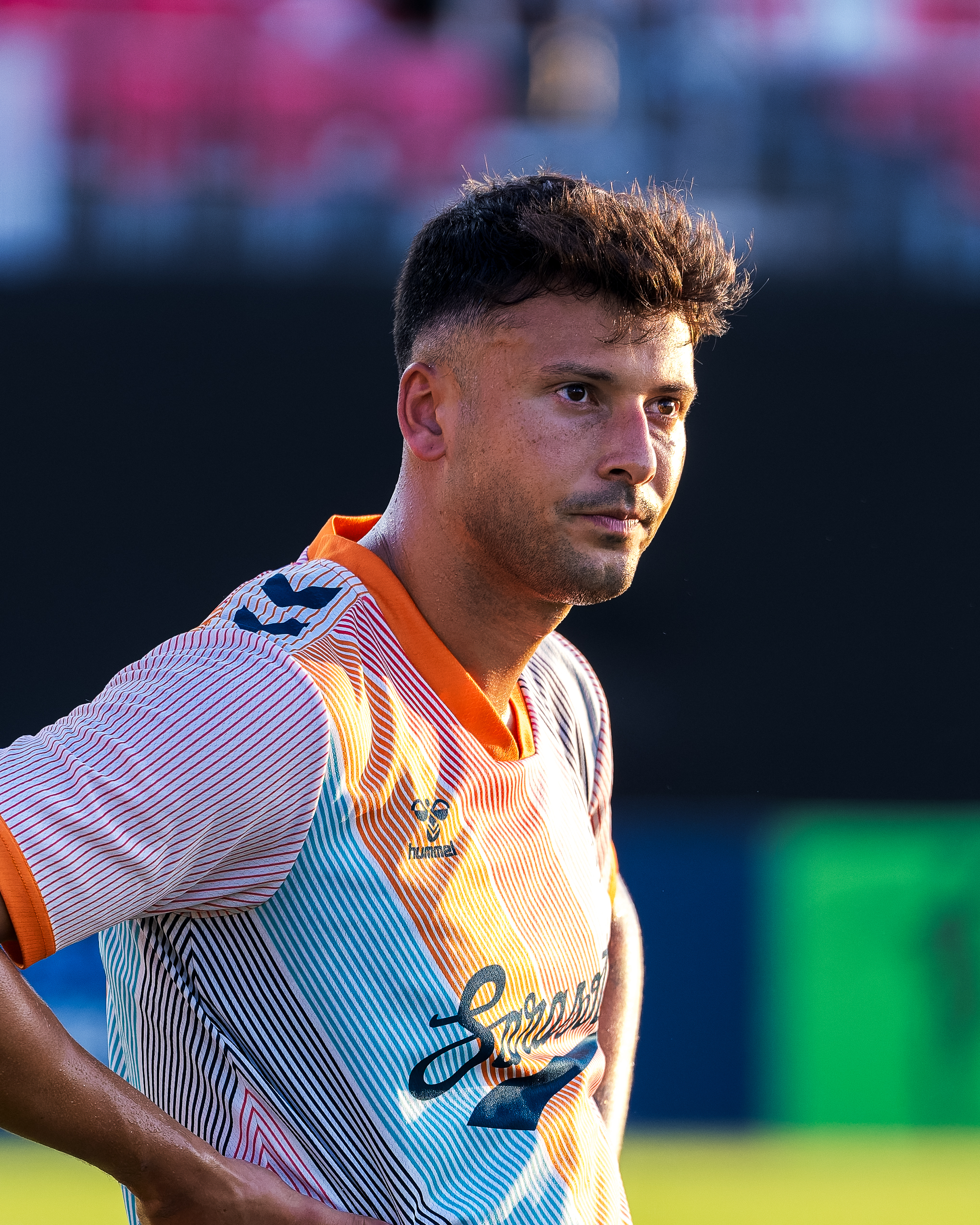
- Stretch with Sarasota Paradise in 2026

Personal information
- Full name: Callum Blu Stretch
- Date of birth: September 18, 1999 (age 27)
- Place of birth: Los Angeles, California, U.S.
- Height: 1.93 m (6 ft 4 in)
- Position: Defender

Team information
- Current team: Las Vegas Lights
- Number: 4

Youth career
- –2015: LA Galaxy
- 2015–2018: Aston Villa

College career
Years	Team	Apps	(Gls)
2018–2020	Denver Pioneers	42	(1)
2022–2023	Loyola Marymount Lions	33	(1)

Senior career*
Years	Team	Apps	(Gls)
2021	Ocean City Nor'easters	6	(0)
2022	Tennessee SC	11	(0)
2024–2025	Tormenta FC	63	(2)
2026	Sarasota Paradise	14	(1)
2026/27–	Las Vegas Lights	1	(0)

International career^{‡}
2015	United States U18	3	(0)
2016	United States U20	1	(0)
2021–	Puerto Rico	10	(0)
Medal record
Representing Puerto Rico
Men's football
FIFA Series
Winner	2026 Puerto Rico
- * Club domestic league appearances and goals as of 8 September 2026 (UTC) ‡ National team caps and goals as of 14:26, 26 March 2026 (UTC)

Callum Blu Stretch (born September 18, 1999) is a footballer who plays as a defender for USL Championship club Las Vegas Lights FC. Born in the United States, he plays for the Puerto Rico national team.

He became the youngest American-born player to sign with an English club when he joined Aston Villa in 2015 at age 15. Prior to joining Aston Villa, Stretch spent a season with the LA Galaxy Academy. Born in Los Angeles, California, he has represented the US U18 and U20's national football team and Puerto Rico national team.

== College career ==
At the University of Denver, Stretch started all 42 matches in two seasons, named Summit League Newcomer of the Year in 2018, two-time All- Summit League Top Performer, No. 2 in the Top-Drawer Mid-season Freshmen Top 100 in 2018, 2019 Summit League All-Tournament Team, Summit Academic All-League Team, tallied one goal at Purdue Fort Wayne and had 12 assists.

In his first year at Loyola Marymount University, Stretch played in all 17 matches, starting 16 and recording one assist on the season. In his second year for the Lions, Stretch played in 16 games and tallied one goal against the Seattle Redhawks.

== Club career ==
Stetch signed his first professional contract on January 18, 2024, joining USL League One side Tormenta FC.

In December 2025, Stretch joined USL League One side Sarasota Paradise.

At the end of the 2026 season, Las Vegas Lights of the USL Championship acquired Stretch via transfer from Sarasota Paradise.

== International career ==
While at Aston Villa, Stretch was selected for the United States Under-18 National Team where he earned 3 caps playing against Finland, Faroe Islands and Iceland in the 2015 Nordic Cup in Sweden. The following year he earned his first cap for the U.S.-U20's National Team in a friendly against Montverde Academy in Florida.

In January 2021, Stretch made his full international debut for Puerto Rico in a 1–0 win over the Dominican Republic. He'd later play 7 more games against Guatemala, Guam, Dominica, Guyana, Cayman and US Virgin Islands earning 10 caps for the senior Puerto Rico National Team.

== Career statistics ==
=== International ===
As of match played 28 March 2026

Appearances and goals by national team and year
National team	Year	Apps	Goals
Puerto Rico	2021	2	0
Puerto Rico	2024	1	0
Puerto Rico	2026	7	0
Total		10	0

== Honours ==
Puerto Rico

- FIFA Series: 2026
