= Ethan Bryant =

American soccer player (born 2001)

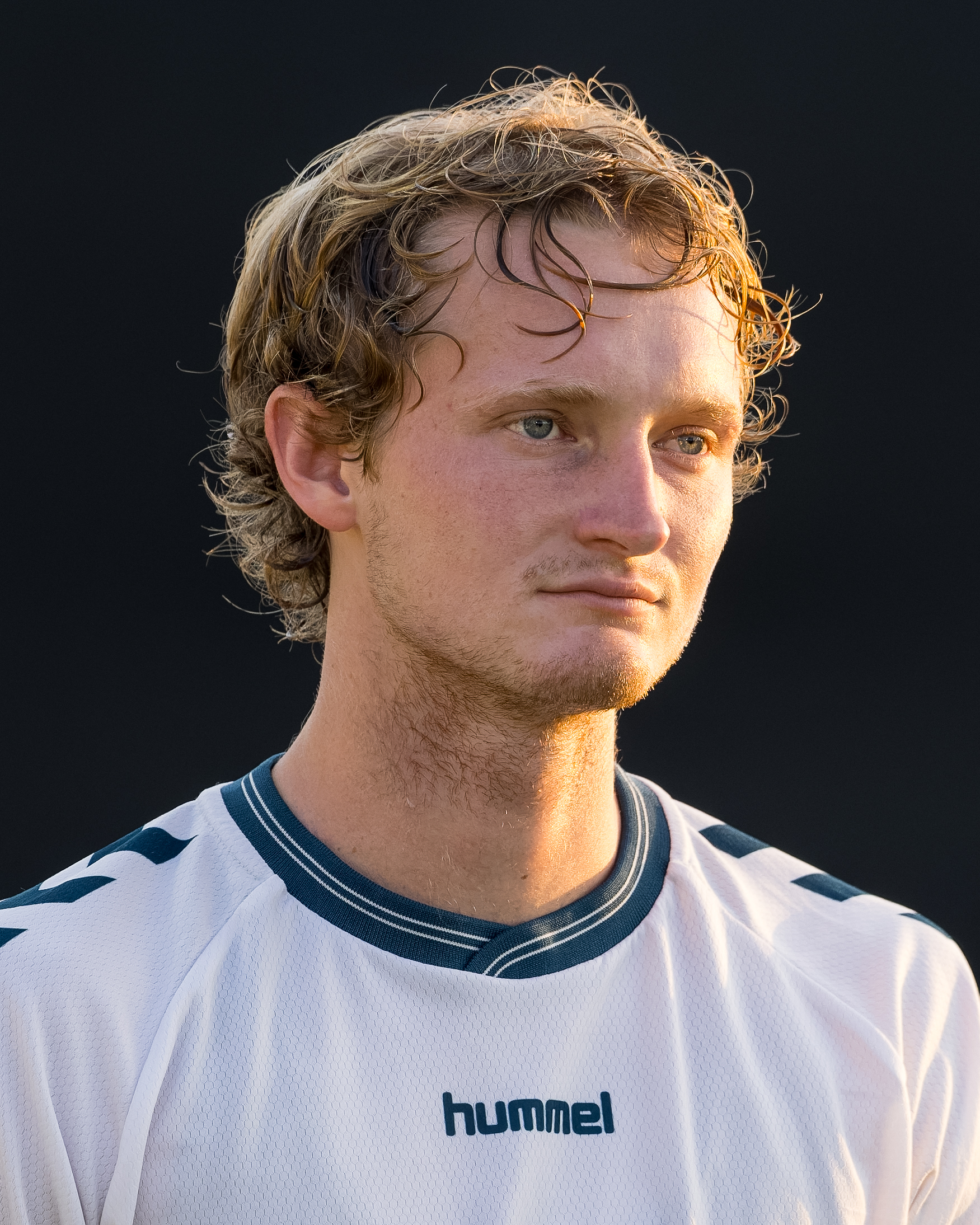
- Bryant playing for the Sarasota Paradise in 2026

Personal information
- Full name: Ethan Bryant
- Date of birth: August 20, 2001 (age 25)
- Place of birth: Longview, Texas, US
- Height: 1.80 m (5 ft 11 in)
- Position: Midfielder

Youth career
- Classic Elite Soccer Club
- San Antonio FC

Senior career*
Years	Team	Apps	(Gls)
2018–2021	San Antonio FC	16	(2)
2019	→ Roeselare (loan)	0	(0)
2021	→ Richmond Kickers (loan)	13	(0)
2022	Richmond Kickers	28	(3)
2023–2024	Sporting Kansas City II	52	(13)
2023	Sporting Kansas City	2	(0)
2025	Monterey Bay FC	15	(0)
2026	Sarasota Paradise	32	(1)
- * Club domestic league appearances and goals as of November 2, 2026

Ethan Bryant (born August 20, 2001) is an American professional soccer player who plays as a midfielder. He most recently played for USL League One club Sarasota Paradise.

== Career ==
=== San Antonio FC ===
Bryant signed his first professional contract with San Antonio FC on February 14, 2018. He made his professional debut on May 23, 2018, starting in a U.S. Open Cup match against the Colorado Springs Switchbacks. Bryant became San Antonio FC's youngest all-time goalscorer on September 29, 2018, when he scored his first professional goal against Seattle Sounders FC 2. On January 16, 2019, it was announced that Bryant would again play for the SAFC senior squad during their 2019 USL Championship season.

=== Richmond Kickers ===
During the 2021 season, San Antonio FC loaned Bryant to USL League One side Richmond Kickers where he saw 13 appearances. Following the 2021 season, Richmond signed Bryant on a permanent basis.

The 2022 season saw Bryant as a regular midfield starter, with 28 appearances. The Kickers finished top of the regular season table, and Bryant was named USL League One Young Player of the Year.

=== Sporting Kansas City II ===
On December 13, 2022, Richmond announced a transfer of Bryant to MLS Next Pro side Sporting Kansas City II for an undisclosed fee.

=== Monterey Bay FC ===
Bryant returned to the USL Championship in January 2025, signing a two-year contract with Monterey Bay FC. Bryant departed Monterey Bay during the 2026 preseason, his contract being ended by mutual consent.

=== Sarasota Paradise ===
On February 27, 2026, Bryant returned to USL League One, joining expansion side Sarasota Paradise.

== Statistics ==
As of December 13, 2022

Club	Season	League			Cup (Note: Appearances in U.S. Open Cup)		Other		Totals	
Club	Season	League	Apps	Goals	Apps	Goals	Apps	Goals	Apps	Goals
San Antonio FC	2018	USL	10	1	2	0	—		12	1
San Antonio FC	2019	USLC	6	1	1	0	—		7	1
San Antonio FC	2020	USLC	2	0	0	0	—		0	0
San Antonio FC	Totals		18	2	3	0	0	0	21	2
Richmond Kickers	2021	USL1	13	0	0	0	—		13	0
Richmond Kickers	2022	USL1	28	3	2	0	—		30	3
Richmond Kickers	Totals		41	3	2	0	0	0	43	3
Sporting Kansas City II	2023	MLS Next Pro	27	8	0	0	—		27	8
Sporting Kansas City II	2024	MLS Next Pro	25	5	0	0	—		25	5
Sporting Kansas City	2023	Major League Soccer	0	0	2	0	—		2	0
Sporting Kansas City	Totals		52	13	2	0	0	0	54	13
Monterey Bay FC	2025	USLC	15	0	1	0	2 (Note: Appearances in USL Cup)	0	18	0
Sarasota Paradise	2026	USL1	2	0	0	0	0	0	2	0
Career totals			128	18	8	0	2	0	149	26

== Honors ==
=== Individual ===
- USL League One Young Player of the Year: 2022
