= 2026 Pittsburgh Riverhounds SC season =

Pittsburgh Riverhounds SC
2026 season
- Owner: Tuffy Shallenberger
- Head coach: Rob Vincent
- U.S. Open Cup: Round of 32
- USL Cup: Group Stage
Home colors	Third colors

The 2026 Pittsburgh Riverhounds SC season is the Pittsburgh Riverhounds SC's twenty-seventh season of existence, their tenth season in the second tier of American soccer, and their sixteenth season in the league now named the USL Championship. The Riverhounds, are coming off their first league championship in club history, having won the 2025 USL Championship playoffs final against FC Tulsa.

Over the offseason, the Riverhounds officially promoted previously interim coach Rob Vincent to the official head coach, after taking the reins from Bob Lilley, who was placed on administrative leave in mid-October in the middle of Lilley's eighth season as head coach of the Riverhounds.

== Roster ==
As of March 3, 2026

Note: Flags indicate national team as defined under FIFA eligibility rules; some limited exceptions apply. Players may hold more than one non-FIFA nationality.

No.	Pos.	Nation	Player
1	GK	ESP	Nico Campuzano
2	MF	USA	Danny Griffin
3	DF	USA	Perrin Barnes
4	DF	GER	Lasse Kelp
5	DF	USA	Victor Souza
6	DF	USA	Owen Mikoy
7	FW	USA	Trevor Amann
8	DF	CGO	Junior Etou
9	FW	CMR	Albert Dikwa
10	MF	USA	Charles Ahl
13	MF	USA	Max Viera
14	MF	USA	Robbie Mertz
15	MF	USA	Bradley Sample

No.	Pos.	Nation	Player
16	DF	PUR	Beto Ydrach
17	FW	NOR	Brigham Larsen
18	MF	USA	Jorge Garcia
19	MF	USA	Sam Bassett
20	GK	USA	Mitch Budler
22	MF	USA	Warren Agostini
23	DF	FRA	Guillaume Vacter
24	GK	USA	Mike Sheridan
27	FW	USA	Aldi Flowers-Gamboa
28	DF	GHA	Illal Osumanu
37	MF	ENG	Eliot Goldthorp
42	MF	USA	Jackson Wälti

1. USL Academy Contract

== Competitive ==
=== USL Championship ===
On December 16, 2025, the USL Championship released the schedule for all 25 teams for both the regular season and the USL Cup.

==== Eastern Conference standings ====
Pos	Team	Pld	W	L	T	GF	GA	GD	Pts	Qualification
2	Detroit City FC (Q)	28	14	6	8	34	20	+14	50	Playoffs
3	Charleston Battery (Q)	28	14	9	5	53	34	+19	47	Playoffs
4	Pittsburgh Riverhounds SC (Q)	28	12	11	5	30	28	+2	41	Playoffs
5	Rhode Island FC (Q)	28	12	11	5	40	30	+10	41	Playoffs
6	Hartford Athletic (Q)	28	9	6	13	31	29	+2	40	Playoffs

Updated to match(es) played on October 14, 2026. Source: USL Championship Standings
Rules for classification: 1) total wins against conference opponents; 2) goal differential against conference opponents; 3) goals scored against conference opponents; 4) head-to-head points against conference opponents; 5) points per game against conference opponents; 6) points per game against non-conference opponents; 7) fewest disciplinary points; 8) coin toss or drawing of lots
(Q) Qualified for the phase indicated

==== Match results ====
All times are in Eastern Standard Time.

March 7 1	Charleston Battery	2–1	Pittsburgh Riverhounds SC	Mount Pleasant, SC
6:00 PM	Suber 45+1'; Cabrera 52'	Report	Messer 62' (o.g.)	Stadium: Patriots Point Soccer Complex; Attendance: 5,012; Referee: Natalie Simon

March 14, 2026 2	Loudoun United FC	2–3	Pittsburgh Riverhounds SC	Leesburg, Virginia
3:00 PM	Úlfarsson 20'; Young 70'	Report	Dikwa Lega 26' (pen.); Sample 48'; Bassett 69'	Stadium: Segra Field; Attendance: 1,696; Referee: Matthew Corrigan

March 21, 2026 3	Tampa Bay Rowdies	3–0	Pittsburgh Riverhounds SC	St. Petersburg, Florida
7:30 PM	Cicerone 45+2'; Myers 77'; Evan Conway 90+4'	Report		Stadium: Al Lang Stadium; Attendance: 6,267; Referee: John Griggs

March 28, 2026 4	Pittsburgh Riverhounds SC	3–2	Sporting Club Jacksonville	Pittsburgh, Pennsylvania
7:00 PM	Dikwa Lega 7', 50' (pen.); Bassett 27'	Report	Traore 58'; Jääskeläinen 62'	Stadium: Highmark Stadium; Attendance: 4,118; Referee: Atahan Yaya

April 4, 2026 5	Indy Eleven	1–1	Pittsburgh Riverhounds SC	Indianapolis, Indiana
7:00 PM	Blake 20' (pen.); Rendón (yellow card) 39'; Okello (yellow card) 74'	Report	Souza (yellow card) 36'; Goldthorp 90+1'	Stadium: Carroll Stadium; Attendance: 8,304; Referee: Matthew Thompson

April 11, 2026 6	Birmingham Legion FC	1–0	Pittsburgh Riverhounds SC	Birmingham, Alabama
5:00 PM	Tregarthen 25'	Report		Stadium: Protective Stadium; Attendance: 3,316; Referee: Mark Verso

April 18, 2025 7	Pittsburgh Riverhounds SC	2–1	Detroit City FC	Pittsburgh, Pennsylvania
7:00 PM	Dikwa 2' 83'; Mertz (yellow card) 6'; Walti (yellow card) 44'; Ahl (yellow card) 76'; Campuzano (yellow card) 90'	Report	Egbuchulam 90+2'; Smith (yellow card) 90+3'	Stadium: Highmark Stadium; Attendance: 3,946; Referee: Elton García

May 2, 2026 8	Pittsburgh Riverhounds SC	0–1	Phoenix Rising FC	Pittsburgh, Pennsylvania
7:00 PM	Lega (yellow card) 53'	Report	Moursou (yellow card) 57'; Sacko 64'; Dennis (yellow card) 89'	Stadium: Highmark Stadium; Attendance: 4,439; Referee: Alyssa Pennington

May 9, 2026 9	Louisville City FC	0–2	Pittsburgh Riverhounds SC	Louisville, Kentucky
7:00 PM		Report	Amann 9'; Bassett 52'	Stadium: Lynn Family Stadium; Attendance: 9,847; Referee: Brandon Stevis

May 30, 2026 10	Pittsburgh Riverhounds SC	2–0	Miami FC	Pittsburgh, Pennsylvania
7:00 PM	Dikwa Lega 49'; Ahl 73'	Report		Stadium: Highmark Stadium; Attendance: 6,053; Referee: Carlos Rodriguez

June 13, 2026 11	Pittsburgh Riverhounds	1–0	Indy Eleven	Pittsburgh, PA
7:00 PM EST	Barnes (yellow card) 10'; Mikoy (yellow card) 62'; Kelp 90+2'; Dikwa (yellow card) 90+6'	Report	Lindley (yellow card) 21'; Craig (yellow card) 56'; Neidlinger (yellow card) 90+5'	Stadium: Highmark Stadium; Attendance: 5,977; Referee: Nabil Bensalah

June 20, 2026 12	Hartford Athletic	0–0	Pittsburgh Riverhounds SC	Hartford, Connecticut
7:00 PM		Report		Stadium: Trinity Health Stadium; Attendance: 4,130; Referee: Jeremy Scheer

July 4, 2026 13	Pittsburgh Riverhounds SC	0–2	Brooklyn FC	Pittsburgh, Pennsylvania
7:00 PM	Dikwa (red card) 76'	Report	Olney 49'; Kante 90+3'; Stojanovic (yellow card) 45+1' (yellow-red card) 76'	Stadium: Highmark Stadium; Attendance: 6,376; Referee: Amin Hadzic

July 15, 2026 14	Sporting Club Jacksonville	2–1	Pittsburgh Riverhounds SC	Jacksonville, Florida
7:30 PM	Sadlier 50'; Souza 78' (o.g.)	Report	Amann 29'	Stadium: Hodges Stadium; Attendance: 1,067; Referee: John Matto

July 18, 2026 15	Pittsburgh Riverhounds SC	3–1	Louisville City FC	Pittsburgh, Pennsylvania
7:00 PM	Amann 47', 48', 50'	Report	Wilson 68' (pen.)	Stadium: Highmark Stadium; Attendance: 4,757; Referee: Cristian Campo Hernández
Note: Trevor Amann's hat trick was the fastest hat trick in USL Championship history.

July 25, 2026 16	Pittsburgh Riverhounds SC	0–1	Rhode Island FC	Pittsburgh, Pennsylvania
7:00 PM		Report	J. Williams 62'	Stadium: F.N.B. Stadium; Attendance: 6,012; Referee: Abdou Ndiaye

July 29, 2026 17	Pittsburgh Riverhounds SC	0–1	FC Tulsa	Pittsburgh, Pennsylvania
7:00 PM		Report	Dorsey 13'	Stadium: Highmark Stadium; Attendance: 4,681; Referee: Brandon Stevis

August 1, 2026 18	Oakland Roots SC	0–1	Pittsburgh Riverhounds SC	Oakland, California
10:00 PM		Report	Goldthorp 20'	Stadium: Oakland Coliseum; Attendance: 5,349; Referee: Muhammad Hassan

August 8, 2026 19	Pittsburgh Riverhounds SC	0–0	Sacramento Republic FC	Pittsburgh, Pennsylvania
7:00 PM		Report		Stadium: Highmark Stadium; Attendance: 5,251; Referee: Matthew Thompson

August 15, 2026 20	Pittsburgh Riverhounds SC	3–1	Charleston Battery	Pittsburgh, Pennsylvania
7:00 PM	Amann 2'; Griffin 16'; Souza 61'	Report	Martínez 18', (yellow card) 78' (yellow-red card) 81'	Stadium: Highmark Stadium; Attendance: 6,020; Referee: Nabil Bensalah

August 22, 2026 21	Brooklyn FC	0–1	Pittsburgh Riverhounds SC	Brooklyn, New York
7:00 PM		Report	Bassett 83'	Stadium: Maimonides Park; Attendance: 965; Referee: Calin Radosav

August 26, 2026 22	El Paso Locomotive FC	2–1	Pittsburgh Riverhounds SC	El Paso, Texas
9:00 PM	Calvillo 57'; Dollenmayer 90+3'	Report	Mertz 53'	Stadium: Southwest University Park; Attendance: 5,099; Referee: Elton García

August 29, 2026 23	Pittsburgh Riverhounds SC	0–0	Tampa Bay Rowdies	Pittsburgh, Pennsylvania
5:00 PM		Report		Stadium: Highmark Stadium; Attendance: 5,861; Referee: Elvis Osmanovic

September 5, 2026 24	Miami FC	2–2	Pittsburgh Riverhounds SC	Miami, Florida
7:00 PM	Rocha 45+4'; Knutson 90+10'	Report	Amann 45+8' (pen.); Bassett 60'	Stadium: Pitbull Stadium; Referee: Matthew Corrigan

September 12, 2026 25	Pittsburgh Riverhounds SC	1–0	Loudoun United FC	Pittsburgh, Pennsylvania
7:00 PM	Bassett 8'	Report		Stadium: Highmark Stadium; Attendance: 5,150; Referee: John Griggs

September 19, 2026 26	Detroit City FC	1–0	Pittsburgh Riverhounds SC	Hamtramck, Michigan
7:00 PM	K. Williams 73'	Report		Stadium: Keyworth Stadium; Attendance: 5,319; Referee: Matthew Thompson

September 26, 2026 27	Orange County SC	1–0	Pittsburgh Riverhounds SC	Irvine, California
10:00 PM	Bazini 90'	Report		Stadium: Championship Soccer Stadium; Attendance: 3,882; Referee: Abdou Ndiaye

October 10, 2026 28	Pittsburgh Riverhounds SC	2–1	Hartford Athletic	Pittsburgh, Pennsylvania
7:00 PM	Amann 6'; Ahl 66'	Report	Ngalina 41'	Stadium: Highmark Stadium; Attendance: 5,110; Referee: Atahan Yaya

October 7, 2026 29	Rhode Island FC	1–1	Pittsburgh Riverhounds SC	Pawtucket, Rhode Island
7:30 PM	Foyo 74'	Report	Goldthorp 90+5'	Stadium: Centreville Bank Stadium; Attendance: 9,758; Referee: Joshua Encarnación

October 24, 2026 30	Pittsburgh Riverhounds SC	v	Birmingham Legion FC	Pittsburgh, Pennsylvania
7:00 PM				Stadium: Highmark Stadium

=== USL Cup ===
The Riverhounds participated in the third edition of the USL Cup, and the second edition to feature teams from both the USL Championship and League One. Despite going through all four group matches unbeaten, the Riverhounds failed to gather enough points to qualify for the knockout stage, exiting the inter-league competition in the group stage.

==== Standings ====
Pos	Lg	Team	Pld	W	PKW	PKL	L	GF	GA	GD	Pts	Qualification
1	USL1	Charlotte Independence	4	2	2	0	0	6	4	+2	10	Advance to knockout stage
2	USLC	Charleston Battery	4	2	1	1	0	8	3	+5	9	
3	USLC	Pittsburgh Riverhounds SC	4	2	0	2	0	6	1	+5	8	
4	USL1	Greenville Triumph SC	4	1	0	0	3	4	7	−3	3	
5	USLC	Loudoun United FC	4	1	0	0	3	4	7	−3	3	

==== Group stage ====
April 25, 2026	Pittsburgh Riverhounds SC	3–0	Greenville Triumph SC	Pittsburgh, Pennsylvania
7:00 PM	Amann 7', 62'; Viera 42'	Report		Stadium: F.N.B. Stadium; Attendance: 3,989; Referee: Luis Arroyo

May 15, 2026	Charlotte Independence	1–1 (4–2 p)	Pittsburgh Riverhounds SC	Charlotte, North Carolina
7:30 PM	Garcia 81'	Report	Manzinga 22'	Stadium: American Legion Memorial Stadium; Attendance: 2,545; Referee: Elvis Osmanovic
	Penalties
	Álvarez (penalty scored); Bakero (penalty scored); Romero (penalty scored); Marou (penalty scored)		(penalty scored) Bassett; (penalty missed) Ahl; (penalty scored) Dikwa; (penalty missed) Mertz

June 6, 2026	Charleston Battery	0–0 (4–2 p)	Pittsburgh Riverhounds SC	Mount Pleasant, South Carolina
7:00 p.m.		Report		Stadium: Patriots Point; Attendance: 4,475; Referee: Rodrigo Albuquerque
	Penalties
	Suber (penalty scored); Berry (penalty scored); Pakmohov (penalty scored); Akpunonu (penalty scored)		(penalty scored) Mertz; (penalty scored) Wälti; (penalty missed) Garcia; (penalty missed) Flowers-Gamboa

July 11, 2026	Pittsburgh Riverhounds SC	2–0	Loudoun United FC	Pittsburgh, Pennsylvania
5:00 PM	Amann 19' (pen.); Dikwa 66'	Report		Stadium: Highmark Stadium; Attendance: 5,027; Referee: Kalilou Jarju

=== U.S. Open Cup ===
The Riverhounds, as a member of the second division USL Championship, entered the U.S. Open Cup in the First Round, matched up against fellow Pittsburgh-based club Steel City FC. After a comfortable 2–1 victory at home, they were matched up again at home against another amateur soccer club Virginia Dream FC of the United Premier Soccer League, whom they also had relative ease against. After two matches at home, the Riverhounds were drawn away in the Round of 32, the Riverhounds were scheduled to play against first-division MLS club New York Red Bulls, whom they eventually lost to 3–1.

March 25 Round 1	(Pennsylvania) Pittsburgh Riverhounds SC (USLC)	2–1	(Pennsylvania) Steel City FC (USL2)	Pittsburgh, Pennsylvania
7:00 PM ET	Griffin 6'; Ahl 66'	Report	Graeca 76' (pen.)	Stadium: Highmark Stadium; Attendance: 4,287; Referee: Samuel Reynolds

March 31 Round 2	Pittsburgh Riverhounds SC (USLC) (Pennsylvania)	2–0	Virginia Dream FC (UPSL)	Pittsburgh, Pennsylvania
7:00 p.m. ET	Griffin 51'; Goldthorp 59' (pen.)	Report		Stadium: Highmark Stadium; Attendance: 1,817; Referee: Shevket Dzhaparov

April 15 Round of 32	(New Jersey) New York Red Bulls (MLS)	3–1	(Pennsylvania) Pittsburgh Riverhounds SC (USLC)	Harrison, New Jersey
7:30 PM ET	Forsberg 25'; Hall 28', 47'	Report	Amann 79'	Stadium: Sports Illustrated Stadium; Referee: Jeremy Scheer
