= Garrett McLaughlin =

American soccer player (born 1997)

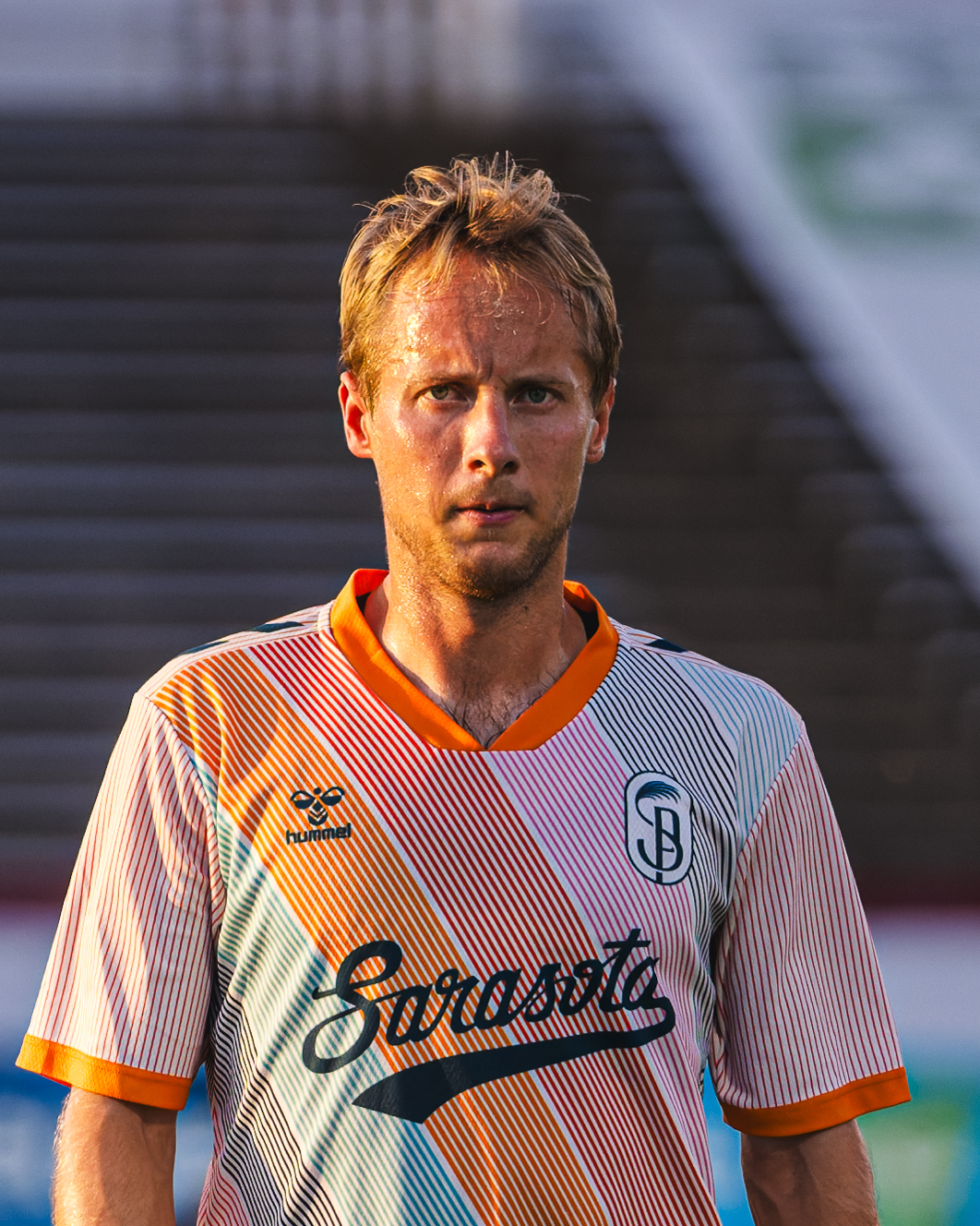
- McLaughlin with Sarasota Paradise in 2026

Personal information
- Date of birth: November 10, 1997 (age 29)
- Place of birth: Oklahoma City, Oklahoma, U.S
- Height: 6 ft 0 in (1.83 m)
- Position: Forward

Youth career
- Oklahoma FC 97

College career
Years	Team	Apps	(Gls)
2016–2019	SMU Mustangs	72	(36)

Senior career*
Years	Team	Apps	(Gls)
2016–2018	OKC Energy U23	27	(4)
2020	Rio Grande Valley FC	11	(0)
2021	Toronto FC II	25	(8)
2022–2024	North Carolina FC	71	(23)
2024–2025	Forward Madison	35	(3)
2026	Sarasota Paradise	27	(2)
- * Club domestic league appearances and goals as of November 2, 2026

Garrett McLaughlin (born November 10, 1997) is an American soccer player who recently played for USL League One side Sarasota Paradise.

== Early life ==
McLaughlin played high school soccer at Heritage Hall, where he was a two-time Oklahoma Gatorade Player of the Year and led the school to 3 state championships.

== College career ==
McLaughlin played four years of college soccer at Southern Methodist University between 2016 and 2019. McLaughlin made 72 appearances, scored 36 goals and tallied 13 assists for the Mustangs. He was named the 2016 American Athletic Conference Freshman of the Year, first team All-AAC in 2017 and 2019, second team All-AAC in 2018, and United Soccer Coaches third team All-American in 2017.

== Club career ==
While at college, McLaughlin appeared for USL PDL side OKC Energy U23.

On January 9, 2020, McLaughlin was selected 8th overall in the 2020 MLS SuperDraft by Houston Dynamo.

On February 27, 2020, McLaughlin signed for Houston's USL Championship affiliate side Rio Grande Valley FC. He made his professional debut on March 8, 2020, starting in a 5–1 loss to LA Galaxy II.

On April 22, 2021, McLaughlin signed with USL League One side Toronto FC II. He scored two goals on his debut for the club on May 22, 2021, against North Texas SC. On July 18, he scored a hat trick in a 4–2 victory over North Carolina FC, including a bicycle kick on his second goal. He finished the season as the team's leading goal scorer with 8 goals and was named Player of the Week twice. After the season, he went on trial with Major League Soccer club Real Salt Lake.

McLaughlin joined North Carolina FC on February 11, 2022. On May 30, 2022, McLaughlin was named USL League One Player of the Week for Week 9 of the 2022 season, in recognition of his brace over Richmond Kickers on May 28.

After making ten appearances for North Carolina in their 2024 season, McLaughlin was transferred to Forward Madison on June 25. McLaughlin stated in an interview that his contract with Forward Madison would run through the 2025 season.

== Career statistics ==
As of October 30, 2026.

Club	Season	League			Playoffs		Domestic Cup (Note: Appearance(s) in U.S. Open Cup)		League Cup		Total	
Club	Season	Division	Apps	Goals	Apps	Goals	Apps	Goals	Apps	Goals	Apps	Goals
OKC Energy U23	2016	Premier Development League	12	0	0	0	—		—		12	0
OKC Energy U23	2017	Premier Development League	8	1	0	0	—		—		8	1
OKC Energy U23	2018	Premier Development League	7	3	—		—		—		7	3
OKC Energy U23	Total		27	4	0	0	0	0	0	0	27	4
Rio Grande Valley FC	2020	USL Championship	11	0	—		—		—		11	0
Toronto FC II	2021	USL League One	25	8	—		—		—		25	8
North Carolina FC	2022	USL League One	30	14	—		1	0	—		31	14
North Carolina FC	2023	USL League One	31	9	2	0	1	0	—		32	9
North Carolina FC	2024	USL Championship	10	0	—		2	0	—		12	0
North Carolina FC	Total		71	23	2	0	4	0	0	0	77	23
Forward Madison FC	2024	USL League One	13	0	2	0	0	0	5 (Note: Appearances in USL League One playoffs)	1	20	1
Forward Madison FC	2025	USL League One	24	3	2	0	0	0	2 (Note: Appearances in USL Cup)	1	28	4
Forward Madison FC	Total		37	0	4	0	0	0	7	2	44	5
Sarasota Paradise	2026	USL League One	27	2	0	0	—		3	0	30	3
Career Total			198	40	6	0	4	0	10	2	218	42
