= Andrés Rodríguez-Pose =

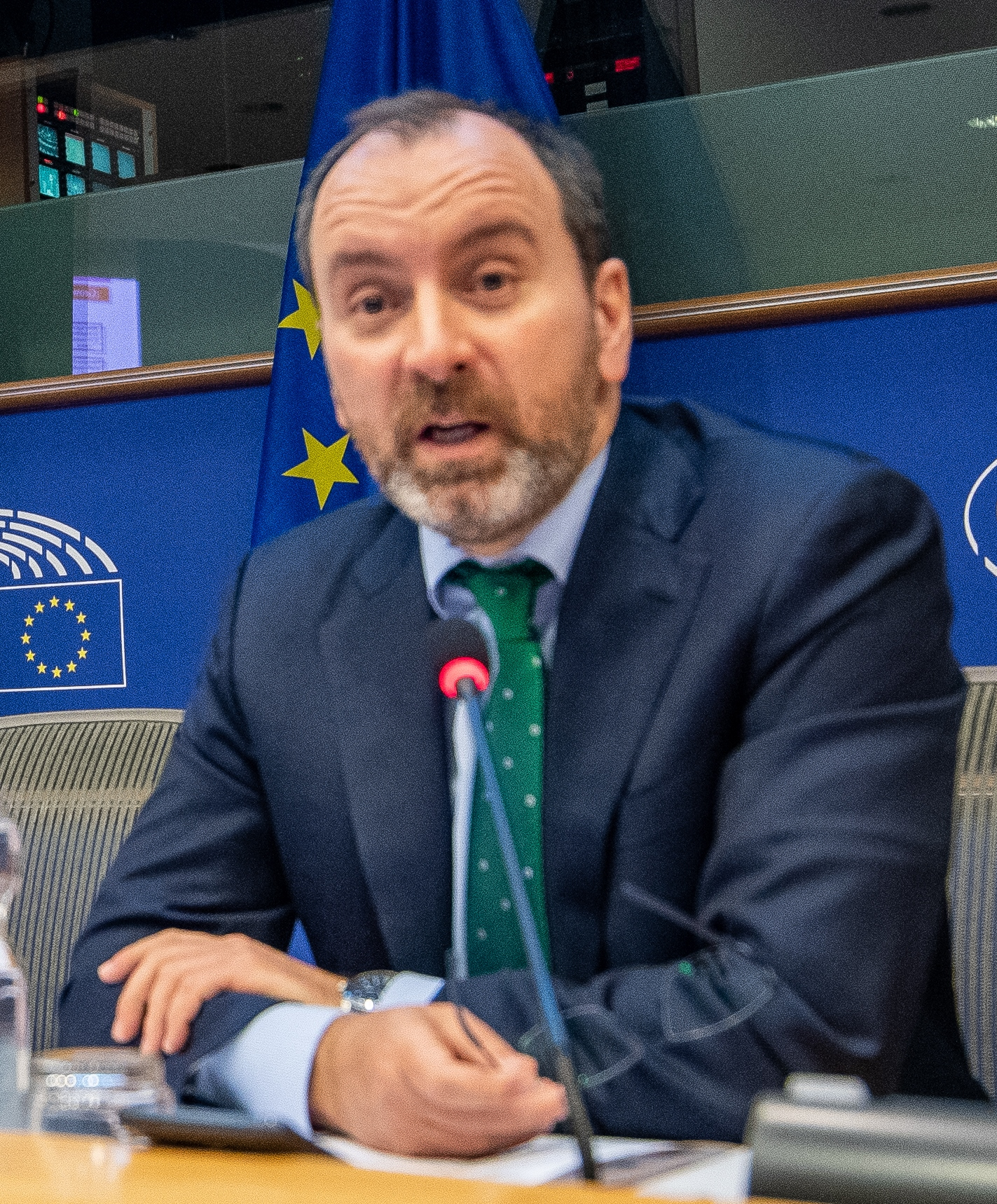
- Andrés Rodríguez-Pose (European Parliament, 2019)
- Occupation: Economic geographer
- Board member of: Editor, Economic Geography; Editor-in-chief, Journal of Geographical Systems

Academic background
- Education: European University Institute (Ph.D., 1996); Universidad Complutense de Madrid (Ph.D., 1993)
- Thesis: The socio-political bases of regional growth in Western Europe (1996)
- Doctoral advisor: Gøsta Esping-Andersen (EUI); Mercedes Molina Ibáñez (UCM)

Academic work
- Discipline: Geography, Regional Science
- Institutions: London School of Economics
- Website: https://personal.lse.ac.uk/rodrigu1/

Andrés Rodríguez-Pose is a professor of economic geography at the London School of Economics and Political Science and former head of its Department of Geography and Environment (2006-2009).

== Biography ==
He was president of the Regional Science Association International (RSAI) (2015-2017).

Among his honours is the 2018 ERSA Prize in Regional Science, considered to be among the highest awards in regional science, as well as Honorary Doctorates in Geosciences from Utrecht University and Economics from Jönköping University.
