= USS Erben =

Fletcher-class destroyer

Coordinates: 37.5364833°N 126.9782484°E

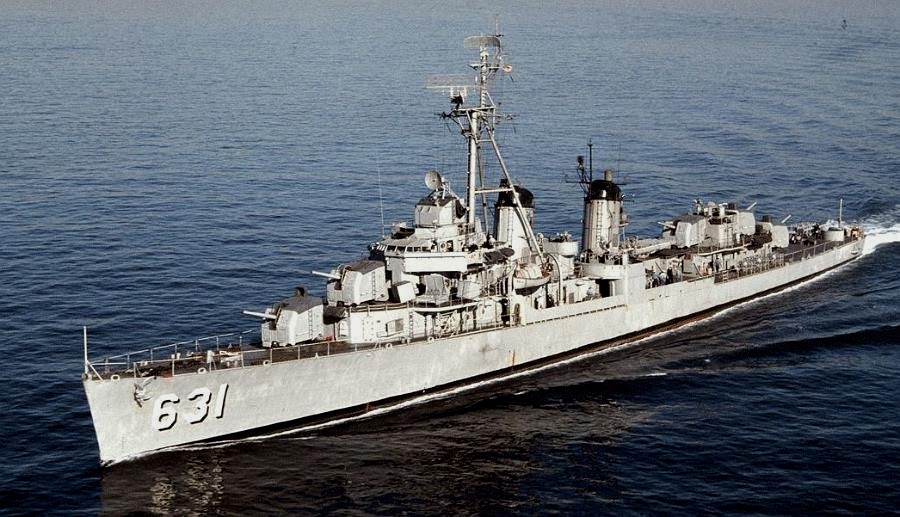
- USS Erben underway the 1950s

History

United States
- Name: Erben
- Namesake: Henry Erben
- Builder: Bath Iron Works
- Laid down: 28 October 1942
- Launched: 21 March 1943
- Sponsored by: Mrs. C. B. G. Gaillard
- Commissioned: 28 May 1943
- Decommissioned: 27 June 1958
- Stricken: 2 June 1975
- Identification: Callsign: NUBJ; Hull number: DD-631
- Fate: Transferred to South Korea, 16 May 1963
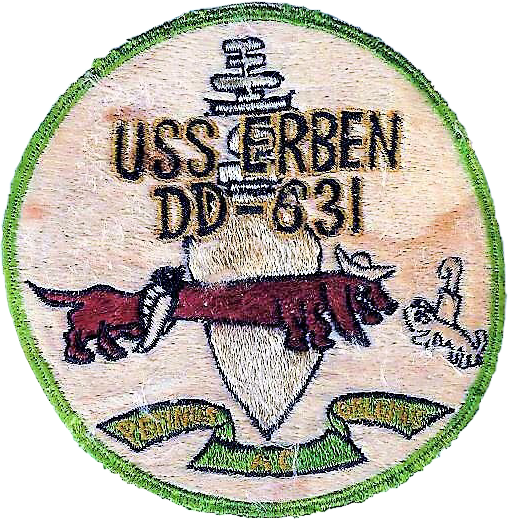
- Badge

South Korea
- Name: Chungmu; (충무)
- Namesake: Chungmu
- Acquired: 16 May 1963
- Commissioned: 16 May 1963
- Decommissioned: 1993
- Reclassified: DD-911
- Identification: Hull number: DD-91
- Fate: Scrapped, 1993
- Notes: Training vessel in 1983

General characteristics
- Class & type: Fletcher-class destroyer; Chungmu-class destroyer
- Displacement: 2,050 tons
- Length: 376 ft 6 in (114.7 m)
- Beam: 39 ft 8 in (12.1 m)
- Draft: 17 ft 9 in (5.4 m)
- Propulsion: 60,000 shp (45 MW); 2 propellers
- Speed: 35 knots (65 km/h; 40 mph)
- Range: 6500 nm at 15 kn (12,000 km at 28 km/h)
- Complement: 329
- Armament: 5 × 5-inch 38 caliber, 4 × 40 mm AA guns, 4 × 20 mm AA guns, 10 × 21 inch (533 mm) torpedo tubes, 6 × depth charge projectors, 2 × depth charge tracks

USS Erben (DD-631), a Fletcher-class destroyer, was a ship of the United States Navy named for Rear Admiral Henry Erben (1832–1909).

Erben (DD-631) was launched 21 March 1943 by Bath Iron Works Corp., Bath, Maine; sponsored by Mrs. C. B. G. Gaillard, daughter of Rear Admiral Erben; and commissioned 28 May 1943.

== Service history ==
=== United States Navy ===
==== World War II ====
===== 1943 =====
Arriving at Pearl Harbor 2 October 1943 from Boston, Erben joined the 5th Fleet and trained in the Hawaiian Islands, on 1 November. She rescued a downed aviator during exercises with an aircraft carrier. She sailed from Pearl Harbor 8 November, rendezvoused with a carrier task group on 15 November, and screened it during preinvasion air attacks on the Gilbert Islands, several times rescuing aviators whose planes had crashed or run out of fuel. As the invasion waves of Marines were landed on Tarawa on 20 November, Erben continued to screen the carriers launching supporting strikes, providing protection with her antiaircraft fire when 13 Japanese torpedo planes attacked late in the afternoon. She again effectively fired against Japanese planes that attacked the task group as it retired from strikes in the Marshall Islands on 4 December.

===== 1944 =====
Erben replenished at Pearl Harbor, and put to sea 21 December 1943 for Funafuti to exercise with the support group organized for the invasion of the Marshalls. She sailed 23 January 1944, and on 29 January saw action in the bombardment of Taroa and Wotje. The next day she hunted Japanese shipping off Maloelap, firing on a beached fishing ship, and on the 31st, as the assault landings took place, gave fire support to the troops ashore. Five times, she appeared off Taroa for night bombardment and harassing fire, and from 2 February operated out of Majuro on patrol in the Marshalls.

The destroyer returned to Guadalcanal 17 March 1944, and after escorting troop transports to Cape Torokina, prepared at Milne Bay for the Hollandia operation, during which she screened carriers giving air support to the landings at Aitape and Hollandia through April. Through much of May, she trained in the New Hebrides and Russell Islands, and on 8 June arrived at Kwajalein to stage for the Marianas operation. From 12 June, when she sortied with the carriers, until 4 August, when she returned to Eniwetok, she was almost constantly at sea to screen the carriers as they launched preinvasion air strikes, covered the landings, won a most significant victory in the Battle of the Philippine Sea, and furnished antisubmarine and air protection to assault shipping.

From Eniwetok, Erben returned to a month of brief overhaul and training in the Hawaiian Islands, then put out for Manus Island, from which she sailed 14 October 1944 to escort transports to the Leyte landings of 20 October. She patrolled and furnished antiaircraft fire to protect the transports until 24 October, then as the Battle for Leyte Gulf raged, sailed for Humboldt Bay to guard the retirement of LSTs. She returned to Leyte 14 November with a convoy of reinforcements, and sailed the same day for Manus, Majuro, Pearl Harbor, and a west coast overhaul.

===== 1945 =====
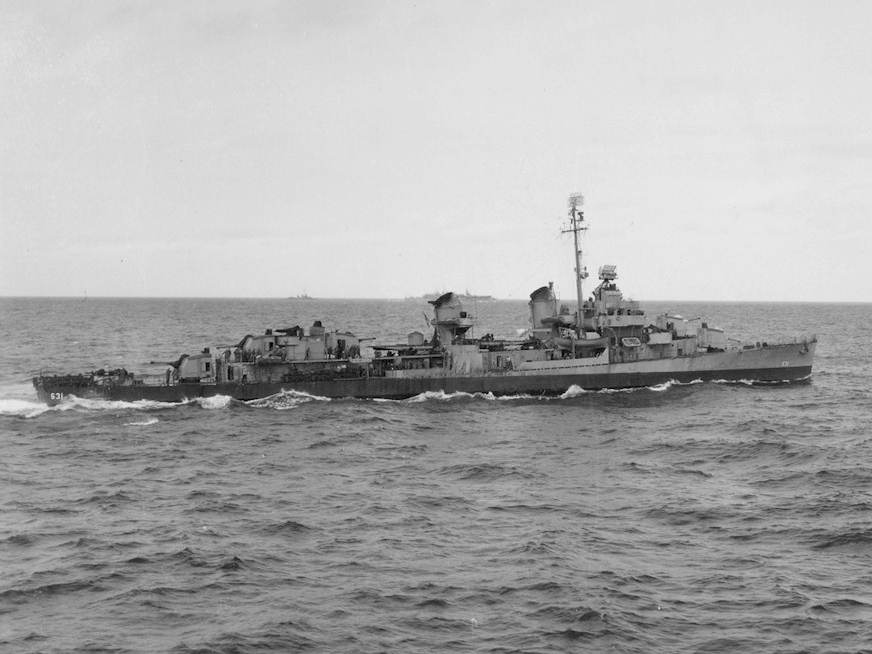
Erben underway in September 1945.

Erben was back in action 15 March 1945 when she rendezvoused one day out of Ulithi with the fast carrier task force for air strikes on Kyūshū and Okinawa. During two of these, on 26 and 30 March, she rescued a total of four downed aviators. The pounding of Okinawa reached its height for the invasion landings of 1 April, and Erben continued to screen the carriers as they operated off the island through the next 2 months. She fired with success to drive off kamikazes, rescued survivors of damaged ships, bombarded shore targets, and saved many downed aviators. On 3 and 23 May, she rescued the same three-man plane crew from Randolph.

Through June 1945, Erben was in Leyte Gulf for repairs to her sonar equipment and exercises, and on 1 July sailed to screen air strikes and join in bombardments on Japan, patrolling in advance of the main body to ensure that planes returning from strikes were not leading Japanese aircraft to the carriers. On 9 August, during the bombardment of steel works at Kamaishi, she sank two enemy luggers by gunfire. She continued to cruise off Japan with the carrier until 15 September, when she entered Tokyo Bay to replenish. On 1 October she sailed to take on passengers at Okinawa, with whom she arrived at Long Beach 21 October 1945. She was decommissioned and placed in reserve 31 May 1946.

==== Korean War ====
With the expansion of the fleet in the Korean War, Erben was recommissioned 19 May 1951, and sailed from Long Beach, her home port, 27 August for Yokosuka. At once she joined the destroyer screen protecting carriers of Task Force 77 from submarine attack. In late September and October, she bombarded shore targets in the Songjin-Chongjin area, disrupting enemy communications and supply routes, and on 9 October, rescuing a North Korean fleeing the Communists in a small boat. After joining in antisubmarine warfare exercises off Okinawa, she returned to screening duty, rescuing a downed pilot 2 December. She accompanied Manchester in a bombardment on Korea's west coast, then sailed to the east coast to provide close fire support for the fighting men ashore. She returned to San Diego 21 March 1952 for overhaul, and on 1 November sailed again for duty off Korea.

In addition to carrying out duties similar to those of her first Korean war tour, Erben visited Taiwan and Hong Kong, and operated with ships of the Royal Navy. She returned to San Diego 1 June 1953, and during the remaining 5 years of her active service made four more cruises to the Far East, serving on the Taiwan Patrol and operating with the carriers of the 7th Fleet. On 8 June 1957 she went underway for the Far East. On 14 June she arrive in Pearl Harbor and remained there until 16 June 1957, where she had some repairs done. On 23 June 1957 she arrived at Midway Island and from 29 June to 6 July she was ported in Yokosuka, Japan. On 6 July she arrived in Yokohama, Japan and remained there until 8 July. 13 July was spent in Naha, Okinawa and on 17 July, Kaohsiung, Taiwan. From 26 to 28 July, she anchored again in Kaohsiung, Taiwan and on 1 August 1957 harbored in Yokosuka, Japan. She was again decommissioned and placed in reserve 27 June 1958.

=== South Korean Navy ===
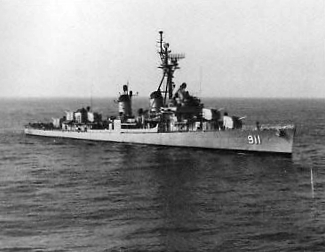
ROKS Chung Mu (DD-911), in 1982.

Erben was transferred to South Korea 16 May 1963, where she was renamed ROKS Chung Mu (DD-91). In 1979, the Republic of Korea Navy changed her Hull Number to 911. Starting in 1983, she served as a stationary training vessel. She was later broken up, with one of her 5-inch guns on display at the War Memorial of Korea in Seoul.

== Awards ==
Erben received six battle stars for her World War II service, and four for Korea.
