= Sarasota Paradise =

- Founded: November 19, 2022
- Dissolved: November 13, 2026
- Stadium: Premier Sports Campus; Lakewood Ranch, Florida
- Owners: Marco Assis and Marcus Walfridson
- Head Coach: Mika Elovaara
- League: USL League One
- Website: sarasotaparadise.us
Home colors	Away colors

Sarasota Paradise were an American soccer club based in Lakewood Ranch, Florida, competing in USL League One, the third tier of American soccer. The club began play in 2023 in USL League Two before joining League One in 2026. They played their home games at Premier Sports Campus at Lakewood Ranch.

Sarasota Paradise was principally owned by Marco Assis, CEO of Propio Language Services, with Marcus Walfridson as co-owner.

== History ==
Club branding was announced by founder Marcus Walfridson on January 14, 2023.

Sarasota Paradise made their USL League Two league debut on May 20, 2023, a 1–0 loss away at Miami AC. They made their home debut on June 3, 2023, defeating FC Miami City 2–1 in front of a crowd of nearly 500 spectators. The team finished 4th in the South Florida Division, 6 points behind division winners Weston FC. Their final home game of the season garnered 1,086 fans in attendance. Defender Hosei Kijima was selected to the 2023 USL League Two Team of the Year, drafted number 17 in the 2024 MLS Superdraft, and is now playing for MLS side St. Louis City SC.

In their second season, Sarasota Paradise secured their first South Florida Division Championship in club history with a 1-0 victory away against St. Petersburg FC. Sarasota Paradise remained undefeated at home throughout the season. Key results included a commanding 4-0 win over Miami AC, a thrilling 4-4 draw with Tampa Bay United, and a decisive 3-0 victory against Weston FC. This success earned the team a spot in the playoffs, where they faced Brave SC.

On February 19, 2025, Sarasota Paradise was announced as an expansion team in USL League One of the third division of the United States soccer league system to start play in the 2026 season. Garrett McLaughlin was announced as the first professional player signed in club history in November of that year.

On November 13, 2026, the club officially announced that they would be discontinuing operations and not participating in the 2027 League One season.

== Stadium ==
The club played at Premier Sports Campus at Lakewood Ranch.

== Players and staff ==
=== Technical staff ===
Position	Name
Head coach & Technical Director	Mika Elovaara
Assistant Coach	Trevor Sinclair
Assistant Coach	Mark Ward
Assistant Coach	Glodi Konga
Goalkeeping Coach	Mark MacPhee

=== Current roster ===
As of September 8, 2026

Note: Flags indicate national team as defined under FIFA eligibility rules; some limited exceptions apply. Players may hold more than one non-FIFA nationality.

No.	Pos.	Nation	Player
1	GK	USA	Alex Sutton
2	DF	USA	Roberto Burlew
3	DF	USA	Reid Valentine
4	DF	IRL	Declan Watters
5	DF	SWE	Amadeus Sögaard
7	FW	USA	Ethan Bryant
8	MF	USA	Aaron Walker
9	MF	USA	Jordan Bender
10	FW	USA	Matt Cence
11	FW	USA	Sean Karani
13	FW	USA	Tristan Fredrickson
14	MF	NOR	Jørgen Pettersen
16	MF	USA	Andres Rodriguez
17	FW	USA	Jonathan Bolanos
18	MF	USA	Brendan Krueger
19	FW	USA	Garrett McLaughlin

No.	Pos.	Nation	Player
20	MF	FIN	Maximus Tainio
22	DF	SWE	Hugo Bäckstrand
23	GK	GHA	Rockson Amedeka
24	DF	USA	Kisa Kiingi (on loan from Colorado Springs Switchbacks)
27	MF	ENG	Chandler O'Dwyer
28	MF	USA	Romain Gall
32	FW	ARG	Emiliano Terzaghi
36	DF	BRA	Anderson Rosa
46	MF	NOR	Sander Røed
50	FW	USA	Dominik Brulinski
51	DF	USA	Adam Kend
52	MF	USA	Kevin Sanchez
53	MF	USA	Eeli Elovaara
60	FW	USA	Michael McGurk
61	FW	USA	Joshua Spengler

Amateur agreement

== Year-by-year ==
Year	Division	League	Regular season	Playoffs	Open Cup	Average Attendance
2023	4	USL League Two	4th, South Florida	Did not qualify	Did not qualify	426
2024	4	USL League Two	1st, South Florida	Conference Quarter Finals	Did qualify	521
2025	4	USL League Two	1st, South Florida	Conference Semi Finals	First Round	1,348
2026	3	USL League One	N/A	N/A	Did not qualify	1,740

== Honors ==
League

- USL League Two South Florida Conference
  - Winner (1): 2024

=== Player ===
Year	Player	Country	Pos	Honor
2023	Hosei Kijima	JPN	D	Team of the Year
