= Johann Balthasar Erben =

German Kapellmeister and composer

Johann Balthasar Erben (1626 – 1686) was a German Kapellmeister and composer.

== Life ==
Born in Danzig, Erben was the son of a shipping entrepreneur. According to Johann Mattheson, he taught music to the only slightly younger Christoph Bernhard. In 1652, he unsuccessfully applied for the position of Kapellmeister at the Marienkirche. However, the City Council of Gdansk financed a trip of several years to extend his education. First, he spent several weeks at the Reichstag in Regensburg, where he met Johann Jacob Froberger. Further stops on his journey were Nuremberg, Würzburg, Heidelberg, Frankfurt, Bonn, Cologne, Düsseldorf, Antwerp, Brussels, France, and Italy. In 1658, he applied again for the position of a chapel master at the Marienkirche, which became vacant because of the departure of Kaspar Förster. On 14 February, he was appointed to the post, which he held until his death in 1686 in Danzig. Erben was married twice.
