= Henry Erben =

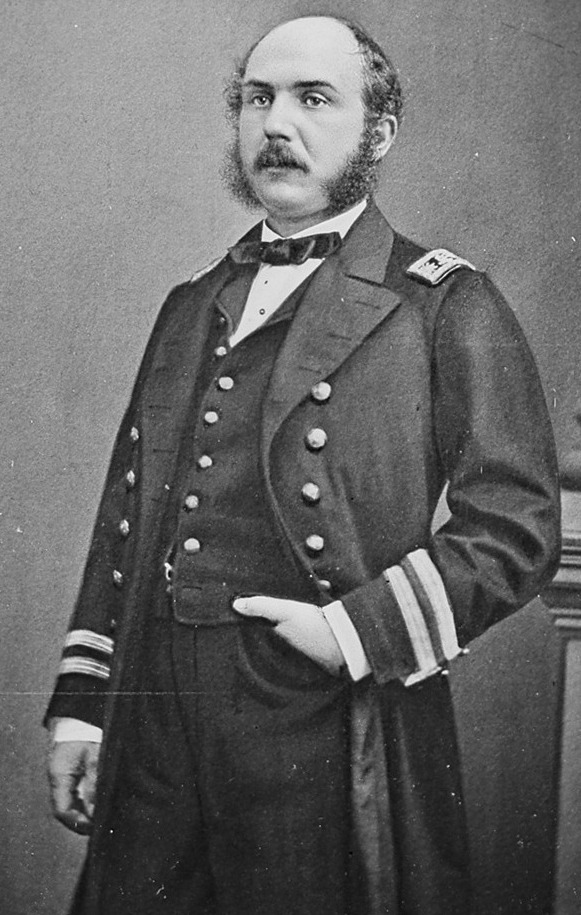
- Erben, c. 1860–1865
- Born: 5 September 1832; New York City, U.S.
- Died: 23 October 1909 (aged 77); New York City, U.S.
- Military career
- Allegiance: United States of America
- Branch: United States Navy
- Service years: 1848–1894, 1898
- Rank: Rear admiral
- Commands: USS St. Louis; USS Sumter; USS Tunxis; USS Pinola; USS Tuscarora; European Station; Patrol Fleet
- Conflicts: American Civil War; Spanish–American War

Signature
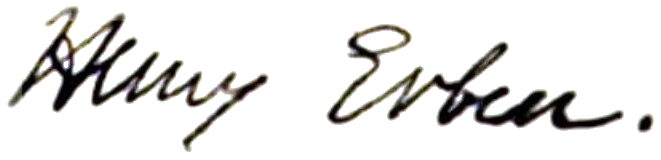

Henry Erben (5 September 1832 – 23 October 1909) was a rear admiral of the United States Navy, who served in the American Civil War and the Spanish–American War. His father, also named Henry Erben (1800–1884), was a prominent builder of pipe organs.

== Biography ==
Erben was born in New York City, and he entered the Navy as a midshipman on 17 June 1848. He graduated from the United States Naval Academy and was promoted to passed midshipman on 12 June 1855, to master on 16 September 1855, and to lieutenant on 27 December 1856.

At the outbreak of the Civil War he was serving aboard the store ship Supply, which arrived at Pensacola, Florida, on 10 January 1861, the day the state declared its secession from the Union, and as the Navy Yard there was captured by state forces. Union forces under Lieutenant Adam J. Slemmer still held Fort Pickens, and the next day Erben and men from Supply broke into Fort McRee, and destroyed some 20,000 pounds of gunpowder and spiked all of the guns. In April Erben reported aboard Powhatan, and was ordered to the Mississippi Flotilla on 5 September 1861. There he commanded the ironclad St. Louis from April to June 1862, and the Sumter from June to July 1862. He was promoted to lieutenant commander on 16 July 1862. He then served with the naval howitzer battery which served with the Army during the Antietam campaign in September 1862.

He commanded the ill-fated monitor Tunxis from her commissioning in July 1864 until September, then the gunboat Pinola in the 2nd Division of the West Gulf Blockading Squadron under Captain George F. Emmons in the Gulf of Mexico. On 2 February 1865 he detained the schooner Ben Willis, sailing under British colors, with a cargo of bales of cotton. Suspecting her to be a blockade runner, Erben sent her in to New Orleans. Soon after, on 18 February 1865, boats from Pinola entered Pass Cavallo, Texas, and cut out the 70-ton schooner Anna Dale, which was armed with a 12-pounder Dahlgren howitzer and plentiful small arms. Attempting to sail her out in the dark the schooner grounded, so the guns were removed, and the schooner burnt. Nine crewmen were taken prisoner, one being her commander Joseph F. Stevenson, who claimed to be a lieutenant of the Confederate Navy, but was suspected by Erben of being a privateer.

Erben was promoted to commander on 6 May 1868 and in late 1874 took over command of the USS Tuscarora from George Belknap. As part of this command the ship took soundings of the ocean bottom and discovered a seamount which became known as the Erben seamount, named after its commander.

Erben was promoted to captain on 1 November 1879 and served as the superintendent of the New York Nautical School (now the State University of New York Maritime College) from 1879 to 1882.

Promoted to commodore on 3 April 1892, he served as the commandant of the New York Navy Yard until May 1893, and was then appointed commander-in-chief of the European Station, serving from June 1893 until August 1894, and receiving promotion to rear admiral on 31 July 1894.

Rear Admiral Erben retired on 6 September 1894, but returned to active duty between April and July 1898 when he was placed in command of the Patrol Fleet, which guarded the coast of the United States from Galveston, Texas, to Bar Harbor, Maine, during the Spanish–American War. Erben was based at New York City, while his command consisted primarily of eight old iron monitors stationed at various ports.

Rear Admiral Erben died in New York City in 1909.

== Namesake ==
The Fletcher-class destroyer USS Erben (DD-631) (1943–1958) was named in his honor.

== Family ==
His father, also named Henry Erben (born in New York City in 1800; died there in 1884), was an organ builder, apprenticed in 1818 to Thomas Hall, an organ builder. The admiral's grandfather Peter Erben (born in Philadelphia in 1771; died in New York City in 1863) was an organist. After the death of his father, who was one of the early German settlers in Pennsylvania, Peter moved to New York City, where he became an organ builder, and was also organist in Trinity parish from 1807 until 1839.

== Article by Capt. John M. Ellicott, USN (Ret.), '83 ==
Seadog vs. Scholar - The Erben - Mahan Feud
