= Hermann Erben =

20th-century Austrian physician with close connections to Nazi Germany

Hermann Erben (15 November 1897 – 1985) was an Austrian physician who served in the German military intelligence. He is also known as a friend of Errol Flynn.

== Biography ==
Hermann Erben was born in Vienna as the son of a Jewish family. He served from 1916–1918 as a soldier of the Austro-Hungarian monarchy in World War I. He then studied medicine at the University of Vienna, and got a scholarship in the USA (1924), where he immediately applied for, and was granted citizenship of the United States as late as 1930.

Due to US citizenship requirements, he had to return to Austria, where he finished his medical studies in 1926 and was awarded the degree of Dr. Med. in 1929. He then returned to the US (1930).

He had an interesting career as a physician between 1930 and 1933, based at the Pacific Institute for Tropical Medicine in San Francisco, including a research visit to South America (1930–1931), work as a ship's doctor (1931–1932) and research in Papua New Guinea (1932–1933).

He returned to Vienna at the beginning of 1934. In 1935, he (initially) accompanied Max Reisch during Reisch's famous first circumnavigation of the earth by car, but left the expedition after its first leg (Vienna to Calicut), due to severe quarrels with Max Reisch and the other participant, Helmuth Hahmann.

On returning from Papua New Guinea in 1933, he met Errol Flynn, with whom he established a close friendship, and with whom he later witnessed the 1937 Spanish Civil War as a physician. There he started his Nazi connections, by pretending to be a member of the Spanish Republicans, but transferring all information obtained there to the German Gestapo.

=== Nazi connections ===
He joined the Nazi Party in 1938, immediately after the Anschluss of Austria. In 1946, he confessed to a US Military Committee in Shanghai that he had worked for the Ehrhardt Bureau of the Abwehr (German Military Intelligence) from 1941 to 1945, and that he had been a spy inside an internment camp in the Far East for over two years.

At one time, the American security service regarded him as one of the three most dangerous operatives in Mexico.

=== Further life ===
Hermann F. Erben lived and worked after World War II as a physician in the US, and returned after his retirement in 1977 to Vienna, where he lived until his death in 1985.

== Sources ==
- US Government Accountability Office (GAO, 1940): B-8084, JANUARY 22, 1940, 19 COMP. GEN. 671 (lengthy document on Hermann F. Erben as American seaman, discussing his entitlement for transportation back to the US from Valparaíso)
- Josef Fegerl (ed., 1985): Errol Flynn, Dr. Hermann F. Erben: a friendship of two adventurers, 1933-1940: a documentation, Vienna 1985: Fegerl self-published
- Rudolf Stoiber (1989): Der Spion der Hitler sein wollte - Das Leben des Dr. med. Hermann F. Erben alias Hadschi Dr. Muhammed Ali Kusumandilaga alias August J. Karg alias "Silberfuchs" alias Alois Ecker alias "A-105" (title English: "The spy who wanted to be Hitler. The life of Dr. med. Hermann F. Erben, alias ..."), Hamburg 1989: Zsolnay publishers, ISBN 3-55204-129-X.
