= Dallas Odle =

American soccer player (born 2001)

Personal information
- Full name: Dallas Odle
- Date of birth: August 5, 2001 (age 25)
- Place of birth: Manhattan, Kansas, United States
- Height: 1.83 m (6 ft 0 in)
- Position: Goalkeeper

Youth career
- 2015–2017: Real Salt Lake
- 2017–2020: San Jose Earthquakes
- 2020–2021: C. D. Almuñecar City

Senior career*
| Years | Team | Apps | (Gls) |
| 2020–2021 | C. D. Almuñecar City | 14 | (0) |
| 2022–2023 | FC Tulsa | 1 | (0) |
| 2024–2025 | New York Red Bulls II | 2 | (0) |
| 2025 | Monterey Bay FC | 0 | (0) |
- * Club domestic league appearances and goals as of August 18, 2025

Dallas Odle (born August 5, 2001) is an American soccer player who plays as a goalkeeper.

== Club career ==
=== Early career ===
Born in Manhattan, Kansas, Odle grew up in Scottsdale, Arizona and began his youth career with Real Salt Lake’s Academy system where he played from 2015 to 2017. His family then moved to Cupertino, California, and Odle joined San Jose Earthquakes Academy program. Between his time with the two MLS Academies, Odle moved up from U15 to the U19 teams.

After initially attending Cal State Bakersfield to play college soccer, Odle’s freshman season was impacted by COVID-19, and he went abroad to play as an amateur inside one of the top private residential Academies in the world, FC Málaga City. He played for CD Almuñécar City senior team, the second-highest team in the FC Málaga City Academy structure, making 14 starts. He allowed only 15 goals in those 14 starts with seven clean sheets in the Divisiones Regionales de Fútbol league in Spain.

=== FC Tulsa ===
On March 11, 2022, Odle signed with USL Championship side FC Tulsa. He made his debut with the club on October 15, 2022, in a match against Memphis 901 FC, where he totaled six saves.

=== New York Red Bulls II ===
On March 15, 2024, Odle signed an MLS NEXT Pro contract for the 2024 season with New York Red Bulls II. On March 29, 2024, Odle made his debut for New York, appearing as a starter in a 3–2 victory over FC Cincinnati 2.

== Career statistics ==
As of match played October 6, 2024

Appearances and goals by club, season and competition
| Club | Season | League | | | U.S. Open Cup | | Continental | | Other | | Total | |
| Club | Season | Division | Apps | Goals | Apps | Goals | Apps | Goals | Apps | Goals | Apps | Goals |
|---|---|---|---|---|---|---|---|---|---|---|---|---|
| FC Tulsa | 2022 | USL Championship | 1 | 0 | 0 | 0 | — | | 0 | 0 | 1 | 0 |
| FC Tulsa | 2023 | USL Championship | 0 | 0 | 0 | 0 | — | | 0 | 0 | 0 | 0 |
| FC Tulsa | Total | | 1 | 0 | 0 | 0 | — | | 0 | 0 | 1 | 0 |
| New York Red Bulls II | 2024 | MLS Next Pro | 2 | 0 | 1 | 0 | — | | 0 | 0 | 3 | 0 |
| Monterey Bay FC | 2025 | USL Championship | 0 | 0 | 0 | 0 | — | | 0 | 0 | 0 | 0 |
| Career total | | | 3 | 0 | 1 | 0 | — | | 0 | 0 | 4 | 0 |
