= Andrés Rodríguez Erben =

Paraguayan bishop

Andrés Rodríguez Erben is an Anglican Auxiliary Bishop of Paraguay.
