= 2026 Athletic Club Boise season =

Athletic Club Boise
- Owners: Brad Stith, Steve Patterson, David Wali and Bill Taylor
- Head coach: Nate Miller
- Stadium: Stadium at Expo Idaho
- USL League One: 3rd
- U.S. Open Cup: NA
- USL Cup: Group Stage
- USL Playoffs: Runners Up
- Top goalscorer: League: (Ukraine) Denys Kostyshyn (South Africa) Tumi Moshobane (8 Goals Each); All: (South Africa) Tumi Moshobane (10 Goals)
- Highest home attendance: 7,254 vs AV Alta FC October 17; 8,003 vs Chattanooga Red Wolves SC Playoffs November 7
- Lowest home attendance: 7,201 vs Fort Wayne FC May 23, vs Forward Madison FC August 8
- Average home league attendance: 7,216, with USL Cup 7,217, With USL Cup and Playoffs 7,276, With Playoffs but not USL Cup 7,282
- Biggest win: Athletic Club Boise 4–0 Westchester SC April 18
- Biggest defeat: Forward Madison FC 5–1 Athletic Club Boise June 13

The 2026 Athletic Club Boise season was the inaugural season in the club's existence as well as their first in USL League One, the third-tier of American soccer. The club cannot participate in the US Open Cup because of rule changes.

== Players and staff ==
=== Current roster ===
As of May 5, 2026

Note: Flags indicate national team as defined under FIFA eligibility rules; some limited exceptions apply. Players may hold more than one non-FIFA nationality.

No.	Pos.	Nation	Player
1	GK	GHA	Joseph Andema
2	DF	USA	Jonathan Ricketts
3	DF	USA	Keegan Oyler
4	DF	USA	Benian Yao
5	DF	SEN	Moussa Ndiaye
6	MF	ENG	Charlie Adams
7	MF	USA	Blake Bodily
8	MF	USA	Dominic Gasso
9	FW	BRA	Luan Brito
10	MF	UKR	Denys Kostyshyn
11	MF	RSA	Tumi Moshobane

No.	Pos.	Nation	Player
14	MF	USA	Nick Moon
16	DF	AUT	Jacob Crull
17	FW	CAN	Joseph Hanson
18	GK	USA	Jonathan Kliewer
22	FW	CMR	Thomas Amang
23	FW	USA	Omar Yehya
25	DF	USA	Jake Dengler
27	MF	USA	Jackson Stephens
33	DF	USA	Hayden Sargis
66	MF	KEN	Philip Mayaka
99	GK	USA	Jared Mazzola

1. USL Academy Contract

== Transfers ==
=== In ===
Date	Position	Number	Name	from	Type	Fee	Ref.
January 6, 2026	MF	7	(United States) Blake Bodily	(United States) Tampa Bay Rowdies	Signing	NA	
January 7, 2026	MF	6	(England) Charlie Adams	(United States) Colorado Springs Switchbacks	Signing	NA	
January 8, 2026	DF	2	(United States) Jonathan Ricketts	(United States) Miami FC	Signing	NA	
January 9, 2026	MF	14	(United States) Nick Moon	(United States) Tampa Bay Rowdies	Signing	NA	
January 10, 2026	DF	25	(United States) Jake Dengler	(United States) FC Naples	Signing	NA	
January 12, 2026	DF	16	(Austria) Jacob Crull	(United States) Forward Madison FC	Signing	NA	
January 13, 2026	GK	13	(United States) Javier Garcia	(United States) Texoma FC	Signing	NA	
January 14, 2026	FW	23	(United States) Omar Yehya	(United States) Utah Valley Wolverines	Signing	NA	
January 15, 2026	MF	11	(South Africa) Tumi Moshobane	(United States) Charlotte Independence	Signing	NA	
January 16, 2026	MF	66	(Kenya) Philip Mayaka	(United States) Huntsville City FC	Signing	NA	
January 19, 2026	MF	10	(Ukraine) Denys Kostyshyn	(Kosovo) Drita	Signing	NA	
January 21, 2026	DF	4	(United States) Benian Yao	(United States) UNC Asheville Bulldogs	Signing	NA	
January 27, 2026	MF	8	(United States) Dominic Gasso	(United States) Detroit City FC	Signing	NA	
February 13, 2026	GK	1	(Ghana) Joseph Andema	(United States) Clemson Tigers	Signing	NA	
February 14, 2026	FW	9	(Brazil) Luan Brito	(Brazil) Fluminense U23s	Signing	NA	
February 25, 2026	DF	3	(United States) Keegan Oyler	(United States) Utah Valley Wolverines	Signing	NA	
March 3, 2026	DF	5	(Senegal) Moussa Ndiaye	(United States) Vermont Green FC	Signing	NA	
March 4, 2026	DF	33	(United States) Hayden Sargis	(United States) Orlando City B	Signing	NA	
March 5, 2026	MF	27	(United States) Jackson Stephens	(United States) Austin FC II	Academy Contract	NA	
March 6, 2026	FW	17	(Canada) Joseph Hanson	(Republic of Ireland) Treaty United	Signing	NA	
March 7, 2026	GK	18	(United States) Jonathan Kliewer	(United States) Missouri State Bears	Signing	NA	
March 19, 2026	FW	22	(Cameroon) Thomas Amang	(United States) New Mexico United	Signing	NA	
May 5, 2026	GK	99	(United States) Jared Mazzola	(United States) Las Vegas Lights FC	Loan	NA	
June 5, 2026	DF	15	(Ghana) Josh Yaro	(United States) St. Louis City SC	Loan	NA	
June 19, 2026	MF		(Ghana) Grayson Carter	(United States) Real Salt Lake Academy	Academy Contract	NA	
July 20, 2026	FW	36	(Spain) Jesús Barea	(United States) Real Monarchs	Transfer	NA	

=== Out ===
Date	Position	Number	Name	to	Type	Fee	Ref.
May 6, 2026	GK	13	(United States) Javier Garcia	(United States) New York Cosmos	Transfer	NA	

=== Loaned Out ===
Date	Position	Number	Name	to	Loaned Until	Ref.
August 23, 2026	DF	33	(United States) Hayden Sargis	(United States) Real Monarchs	End of Season	

== Non-competitive fixtures ==
=== Friendlies ===
February 28	Oakland Roots SC	v	Athletic Club Boise
				Attendance: Behind Closed Doors

August 12 Midseason Friendly	Athletic Club Boise	2–0	(Costa Rica) Sporting FC	Garden City, Idaho
	Barea 64'; Moshobane 73'			Stadium: Stadium at Expo Idaho; Attendance: 7,157

September 30 Midseason Friendly	Athletic Club Boise	3–1	(Mexico) Cancún FC	Garden City, Idaho
7:00 PM MDT	Yeyha 46'; Villa 86'		Goal	Stadium: Stadium at Expo Idaho

== Competitive fixtures ==
=== Regular Season ===
March 7 1	Sarasota Paradise	0–1	Athletic Club Boise	Lakewood Ranch, Florida
5:30 PM MST	Bolanos (yellow card) 20'	Report	Dengler (yellow card) 35'; Kostyshyn 75'	Stadium: Premier Sports Campus; Attendance: 2,791; Referee: Matthew Thompson

March 22 2	Union Omaha	3–2	Athletic Club Boise	Omaha, Nebraska
3:00 PM MST	Mayaka 22' (o.g.); Ors (yellow card) 55'; Gutierrez 73', 84'; Guediri (yellow card) 86'; Nuhu (yellow card) 90+1'; Candela (yellow card) 90+4'	Report	Ndiaye (yellow card) 21'; Brito 28' (pen.); Mayaka (yellow card) 70' (goal) 81'	Stadium: Morrison Stadium; Attendance: 1,732; Referee: Mark Verso

March 28 3	South Georgia Tormenta FC	v	Athletic Club Boise	Statesboro, Georgia
4:30 PM MST				Stadium: Tormenta Stadium
Note: Game cancelled following South Georgia Tormenta FC's withdrawal from USL League One.

April 4 4	Athletic Club Boise	1–1	Spokane Velocity	Garden City, Idaho
7:00 PM MST	Moon 51'; Mayaka (yellow card) 80'	Report	Gallardo 21'; Lewis (yellow card) 29'; Vinyals (yellow card) 32'; Booth (yellow card) 36'; Peláez (yellow card) 44'; Margvelashvili (yellow card) 83'; Hernández (yellow card) 89'	Stadium: Stadium at Expo Idaho; Attendance: 7,211; Referee: Corbyn May

April 11 5	AV Alta FC	2–2	Athletic Club Boise	Lancaster, California
8:30 PM MST	Aoumaich 23'; Lay (yellow card) 48'; Ibarra (yellow card) 56'; Desdunes 79'; Pehlivanov (yellow card) 81'	Report	Kostyshyn 14' (yellow card) 35'; Dengler (yellow card) 56'; Moon 59'; Mayaka (yellow card) 82'; Amang (yellow card) 83'	Stadium: Lancaster Municipal Stadium; Attendance: 3,209; Referee: Steven Cardozo

April 18 6	Athletic Club Boise	4–0	Westchester SC	Garden City, Idaho
7:00 PM MST	Moshobane 16'; Kostyshyn 21', 54'; Miller (yellow card) 52'; Brito 69'; Dengler (yellow card) 76'	Report	Timchenko (yellow card) 26'; Mackic (yellow card) 34'; Blommestijn (yellow card) 76'	Stadium: Stadium at Expo Idaho; Attendance: 7,204; Referee: Servando Berna Rico

May 2 7	Athletic Club Boise	2–1	Chattanooga Red Wolves SC	Garden City, Idaho
7:00 PM MST	Moshobane 3'; Miller (yellow card) 23'; Gómez 37' (o.g.); Kliewer (yellow card) 90+2'	Report	Adewole (yellow card) 30'; Hernandez 56'; Wessels (yellow card) 61'	Stadium: Stadium at Expo Idaho; Attendance: 7,227; Referee: Kalilou Jarju

May 6 8	Charlotte Independence	1–0	Athletic Club Boise	Charlotte, North Carolina
5:30 PM MST	Amaya (yellow card) 79'; Álvarez 81'; Lyons (yellow card) 90+2'	Report	Kliewer (yellow card) 59'; Moon (yellow card) 66'; Bodily (yellow card) 77'	Stadium: American Legion Memorial Stadium; Attendance: 592; Referee: Alejo Calume

May 13 9	Athletic Club Boise	2–0	FC Naples	Garden City, Idaho
7:00 PM MST	Amang 8'; Ricketts (yellow card) 62'; Yehya (yellow card) 69'; Gasso (yellow card) 75'; Rose 81' (o.g.); Crull (yellow card) 87'	Report	O'Connor (yellow card) 11'; Ferrín (yellow card) 33'; Torrellas (yellow card) 50'; Cisneros (yellow card) 71'	Stadium: Stadium at Expo Idaho; Attendance: 7,203; Referee: Deny Kulasinac

May 23 10	Athletic Club Boise	1–3	Fort Wayne FC	Garden City, Idaho
7:00 PM MST	Kostyshyn (yellow card) 48'; Ndiaye (yellow card) 57'; Gasso 59'; Yeyha (yellow card) 90+5'	Report	Ricol 9', 83'; Jordan (yellow card) 18'; Schipmann (yellow card) 20'; Healy 58'; Rempel (yellow card) 76'	Stadium: Stadium at Expo Idaho; Attendance: 7,201; Referee: Justin St. Pierre

May 27 11	Athletic Club Boise	0–2	Sarasota Paradise	Garden City, Idaho
7:00 PM MST	Amang (yellow card) 45'	Report	O'Dwyer 55'; McLaughlin 60'; Linderoth (yellow card) 81'	Stadium: Stadium at Expo Idaho; Attendance: 7,202; Referee: Steven Cardozo

May 30 12	Richmond Kickers	2–2	Athletic Club Boise	Richmond, Virginia
5:00 PM MST	Amer 22'; Dourado (yellow card) 24' (goal) 51'; Espinal (yellow card) 57'; Layton (yellow card) 69'; Anderson (yellow card) 72'; Sasankhah (yellow card) 82'	Report	Crull (yellow card) 33'; Bodily (yellow card) 75'; Kostyshyn 79'; Moon 86'	Stadium: City Stadium; Attendance: 4,207; Referee: Stephen Foster

June 10 13	Athletic Club Boise	2–1	Richmond Kickers	Garden City, Idaho
7:30 PM MST	Moshobane 3'; Mayaka (yellow card) 22'; Moon 42' (yellow card) 44' (yellow-red card) 45+1'; Miller (yellow card) 45+3'; Kliewer (yellow card) 89'	Report	Vinberg (yellow card) 19'; Amer (yellow card) 32'; Espinal (yellow card) 54'; Seufert 55' (yellow card) 56'; Kirkland (yellow card) 80'; Layton (yellow card) 82'	Stadium: Stadium at Expo Idaho; Attendance: 7,211; Referee: Atahan Yaya

June 13 14	Forward Madison FC	5–1	Athletic Club Boise	Madison, Wisconsin
6:00 PM MST	Gebhard 39'; Bolma (yellow card) 49'; Kanyane (yellow card) 53'; Karamoko 66'; Carmichael (yellow card) 70' (goal) 71'; Torres 75'; Toure 90+1'; Segbers (yellow card) 90+3'	Report	Ricketts (yellow card) 43'; Brito 50'	Stadium: Breese Stevens Field; Attendance: 3,393; Referee: Carlos Rodriguez

June 20 15	Athletic Club Boise	1–0	Union Omaha	Garden City, Idaho
7:30 PM MST	Adams (yellow card) 45+1'; Moshobane 69'; Kostyshyn (yellow card) 90+4'	Report	Tekiela (yellow card) 49'; Cabral (yellow card) 58'; Kallman (yellow card) 71'	Stadium: Stadium at Expo Idaho; Attendance: 7,247; Referee: Calin Radosav

July 2 16	Athletic Club Boise	1–2	One Knoxville SC	Garden City, Idaho
7:30 PM MST	Moon 22'; Kostyshyn (yellow card) 31'; Mayaka (yellow card) 90'	Report	Tiao (yellow card) 24'; McRobb 44'; Caputo (yellow card) 73'; McLeod (yellow card) 76'; Baker 81'; Skelton (yellow card) 89'	Stadium: Stadium at Expo Idaho; Attendance: 7,223; Referee: Benjamin Meyer

July 5 17	Westchester SC	0–1	Athletic Club Boise	Mount Vernon, New York
5:00 PM MST	Armas (yellow card) 26'; Evans (yellow card) 54'; Jennings (yellow card) 86'; Pierre (yellow card) 89'	Report	Gasso (yellow card) 14'; Pierre 62' (o.g.); Hanson (yellow card) 78'	Stadium: The Stadium at Memorial Field; Attendance: 1,776; Referee: Stephen Foster

July 17 18	Athletic Club Boise	2–1	Portland Hearts of Pine	Garden City, Idaho
7:30 PM MST	Bodily 83'; Miller (yellow card) 90+3'; Amang (yellow card) 90+3' (goal) 90+10'	Report	Green (yellow card) 45+1'; Sing 78'; Poon-Angeron (yellow card) 89'	Stadium: Stadium at Expo Idaho; Attendance: 7,212; Referee: Robert Vincze

July 25 19	New York Cosmos	1–2	Athletic Club Boise	Paterson, New Jersey
5:00 PM MST	Marsh (yellow card) 23'; Chavez (yellow card) 52'; Guenzatti 90+5'	Report	Bodily 54' (pen.); Crull 60'; Gasso (yellow card) 74'	Stadium: Hinchliffe Stadium; Attendance: 2,126; Referee: Braeden Frey

July 29 20	Greenville Triumph SC	3–2	Athletic Club Boise	Mauldin, South Carolina
5:00 PM MST	Meek 13'; Evans 25' (yellow card) 89'; Liadi 61'; Herrera (yellow card) 90+5'	Report	Barea 5'; Kostyshyn 15'; Yehya (yellow card) 33'; Ndiaye (yellow card) 64'; Amang (yellow card) 88'	Stadium: GE Vernova Park; Attendance: 2,205; Referee: Izlen Peksenar

August 1 21	Athletic Club Boise	0–0	Corpus Christi FC	Garden City, Idaho
7:30 PM MST	Mayaka (yellow card) 37'; Miller (yellow card) 64'	Report	Keaney (yellow card) 13'; Talbot (yellow card) 15'; Bowen (yellow card) 21'; McCready (yellow card) 45+1'; Roscoe (yellow card) 65'; Dietrich (yellow card) 90+4'	Stadium: Stadium at Expo Idaho; Attendance: 7,204; Referee: Christopher Calderon

August 8 22	Athletic Club Boise	2–1	Forward Madison FC	Garden City, Idaho
7:30 PM MST	Miller (yellow card) 39'; Mayaka 45+5' (yellow card) 90+5'; Barea (yellow card) 45+9'; Bodily (yellow card) 78' (goal) 87'; Kostyshyn (yellow card) 90'; Amang (yellow card) 90+1'	Report	Munjoma (yellow card) 31'; Edwards 83'; Toure (yellow card) 90+3' (red card) 90+3'	Stadium: Stadium at Expo Idaho; Attendance: 7,201; Referee: John Matto

August 15 23	Athletic Club Boise	v	South Georgia Tormenta FC	Garden City, Idaho
7:30 PM MST				Stadium: Stadium at Expo Idaho
Note: Game cancelled following South Georgia Tormenta FC's withdrawal from USL League One.

August 22 24	One Knoxville SC	2–2	Athletic Club Boise	Knoxville, Tennessee
5:30 PM MST	Gill 17' (pen.); Dengler 28' (o.g.); Uderitz (yellow card) 56'; Fernandez (yellow card) 90'; Murphy (yellow card) 90+3'	Report	Moshobane 31'; Ricketts (yellow card) 71' (goal) 83'; Mayaka (yellow card) 90+3'	Stadium: Covenant Health Park; Attendance: 4,672; Referee: Mario Maric

August 29 25	Chattanooga Red Wolves SC	2–3	Athletic Club Boise	East Ridge, Tennessee
5:00 PM MST	Kelly (yellow card) 38'; Hernandez 51' (pen.); Lelin 56'; Ayimbila (yellow card) 85'; Knapp (yellow card) 87'; Ramos (yellow card) 90+5'	Report	Moshobane 26' (yellow card) 45+1'; Crull (yellow card) 37'; Moon 71'; Amang 81'	Stadium: CHI Memorial Stadium; Attendance: 1,678; Referee: Drew Klemp

September 5 26	FC Naples	0–2	Athletic Club Boise	Naples, Florida
5:30 PM MST	Garcia (yellow card) 36' (yellow-red card) 68'; Gordon (yellow card) 65'	Report	Moon 16'; Kostyshyn 51'; Mayaka (yellow card) 57'; Gasso (yellow card) 63'; Dengler (yellow card) 86'	Stadium: Paradise Coast Sports Complex; Attendance: 1,831; Referee: Erick Lezama

September 11 27	Athletic Club Boise	2–1	New York Cosmos	Garden City, Idaho
4:00 PM MST	Bodily 10'; Moshobane 81'; Brito (yellow card) 84'	Report	Holt (yellow card) 39'; Cabrera (yellow card) 72'; Guenzatti 90+4'	Stadium: Stadium at Expo Idaho; Attendance: 7,232; Referee: Trevor Wiseman

September 16 28	Athletic Club Boise	1–1	Charlotte Independence	Garden City, Idaho
7:00 PM MST	Gasso (yellow card) 33'; Kostyshyn 58'	Report	Coulibaly (yellow card) 4' (yellow-red card) 11'; Manin 62'	Stadium: Stadium at Expo Idaho; Attendance: 7,207; Referee: Rafael Bonilla

September 20 29	Spokane Velocity	2–2	Athletic Club Boise	Spokane, Washington
5:00 PM MST	Gil 48'; Waldeck 50'; Opara (yellow card) 62'; Speilman (yellow card) 88'	Report	Barea 29' (pen.), 45+1'; Crull (yellow card) 68'	Stadium: One Spokane Stadium; Attendance: 2,677; Referee: Jaclyn Metz

September 26 30	Corpus Christi FC	2–1	Athletic Club Boise	Corpus Christi, Texas
5:30 PM MST	Bowen 22'; Roscoe (yellow card) 60'; Vasic (yellow card) 83'; Barganski (yellow card) 90+3'; Keaney 90+7'	Report	Barea (yellow card) 57'; Mayaka (yellow card) 58'; Amang 63'; Yehya (yellow card) 90+1'	Stadium: Cabaniss Athletic Complex; Attendance: 1,699; Referee: Igor Bych

October 3 31	Athletic Club Boise	1–0	Greenville Triumph SC	Garden City, Idaho
7:00 PM MST	Yaro 11'; Miller (yellow card) 20' (yellow-red card) 21'; Barea (red card) 45+6'; Kliewer (yellow card) 55'; Ricketts (yellow card) 67'	Report	Robles (yellow card) 34'; Herrera (yellow card) 90+2'	Stadium: Stadium at Expo Idaho; Attendance: 7,219; Referee: Cristian Campo Hernández

October 10 32	Portland Hearts of Pine	1–2	Athletic Club Boise	Portland, Maine
3:00 PM MST	Letayf (yellow card) 41'; Gonzalez 74'; Green (yellow card) 82'	Report	Moshobane 54'; Amang 90+4' (yellow card) 90+5'	Stadium: Fitzpatrick Stadium; Attendance: 6,318; Referee: Nicholas Strednak

October 17 33	Athletic Club Boise	2–1	AV Alta FC	Garden City, Idaho
7:00 PM MST	Barea 16', 74'; Gasso (yellow card) 41'; Kostyshyn (yellow card) 58'; Ndiaye (yellow card) 59'; Kliewer (yellow card) 90+1'; Crull (yellow card) 90+3'	Report	Pajaro (yellow card) 29'; Bahena (yellow card) 56'; Kleiban (yellow card) 62'; Smith (yellow card) 75'; Aoumaich 78'; Ibarra (yellow card) 90+4'; Desdunes (yellow card) 90+5'; Higareda (yellow card) 90+8'	Stadium: Stadium at Expo Idaho; Attendance: 7,254; Referee: Alex Beehler

October 24 34	Fort Wayne FC	0–2	Athletic Club Boise	Fort Wayne, Indiana
5:30 PM MST	Awoudor (yellow card) 53'; Vukovic (yellow card) 67' (yellow-red card) 70'	Report	Moon (yellow card) 10'; Mayaka (yellow card) 13'; Barea 39'; Kliewer (yellow card) 79'; Amang 90+1'	Stadium: Ruoff Mortgage Stadium; Attendance: 4,099; Referee: Muhammad Hassan

=== Playoffs ===
November 1 Quarterfinals	Athletic Club Boise	2–0	One Knoxville SC	Garden City, Idaho
6:00 PM MST	Moshobane 37'; Kostyshyn (yellow card) 54'; Bodily (yellow card) 76'; Barea 90+2'	Report	Gøling (yellow card) 22'; Baker (yellow card) 58'	Stadium: Stadium at Expo Idaho; Attendance: 7,613; Referee: Muhammad Kaleia

November 7 Semifinals	Athletic Club Boise	1–0 (a.e.t.)	Chattanooga Red Wolves SC	Garden City, Idaho
6:00 PM MST	Dengler (yellow card) 31'; Miller (yellow card) 40'; Barea 114'; Kliewer (yellow card) 116'	Report	Clapier (yellow card) 51'; Mackenzie (yellow card) 90+2'; Hallenberger (yellow card) 98'; Vaughan (yellow card) 105+3'; Jérez (yellow card) 120+2'	Stadium: Stadium at Expo Idaho; Attendance: 8,003; Referee: Abdou Ndiaye

November 14 USL League One Final	Charlotte Independence	4–2	Athletic Club Boise	Matthews, North Carolina
5:30 PM MST	Skinner (yellow card) 42' (goal) 84'; Marou 58', 87' (yellow card) 70'; Romero (yellow card) 90+10'	Report	Moshobane 33'; Mayaka (yellow card) 41'; Dengler (yellow card) 63'; Manin 76' (o.g.); Amang (yellow card) 90+6'	Stadium: Sportsplex at Matthews; Attendance: 3,326; Referee: Matthew Thompson

=== USL Cup ===
April 25 Group Stage	Las Vegas Lights FC	1–1 (2–4 p)	Athletic Club Boise	Las Vegas, Nevada
8:30 PM MST	Scott (yellow card) 27'; Pickering 61'; Ybarra (yellow card) 87'	Report	Amang (yellow card) 5'; Oyler 64'	Stadium: Cashman Field; Attendance: 2,684
	Penalties
	Pickering (penalty missed); Probo (penalty scored); Antonoglou (penalty missed); Ybarra (penalty scored)		(penalty missed) Moshobane; (penalty scored) Dengler; (penalty scored) Crull; (penalty scored) Ndiaye; (penalty scored) Gasso

May 16 Group Stage	Athletic Club Boise	4–3	Monterey Bay FC	Garden City, Idaho
7:00 PM MST	Kostyshyn 30'; Ndiaye (yellow card) 38'; Gasso 51'; Crull 55'; Amang 86'; Sargis (yellow card) 89'	Report	Blancas 9' (yellow card) 18'; Leggett 20'; Gordon (yellow card) 23' (yellow-red card) 73'; Nadje 34' (yellow card) 45'; Farnsworth (yellow card) 41'	Stadium: Stadium at Expo Idaho; Attendance: 7,206; Referee: Muhammad Kaleia

June 6 Group Stage	Spokane Velocity	2–1	Athletic Club Boise	Spokane, Washington
7:00 PM MST	Margvelashvili (yellow card) 38'; Veidman (yellow card) 65'; Miller 71'; Lewis 74'	Report	Amang (yellow card) 41'; Crull (yellow card) 50'; Kostyshyn (yellow card) 66'; Lewis 76' (o.g.)	Stadium: One Spokane Stadium; Attendance: 2,325; Referee: Christian Campo

July 11 Group Stage	Athletic Club Boise	2–0	Sacramento Republic FC	Garden City, Idaho
7:30 PM MST	Moon 7'; Moshobane 64'	Report	Kaye (yellow card) 27'	Stadium: Stadium at Expo Idaho; Attendance: 7,247; Referee: Brandon Stevis

=== Appearances and goals ===
No.	Pos	Nat	Player	Total		USL League One		USL Cup		USL League One Playoffs	
No.	Pos	Nat	Player	Apps	Goals	Apps	Goals	Apps	Goals	Apps	Goals
1	GK	(Ghana) GHA	Joseph Andema	4	0	4+0	0	0+0	0	0+0	0
2	DF	(United States) USA	Jonathan Ricketts	39	1	28+4	1	4+0	0	3+0	0
3	DF	(United States) USA	Keegan Oyler	18	1	2+12	0	2+2	1	0+0	0
4	DF	(United States) USA	Benian Yao	0	0	0+0	0	0+0	0	0+0	0
5	DF	(Senegal) SEN	Moussa Ndiaye	33	0	15+14	0	3+1	0	0+0	0
6	MF	(England) ENG	Charlie Adams	23	0	13+5	0	2+0	0	3+0	0
7	MF	(United States) USA	Blake Bodily	28	4	19+3	4	2+1	0	3+0	0
8	MF	(United States) USA	Dominic Gasso	33	2	13+14	1	2+1	1	0+3	0
9	FW	(Brazil) BRA	Luan Brito	15	2	7+5	2	1+2	0	0+0	0
10	MF	(Ukraine) UKR	Denys Kostyshyn	38	9	26+6	8	3+0	1	3+0	0
11	MF	(South Africa) RSA	Tumi Moshobane	37	11	26+4	8	3+1	1	3+0	2
13	GK	(United States) USA	Javier Garcia	1	0	0+0	0	0+1	0	0+0	0
14	MF	(United States) USA	Nick Moon	37	8	29+2	7	3+0	1	3+0	0
15	DF	(Ghana) GHA	Josh Yaro	22	1	18+1	1	2+0	0	0+1	0
16	DF	(Austria) AUT	Jacob Crull	38	2	31+0	1	4+0	1	3+0	0
17	FW	(Canada) CAN	Joseph Hanson	22	0	5+12	0	0+4	0	0+1	0
18	GK	(United States) USA	Jonathan Kliewer	33	0	28+0	0	2+0	0	3+0	0
22	FW	(Cameroon) CMR	Thomas Amang	33	7	13+13	6	4+0	1	0+3	0
23	FW	(United States) USA	Omar Yehya	29	0	5+18	0	0+3	0	0+3	0
25	DF	(United States) USA	Jake Dengler	34	0	28+1	0	2+0	0	3+0	0
27	MF	(United States) USA	Jackson Stephens	3	0	0+2	0	0+1	0	0+0	0
33	DF	(United States) USA	Hayden Sargis	8	0	2+4	0	1+1	0	0+0	0
36	FW	(Spain) ESP	Jesús Barea	16	8	10+3	6	0+0	0	3+0	2
66	MF	(Kenya) KEN	Philip Mayaka	39	2	30+2	2	2+2	0	3+0	0
99	GK	(United States) USA	Jared Mazzola	2	0	0+0	0	2+0	0	0+0	0

=== Top Goalscorers ===
Rank	Position	Number	Name	USL1 Season	USL Cup	USL League One Playoffs	Total
1	MF	11	(South Africa) Tumi Moshobane	8	1	2	11
2	MF	10	(Ukraine) Denys Kostyshyn	8	1	0	9
3	MF	14	(United States) Nick Moon	7	1	0	8
3	FW	36	(Spain) Jesús Barea	6	0	2	8
5	FW	22	(Cameroon) Thomas Amang	6	1	0	7
6			Own Goals	3	1	1	5
7	MF	7	(United States) Blake Bodily	4	0	0	4
8	FW	9	(Brazil) Luan Brito	3	0	0	3
9	MF	66	(Kenya) Philip Mayaka	2	0	0	2
9	MF	8	(United States) Dominic Gasso	1	1	0	2
9	DF	16	(Austria) Jacob Crull	1	1	0	2
12	DF	2	(United States) Jonathan Ricketts	1	0	0	1
12	DF	15	(Ghana) Joshua Yaro	1	0	0	1
12	MF	3	(United States) Keegan Oyler	0	1	0	1
Total				51	8	5	64

=== Assist scorers ===
Rank	Position	Number	Name	USL1 Season	USL Cup	USL League One Playoffs	Total
1	MF	7	(United States) Blake Bodily	3	2	2	7
2	DF	2	(United States) Jonathan Ricketts	6	0	0	6
3	FW	22	(Cameroon) Thomas Amang	4	1	0	5
3	MF	14	(United States) Nick Moon	3	0	2	5
5	FW	36	(Spain) Jesús Barea	4	0	0	4
6	MF	8	(United States) Dominic Gasso	3	0	0	3
6	MF	10	(Ukraine) Denys Kostyshyn	3	0	0	3
8	MF	11	(South Africa) Tumi Moshobane	2	0	0	2
8	MF	66	(Kenya) Philip Mayaka	2	0	0	2
8	MF	3	(United States) Keegan Oyler	1	1	0	2
11	DF	16	(Austria) Jacob Crull	1	0	0	1
11	FW	23	(United States) Omar Yehya	1	0	0	1
Total				32	4	4	40

=== Clean sheets ===
Rank	Name	USL1 Season	USL Cup	USL1 Playoffs	Total
1	(United States) Jonathan Klewier	8	0	2	10
2	(Ghana) Joseph Andema	1	0	0	1
Total		9	0	2	11

=== Disciplinary record ===
No.	Pos.	Player	USL League One Regular Season			USL Cup			USL League One Playoffs			Total		
No.	Pos.	Player	Yellow card	(yellow card) (yellow-red card)	Red card	Yellow card	(yellow card) (yellow-red card)	Red card	Yellow card	(yellow card) (yellow-red card)	Red card	Yellow card	(yellow card) (yellow-red card)	Red card
1	GK	(Ghana) Joseph Andema	0	0	0	0	0	0	0	0	0	0	0	0
2	DF	(United States) Jonathan Ricketts	4	0	0	0	0	0	0	0	0	4	0	0
3	DF	(United States) Keegan Oyler	0	0	0	0	0	0	0	0	0	0	0	0
4	DF	(United States) Benian Yao	0	0	0	0	0	0	0	0	0	0	0	0
5	DF	(Senegal) Moussa Ndiaye	4	0	0	1	0	0	0	0	0	5	0	0
6	MF	(England) Charlie Adams	1	0	0	0	0	0	0	0	0	1	0	0
7	MF	(United States) Blake Bodily	3	0	0	0	0	0	1	0	0	4	0	0
8	MF	(United States) Dominic Gasso	6	0	0	0	0	0	0	0	0	6	0	0
9	FW	(Brazil) Luan Brito	1	0	0	0	0	0	0	0	0	1	0	0
10	MF	(Ukraine) Denys Kostyshyn	6	0	0	1	0	0	1	0	0	7	0	0
11	MF	(South Africa) Tumi Moshobane	1	0	0	0	0	0	0	0	0	1	0	0
13	GK	(United States) Javier Garcia	0	0	0	0	0	0	0	0	0	0	0	0
14	MF	(United States) Nick Moon	4	1	0	0	0	0	0	0	0	4	1	0
15	DF	(Ghana) Josh Yaro	0	0	0	0	0	0	0	0	0	0	0	0
16	DF	(Austria) Jacob Crull	4	0	0	1	0	0	0	0	0	5	0	0
17	FW	(Canada) Joseph Hanson	1	0	0	0	0	0	0	0	0	1	0	0
18	GK	(United States) Jonathan Kliewer	6	0	0	0	0	0	1	0	0	7	0	0
22	FW	(Cameroon) Thomas Amang	6	0	0	2	0	0	1	0	0	9	0	0
23	FW	(United States) Omar Yehya	4	0	0	0	0	0	0	0	0	4	0	0
25	DF	(United States) Jake Dengler	4	0	0	0	0	0	2	0	0	6	0	0
27	MF	(United States) Jackson Stephens	0	0	0	0	0	0	0	0	0	0	0	0
33	DF	(United States) Hayden Sargis	0	0	0	1	0	0	0	0	0	1	0	0
36	FW	(Spain) Jesús Barea	2	0	1	0	0	0	1	0	0	3	0	1
66	MF	(Kenya) Philip Mayaka	11	0	0	0	0	0	1	0	0	12	0	0
	Head Coach	(United States) Nate Miller	7	1	0	0	0	0	1	0	0	8	1	0
Total			75	2	0	6	0	0	9	0	0	90	2	0

== Honors and awards ==
=== USL League One Annual Awards ===
==== USL League One All League Honorees ====
Player	Team	Position	Ref
(Austria) Jacob Crull	Second	DF	
(Kenya) Philip Mayaka	Second	MF	

=== Monthly Awards ===
==== USL League One Player of the Month ====
Month	Player	Position	Ref
April	(Ukraine) Denys Kostyshyn	FW	

=== Weekly Awards ===
==== USL League One Team of the Week ====
Week	Player	Opponent	Position	Ref
1	(Ghana) Joseph Andema	Sarasota Paradise	GK	
1	(Kenya) Philip Mayaka	Sarasota Paradise	MF	
1	(Ukraine) Denys Kostyshyn	Sarasota Paradise	FW	
1	(United States) Nate Miller	Sarasota Paradise	Coach	
1	(United States) Jonathan Ricketts	Sarasota Paradise	Bench	
1	(England) Blake Bodily	Sarasota Paradise	Bench	
3	(Kenya) Philip Mayaka	Union Omaha	MF	
5	(Austria) Jacob Crull	Spokane Velocity	DF	
5	(United States) Jake Dengler	Spokane Velocity	Bench	
5	(United States) Blake Bodily	Spokane Velocity	Bench	
5	(United States) Nick Moon	Spokane Velocity	Bench	
6	(United States) Blake Bodily	AV Alta FC	Bench	
7	(United States) Jonathan Ricketts	Westchester SC	DF	
7	(United States) Jake Dengler	Westchester SC	DF	
7	(Ukraine) Denys Kostyshyn	Westchester SC	FW	
7	(United States) Jonathan Kliewer	Westchester SC	Bench	
8/9	(Austria) Jacob Crull	Chattanooga Red Wolves SC	Bench	
8/9	(United States) Blake Bodily	Chattanooga Red Wolves SC	Bench	
8/9	(South Africa) Tumi Moshobane	Chattanooga Red Wolves SC	Bench	
10	(United States) Jonathan Kliewer	Charlotte Independence	Bench	
13	(United States) Jonathan Ricketts	Richmond Kickers	Bench	
16	(United States) Jonathan Kliewer	Union Omaha	Bench	
19/20	(Cameroon) Thomas Amang	Portland Hearts of Pine	FW	
21	(Austria) Jacob Crull	New York Cosmos	DF	
21	(United States) Blake Bodily	New York Cosmos	Bench	
22	(Spain) Jesús Barea	Greenville Triumph SC	Bench	
23	(United States) Blake Bodily	Forward Madison FC	FW	
23	(Kenya) Philip Mayaka	Forward Madison FC	Bench	
25	(United States) Jonathan Ricketts	One Knoxville SC	DF	
26	(United States) Nick Moon	Chattanooga Red Wolves SC	MF	
26	(United States) Blake Bodily	Chattanooga Red Wolves SC	Bench	
27	(United States) Jonathan Ricketts	FC Naples	DF	
27	(United States) Blake Bodily	FC Naples	MF	
28	(United States) Blake Bodily	New York Cosmos	MF	
28	(United States) Jonathan Kliewer	New York Cosmos	Bench	
29	(Spain) Jesús Barea	Spokane Velocity	Bench	
30	(Cameroon) Thomas Amang	Corpus Christi FC	Bench	
31	(Ghana) Joshua Yaro	Greenville Triumph SC	Bench	
32	(United States) Jonathan Ricketts	Portland Hearts of Pine	MF	
32	(Kenya) Philip Mayaka	Portland Hearts of Pine	Bench	
33	(Spain) Jesús Barea	AV Alta FC	Forward	
34	(United States) Jonathan Kliewer	Fort Wayne FC	GK	
34	(United States) Nick Moon	Fort Wayne FC	MF	

==== USL League One Player of the Week ====
Week	Player	Opponent	Position	Ref
7	(Ukraine) Denys Kostyshyn	Westchester SC	FW	

==== USL League One Goal of the Week ====
Week	Player	Opponent	Position	Ref
7	(Ukraine) Denys Kostyshyn	Westchester SC	FW	
23	(United States) Blake Bodily	Forward Madison FC	MF	
28	(South Africa) Tumi Moshobane	New York Cosmos	MF	

==== USL League One Save of the Week ====
Week	Player	Opponent	Ref
34	(United States) Jonathan Kliewer	Fort Wayne FC	

=== USL Cup Awards ===
==== Prinx Tires USL Cup Team of the Round ====
Week	Player	Opponent	Position	Ref
2	(United States) Blake Bodily	Monterey Bay FC	MF	

==== Prinx Tires USL Cup Save of the Round ====
Week	Player	Opponent	Ref
1	(United States) Jonathan Kliewer	Las Vegas Lights FC	
