= 2026 USL Cup =

3rd edition of cup competition in American soccer

Prinx Tires USL Cup

Tournament details
- Country: United States
- Dates: April 25, 2026 – October 4, 2026
- Teams: 42

Final positions
- Champions: Louisville City FC (1st title)
- Runners-up: Hartford Athletic
- Semifinalists: Colorado Springs Switchbacks; San Antonio FC

Tournament statistics
- Matches played: 89
- Goals scored: 254 (2.85 per match)
- Attendance: 365,672 (4,109 per match)
- Top goal scorer(s): (United States) Jansen Wilson (4 goals)

The 2026 USL Cup was the third edition of the USL Cup (known as the Prinx Tires USL Cup for sponsorship reasons). The competition was open to all clubs in the USL Championship and USL League One.

Louisville City FC won its first trophy, defeating defending champion Hartford Athletic 1–0 in the final.

== Format ==
The 2026 edition of the USL Cup was a professional soccer tournament held between teams in USL Championship and USL League One. Teams were split into seven groups of six or seven teams; each team played two teams in their group at home, and two others away. The group winners, along with the second-place team with the highest point total, moved to a single-elimination knockout round. The first tiebreaker was goals scored.

=== Schedule ===
The 2026 USL Cup ran concurrently with the 2026 USL Championship season and the 2026 USL League One season. The tournament began roughly one month into the league seasons and ended shortly before the end of the league seasons and start of the league playoffs.

The groups for the 2026 USL Cup were announced on December 10, 2025.

== Access ==
All 25 clubs in USL Championship and 17 clubs in USL League One will enter the 2026 USL Cup in the group stage.

Round	Entrants	Number of games	Date(s)
Group stage (42 clubs)	25 clubs from USL Championship; 17 clubs from USL League One	82	April 25, 2026 – July 11, 2026
Quarterfinals (8 clubs)	7 group stage winners 1 wild card	4	August 12, 2026
Semifinals (4 clubs)	4 winners from quarterfinals	2	September 8, 2026
Final (2 clubs)	2 winners from semifinals	1	October 4, 2026

=== Location map ===
Locations of teams in the 2025 USL Cup
- Group 1
- Group 2
- Group 3
- Group 4
- Group 5
- Group 6
- Group 7

== Group stage ==
Number of teams per tier still in competition
Championship	League 1	Total
25 / 25	17 / 17	42 / 42

The group stage was played from April 25 to July 11. Teams were divided into seven regional groups of six or seven teams. They played two teams in their group at home and two other teams away.

If a team won in regulation, they received three points in the standings, while the loser received zero. If the game was tied at the end of regulation, a penalty kick shootout occurred; the winner received two points and the loser received one.

The top team in each group reached a single-elimination knockout stage. A wild-card spot was awarded to the second-placed team with the most points in group play, with most goals scored being used as first tiebreaker.

=== Group 1 ===
Pos	Lg	Team	Pld	W	PKW	PKL	L	GF	GA	GD	Pts	Qualification
1	USL1	Spokane Velocity FC	4	3	0	0	1	6	6	0	9	Advance to knockout stage
2	USL1	AC Boise	4	2	1	0	1	8	6	+2	8	
3	USLC	Sacramento Republic FC	4	2	1	0	1	6	3	+3	8	
4	USLC	Oakland Roots SC	4	1	0	1	2	4	5	−1	4	
5	USLC	Las Vegas Lights FC	4	1	0	1	2	4	6	−2	4	
6	USLC	Monterey Bay FC	4	0	1	1	2	7	9	−2	3	

April 25	Sacramento Republic FC	4–0	Spokane Velocity FC	Sacramento, California
10:00 p.m.	Wolff 5'; Malango 45+4', 56'; Benítez 81'			Stadium: Heart Health Park; Attendance: 9,115; Referee: Carlos Rodriguez

April 25	Las Vegas Lights FC	1–1 (2–4 p)	Athletic Club Boise	Las Vegas, Nevada
10:30 p.m.	Pickering 61'	Report	Oyler 64'	Stadium: Cashman Field; Attendance: 2,684; Referee: Robert Vincze
	Penalties
	Pickering (penalty scored); Probo (penalty scored); Antonoglou (penalty scored); Ybarra (penalty scored)		(penalty missed) Moshobane; (penalty scored) Dengler; (penalty scored) Crull; (penalty scored) Ndiaye; (penalty scored) Gasso

April 25	Monterey Bay FC	1–1 (4–3 p)	Oakland Roots SC	Seaside, California
10:00 p.m.	Paul 63'		Kill 15'	Stadium: Cardinale Stadium; Attendance: 3,605; Referee: Kalilou Jarju
	Penalties
	Paul (penalty missed); Leggett (penalty scored); Glasgow (penalty scored); Joseph (penalty scored); Blancas (penalty missed); Gordon (penalty scored)		(penalty scored) de Vicente; (penalty missed) Wilson; (penalty missed) Prentice; (penalty scored) Tingey; (penalty scored) McCabe; (penalty missed) Elmasnaouy

May 16	Oakland Roots SC	0–1	Sacramento Republic FC	Oakland, California
8:00 p.m.		Report	Malango 56'	Stadium: Oakland-Alameda County Coliseum; Attendance: 5,669; Referee: Matthew Corrigan

May 16	Athletic Club Boise	4–3	Monterey Bay FC	Garden City, Idaho
9:00 p.m.	Kostyshyn 30'; Gasso 51'; Crull 55'; Amang 86'	Report	Blancas 9'; Leggett 20'; Nadje 34'	Stadium: Stadium at Expo Idaho; Attendance: 7,206; Referee: Muhammad Kaleia

May 17	Spokane Velocity FC	1–0	Las Vegas Lights FC	Spokane, Washington
7:00 p.m.	Vinyals 7'			Stadium: ONE Spokane Stadium; Attendance: 1,833; Referee: Steven Cardozo

June 6	Las Vegas Lights FC	0–2	Oakland Roots SC	Las Vegas, Nevada
10:30 p.m.		Report	de Vicente 41'; Lepley 59'	Stadium: Cashman Field; Attendance: 2,774; Referee: Jaclyn Metz

June 6	Sacramento Republic FC	1–1 (5–3 p)	Monterey Bay FC	Sacramento, California
11:00 p.m.	Benítez 60' (pen.)	Report	Bidois 55'	Stadium: Heart Health Park; Attendance: 9,425; Referee: Calin Radosav
	Penalties
	Kaye (penalty scored); Benítez (penalty scored); Desmond (penalty scored); Malango (penalty scored); Spaulding (penalty scored)		(penalty scored) Blancas; (penalty missed) Paul; (penalty scored) Glasgow; (penalty scored) Leggett

June 6	Spokane Velocity FC	2–1	Athletic Club Boise	Spokane, Washington
9:00 p.m.	Miller 71'; Lewis 74'	Report	Lewis 76' (o.g.)	Stadium: ONE Spokane Stadium; Attendance: 2,325; Referee: Cristian Campo Hernandez

July 11	Oakland Roots SC	1–3	Spokane Velocity FC	Oakland, California
3:00 p.m.	Hackshaw 2'	Report	Brett 34', 55'; Peláez 90+5'	Stadium: Oakland-Alameda County Coliseum; Attendance: 1,474; Referee: Brad Jensen

July 11	Athletic Club Boise	2–0	Sacramento Republic FC	Garden City, Idaho
9:30 p.m.	Moon 7'; Moshobane 64'	Report		Stadium: Stadium at Expo Idaho; Attendance: 7,247; Referee: Brandon Stevis

July 11	Monterey Bay FC	2–3	Las Vegas Lights FC	Seaside, California
10:00 p.m.	Farnsworth 4'; Joseph 30'	Report	Okyere 71'; Anderson 85', 90+3'	Stadium: Cardinale Stadium; Attendance: 2,400; Referee: Ricardo Fierro

=== Group 2 ===
Pos	Lg	Team	Pld	W	PKW	PKL	L	GF	GA	GD	Pts	Qualification
1	USLC	Colorado Springs Switchbacks FC	4	4	0	0	0	10	1	+9	12	Advance to knockout stage
2	USLC	New Mexico United	4	3	0	0	1	8	5	+3	9	
3	USLC	El Paso Locomotive FC	4	2	0	0	2	5	5	0	6	
4	USL1	AV Alta FC	4	2	0	0	2	5	6	−1	6	
5	USLC	Phoenix Rising FC	4	1	0	0	3	3	8	−5	3	
6	USLC	Orange County SC	4	0	0	0	4	3	9	−6	0	

April 25	New Mexico United	2–1	AV Alta FC	Albuquerque, New Mexico
9:00 p.m.	Harris 36'; Rennicks 74'	Report	Aoumaich 18'	Stadium: Rio Grande Credit Union Field at Isotopes Park; Attendance: 9,605; Referee: Benjamin Meyer

April 25	Orange County SC	1–2	El Paso Locomotive FC	Irvine, California
10:00 p.m.	Doody 51'		Alfaro 64'; Coronado 78'	Stadium: Championship Soccer Stadium; Attendance: 4,408; Referee: Jaclyn Metz

April 25	Phoenix Rising FC	0–1	Colorado Springs Switchbacks FC	Phoenix, Arizona
10:00 p.m.			Foster 26'	Stadium: Phoenix Rising Soccer Stadium; Attendance: 7,002; Referee: Trevor Wiseman

May 16	Colorado Springs Switchbacks FC	4–0	New Mexico United	Colorado Springs, Colorado
9:00 p.m.	Keller 31' (o.g.); Hanya 34'; Fjeldberg 45'; Rocha 82'	Report		Stadium: Weidner Field; Attendance: 6,311; Referee: Abdou Ndiaye

May 16	Phoenix Rising FC	2–1	Orange County SC	Phoenix, Arizona
10:00 p.m.	Moursou 28'; Ramirez 68'	Report	Johnson 22'	Stadium: Phoenix Rising Soccer Stadium; Attendance: 5,527; Referee: Matthew Thompson

May 27	El Paso Locomotive FC	2–0	AV Alta FC	El Paso, Texas
9:00 p.m.	Dollenmayer 72'; Abitia 79'	Report		Stadium: Southwest University Park; Attendance: 5,042; Referee: Justin St. Pierre

June 6	Colorado Springs Switchbacks FC	2–1	El Paso Locomotive FC	Colorado Springs, Colorado
9:00 p.m.	Tejada 38'; Fjeldberg 70'	Report	Alfaro 45+2'	Stadium: Weidner Field; Attendance: 6,092; Referee: Joshua Encarnación

June 6	New Mexico United	4–0	Phoenix Rising FC	Albuquerque, New Mexico
9:30 p.m.	Reid-Stephen 45+1'; Jabang 53'; Noël 70'; Harris 85'			Stadium: Rio Grande Credit Union Field at Isotopes Park; Attendance: 9,389; Referee: Brad Jensen

June 6	AV Alta FC	2–1	Orange County SC	Lancaster, California
11:00 p.m.	Anderson 42'; Aoumaich 76'	Report	Brewitt 27'	Stadium: Lancaster Municipal Stadium; Attendance: 3,206; Referee: Brandon Stevis

July 11	El Paso Locomotive FC	0–2	New Mexico United	El Paso, Texas
9:00 p.m.			Quiah 85'; Bailey 89'	Stadium: Southwest University Park; Attendance: 5,011; Referee: Jeremy Scheer

July 11	Orange County SC	0–3	Colorado Springs Switchbacks FC	Irvine, California
10:00 p.m.			Rocha 53'; Masareka 81'; Tejada 90'	Stadium: Championship Soccer Stadium; Attendance: 4,608; Referee: Mark Verso

July 11	AV Alta FC	2–1	Phoenix Rising FC	Lancaster, California
11:00 p.m.	Aoumaich 12' (pen.); Bahena Jr. 32'		Studenhofft 71'	Stadium: Lancaster Municipal Stadium; Attendance: 2,911; Referee: Ivan de Cristofaro

=== Group 3 ===
Pos	Lg	Team	Pld	W	PKW	PKL	L	GF	GA	GD	Pts	Qualification
1	USLC	San Antonio FC	4	3	1	0	0	5	1	+4	11	Advance to knockout stage
2	USLC	Birmingham Legion FC	4	2	1	1	0	7	2	+5	9	
3	USL1	One Knoxville SC	4	0	3	0	1	3	4	−1	6	
4	USLC	FC Tulsa	4	1	0	1	2	4	6	−2	4	
5	USL1	Corpus Christi FC	4	1	0	1	2	2	5	−3	4	
6	USL1	Chattanooga Red Wolves SC	4	0	0	2	2	2	5	−3	2	

April 25	Chattanooga Red Wolves SC	0–1	Corpus Christi FC	Chattanooga, Tennessee
7:00 p.m.			Bowen 7'	Stadium: CHI Memorial Stadium; Attendance: 1,278; Referee: Drew Klemp

April 25	FC Tulsa	1–1 (2–3 p)	One Knoxville SC	Tulsa, Oklahoma
8:00 p.m.	Cabral 73'		Baker 36'	Stadium: ONEOK Field; Attendance: 3,200; Referee: Igor Bych
	Penalties
	Lapa (penalty scored); Pierre (penalty missed); Sparks (penalty missed); Damm (penalty missed); Kocevski (penalty missed)		(penalty missed) Diene; (penalty scored) Conway; (penalty scored) Fernández; (penalty scored) Baker; (penalty missed) Murphy

April 25	San Antonio FC	0–0 (3–2 p)	Birmingham Legion FC	San Antonio, Texas
8:30 p.m.				Stadium: Toyota Field; Attendance: 5,850; Referee: Atahan Yaya
	Penalties
	Taintor (penalty scored); Cuello (penalty scored); Suárez (penalty scored); Hernandez (penalty scored)		(penalty scored) Pasher; (penalty missed) Saucedo; (penalty missed) Tregarthen; (penalty scored) Williams

May 16	Chattanooga Red Wolves SC	1–1 (2–3 p)	Birmingham Legion FC	Chattanooga, Tennessee
7:00 p.m.	Mercer 77'	Report	Saucedo 67'	Stadium: CHI Memorial Stadium; Attendance: 1,551; Referee: Natalie Simon
	Penalties
	Hernandez (penalty missed); Bentley (penalty missed); Ramos (penalty missed); Acosta (penalty scored); Lelin (penalty scored)		(penalty missed) Pasher; (penalty scored) McCartney; (penalty scored) Saucedo; (penalty missed) Hughes; (penalty scored) Ngoma

May 16	One Knoxville SC	0–1	San Antonio FC	Knoxville, Tennessee
7:00 p.m.		Report	Suárez 45+4'	Stadium: Covenant Health Park; Attendance: 4,702

May 16	Corpus Christi FC	0–1	FC Tulsa	Corpus Christi, Texas
8:30 p.m.		Report	Cabral 80'	Stadium: Corpus Christi Sports Complex; Attendance: 615; Referee: Mark Verso

June 6	FC Tulsa	1–2	San Antonio FC	Tulsa, Oklahoma
8:30 p.m.	Cabral 18'	Report	Maldonado 51'; Henderson 90+1'	Stadium: ONEOK Field; Attendance: 4,953; Referee: Nabil Bensalah

June 9	Birmingham Legion FC	3–0	Corpus Christi FC	Birmingham, Alabama
8:00 p.m.	Saucedo 9' (pen.); Williams 12'; Tregarthen 72'			Stadium: Protective Stadium; Attendance: 2,565; Referee: Muhammad Hassan

June 10	One Knoxville SC	1–1 (5–4 p)	Chattanooga Red Wolves SC	Knoxville, Tennessee
7:00 p.m.	Krioutchenkov 71'		Bentley 90'	Stadium: Covenant Health Park; Attendance: 2,347; Referee: John Matto
	Penalties
	Krioutchenkov (penalty scored); Linhares (penalty scored); Fernández (penalty scored); Perkins (penalty scored); Caputo (penalty scored)		(penalty scored) Bentley; (penalty scored) Acosta; (penalty scored) Mercer; (penalty scored) Wessels; (penalty missed) Hernández

July 11	Birmingham Legion FC	3–1	FC Tulsa	Birmingham, Alabama
8:00 p.m.	Vassell 28', 84'; Williams 90+3'	Report	Dorsey 33'	Stadium: Protective Stadium; Attendance: 3,327; Referee: Gerald Flores

July 11	Corpus Christi FC	1–1 (2–4 p)	One Knoxville SC	Corpus Christi, Texas
8:30 p.m.	Pondeca 78'	Report	Rosamilia 90+4'	Stadium: Corpus Christi Sports Complex; Attendance: 1,128; Referee: Crstian Campo Hernandez
	Penalties
	Bowen (penalty missed); Kearney (penalty scored); Keegan (penalty scored)		(penalty scored) Krioutchenkov; (penalty scored) Fernández; (penalty scored) Linhares; (penalty scored) Rosamilia

July 11	San Antonio FC	2–0	Chattanooga Red Wolves SC	San Antonio, Texas
9:00 p.m.	Patiño 45'; Calov 45+1'	Report		Stadium: Toyota Field; Attendance: 5,255; Referee: Muhammad Kaleia

=== Group 4 ===
Pos	Lg	Team	Pld	W	PKW	PKL	L	GF	GA	GD	Pts	Qualification
1	USLC	Louisville City FC	4	3	1	0	0	12	4	+8	11	Advance to knockout stage
2	USLC	Detroit City FC	4	2	0	2	0	4	2	+2	8	
3	USLC	Indy Eleven	4	1	2	0	1	5	4	+1	7	
4	USL1	Union Omaha	4	2	0	0	2	10	12	−2	6	
5	USLC	Lexington SC	4	1	1	1	1	7	7	0	6	
6	USL1	Forward Madison FC	4	1	0	0	3	6	10	−4	3	
7	USL1	Fort Wayne FC	4	0	0	1	3	6	11	−5	1	

April 25	Indy Eleven	1–2	Union Omaha	Indianapolis, Indiana
7:00 p.m.	Rendón 80'		Faz 44'; Borczak 56'	Stadium: Michael A. Carroll Stadium; Attendance: 8,552; Referee: Elvis Osmanovic

April 25	Lexington SC	4–2	Forward Madison FC	Lexington, Kentucky
7:00 p.m.	Zengue 39'; Greene 63'; Epps 68'; Goodrum 90+2'		Edwards 45+1'; Zengue 70' (o.g.)	Stadium: Lexington SC Stadium; Attendance: 4,209; Referee: Jorge Escobar

April 25	Louisville City FC	3–1	Fort Wayne FC	Louisville, Kentucky
7:00 p.m.	Duncan 8'; Serrano 76'; Adams 81'		Ricol 5'	Stadium: Lynn Family Stadium; Attendance: 8,876; Referee: Thomas Snyder

May 16	Forward Madison FC	0–1	Detroit City FC	Madison, Wisconsin
6:00 p.m.		Report	Yamazaki 88'	Stadium: Breese Stevens Field; Attendance: 4,178; Referee: Robert Vincze

May 16	Fort Wayne FC	2–2 (1–3 p)	Indy Eleven	Fort Wayne, Indiana
7:30 p.m.	Healy 33'; Thomas 90+1'	Report	Quinn 26'; Rendón 64'	Stadium: Fort Wayne FC Park; Attendance: 3,794; Referee: Muhammad Hassan
	Penalties
	Ricol (penalty scored); Healy (penalty missed); Nieto (penalty missed); Thomas (penalty missed)		(penalty scored) Blake; (penalty scored) Quinn; (penalty scored) O'Brien

May 17	Union Omaha	1–5	Louisville City FC	Omaha, Nebraska
5:00 p.m.	Diego 40'		Wilson 27', 49'; Donovan 72', 83'; Huerman 87'	Stadium: Morrison Stadium; Attendance: 2,041; Referee: Trevor Wiseman

June 6	Indy Eleven	2–0	Forward Madison FC	Indianapolis, Indiana
7:00 p.m.	Craig 48'; O'Brien 54'			Stadium: Michael A. Carroll Stadium; Attendance: 8,586; Referee: Muhammad Kaleia

June 6	Union Omaha	4–2	Fort Wayne FC	Omaha, Nebraska
8:00 p.m.	Faz 15'; Gavilanes 17'; Tekiela 66', 85'		Oyetunde 41'; Becher 45'	Stadium: Morrison Stadium; Attendance: 2,348; Referee: Gerald Flores

June 6	Detroit City FC	1–1 (1–3 p)	Lexington SC	Hamtramck, Michigan
7:00 p.m.	Montgomery 28'	Report	Blessing 90+5'	Stadium: Keyworth Stadium; Attendance: 6,356; Referee: Thomas Snyder
	Penalties
	Diop (penalty missed); Preston (penalty missed); Stanley (penalty missed); Morris (penalty scored)		(penalty scored) Molloy; (penalty scored) Adedokun; (penalty missed) Firmino; (penalty scored) Epps

June 20	Detroit City FC	0–0 (3–4 p)	Louisville City FC	Hamtramck, Michigan
4:00 p.m.				Stadium: Keyworth Stadium; Attendance: 7,051; Referee: Matthew Corrigan
	Penalties
	Morris (penalty scored); Stanley (penalty scored); Williams (penalty scored); Rodriguez (penalty missed)		(penalty scored) Totsch; (penalty scored) Davila; (penalty scored) Moguel Jr.; (penalty scored) Huerman

June 20	Lexington SC	0–0 (6–7 p)	Indy Eleven	Lexington, Kentucky
7:00 p.m.				Stadium: Lexington SC Stadium; Attendance: 5,127; Referee: Sergii Demianchuk
	Penalties
	Molloy (penalty scored); Midence (penalty scored); Ordoñez (penalty scored); Epps (penalty scored); Firmino (penalty scored); Greene (penalty scored)		(penalty scored) O'Brien; (penalty scored) Omar; (penalty scored) Mitrano; (penalty scored) Sharp; (penalty scored) Craig; (penalty scored) Neidlinger; (penalty scored) Rasheed

July 11	Fort Wayne FC	1–2	Detroit City FC	Fort Wayne, Indiana
7:30 p.m.	Ricol 86'		Smith 62'; Mentzingen 71'	Stadium: Fort Wayne FC Park; Attendance: 4,214; Referee: Carlos Rodriguez

July 11	Forward Madison FC	4–3	Union Omaha	Madison, Wisconsin
8:00 p.m.	Bolma 31'; Carmichael 35', 63'; Karamoko 90+6'		Gómez 26'; Navarro 79'; Gutierrez 83' (pen.)	Stadium: Breese Stevens Field; Referee: Elton Garcia

July 11	Louisville City FC	4–2	Lexington SC	Louisville, Kentucky
8:00 p.m.	Wilson 28', 59'; Donovan 34'; Brown 73' (o.g.)		Rodrigues 12'; Zengue 43'	Stadium: Lynn Family Stadium; Attendance: 9,487; Referee: Joshua Encarnacion

=== Group 5 ===
Pos	Lg	Team	Pld	W	PKW	PKL	L	GF	GA	GD	Pts	Qualification
1	USLC	Hartford Athletic	4	3	0	1	0	8	2	+6	10	Advance to knockout stage
2	USLC	Rhode Island FC	4	1	2	0	1	5	3	+2	7	
3	USLC	Brooklyn FC	4	2	0	1	1	9	4	+5	7	
4	USL1	Portland Hearts of Pine	4	1	1	1	1	6	9	−3	6	
5	USL1	New York Cosmos	4	1	0	1	2	5	10	−5	4	
6	USL1	Westchester SC	4	0	1	0	3	5	10	−5	2	

April 25	New York Cosmos	0–3	Brooklyn FC	Paterson, New Jersey
2:00 p.m.			Obregón 35'; Alves 39'; Kanté 43'	Stadium: Hinchliffe Stadium; Attendance: 1,040; Referee: Lauren Aldrich

April 25	Hartford Athletic	0–0 (3–4 p)	Rhode Island FC	Hartford, Connecticut
7:00 p.m.				Stadium: Trinity Health Stadium; Attendance: 2,983; Referee: Muhammad Kaleia
	Penalties
	Diz (penalty scored); Coffey (penalty missed); Real (penalty scored); Scarlett (penalty scored); Careaga (penalty missed)		(penalty scored) Diop; (penalty missed) Bacharach; (penalty scored) Rodríguez; (penalty scored) Scardina; (penalty scored) Yao

April 25	Westchester SC	2–2 (5–4 p)	Portland Hearts of Pine	Mount Vernon, New York
7:00 p.m.	McGlynn 24' (pen.); Burko 50'	Report	Espinosa 7'; Wright 84'	Stadium: The Stadium at Memorial Field; Attendance: 1,056; Referee: Amin Hadzic
	Penalties
	Guezen (penalty scored); Burko (penalty scored); Blommestijn (penalty scored); Jiménez (penalty missed); Bouman (penalty scored); Armas (penalty scored)		(penalty scored) Wright; (penalty missed) Huck; (penalty scored) Kamara; (penalty scored) Georgallides; (penalty scored) Green; (penalty missed) Evans

May 15	Westchester SC	2–3	New York Cosmos	Mount Vernon, New York
7:00 p.m.	Blommestijn 47'; Mackic 69'	Report	Guenzatti 43'; Mendonca 81'; Koffi 90+4'	Stadium: The Stadium at Memorial Field; Attendance: 3,257; Referee: Dorian Del Toro

May 16	Portland Hearts of Pine	2–1	Rhode Island FC	Portland, Maine
4:00 p.m.	Kidd 3'; Wright 27' (pen.)	Report	Dorsey 61'	Stadium: Fitzpatrick Stadium; Attendance: 6,307; Referee: Calin Radosav

May 16	Brooklyn FC	0–2	Hartford Athletic	Brooklyn, New York
7:00 p.m.		Report	Careaga 63'; Ngalina 86'	Stadium: Maimonides Park; Attendance: 1,259; Referee: Luis Arroyo

June 6	New York Cosmos	1–4	Hartford Athletic	Paterson, New Jersey
7:00 p.m.	Chavez 87'		Williams 11'; Coffey 40'; Samadia 45'; Hernández 88'	Stadium: Hinchliffe Stadium; Attendance: 1,159; Referee: John Matto

June 6	Rhode Island FC	3–0	Westchester SC	Pawtucket, Rhode Island
7:30 p.m.	Holstad 41'; Williams 44'; Afonso 75'	Report		Stadium: Centreville Bank Stadium; Attendance: 10,554; Referee: Deny Kulasinac

June 7	Brooklyn FC	5–1	Portland Hearts of Pine	Brooklyn, New York
3:00 p.m.	Anderson 8', 70'; Stojanovic 36', 45+2'; Vancaeyezeele 55'	Report	Camara 19'	Stadium: Maimonides Park; Attendance: 1,977; Referee: Matthew Corrigan

July 11	Hartford Athletic	2–1	Westchester SC	Hartford, Connecticut
7:00 p.m.	Coffey 14'; Williams 41'		Jennings 45+2'	Stadium: Trinity Health Stadium; Attendance: 1,639; Referee: Alyssa Pennington

July 11	Portland Hearts of Pine	1–1 (4–2 p)	New York Cosmos	Portland, Maine
7:00 p.m.	Gonzalez 80'		Marsh 60'	Stadium: Fitzpatrick Stadium; Attendance: 6,231; Referee: Joe Surgan
	Penalties
	Drack (penalty scored); Barbosa (penalty scored); Huck (penalty scored); Gonzalez (penalty scored)		(penalty scored) Zielonka; (penalty scored) Mendonca

July 11	Rhode Island FC	1–1 (4–3 p)	Brooklyn FC	Pawtucket, Rhode Island
7:30 p.m.	Rodríguez 18'		Obregón 45+4'	Stadium: Centreville Bank Stadium; Attendance: 7,030; Referee: Guido Gonzales Jr.
	Penalties
	Scardina (penalty scored); Shapiro-Thompson (penalty scored); Afonso (penalty scored); Koke Vegas (penalty scored)		(penalty scored) McNamara; (penalty scored) Stojanovic; (penalty scored) McLaughlin; (penalty missed) Obregón

=== Group 6 ===
Pos	Lg	Team	Pld	W	PKW	PKL	L	GF	GA	GD	Pts	Qualification
1	USL1	Charlotte Independence	4	2	2	0	0	6	4	+2	10	Advance to knockout stage
2	USLC	Charleston Battery	4	2	1	1	0	8	3	+5	9	
3	USLC	Pittsburgh Riverhounds SC	4	2	0	2	0	6	1	+5	8	
4	USL1	Greenville Triumph SC	4	1	0	0	3	4	7	−3	3	
5	USLC	Loudoun United FC	4	1	0	0	3	4	7	−3	3	
6	USL1	Richmond Kickers	4	1	0	0	3	3	9	−6	3	

April 25	Loudoun United FC	1–2	Charleston Battery	Leesburg, Virginia
6:00 p.m.	Santos 27'		Berry 16'; Smith 90+2'	Stadium: Segra Field; Attendance: 1,227; Referee: Deny Kulasinac

April 25	Richmond Kickers	1–2	Charlotte Independence	Richmond, Virginia
6:00 p.m.	Layton 79'		Martínez 10', 39'	Stadium: City Stadium; Attendance: 3,422; Referee: John Griggs

April 25	Pittsburgh Riverhounds SC	3–0	Greenville Triumph SC	Pittsburgh, Pennsylvania
7:00 p.m.	Amann 7', 62'; Viera 42'			Stadium: F.N.B. Stadium; Attendance: 3,989; Referee: Luis Arroyo

May 15	Charlotte Independence	1–1 (4–2 p)	Pittsburgh Riverhounds SC	Charlotte, North Carolina
7:30 p.m.	Garcia 81'	Report	Manzinga 22'	Stadium: American Legion Memorial Stadium; Attendance: 2,545; Referee: Elvis Osmanovic
	Penalties
	Álvarez (penalty scored); Bakero (penalty scored); Romero (penalty scored); Marou (penalty scored)		(penalty scored) Bassett; (penalty missed) Ahl; (penalty scored) Dikwa; (penalty missed) Mertz

May 16	Richmond Kickers	0–4	Charleston Battery	Richmond, Virginia
6:00 p.m.		Report	Blackstock 20'; Swan 40'; Berry 69'; Kelly 73'	Stadium: City Stadium; Attendance: 4,881; Referee: Benjamin Meyer

June 6	Loudoun United FC	2–0	Richmond Kickers	Leesburg, Virginia
6:00 p.m.	Úlfarsson 68', 80'			Stadium: Segra Field; Attendance: 2,260; Referee: Carlos Rodriguez

June 6	Charleston Battery	0–0 (4–2 p)	Pittsburgh Riverhounds SC	Mount Pleasant, South Carolina
7:00 p.m.				Stadium: Patriots Point; Attendance: 4,475; Referee: Rodrigo Albuquerque
	Penalties
	Suber (penalty scored); Berry (penalty scored); Pakmohov (penalty scored); Akpunonu (penalty scored)		(penalty scored) Mertz; (penalty scored) Wälti; (penalty missed) Garcia; (penalty missed) Flowers-Gamboa

June 10	Greenville Triumph SC	3–1	Loudoun United FC	Greenville, South Carolina
7:00 p.m.	Akio 43'; Evans 64'; Bouregy 85'		Murphy 90+3'	Stadium: GE Vernova Park; Attendance: 2,876; Referee: Kyle Johnston

June 24	Charlotte Independence	1–0	Greenville Triumph SC	Charlotte, North Carolina
7:30 p.m.	Manin 77'			Stadium: American Legion Memorial Stadium; Attendance: 713; Referee: Matthew Corrigan

July 11	Pittsburgh Riverhounds SC	2–0	Loudoun United FC	Pittsburgh, Pennsylvania
5:00 p.m.	Amann 19' (pen.); Dikwa 66'			Stadium: F.N.B. Stadium; Attendance: 5,027; Referee: Kalilou Jarju

July 11	Greenville Triumph SC	1–2	Richmond Kickers	Greenville, South Carolina
7:00 p.m.	Meek 50'		Bubb 60' (o.g.); Howell 80'	Stadium: GE Vernova Park; Attendance: 2,131; Referee: Daniel Emeri

July 11	Charleston Battery	2–2 (2–4 p)	Charlotte Independence	Mount Pleasant, South Carolina
7:30 p.m.	Foster 27'; Swan 59'		Bakero 37'; Marou 53'	Stadium: Patriots Point; Attendance: 3,002; Referee: Mario Maric
	Penalties
	Suber (penalty scored); Ycaza (penalty scored)		(penalty scored) Saydee; (penalty scored) Romero; (penalty scored) Marou; (penalty scored) Amaya

=== Group 7 ===
Pos	Lg	Team	Pld	W	PKW	PKL	L	GF	GA	GD	Pts	Qualification
1	USLC	Tampa Bay Rowdies	4	4	0	0	0	10	1	+9	12	Advance to knockout stage
2	USLC	Miami FC	4	3	0	0	1	11	5	+6	9	Advance to knockout stage (wild card)
3	USLC	Sporting Club Jacksonville	4	1	0	1	2	3	4	−1	4	
4	USL1	Sarasota Paradise	4	1	0	0	3	2	9	−7	3	
5	USL1	FC Naples	4	0	1	0	3	2	9	−7	2	

April 25	Sporting JAX	0–1	Miami FC	Jacksonville, Florida
7:30 p.m.			Rocha 9'	Stadium: Hodges Stadium; Attendance: 1,642; Referee: Brad Jensen

April 25	Tampa Bay Rowdies	2–0	Sarasota Paradise	St. Petersburg, Florida
7:30 p.m.	Henderlong 31', 58'			Stadium: Al Lang Stadium; Attendance: 5,669; Referee: Stefan Perri

April 29	Miami FC	4–1	FC Naples	Miami, Florida
7:00 p.m.	Rocha 8'; Tunbridge 12'; Ndiaye 17'; Locadia 55'	Report	Bachstein 30'	Stadium: Pitbull Stadium; Attendance: 821; Referee: Elvis Osmanovic

May 13	Sarasota Paradise	0–2	Sporting JAX	Lakewood Ranch, Florida
7:30 p.m.		Report	Pedder 34'; Al-Qaq 87'	Stadium: Premier Sports Campus; Attendance: 683; Referee: Erick Lezama

May 16	Miami FC	1–4	Tampa Bay Rowdies	Miami, Florida
7:00 p.m.	Tunbridge 80'	Report	Perez 12'; Myers 42', 47'; Schneider 68'	Stadium: Pitbull Stadium; Attendance: 762; Referee: John Matto

May 17	FC Naples	1–1 (3–1 p)	Sporting JAX	Naples, Florida
5:00 p.m.	Cisneros 90+3'	Report	Al-Qaq 17'	Stadium: Paradise Coast Sports Complex; Attendance: 2,071; Referee: Mario Maric
	Penalties
	Ferrín (penalty scored); Mesias (penalty scored); O'Connor (penalty scored); Osorio (penalty missed)		(penalty missed) Jääskeläinen; (penalty missed) Edwards; (penalty scored) Neville; (penalty missed) Sadlier

June 6	Sporting JAX	0–2	Tampa Bay Rowdies	Jacksonville, Florida
7:00 p.m.			Cruz 35'; Myers 45+2'	Stadium: Hodges Stadium; Attendance: 869; Referee: Amin Hadzi

June 6	FC Naples	0–2	Sarasota Paradise	Naples, Florida
7:30 p.m.			Watters 11'; O'Dwyer 84'	Stadium: Paradise Coast Sports Complex; Attendance: 2,139; Referee: Lauren Aldrich

July 11	Sarasota Paradise	0–5	Miami FC	Lakewood Ranch, Florida
7:30 p.m.			Tunbridge 16' (pen.); Díaz 28'; Rocha 37'; Locadia 59'; Knutson 62'	Stadium: Premier Sports Campus; Attendance: 1,436; Referee: Atahan Ayaya

July 11	Tampa Bay Rowdies	2–0	FC Naples	St. Petersburg, Florida
7:30 p.m.	Henderlong 41'; Conway 44'			Stadium: Al Lang Stadium; Attendance: 4,928; Referee: Jorge Escobar

=== Wildcard ===
Pos	Team	Pld	W	PKW	PKL	L	GF	GA	GD	Pts	Qualification
1	Miami FC	4	3	0	0	1	11	5	+6	9	Advance to knockout stage
2	Charleston Battery	4	2	1	1	0	8	3	+5	9	
3	New Mexico United	4	3	0	0	1	8	5	+3	9	
4	Birmingham Legion FC	4	2	1	1	0	7	2	+5	9	
5	AC Boise	4	2	1	0	1	8	6	+2	8	
6	Detroit City FC	4	2	0	2	0	4	2	+2	8	
7	Brooklyn FC	4	2	0	1	1	9	4	+5	7	

== Knockout stage ==
Number of teams per tier still in competition
Championship	League 1	Total
6 / 25	2 / 17	8 / 42

=== Quarterfinals ===
August 12	Tampa Bay Rowdies	0–0 (3–5 p)	Louisville City FC	Tampa, Florida
7:00 p.m.		Report		Stadium: Al Lang Stadium; Attendance: 2,287; Referee: Joshua Encarnación
	Penalties
	Dolabella (penalty scored); Schneider (penalty scored); Nigro (penalty missed); Hilton (penalty scored)		(penalty scored) Totsch; (penalty scored) Donovan; (penalty scored) E. Davila; (penalty scored) Huerman; (penalty scored) T. Davila

August 12	Charlotte Independence	2–4	Hartford Athletic	Matthews, North Carolina
7:00 p.m.	Scarlett 73' (o.g.); Manin 85'	Report	Anaku 23', 36'; Obalola 52'; Williams 67'	Stadium: Sportsplex at Matthews; Attendance: 655; Referee: Ekaterina Koroleva

August 12	Spokane Velocity	1–1 (4–5 p)	Colorado Springs Switchbacks	Spokane, Washington
9:00 p.m.	Gil 14'	Report	Fjeldberg 30'	Stadium: One Spokane Stadium; Attendance: 972; Referee: Brandon Stevis
	Penalties
	Vinyals (penalty scored); Gallardo (penalty scored); Lewis (penalty scored); Brett (penalty scored); Covi (penalty missed)		(penalty scored) Perez; (penalty scored) Tejada; (penalty scored) Maples; (penalty scored) Masereka; (penalty scored) Bennett

August 12	San Antonio FC	2–1	Miami FC	San Antonio, Texas
8:30 p.m.	Parano 44', 64'	Report	Rocha 79'	Stadium: Toyota Field; Attendance: 6,092; Referee: Nabil Bensalah

=== Semifinals ===
September 8	Hartford Athletic	2–1	Colorado Springs Switchbacks	Hartford, Connecticut
7:00 PM EDT	Coffey 3'; Diz 37'	Report	Fjeldberg 82'	Stadium: Trinity Health Stadium; Attendance: 2,611; Referee: Muhammad Hassan

September 8	San Antonio FC	0–0 (7–8 p)	Louisville City FC	San Antonio, Texas
8:30 PM EDT		Report		Stadium: Toyota Field; Attendance: 4,757; Referee: Brad Jensen
	Penalties
	Taintor (penalty missed); Maldonado (penalty scored); Cuello (penalty scored); Ricol (penalty scored); Hernández (penalty scored); Parano (penalty missed); Barbir (penalty scored); Ward (penalty scored); Crognale (penalty scored); Haakenson (penalty missed)		(penalty missed) Totsch; (penalty scored) E. Davila; (penalty scored) Wilson; (penalty scored) Huerman; (penalty scored) T. Davila; (penalty missed) McFadden; (penalty scored) Morris; (penalty scored) Showunmi; (penalty scored) Dayes; (penalty scored) Dia

=== Final ===
October 4
3:00 PM EDT

Hartford Athletic	0–1	Louisville City FC
	Report	McFadden 12'

Trinity Health Stadium, Hartford, Connecticut
Attendance: 6,179
Referee: Elton García

== Statistics ==
=== Average home attendances ===
Ranked from highest to lowest average attendance.

Team	League	GP	Total	High	Low	Average
New Mexico United	USLC	2	18,994	9,605	9,389	9,497
Sacramento Republic FC	USLC	2	18,540	9,425	9,115	9,270
Louisville City FC	USLC	2	18,363	9,487	8,876	9,182
Rhode Island FC	USLC	2	17,584	10,554	7,030	8,792
Indy Eleven	USLC	2	17,138	8,586	8,552	8,569
Athletic Club Boise	USL1	2	14,453	7,247	7,206	7,227
Detroit City FC	USLC	2	13,407	7,051	6,356	6,704
Portland Hearts of Pine	USL1	2	12,538	6,307	6,231	6,269
Phoenix Rising FC	USLC	2	12,529	7,002	5,527	6,265
Colorado Springs Switchbacks FC	USLC	2	12,403	6,311	6,092	6,202
San Antonio FC	USLC	4	21,954	6,092	4,757	5,489
El Paso Locomotive FC	USLC	2	10,053	5,042	5,011	5,027
Lexington SC	USLC	2	9,336	5,127	4,209	4,668
Pittsburgh Riverhounds SC	USLC	2	9,016	5,027	3,989	4,508
Orange County SC	USLC	2	9,016	4,608	4,408	4,508
Tampa Bay Rowdies	USLC	3	12,884	5,669	2,287	4,295
Richmond Kickers	USL1	2	8,303	4,881	3,422	4,152
FC Tulsa	USLC	2	8,153	4,953	3,200	4,077
Fort Wayne FC	USL1	2	8,008	4,214	3,794	4,004
Forward Madison FC	USL1	2	7,751	4,178	3,573	3,876
Charleston Battery	USLC	2	7,477	4,475	3,002	3,739
Oakland Roots SC	USLC	2	7,143	5,669	1,474	3,572
One Knoxville SC	USL1	2	7,049	4,702	2,347	3,525
AV Alta FC	USL1	2	6,117	3,206	2,911	3,059
Monterey Bay FC	USLC	2	6,005	3,605	2,400	3,003
Birmingham Legion FC	USLC	2	5,802	3,237	2,565	2,901
Las Vegas Lights FC	USLC	2	5,458	2,774	2,684	2,729
Greenville Triumph SC	USL1	2	5,007	2,876	2,131	2,504
Hartford Athletic	USLC	3	7,233	2,983	1,639	2,411
Union Omaha	USL1	2	4,389	2,348	2,041	2,195
Westchester SC	USL1	2	4,313	3,257	1,056	2,157
FC Naples	USL1	2	4,210	2,139	2,071	2,105
Loudoun United FC	USLC	2	3,487	2,260	1,227	1,744
Spokane Velocity FC	USL1	3	5,130	2,325	972	1,710
Brooklyn FC	USLC	2	3,236	1,977	1,259	1,618
Chattanooga Red Wolves SC	USL1	2	2,829	1,551	1,278	1,415
Charlotte Independence	USL1	3	3,913	2,545	655	1,304
Sporting Club Jacksonville	USLC	2	2,511	1,642	869	1,256
New York Cosmos	USL1	2	2,199	1,159	1,040	1,100
Sarasota Paradise	USL1	2	2,119	1,436	683	1,060
Corpus Christi FC	USL1	2	1,743	1,128	615	872
Miami FC	USLC	2	1,583	821	762	792
Total	combined	88	352,098	10,554	615	4,001

=== Average home attendances by league ===
League	GP	Total	High	Low	Average
USL Championship	52	252,027	10,554	762	4,847
USL League One	36	100,071	7,247	615	2,780
Total	88	352,098	10,554	615	4,001

== Awards ==
=== Player of the Round ===
Round	Position	Player	Club	Reason	Ref.
1	MF	(Uruguay) Enzo Martínez	Charlotte Independence	2 goals vs. Richmond Kickers	
2	FW	(United States) MD Myers	Tampa Bay Rowdies	2 goals vs. Miami FC	
3	MF	(United States) Allen Gavilanes	Union Omaha	1 goal; 2 assists vs. Fort Wayne FC	
4	FW	(Jamaica) Neco Brett	Spokane Velocity	2 goals vs. Oakland Roots SC	

=== Goal of the Round ===
Round	Player	Club	Opponent	Ref.
1	(Portugal) Pedro Santos	Loudoun United FC	Charleston Battery	
2	(France) Louis Perez	Tampa Bay Rowdies	Miami FC	
3	(France) Ilias Aoumaich	AV Alta FC	Orange County SC	
4	(Honduras) Juan Carlos Obregon	Brooklyn FC	Rhode Island FC	

=== Save of the Round ===
Round	Player	Club	Opponent	Ref.
1	(United States) Jonathan Kliewer	Athletic Club Boise	Las Vegas Lights FC	
2	(United States) Hunter Morse	Portland Hearts of Pine	Rhode Island FC	
3	(Puerto Rico) Aurie Echevarría	Fort Wayne FC	Union Omaha	
4	(United States) Tristan Stephani	New York Cosmos	Portland Hearts of Pine	

=== Team of the Round ===
Player of the Round denoted in Bold.

Round	Goalkeeper	Defenders	Midfielders	Forwards	Bench	Coach	Ref.
1	(United States) Vitiello (SAC)	(United States) Foster (COS) (Puerto Rico) Cardona (ELP) (Brazil) Alves (BKN)	(United States) Epps (LEX) (Uruguay) Martínez (CLT) (United States) Borczak (OMA) (United States) Bowen (CRP)	(Mexico) Rodríguez (SAC) (United States) Amann (PGH) (United States) Henderlong (TBR)	(United States) Sutton (SAR) (Mexico) Alfaro (ELP) (United States) Akpunonu (CHS) (United States) Wolff (SAC) (England) Baker (KNX) (Malawi) Malango (SAC) (Honduras) Obregón (BKN)	(Colombia) Candela (OMA)	
2	(Greece) Tambakis (TUL)	(Japan) Yamazaki (DET) (Senegal) Mar Boye (PHX) (United States) Rocha (COS)	(United States) Spengler (NYC) (Cameroon) Moursou (PHX) (United States) Kelly (CHS) (United States) Bodily (ACB)	(United States) Wilson (LOU) (United States) **Myers** (TBR) (Uruguay) Guenzatti (NYC)	(Cameroon) Siaha (HFD) (United States) Suárez (SAN) (France) Perez (TBR) (Norway) Fjeldberg (COS) (Spain) Vinyals (SPK) (United States) Donovan (LOU) (England) Wright (POR)	(United States) Murphy (POR)	
3	(Ghana) Amedeka (SAR)	(French Guiana) Vancaeyezeele (BKN) (Spain) de Vicente (OAK) (Republic of Ireland) Watters (SAR)	(United States) **Gavilanes** (OMA) (United States) Cruz (TBR) (Jamaica) Lewis (SPK) (United States) Holstad (RI)	(Iceland) Úlfarsson (LDN) (United States) Stojanovic (BKN) (Germany) Tekiela (OMA)	(United States) Manske (MAD) (England) Craig (IND) (Cuba) Nodarse (RI) (Nigeria) Akinyode (LDN) (Republic of Ireland) O'Brien (IND) (United States) Anderson (BKN) (Sierra Leone) Williams (HFD)	(United States) Sanchez (NMU)	
4	(United States) Levy (CLT)	(Brazil) Mentzingen (DET) (Mexico) Romero (CLT) (United States) Sessock (LVL)	(England) Shashoua (BIR) (United States) Gil (SPK) (Philippines) Bailey (NMU) (United States) Bahena (AV)	(United States) Wilson (LOU) (Jamaica) Vassell (BIR) (Jamaica) **Brett** (SPK)	(Jamaica) Knight (GVL) (United States) Ai. Rocha (COS) (United States) Knutson (MIA) (Republic of Ireland) Molloy (LEX) (United States) Blancas (MB) (Northern Ireland) Carmichael (MAD) (Colombia) Ar. Rocha (MIA)	(United States) Heaps (BIR)	

=== Team of the Tournament ===
Goalkeeper	Defenders	Midfielders	Forwards	Bench	Coach	Ref.
(Cameroon) Siaha (HFD)	(United States) McFadden (LOU) (Mexico) Romero (CLT) (Cuba) Diz Pe (HFD)	(Mexico) Hernandez (SAN) (United States) Gavilanes (OMA) (United States) S. Williams (COS) (Republic of Ireland) Coffey (HFD)	(Norway) Fjeldberg (COS) (Colombia) Ar. Rocha (MIA) (United States) Wilson (LOU)	(United States) Levy (CLT) (United States) Miller (SPK) (Jamaica) Lambert (LOU) (United States) Davila (LOU) (United States) Spengler (NYC) (United States) Cruz (TBR) (Sierra Leone) A Williams (HFD)	(England) Bird (LOU)	
