= Bodily (surname) =

Bodily is a surname. Notable people with the surname include:

- Blake Bodily (born 1998), American soccer player
- Ritchie Bodily (1918–1997), British philatelist and stamp dealer
- Samuel E. Bodily (born 20th century), American professor
