= List of professional sports teams in Idaho =

Idaho is the 38th most populated state in the United States and has a rich history of professional sports.

== Active teams ==
=== Men's leagues ===
Baseball
League	Team	City	Stadium	Capacity
PL (Ind.)	Boise Hawks	Boise	Memorial Stadium	3,452
PL (Ind.)	Idaho Falls Chukars	Idaho Falls	Melaleuca Field	3,400
Ice hockey
League	Team	City	Arena	Capacity
ECHL	Idaho Steelheads	Boise	Idaho Central Arena	5,002
Soccer
League	Team	City	Stadium	Capacity
USL1	Athletic Club Boise	Garden City	Stadium at Expo Idaho	6,000

=== Women's leagues ===
Soccer
League	Team	City	Stadium	Capacity
USLS	Athletic Club Boise	Garden City	Stadium at Expo Idaho	6,000

=== Map of cities with a professional sports team ===
Location with a professional sports team

== See also ==
- Sports in Idaho
