= List of USL League One finals =

List of USL League One championship games and their finalists

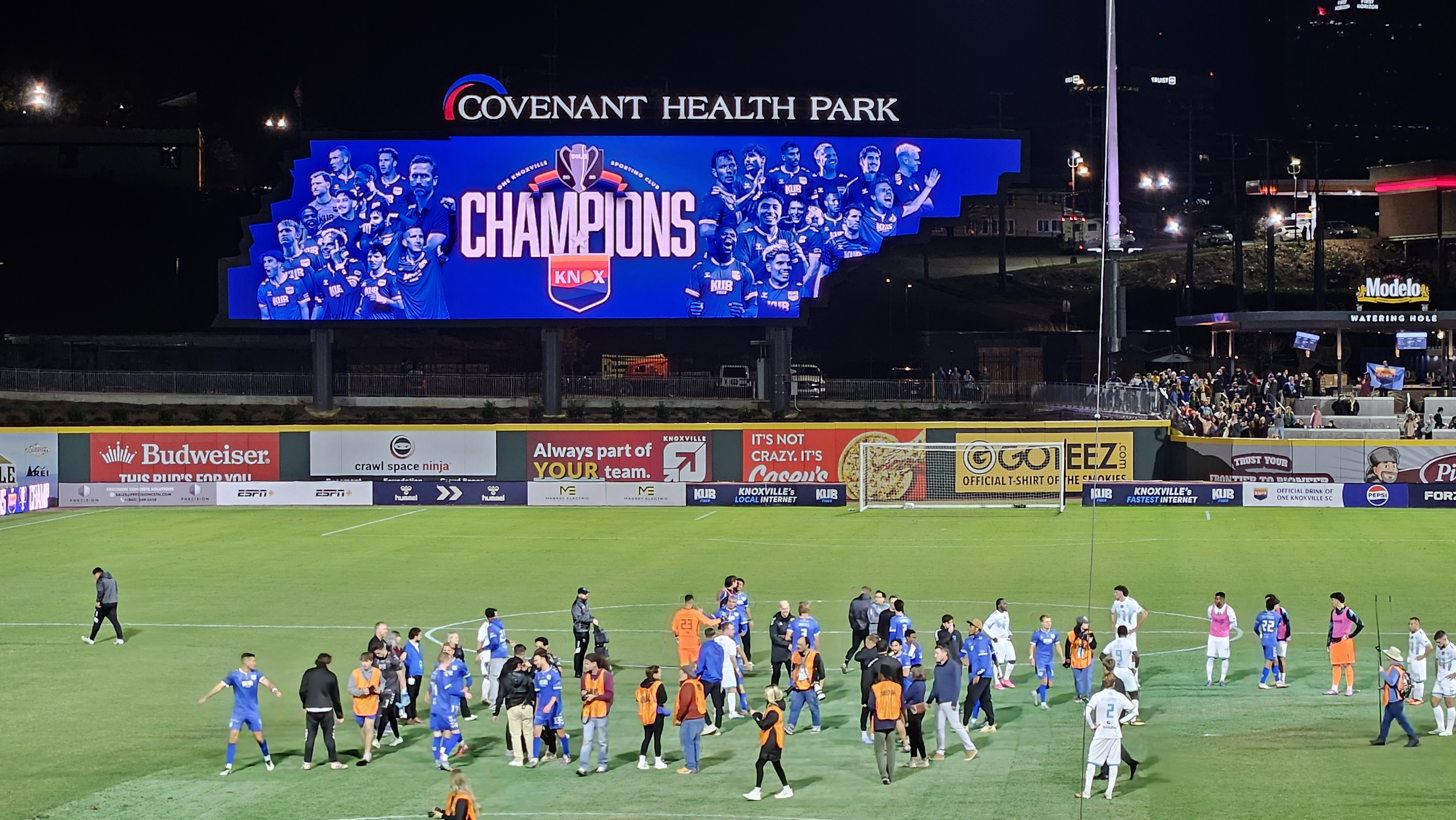
One Knoxville SC won the 2025 USL League One final.

USL League One is a third-division men's soccer league in the United States. The league determines its champion in a final match played at the conclusion of its season.

Charlotte Independence is the reigning champion, having defeated Athletic Club Boise in the 2026 final for their first title.

== Finals ==
Key
†	Match went to extra time
‡	Match decided by a penalty shootout after extra time
*	Match was cancelled.
§	Team also won the Players' Shield

Season	Champions	Score	Runners–up	Venue	City	Attendance	MVP	Ref.
2019	North Texas SC §	1–0	Greenville Triumph SC	Toyota Stadium	Frisco, Texas	3,245	Arturo Rodríguez (NTX)	
2020	Greenville Triumph SC §	Cancelled*	Union Omaha	Legacy Early College Field	Greenville, South Carolina	N/A	N/A	
2021	Union Omaha §	3–0	Greenville Triumph SC	Werner Park	Papillion, Nebraska	5,221	Damià Viader (OMA)	
2022	South Georgia Tormenta FC	2–1	Chattanooga Red Wolves SC	Optim Sports Medicine Field	Statesboro, Georgia	3,045	Kazaiah Sterling (TRM)	
2023	North Carolina FC	1–1 (5–4 p)	Charlotte Independence	WakeMed Soccer Park	Cary, North Carolina	4,487	Raheem Somersall (NCA)	
2024	Union Omaha §	3–0	Spokane Velocity FC	Werner Park	Papillion, Nebraska	5,849	Joe Gallardo (OMA)	
2025	One Knoxville SC §	2–0	Spokane Velocity FC	Covenant Health Park	Knoxville, Tennessee	7,500	Nico Rosamilia (KNX)	
2026	Charlotte Independence §	4–2	Athletic Club Boise	Sportsplex at Matthews	Matthews, North Carolina	3,326	Souaibou Marou (CLT)	

== Results by team ==
USL League One final appearances by team
Team (Note: Teams are listed by their official name at the time of their most recent final.)	Total appearances	Wins	Most recent win	Runners-up	Most recent loss
Union Omaha	3	2	2024	1	2020
Greenville Triumph SC	3	1	2020	2	2021
Charlotte Independence	2	1	2026	1	2023
Spokane Velocity FC	2	0	—	2	2025
One Knoxville SC	1	1	2025	0	—
North Carolina FC	1	1	2023	0	—
South Georgia Tormenta FC	1	1	2022	0	—
North Texas SC	1	1	2019	0	—
Athletic Club Boise	1	0	—	1	2026
Chattanooga Red Wolves SC	1	0	—	1	2022

== Stadiums ==
USL League One final venues
Stadium (Note: Stadiums are listed by their official name at the time of their most recent final.)	City	Hosts	Years
Werner Park	Papillion, Nebraska	2	2021, 2024
Sportsplex at Matthews	Matthews, North Carolina	1	2026
Covenant Health Park	Knoxville, Tennessee	1	2025
WakeMed Soccer Park	Cary, North Carolina	1	2023
Optim Sports Medicine Field	Statesboro, Georgia	1	2022
Toyota Stadium	Frisco, Texas	1	2019

== See also ==
- List of American and Canadian soccer champions
- List of MLS Cup finals
