= Nate Miller (soccer) =

American soccer coach (born 1986)

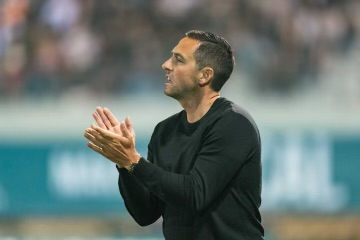
- Miller at the San Diego Loyal in 2023

Personal information
- Full name: Nathan David Miller
- Date of birth: February 24, 1986 (age 40)
- Place of birth: Jerusalem, Israel

College career
Years	Team	Apps	(Gls)
2004–2008	Taylor Trojans		

Managerial career
- 2010–2012: Taylor Trojans (assistant)
- 2013–2018: Spring Arbor Cougars
- 2015–2018: Lansing United
- 2018–2019: Lansing Ignite
- 2020–2022: San Diego Loyal (assistant)
- 2023: San Diego Loyal
- 2024–2025: Real Salt Lake (assistant)
- 2026–: Athletic Club Boise

Nathan David Miller (born February 24, 1986) is an American soccer coach who is currently the head coach of USL League One side Athletic Club Boise. He is known for his attacking, high-pressing style of play.

== Playing career ==
Miller played for Mechanicsburg Area Senior High School in Mechanicsburg, Pennsylvania. He then attended Taylor University in Upland, Indiana, where he was a four-year starting midfielder from 2004 to 2008. He was selected to the Mid-Central College Conference (MCC) All-Conference team in 2005 and 2006 and to the All-Region team in 2007. Miller served as captain of the Trojan soccer team his senior year. After college, he played central midfield for the Vikings AA semi-professional soccer league in Chicago, Illinois.

== Coaching career ==
=== Amateur and college ===
Miller began his coaching career as an assistant at Taylor University. He is credited with turning around Taylor University's soccer program from 14–23–1 in the two years prior to his arrival, to a three-year record of 40–19–2, including 2011's season where the Trojans were 19–2–1 and ranked 17th in the NAIA.

Miller served as head coach of the Spring Arbor University men's soccer team from 2013 to 2018, where he posted an 82-33-14 record and earned conference Coach of the Year honors. Simultaneously, he served as the head coach and general manager for Lansing United, a former member of the Premier Development League now known as USL League Two, from 2015 to 2018. Under Miller, in 2018, Spring Arbor had one of the best seasons in program history, leading to him becoming the conference coach of the year. His record with Lansing United was 20–13–12.

=== Professional ===
In November 2018, he was named head coach of USL League One expansion side Lansing Ignite FC. Miller led the club to a second-place finish in 2019 and an appearance in the League One Playoffs, finishing with a 13–8–10 record.

On January 8, 2020, it was announced that Miller would join Landon Donovan's staff as associate head coach with San Diego Loyal in preparation for the team's inaugural season in the USL Championship. Miller was promoted to head coach of San Diego Loyal on December 2, 2022, where he coached through the 2022-2023 season, leading the club to a 16-9-9 record and a spot in the 2023 USL Championship Playoffs. In August 2023 it was announced that the San Diego Loyal franchise would cease operations after the 2023 season, due to the recent announcement of the introduction of a Major League Soccer team to San Diego.

On January 16, 2024, Miller was officially announced as first assistant coach under Head Coach Pablo Mastroeni at MLS club Real Salt Lake.

On October 31, 2025 it was announced that Miller would become the inaugural head coach of USL League One expansion side Athletic Club Boise.

== Personal life ==
Miller was born in Jerusalem. At the age of 7, he moved with his family to Kenya. At the age of 13, he moved to Mechanicsburg, Pennsylvania. He has been married to his wife Darcy Miller since 2009. They live with their three children in Boise, ID.
