= Ritchie Bodily =

British philatelist

Ritchie Bodily (1 February 1918 – 13 November 1997) was a British philatelist and stamp dealer who was added to the Roll of Distinguished Philatelists in 1990.

Bodily formed an important collection of British illustrated envelopes and registered mail. He was an honorary member of the Royal Philatelic Society London.

== Selected publications ==
- British Pictorial Envelopes of the 19th Century. Collectors Club of Chicago, 1984.
