= Philip Mayaka =

Kenyan footballer (born 2000)

Personal information
- Date of birth: November 30, 2000 (age 25)
- Place of birth: Nairobi, Kenya
- Height: 5 ft 7 in (1.70 m)
- Position: Midfielder

Team information
- Current team: Athletic Club Boise
- Number: 66

Youth career
- 2018–2019: Orlando City

College career
Years	Team	Apps	(Gls)
2019–2020	Clemson Tigers	32	(2)

Senior career*
Years	Team	Apps	(Gls)
2021–2022	Colorado Rapids	0	(0)
2021	→ Colorado Springs Switchbacks (loan)	19	(0)
2022	Colorado Rapids 2	18	(3)
2023–2024	Crown Legacy FC	28	(0)
2025	Huntsville City FC	23	(2)
2026–	Athletic Club Boise	32	(2)
- * Club domestic league appearances and goals as of October 28, 2026

Philip Mayaka (born 30 November 2000) is a Kenyan footballer who plays as a midfielder for Athletic Club Boise in the USL League One.

== Career ==
=== Youth ===
Mayaka was scouted playing football in his local Nairobi by the general manager of the Montverde Academy in Florida. Mayaka had options to play in Norway, but opted to make the move to the United States. Whilst in Florida, Mayaka ended up playing with the Orlando City academy in the USSDA for a year, making 16 appearances and scoring 9 goals.

=== College ===
Mayaka attended Clemson University to play college soccer. In his two seasons with the Tigers, Mayaka made 32 appearances, scoring 2 goals and tallying 8 assists. In his freshman season, Mayaka was named Atlantic Coast Conference (ACC) Freshman of the Year, All-ACC First Team, All-America Second Team and a semi-finalist for the MAC Hermann Trophy. His sophomore season saw Mayaka earn First-team All-ACC and ACC All-Tournament team accolades.

=== Professional ===
On 14 January 2021, it was announced Mayaka had left college early to sign a Generation Adidas deal with MLS, which would see him enter the 2021 MLS SuperDraft. Going in to the draft, Mayaka was considered the consensus number one pick, however was selected 3rd overall on 21 January 2021 by Colorado Rapids.

On 29 March 2021, Mayaka joined Colorado's USL Championship affiliate side Colorado Springs Switchbacks on loan. He made his professional debut on 14 May 2021, appearing as a 73rd-minute substitute during a 4–0 win over Sporting Kansas City II.

On November 10, 2022, his contract option was declined by Colorado.

Mayaka signed with Charlotte FC's MLS Next Pro side Crown Legacy FC in January 2023.

On January 28, 2026, Mayaka signed with USL League One side Athletic Club Boise ahead of their inaugural season.
