= Joshua Yaro =

Ghanaian footballer (born 1994)

Josh Yaro
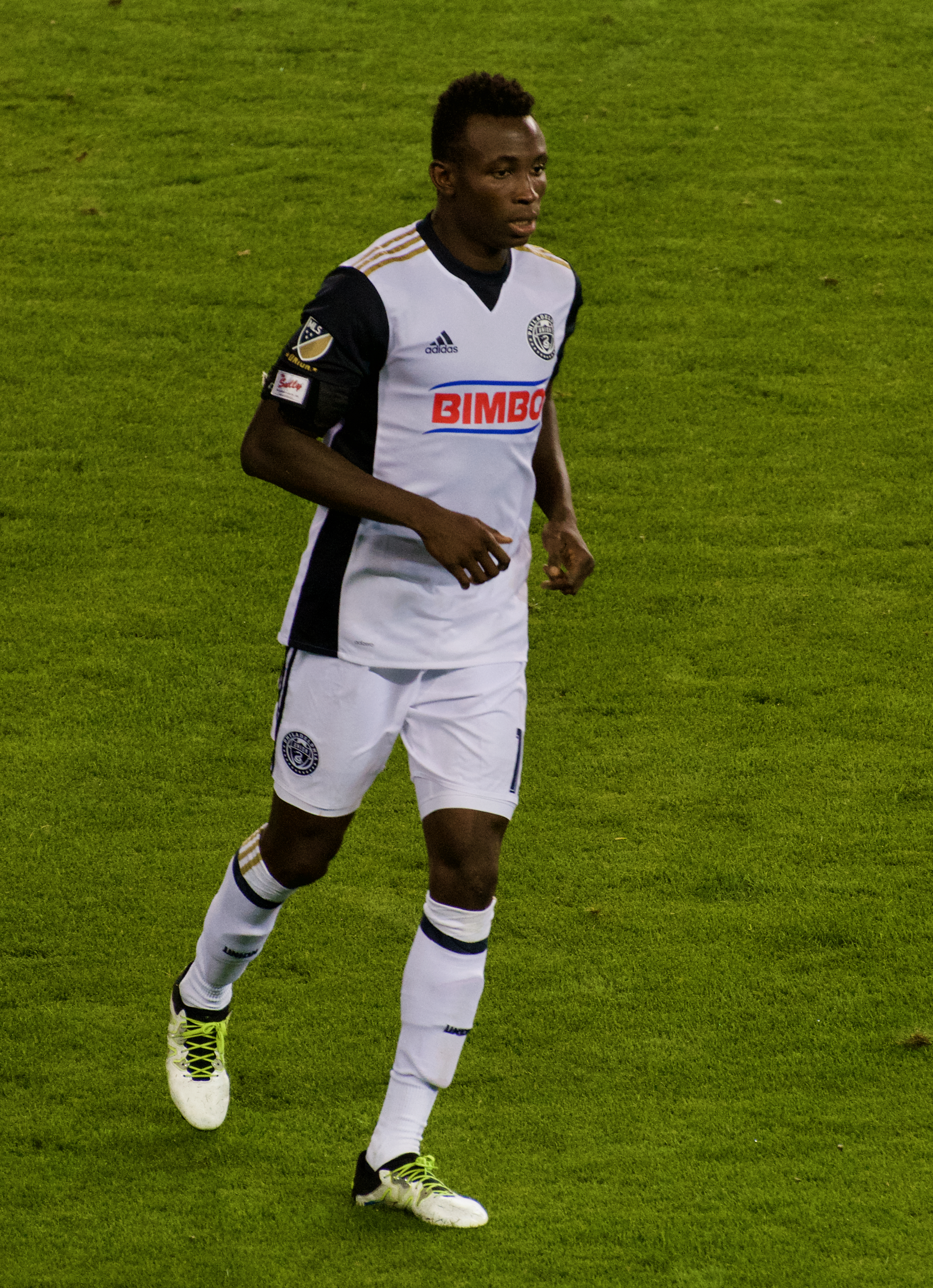

Personal information
- Date of birth: 18 November 1994 (age 32)
- Place of birth: Kumasi, Ghana
- Height: 1.80 m (5 ft 11 in)
- Position: Defender

Youth career
- 2009–2010: Right to Dream Academy

College career
| Years | Team | Apps | (Gls) |
| 2013–2015 | Georgetown Hoyas | 57 | (1) |

Senior career*
| Years | Team | Apps | (Gls) |
| 2014 | Baltimore Bohemians | 2 | (0) |
| 2016–2018 | Philadelphia Union | 23 | (0) |
| 2016–2018 | → Bethlehem Steel | 15 | (0) |
| 2019–2020 | San Antonio FC | 45 | (1) |
| 2021 | San Diego Loyal | 28 | (2) |
| 2022–2023 | St. Louis City 2 | 24 | (1) |
| 2023–2026 | St. Louis City | 47 | (2) |
| 2026 | → Athletic Club Boise (loan) | 19 | (1) |
- * Club domestic league appearances and goals

Joshua Yaro (born 18 November 1994) is a Ghanaian former footballer.

== Early career ==
Joshua moved to the United States on a scholarship to attend Cate School in Carpinteria, California where he played soccer. Yaro played three years of college soccer at Georgetown University between 2013 and 2015.

While at college, Yaro also appeared for Premier Development League side Baltimore Bohemians in 2014.

== Professional career ==
On 11 January 2016, Yaro was selected 2nd overall in the 2016 MLS SuperDraft by Philadelphia Union. He made his professional debut with the Union's USL Championship affiliate club, Bethlehem Steel, on 25 March, starting in a 1–0 win over FC Montréal.

Following his release by Philadelphia, Yaro joined San Antonio FC on 11 January 2019. After two seasons in San Antonio, he joined San Diego Loyal SC ahead of the 2021 campaign.

In 2022, Josh Yaro was signed to MLSNextPro team, St. Louis City 2 and was named their captain for their inaugural season. He later signed with the affiliate Major League Soccer team, St. Louis City SC where he currently plays as a defender.

In June 2026, Saint Louis City SC loaned Yaro to USL League One side Athletic Club Boise.

== Personal ==
Yaro earned his U.S. green card in July 2017. This status also qualifies him as a domestic player for MLS roster purposes.

== Honors ==
St. Louis City 2

- Western Conference (regular season): 2022
- Western Conference: 2022

St. Louis City SC

- Western Conference (regular season): 2023
