= Jesús Barea =

Spanish footballer (born 2002)

Personal information
- Full name: Jesús Rafael Barea Barroso
- Date of birth: 28 April 2002 (age 24)
- Place of birth: Cádiz, Spain
- Height: 5 ft 9 in (1.75 m)
- Position: Forward

Team information
- Current team: AC Boise (on loan from Real Salt Lake)
- Number: 36

Youth career
- 2013–2019: Cádiz

College career
Years	Team	Apps	(Gls)
2020–2024	Missouri State Bears	88	(34)

Senior career*
Years	Team	Apps	(Gls)
2025–	Real Salt Lake	14	(0)
2025–2026	Real Monarchs	23	(17)
2026–	→ AC Boise (loan)	13	(6)
- * Club domestic league appearances and goals as of 12:40, 28 October 2026 (UTC)

Jesús Rafael Barea Barroso (born 28 April 2002) is a Spanish professional footballer who plays as a forward for AC Boise on loan from Major League Soccer club Real Salt Lake.

== Youth and college ==
Barea was born in Cádiz, Spain, where he played with Cádiz CF's youth academy from age 11, scoring in all three seasons and helping the team win league championships in 2016 and 2018. In 2019, Barea moved to the United States, where he attended Putnam Science Academy in Connecticut.

In 2020, Barea attended Missouri State University, where he went on to score 34 goals and tallied 19 assists in 88 appearances across five seasons, including a truncated season due to the COVID-19 pandemic. In his freshman year, Barea earned 2020-21 MVC All-Freshman Team honors. He became a three-time All-MVC first team player, a three-time United Soccer Coaches All-West Region player and was named to the 2023 MVC All-Tournament Team. In his five years with the team, Missouri State won four regular season conference titles and three consecutive MVC Tournament championships.

Across his collegiate career, Barea is tied for second in program history in goals, third in points, and tied for sixth in assists. He is the program's all-time leader in shots, including 81 shot attempts in 2024 which is the third-most by a Bear in a single season. He is also second in career starts and tied for fifth in game-winning goals.

In December 2024, Barea was made eligible for the 2025 MLS SuperDraft.

== Professional career ==
On 20 December 2024, Barea was selected 19th overall in the 2025 MLS SuperDraft by Real Salt Lake. On 27 February 2025, Barea signed his first professional contract with Major League Soccer side Real Salt Lake, agreeing a one-year deal. He made his professional debut on 29 March 2025, playing the entire second half during a 2–0 loss to Minnesota United.

On 26 July 2026, Barea joined USL League One side Athletic Club Boise on loan for the remainder of the season.
