= Samuel E. Bodily =

American academic

Samuel E. Bodily is the John Tyler Professor of Business Administration at Darden School of Business, University of Virginia. He has Ph.D. and S.M. degrees from the MIT Sloan School of Management and a B.S. in physics from Brigham Young University. He teaches strategy and decision analysis in Darden's MBA and Executive Education programs. Bodily's area of research is decision and risk analysis, strategy modeling and analysis, forecasting and lifetime consumption and investment planning.

Bodily is the author of several books, a wide variety of scholarly articles in journals such as “Operations Research”, “Management Science”, the “Harvard Business Review” and well over 120 cases (including a couple of the 10 best-selling cases at Darden) and technical notes on quantitative analytics. Professor Bodily was granted the Distinguished Casewriter Wachovia award from Darden in 2005.

Bodily has been a consultant to numerous corporations, utilities and government agencies, including: IBM, United Technologies Corporation, Tennessee Valley Authority, and OGE Energy Corporation. Prior to joining the Darden faculty in 1977, he taught at Boston University and the Sloan School of Management at the Massachusetts Institute of Technology, and has been a visiting professor at INSEAD Singapore, Stanford and the University of Washington.

== Books ==
- Quantitative Business Analysis: Text and Cases, Irwin/McGraw-Hill, Chicago, (with Robert L. Carraway, Sherwood C. Frey, Jr., and Phillip E. Pfeifer), 1998.
- Accompanying Instructor's Manual published 1996, 566 pages. “Integration into the World Economy: Companies in Transition in the Czech Republic, Slovakia, and Hungary, ” (with Leslie E. Grayson), monograph RR-96-19 published by the International Institute for Applied Systems Analysis, Laxenburg, Austria, 165 pages.
- Quantitative Business Analysis Casebook, Irwin/McGraw-Hill, Chicago, (with Robert L. Carraway, Sherwood C. Frey, Jr., and Phillip E. Pfeifer), 1996, 279 pages. Accompanying Instructor's Manual published 1996, 566 pages.
- Modern Decision Making: A Guide to Modeling with Decision Support Systems, McGraw Hill, New York, 1985, 300 pages. Accompanying Instructor's Manual published 1985, 229 pages. ModelWare: IFPS Decision Models for the Manager, a user's manual with diskette of thirty five models (with Phillip E. Pfeifer), 1984.

== Selected articles ==
- “Preferences for Consumption Streams: Scale Invariance, Correlation Aversion, and Delay Aversion Under Mortality Risk, ” (with Casey Lichtendahl) Operations Research, accepted August 2, 2009.
- "I Can't Get No Satisfaction: How Bundling and Multi-Part Pricing Can Satisfy Consumers and Suppliers", (with Rafi Mohammed), Electronic Commerce Research, 6:187-200, 2006. Also published in Proceedings of 6th International Conference on eCommerce Research, Dallas, October, 2003.
- “Strategic Indicators of B2B eMarketplace Financial Success,” (with Tim Laseter), Electronic Markets (14:4) 2004.
- "Three Point Approximations for Continuous Random Variables", Management Science, May, 1983 (with Donald L. Keefer).
- "Optimal Consumption and Portfolio Strategies in a Discrete Time Model with Summary Dependent Preferences", Journal of Financial and Quantitative Analysis, March, 1982 (with C. C. White).

== Sources ==
- University of Virginia, Darden School of Business
- Harvard Business Review
- Bodily’s Business Educators Member Profile
