= Scott MacKenzie =

Scott MacKenzie may refer to:

- Scott McKenzie (1939–2012), American singer
- Scott MacKenzie (snooker player) (born 1980), Scottish professional snooker player
- Scott MacKenzie (footballer) (born 1970), retired professional footballer
- Scott MacKenzie (darts player) (born 1972), darts player from Hong Kong
- MacKenzie Scott (born 1970), author and co-founder of Amazon
