= Jake Dengler =

American soccer player (born 1999)

Personal information
- Date of birth: October 14, 1998 (age 28)
- Place of birth: Baltimore, Maryland, United States
- Height: 6 ft 5 in (1.96 m)
- Position: Defender

Team information
- Current team: Athletic Club Boise
- Number: 25

Youth career
- –2016: Pipeline SC
- 2016–2017: Baltimore Armour

College career
Years	Team	Apps	(Gls)
2017	CCBC Essex Knights	20	(11)
2018	Loyola Greyhounds	16	(1)
2019	UConn Huskies	16	(2)

Senior career*
Years	Team	Apps	(Gls)
2018–2019	FC Baltimore Christos	17	(4)
2020	Loudoun United	0	(0)
2021	Maryland Bobcats	23	(0)
2022–2024	South Georgia Tormenta	63	(4)
2025	FC Naples	27	(1)
2026–	Athletic Club Boise	29	(0)
- * Club domestic league appearances and goals as of October 28, 2026

Jake Dengler (born October 14, 1999) is an American soccer player who plays as a defender for Athletic Club Boise in USL League One and for the Harrisburg Heat in the Major Arena Soccer League.

== Career ==
=== Youth, College & Amateur ===
Dengler attended The John Carroll School, and played club soccer for both Pipeline Soccer Club and later for Baltimore Armour, winning the USYSA State Cup, Regional and National Champion with Pipeline in 2016. He was named to the 2016-17 USSDA Best XI and captained Armour to their first playoff appearance, scoring six goals in 26 games.

In 2017, Dengler attended Community College of Baltimore County to play college soccer. Dengler had a successful single season with the Knights, making 20 appearances, scoring 11 goals and tallying three assists, helping the team to All Region XX Championship and Maryland JUCO Championship. Dengler was also named NJCAA All-America, United Soccer Coaches All-East Region First Team, Region XX First Team and Maryland JUCO First team honors in his freshman season.

Dengler transferred to Loyola University Maryland in 2018, making 16 appearances and scoring one goal. 2019 saw Dengler transfer again, this time to the University of Connecticut, going to make another 16 college appearances and scoring two goals.

While at college, Dengler played in the National Premier Soccer League for FC Baltimore Christos, scoring four goals in 17 appearances over both the 2018 and 2019 seasons.

=== Professional ===
On January 13, 2020, Dengler signed his first professional contract, joining USL Championship club Loudoun United ahead of their 2020 season. Dengler was named to the bench on August 2, 2020, in a game against Philadelphia Union II, but never made an appearance for the club.

Dengler joined NISA club Maryland Bobcats, making 23 appearances for the club and was named the club's Most Valuable Player.

On January 28, 2022, Dengler signed with USL League One side South Georgia Tormenta.

Dengler signed with the Harrisburg Heat of the Major Arena Soccer League on August 29, 2024.

On December 16, 2024, it was announced that Dengler had signed with USL League One expansion club FC Naples as their third-ever player. He was named to the All USL League One second team for his great performance during the 2025 season.

On 10 January 2026, Dengler transferred to USL League One expansion club Athletic Club Boise.
