= Nick Moon =

American soccer player (born 1996)

Personal information
- Date of birth: May 31, 1996 (age 30)
- Place of birth: Waukesha, Wisconsin, United States
- Height: 1.85 m (6 ft 1 in)
- Positions: Full back; winger

Team information
- Current team: Athletic Club Boise
- Number: 14

College career
Years	Team	Apps	(Gls)
2014–2017	Milwaukee Panthers	71	(12)

Senior career*
Years	Team	Apps	(Gls)
2016	Fresno Fuego	6	(1)
2017–2018	Lane United	24	(12)
2019	Lansing Ignite	28	(6)
2020–2021	Indy Eleven	45	(5)
2022–2023	San Diego Loyal	47	(3)
2024–2025	Tampa Bay Rowdies	31	(2)
2026–	Athletic Club Boise	31	(7)
- * Club domestic league appearances and goals as of October 28, 2026

Nick Moon (born May 31, 1996) is an American soccer player who plays as a winger and fullback for Athletic Club Boise in USL League One.

== Career ==
=== Collegiate and amateur career ===
Moon played college soccer at the University of Wisconsin–Milwaukee. He was a four-year starter with the team and made over 71 appearances for them. During his time with the Milwaukee Panthers he was one of the most dynamic offensive players in the Horizon League and was named to the All-Great Lakes Regional Teams. While in college, Moon also played for Lane United, a USL League Two team in Oregon. He played two seasons with the team and made 24 appearances, scoring 12 goals.

=== Professional career ===
Moon signed his first professional contract with Lansing Ignite after impressing the team's coaching staff at one of their open tryouts. In his first season with the club he was considered one of USL League One's standout defensive players, while also maintaining an attacking threat. Leading into the league playoffs, Moon was one of the team's leaders in appearances.

In December 2019, Moon joined USL Championship side Indy Eleven.

Moon moved to USL Championship club San Diego Loyal on January 7, 2022.

Following the demise of San Diego Loyal, Moon later joined USL Championship side Tampa Bay Rowdies ahead of their 2024 season.

On 9 January 2026, Moon joined expansion club, Athletic Club Boise in USL League One ahead of their inaugural season.
