= Denys Kostyshyn =

Ukrainian footballer (born 1997)

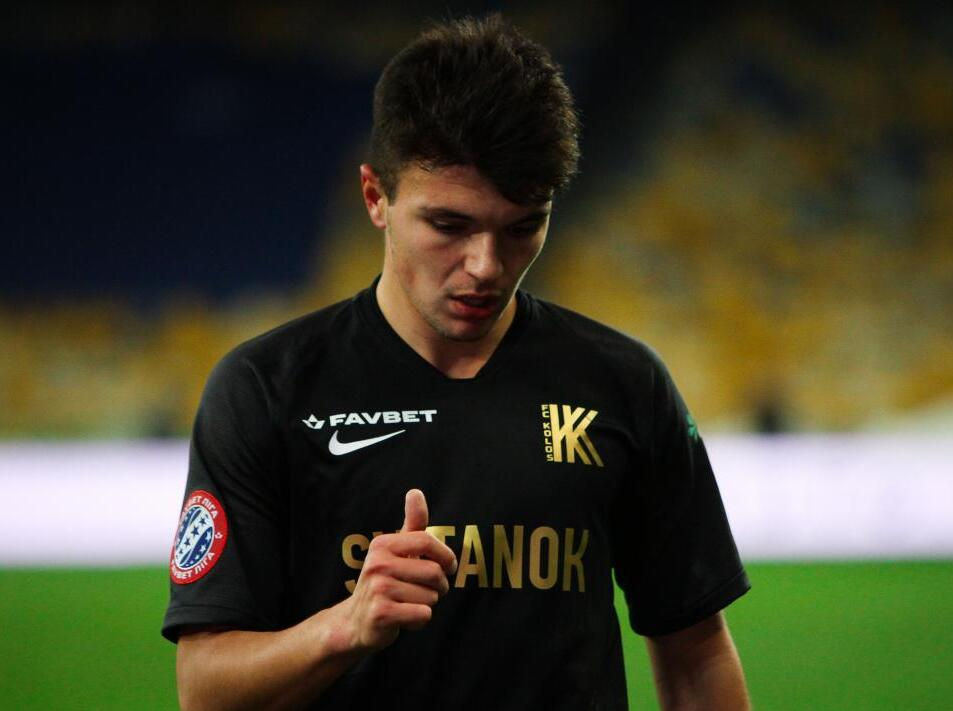
- Kostyshyn with Kolos Kovalivka in 2021

Personal information
- Full name: Denys Ruslanovych Kostyshyn
- Date of birth: 31 August 1997 (age 29)
- Place of birth: Khmelnytskyi, Ukraine
- Height: 1.78 m (5 ft 10 in)
- Position: Attacking midfielder

Team information
- Current team: Athletic Club Boise
- Number: 10

Youth career
- 2006–2014: Dynamo Kyiv

Senior career*
Years	Team	Apps	(Gls)
2014–2018	Dnipro	32	(7)
2018–2021	Kolos Kovalivka	74	(12)
2022–2023	Oleksandriya	3	(1)
2023	El Paso Locomotive	33	(4)
2024–2025	Oleksandriya	17	(1)
2025	Drita	15	(3)
2026–	Athletic Club Boise	32	(8)

International career^{‡}
2015	Ukraine U18	2	(0)
2016	Ukraine U19	1	(0)
2019	Ukraine (students)		
- * Club domestic league appearances and goals as of 27 October 2026 ‡ National team caps and goals as of 9 March 2016

Denys Ruslanovych Kostyshyn (Ukrainian: Денис Русланович Костишин; born 31 August 1997) is a Ukrainian professional footballer who plays as an attacking midfielder for USL League One club Athletic Club Boise.

== Career ==
A product of the Dynamo Kyiv academy, Kostyshyn joined Dnipro in August 2014.

He made his professional debut for Dnipro on 30 April 2017, in a Ukrainian Premier League match against FC Volyn Lutsk.

On 5 December 2022, it was announced that Kostyshyn would join USL Championship side El Paso Locomotive for their 2023 season. Kostyshyn was awarded the Fan's Offensive Player of the Year Award, was named to the league Team of the Week three times, and won the league's Goal of the Week once. On 1 November 2023, it was announced that he would be departing El Paso ahead of the 2024 season.

In 2025, Kostyshyn signed for FC Drita. In 2026, he signed for Athletic Club Boise in USL League One ahead of their inaugural season.

== Personal life ==
Kostyshyn is a son of Ukrainian retired footballer Ruslan Kostyshyn. His younger brother, Danylo, is also a footballer.

Kostyshyn is in a relationship with Ukrainian actress Yelyzaveta Vasylenko.
