= Dominic Gasso =

American soccer player (born 2003)

Personal information
- Date of birth: August 18, 2003 (age 23)
- Place of birth: Grand Blanc, Michigan, U.S.
- Height: 1.85 m (6 ft 1 in)
- Position: Midfielder

Team information
- Current team: Athletic Club Boise
- Number: 8

Youth career
- 2019–2020: Vardar Academy
- 2021: Flint City Bucks
- 2022: Detroit City

Senior career*
| Years | Team | Apps | (Gls) |
| 2022–2025 | Detroit City | 33 | (1) |
| 2024 | → Huntsville City (loan) | 9 | (0) |
| 2026– | AC Boise | 27 | (1) |
- * Club domestic league appearances and goals as of October 28, 2026

Dominic Gasso (born August 18, 2003) is an American soccer player who plays as a midfielder for USL League One club AC Boise.

== Career ==
=== Early career ===
Gasso played soccer at Grand Blanc High School before graduating in 2022. During his high school years, he was also a member of the Vardar Academy U16/17 team from 2019 to 2020, and the Flint City Bucks Academy team in 2021.

=== Detroit City ===
In 2022, Gasso joined the Detroit City FC U19 Academy team and competed in the USL Academy Cup in March. On July 4, 2022, the club announced that he would be joining the first team in the USL Championship on an academy contract, the club's second such contract, for the remainder of the 2022 season. Prior to the 2023 season, he was signed to a full year academy contract.

Near midway through the 2023 season, on June 30, 2023, Gasso signed his first professional contract with Detroit City FC, as the club's first player to be signed to a professional contract from the academy system. His contract was also a record for the longest in the history of the club at 4 1/2 years, including the remainder of the 2023 season through 2025, with options for 2026 and 2027.

Gasso scored his first professional goal on October 21, 2023, against Pittsburgh Riverhounds SC in the first round of the 2023 USL Championship Playoffs, the only goal scored in the game and the game-winner for Detroit City FC's first ever playoff win in the USL Championship.
