= Tumi Moshobane =

South African soccer player (born 1994)

Personal information
- Full name: Itumeleng Robinson Moshobane
- Date of birth: 17 September 1994 (age 32)
- Place of birth: Soweto, South Africa
- Height: 1.78 m (5 ft 10 in)
- Positions: Midfielder; forward

Team information
- Current team: Athletic Club Boise
- Number: 11

Youth career
- –2013: Kaizer Chiefs

College career
Years	Team	Apps	(Gls)
2015	Kankakee Cavaliers	4	(1)
2016–2018	Olivet Nazarene Tigers	40	(17)

Senior career*
Years	Team	Apps	(Gls)
2013–2014	Kaizer Chiefs		
2017	Lansing United		
2018	Charlotte Eagles	10	(3)
2019	Lansing Ignite	26	(10)
2020–2023	San Diego Loyal	113	(25)
2024–2025	El Paso Locomotive	43	(1)
2025	Charlotte Independence	15	(0)
2026–	Athletic Club Boise	30	(8)
- * Club domestic league appearances and goals as of 12:47, 28 October 2026 (UTC)

Itumeleng Robinson Moshobane (born 17 September 1994), known as Tumi Moshobane, is a South African professional soccer player who plays as a midfielder for Athletic Club Boise in the USL League One.

== Career ==
=== College ===
On 31 August 2015, Moshobane debuted for NJCAA side Kankakee Cavaliers. In 2016, he moved to Olivet Nazarene University. Having been redshirted for the 2016 NAIA season, he earned honourable mentions for the 2017 and 2018 NAIA Men's Soccer All-America teams.

=== Professional ===
Moshobane signed his first professional contract with USL League One's Lansing Ignite and was named to the 2019 USL League One All-League First Team. Moshobane moved to USL Championship club San Diego Loyal in 2023, re-signing with San Diego in December 2021.

The Loyal folded following the 2023 USL Championship season and Moshobane signed for El Paso Locomotive on 13 December 2023.

On 9 July 2025, Moshobane joined USL League One side Charlotte Independence.

On 15 January 2026, Moshobane signed for USL League One expansion club Athletic Club Boise.
