= Stadium at Expo Idaho =

Soccer in Garden City, Idaho

- Location within the United States Location within Idaho
- Interactive map of Stadium at Expo Idaho
- Former names: Les Bois Park (horse racing)
- Address: 12 N. Paddock Drive
- Location: Garden City, Idaho, U.S.
- Coordinates: 43.6506°N 116.2725°W
- Elevation: 2,680 feet (820 m) AMSL
- Owner: Ada County
- Operator: Expo Sports and Entertainment
- Capacity: 8,003
- Surface: FieldTurf
- Record attendance: 8,003 (November 7, 2026 - AC Boise vs Chattanooga Red Wolves SC)
- Acreage: 27.5 acres (11.1 ha)

Construction
- Groundbreaking: March 27, 2025
- Opened: April 4, 2026; 7 months ago
- Cost: $42,000,000
- Architect: The Land Group
- Builder: Lurre Construction

Tenants
- AC Boise (USL1) 2026–present AC Boise Women (USLS) 2027–future

The Stadium at Expo Idaho is a soccer-specific stadium in Garden City, Idaho, adjacent to Boise. The home field of Athletic Club Boise of the USL League One, it has a seating capacity of 8,003, with the ability to expand to 15,000 with renovations.

== Site history ==
The Boise Fairgrounds Track opened in May 1970 for horse racing, and was renamed Les Bois Park three years later. Located just across the Boise River from the city of Boise, the horse race track was built for both thoroughbred and quarter-horse racing. Its six-furlong (0.75-mile (1.2 km)) oval and covered grandstand hosted summer racing continuously for almost forty years until August 2008, when the racing firm Capitol Racing cancelled their lease with Ada County on February 13, 2009, due to Capitol Racing's claims of an inequitable terms of the lease of the race track. The race track was reopened in the summer of 2011, where a new tenant, Treasure Valley Racing, took up the reins of hosting horse racing at Les Bois Park.

Following the return of horse racing at Les Bois Park, the next few years were filled with legal battles surrounding the legality of betting on horse races. The majority of the funding for the site resided in the legality of horse race betting, with the instant horse racing betting machines located on site having been legalized in 2013 by state legislature. However, public opinion began to sway against the legality of the instant horse betting machines, with the bill legalizing them being immediately repealed the next year, which caused conflict with Treasure Valley Racing, who renovated the site privately. With arguments on horse betting boiling over into debates brought up by the private owners of Les Bois Park on the possibility of similar horse betting machines on the tribal casinos of the Coeur d’Alene tribe, who were major advocates of the banning of the machines, the profitable horse gambling machines were banned state-wide in September 2015. Without the machines' money to help sustain the race track, on-site horse racing ended in 2015, and Les Bois Park officially shut down on March 19, 2016.

== Soccer development and construction ==
In the afterglow of the debacle with Treasure Valley Racing, Ada County officially declared the end of horse racing at Les Bois Park and Expo Idaho in November 2019, and began to net new development proposals for the Expo Idaho plot. Looking to bring back sports to the site, Ada County specified in a September 2024 posting that it was auctioning off Les Bois Park's grandstand and adjacent facilities to only developers interested in creating a 6,000-plus capacity venue for any sports. This offer was taken up by Boise Pro Soccer, the sole bidder in the following month's auction of the site, winning a thirty-year lease on the stadium for $150,000 per year. Boise Pro Soccer's plans included incorporating the old grandstand and the Turf Club into their new stadium, which would start with a seating capacity of 6,225, and be expandable to 11,000.

Construction began on the new soccer stadium on March 27, 2025, and its FieldTurf was installed in November 2025.

=== Opening ===
The stadium opened up on April 4, 2026, to an over-capacity crowd of 7,211. Joe Gallardo of the Spokane Velocity scored the first goal in the stadium's history. Following a successful start to the season in regards to fan attendance, AC Boise announced that the stadium would undergo a renovation following the 2026 USL League One season to expand the stadium's capacity to 10,000 in preparation for AC Boise's move to the second-division USL Championship in 2027.
