= Souaibou Marou =

Cameroonian footballer (born 2000)

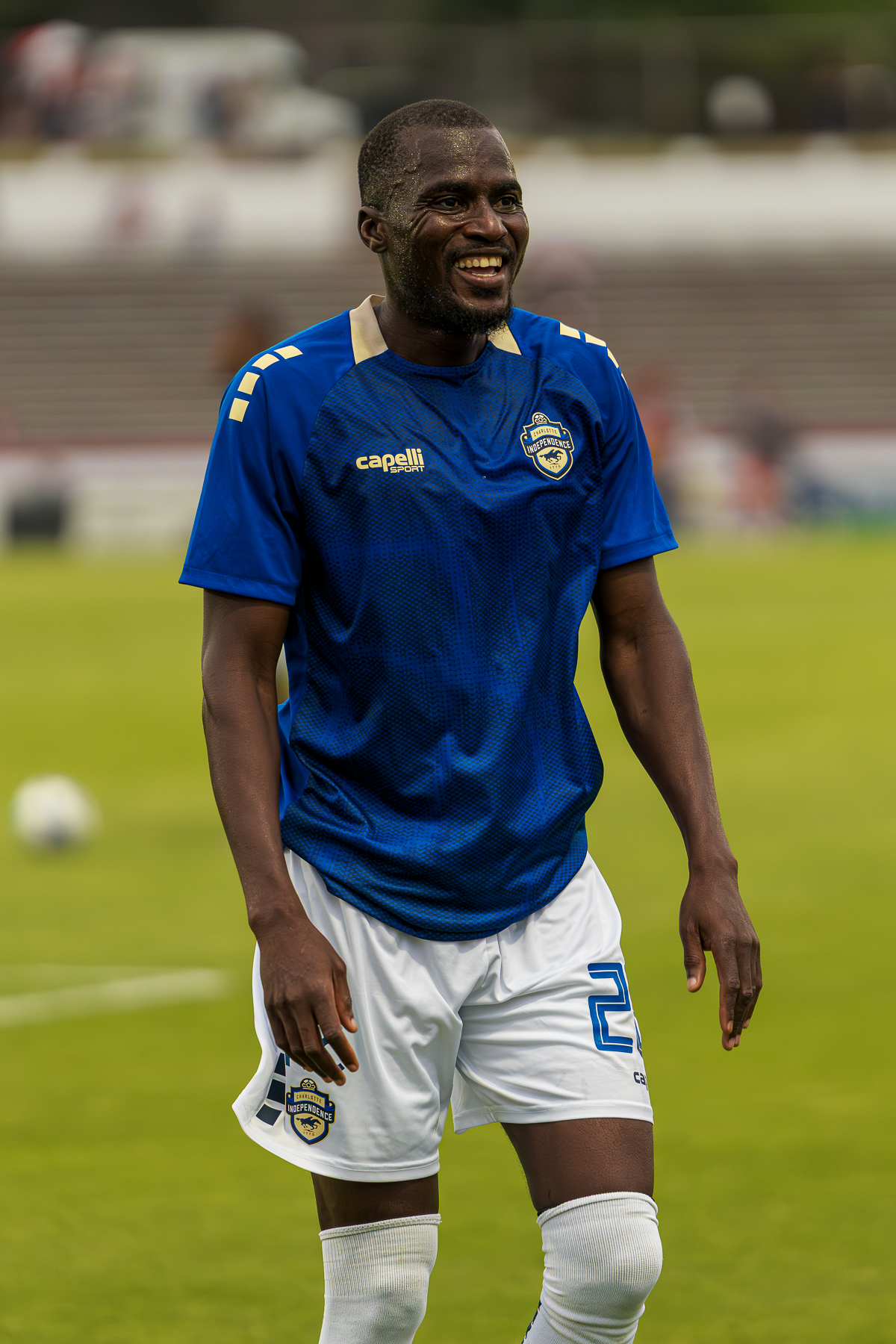
- Marou with Charlotte Independence in 2026

Personal information
- Full name: Souaibou Marou
- Date of birth: 3 December 2000 (age 25)
- Place of birth: Garoua, Cameroon
- Height: 1.80 m (5 ft 11 in)
- Position: Striker

Team information
- Current team: Charlotte Independence
- Number: 26

Youth career
- Coton Sport

Senior career*
Years	Team	Apps	(Gls)
2018–2023	Coton Sport	26	(8)
2023–2024	Orlando Pirates	7	(0)
2024–2025	Al-Shabab Club Manama		(0)
2025–	Charlotte Independence	59	(27)

International career
2022	Cameroon U23	3	(1)
2022–	Cameroon	3	(1)
- * Club domestic league appearances and goals as of 15:01, 31 October 2026 (UTC)

Souaibou Marou (born 3 December 2000) is a Cameroonian professional footballer who plays as a striker for USL League One club Charlotte Independence and the Cameroon national team.

== Club career ==
Marou started his career with Cameroonian side Coton Sport, helping them win the league and reach the group stage of the CAF Champions League. In October 2022, he won the Cameroonian men's Ballon d'Or for 2022 as the best Cameroonian footballer of the year. In November 2022, it was reported that Marou had reached an agreement to join South African club Orlando Pirates, though Coton Sport denied any contract had yet been signed.

On 14 March 2025, Marou signed for Charlotte Independence of the USL League One.

== International career ==
He represented Cameroon U23 for the 2021 Islamic Solidarity Games in Konya.

He was selected for Cameroon's 2022 FIFA World Cup squad. He had earned his first cap for Cameroon hours earlier, and was one of only two domestic-based players to be included in the squad.
