= Athletic Club Boise =

Professional soccer club in Boise, Idaho

- Full name: Athletic Club Boise
- Founded: 2024; 2 years ago
- Stadium: Stadium at Expo Idaho
- Capacity: 8,003
- Owners: Brad Stith, Steve Patterson, David Wali and Bill Taylor
- Head coach: Nate Miller
- League: USL League One (men's); USL Super League (women's)
- Website: acboise.com
| Home colors | Away colors |

Athletic Club Boise is an American professional soccer club based in the Boise, Idaho. It fields a men's team in USL League One, the third tier of U.S. men's soccer, and plans to field a women's team in the USL Super League, the first tier of U.S. women's soccer. The club was announced by USL on October 30, 2024, and made their USL League One debut in the 2026 season. AC Boise plays its home games at Stadium at Expo Idaho, a soccer-specific stadium in Garden City, Idaho. For the 2027 season, the men's team will be promoted to the USL Championship, the second tier of U.S. soccer.

== History ==
Boise was named a potential market for a United Soccer League team in the 2010s amid several friendlies and other matches that showed local interest. Jeff Eiseman, the owner of the minor-league Boise Hawks baseball team, stated that negotiations had been underway for several years with the league but never established franchise rights with the USL. A friendly match between La Liga club Athletic Bilbao and Liga MX club Tijuana in July 2015 drew an attendance of 21,948 at Albertsons Stadium, the football stadium used by the Boise State Broncos. A 2016 USL Championship match between Portland Timbers 2 and the Swope Park Rangers was watched by a sold-out crowd of 4,352 spectators at Rocky Mountain High School in Meridian, Idaho.

The "Boise Sports Park" proposal, which never came to fruition, was to build a multi-use baseball and soccer stadium for the Boise Hawks and a new USL team was announced in 2017. The stadium near downtown Boise would have had a capacity of 7,000 to 8,000 for soccer matches and use a turf pitch. The Boise Hawks' ownership group, Agon Sports & Entertainment, announced in January 2019 that it had signed a franchise agreement with USL to field a USL Championship team in Boise once the stadium was completed. The stadium was planned to be completed by 2021 if funding from a public development corporation was in place. The original proposed site for the Boise Sports Park drew opposition from local residents and was replaced by a new location in the West End neighborhood, but a voter-approved ordinance to require a citywide election on any sports stadium with public funding and financing issues led to the project being shelved in December 2019.

USL officially announced the expansion team under the working name Boise Pro Soccer on October 30, 2024. The ownership group included former National Basketball Association executive Brad Stith, real estate developer David Wali, former U.S. Soccer Federation executive Bill Taylor, and stadium developer Steve Patterson. Former U.S. national team goalkeeper and commentator Kasey Keller joined the ownership group in July 2025. Nate Miller was announced as head coach in October 2025. AC Boise announced the signing of their first player, former MLS defender Blake Bodily, on January 6, 2026.

The team won their first regular season match, on the road to fellow expansion team Sarasota Paradise, 1–0 on March 7, 2026. Midfielder Denys Kostyshyn scored the first goal in Athletic Club Boise history. The first home match was a 1–1 draw with Spokane Velocity FC that had 7,211 spectators—setting a league record. The team sold out their first nine home matches and set a single-match league attendance record of 7,247 spectators on June 20 against Union Omaha. On September 9, 2026, AC Boise announced that the men's team would join the USL Championship for the 2027 season, becoming a second-tier team. A new grandstand at the existing stadium would bring capacity to 10,000 spectators as part of the requirements for the new league. The women's team was originally planned to debut in 2027, but was delayed to the following year after the USL Super League changed to a new schedule format.

== Club identity ==
Athletic Club Boise was revealed as the team's name on June 27, 2025. The club's crest includes a lightning bolt shaped like a Peregrine falcon to represent local raptor conservation organizations. Its shape references the geography of the Treasure Valley, where Boise is located, and includes a star to represent the star garnet, Idaho's state gemstone. The club also uses several elements that are inspired by the city's Basque heritage, including a dark green named "Basque green" and the name, a reference to Athletic Club Bilbao.

== Stadium ==
The teams play at the Stadium at Expo Idaho, a soccer-specific stadium at the county fairgrounds of Ada County, near the Boise suburb of Garden City. The stadium incorporated the existing grandstand of the former Les Bois horse racing track and has a capacity of 7,225 seats. A 30-year lease agreement between AC Boise and the county government was finalized in February 2025. Construction was completed in March 2026, ahead of the USL League One season, and over 6,500 season tickets were sold by the club. The south side of the stadium includes a safe standing terrace for 494 supporters from the River Guard and a video scoreboard.

A second grandstand on the east side with 3,000 seats and a new press box is planned to be constructed ahead of the 2027 season to meet USL Championship requirements. The expansion to 10,000 seats was anticipated in the original design for the stadium. A new locker room and grass practice field are proposed to accommodate the future women's team that is scheduled to begin play in 2028.

== Broadcasting ==
During its inaugural season in 2026, the club's matches were primarily broadcast nationally on streaming service ESPN+. All home matches were broadcast locally on KTVB, which has over-the-air coverage in the Boise area. Several home matches were also broadcast nationally on CBS Sports Network and ESPN2.

== Club culture ==
AC Boise has an independent supporters' group, the River Guard, with over 200 members. It formed prior to the team's debut and occupies a standing-only section in the stadium.

== Players ==
=== Roster ===
As of September 12, 2026

Note: Flags indicate national team as defined under FIFA eligibility rules; some limited exceptions apply. Players may hold more than one non-FIFA nationality.

| No. | Pos. | Nation | Player |
|---|---|---|---|
| 1 | GK | GHA | Joseph Andema |
| 2 | DF | USA | Jonathan Ricketts |
| 3 | DF | USA | Keegan Oyler |
| 4 | DF | USA | Benian Yao |
| 5 | DF | SEN | Moussa Ndiaye |
| 6 | MF | ENG | Charlie Adams |
| 7 | MF | USA | Blake Bodily |
| 8 | MF | USA | Dominic Gasso |
| 9 | FW | BRA | Luan Brito |
| 10 | MF | UKR | Denys Kostyshyn |
| 11 | MF | RSA | Tumi Moshobane |
| 14 | MF | USA | Nick Moon |

| No. | Pos. | Nation | Player |
|---|---|---|---|
| 15 | DF | GHA | Joshua Yaro (on loan from St. Louis City) |
| 16 | DF | AUT | Jacob Crull |
| 17 | FW | CAN | Joseph Hanson |
| 18 | GK | USA | Jonathan Kliewer |
| 22 | FW | CMR | Thomas Amang |
| 23 | FW | USA | Omar Yehya |
| 25 | DF | USA | Jake Dengler |
| 27 | MF | USA | Jackson Stephens |
| 33 | DF | USA | Hayden Sargis |
| 36 | FW | ESP | Jesús Barea (on loan from Real Salt Lake) |
| 66 | MF | KEN | Philip Mayaka |
| 99 | GK | USA | Jared Mazzola (on loan from Las Vegas Lights) |

1. USL Academy Contract

=== Club captains ===
| Years | Name | Nation |
|---|---|---|
| 2026–present | Blake Bodily | United States |

== Team records ==
As of November 6, 2026

=== Year-by-year ===
| Season | League | Regular Season | | | | | | | | Playoffs | U.S. Open Cup | USL Cup | Top scorer | | Average attendance |
| Season | League | Pld | W | D | L | GF | GA | Pts | Pos | Playoffs | U.S. Open Cup | USL Cup | Player | Goals | Average attendance |
|---|---|---|---|---|---|---|---|---|---|---|---|---|---|---|---|
| 2026 | USL1 | 32 | 17 | 8 | 7 | 51 | 41 | 53 | 3rd | 2nd | Not eligible | Group Stage | | | 7,216 |

1. Top Scorer includes all goals scored in regular season, league playoffs, U.S. Open Cup, and other competitive continental matches.

=== USL Cup ===
| Season | USL Cup | | | | | | | | Play-offs | Top Scorer | | |
| Season | P | W | PW | PL | L | GF | GA | Pts | Play-offs | Pos | Player | G |
|---|---|---|---|---|---|---|---|---|---|---|---|---|
| 2026 | 4 | 2 | 1 | 0 | 1 | 8 | 6 | 8 | DNQ | 7 players | | 1 Each |
