= Blake Bodily =

American soccer player (born 1998)

Personal information
- Date of birth: January 13, 1998 (age 28)
- Place of birth: Eagle, Idaho, U.S.
- Height: 1.75 m (5 ft 9 in)
- Position: Midfielder

Team information
- Current team: Athletic Club Boise
- Number: 7

Youth career
- –2014: Boise Nationals
- 2014–2017: Portland Timbers

College career
Years	Team	Apps	(Gls)
2017–2019	Washington Huskies	37	(14)

Senior career*
Years	Team	Apps	(Gls)
2015–2017	Portland Timbers 2	35	(4)
2018–2019	Portland Timbers U23	4	(3)
2020–2022	Portland Timbers	12	(0)
2020–2022	→ Portland Timbers 2 (loan)	14	(4)
2021	→ San Diego Loyal (loan)	3	(0)
2023	San Diego Loyal	32	(5)
2024–2025	Tampa Bay Rowdies	52	(2)
2026–	Athletic Club Boise	22	(4)
- * Club domestic league appearances and goals as of October 28, 2026

Blake Bodily (born January 13, 1998) is an American professional soccer player who currently plays for USL League One side Athletic Club Boise.

== Career ==
Born in Idaho to parents of Scottish origin, Bodily began his youth career with the Boise Nationals before joining the Portland Timbers Academy in 2014. On June 29, 2015, he made his professional debut for USL club Portland Timbers 2 in a 2–0 defeat to Seattle Sounders FC 2.

In January 2020, Bodily signed a homegrown contract with Portland Timbers and forwent his senior year with Washington.

On October 1, 2021, Bodily moved on loan to USL Championship side San Diego Loyal. On October 19, 2021, Bodily was recalled by Portland.

Bodily made 17 appearances across all competitions for the Portland Timbers. During his time in Portland, Bodily was a part of the team that won the MLS is Back tournament in 2020, and well as the MLS Western Conference Championship in 2021.

Following the 2022 season, his contract option was declined by Portland. He returned to San Diego on a permanent deal on January 24, 2023.

Bodily ended the 2023 season with San Diego Loyal as their all-time single season assist leader with 9 assists and 5 goals on the season.

Following San Diego Loyal folding at the end of the 2023 season, Bodily joined Tampa Bay Rowdies for the 2024 season.

== Honors ==
Individual

- Pac-12 Conference Men's Soccer Freshman of the Year: 2017
- Pac-12 Conference Men's Soccer Player of the Year: 2019
