= 2025 Texoma FC season =

Texoma FC
- CEO: Simon Keizer
- President: Ben Watson
- Head coach: Adrian Forbes
- Stadium: Historic Bearcat Stadium
- USL League One: 12th
- U.S. Open Cup: First Round
- USL Cup: Group Stage
- USL Playoffs: DNQ
- Top goalscorer: League: Ajmeer Spengler (8 Goals); All: Ajmeer Spengler (8 Goals)
- Highest home attendance: 3,209 Texoma FC vs One Knoxville SC March 22
- Lowest home attendance: 216 Texoma FC vs Portland Hearts of Pine July 13, 350 Texoma FC vs Foro SC March 18 (US Open Cup)
- Average home league attendance: 1,272, 1,240 with USL Cup, 1,190 With USL Cup and US Open Cup
- Biggest win: Texoma FC 2–0 Forward Madison FC July 5
- Biggest defeat: Union Omaha 5–0 Texoma FC September 6
- All statistics correct as of 14:25, March 19, 2025 (UTC).

The 2025 Texoma FC season was the inaugural season in the club's existence as well as their first in USL League One, the third-tier of American soccer. It was announced after the season that Texoma would drop down to (pre-professional) USL League Two starting in the 2026 USL League Two season, and would serve as a development affiliate to 2027-hopeful USL League One expansion-side Rodeo SC, based in Celina, TX.

== Management team ==
Position	Name
CEO	(United States) Simon Keizer
President	(United States) Ben Watson
Head coach Sporting Director	(England) Adrian Forbes

== Current roster ==
As of July 5, 2025.

No.	Name	Nationality	Position(s)	Date of birth (age)	Signed in	Previous club	Apps	Goals
Goalkeepers
1	Mason McCready	(United States)	GK	January 5, 2003 (age 23)	2025	(Scotland) Partick Thistle FC	8	0
13	Javier Garcia	(United States)	GK	March 23, 1998 (age 28)	2025	(United States) El Paso Locomotive FC	9	0
26	Aren Seeger	(United States)	GK	November 19, 2000 (age 25)	2025	(United States) Memphis 901 FC	1	0
Defenders
2	Reid Valentine	(United States)	DF	(age 18)	2025	(Germany) Talentprojekt	16	0
4	Preston Kilwien	(United States)	DF	November 25, 1996 (age 29)	2025	(United States) South Georgia Tormenta	15	0
5	Angelo Calfo	(United States)	DF	November 4, 1998 (age 27)	2025	(Australia) Weston Bears FC	14	0
12	Jordan Chavez	(United States)	DF	February 28, 1997 (age 29)	2025	(United States) Orange County SC	15	1
16	Davey Mason	(United States)	DF	May 21, 1998 (age 28)	2025	(United States) Maryland Bobcats FC	11	0
22	William Perkins	(United States)	DF	March 15, 2000 (age 26)	2025	(United States) Michigan State Spartans	16	1
27	Patrick Staszewski	(England)	DF	September 9, 2005 (age 21)	2025	(England) Biggleswade Town	5	0
	Jorge Corrales	(Cuba)	DF	May 20, 1991 (age 35)	2025	(United States) Lexington SC	1	0
Midfielders
3	Ozzie Ramos	(United States)	MF	September 11, 1996 (age 30)	2025	(United States) Carolina Core FC	14	0
6	Leland Gray	(United States)	MF	April 9, 2005 (age 21)	2025	(Denmark) SfB-Oure FA U-19	5	0
8	Luke McCormick	(England)	MF		2025	(United States) West Virginia Mountaineers	9	2
10	Ajmeer Spengler	(United States)	MF	November 4, 2000 (age 25)	2025	(United States) South Georgia Tormenta	16	5
11	Dane Domić	(Canada)	MF	October 10, 1998 (age 27)	2025	(Croatia) NK Dugopolje	4	0
15	Phila Dlamini	(South Africa)	MF	February 26, 1999 (age 27)	2025	(United States) Lexington SC	6	0
20	Solomon Asante	(Ghana)	MF	March 6, 1990 (age 36)	2025	(United States) Las Vegas Lights FC	13	4
24	Jon Paul Jordan II	(United States)	MF	February 7, 2003 (age 23)	2025	(United States) University of Louisville	10	0
Forward
7	Brandon McManus	(United States)	FW		2025	(United States) Louisville	11	4
9	Diego Pepi	(United States)	FW	December 19, 2004 (age 21)	2025	(United States) FC Dallas	5	2
17	Maciej Bortniczuk	(Poland)	FW	September 6, 2001 (age 25)	2025	(Poland) Wisła Puławy	12	1
19	Donald Benamna	(Central African Republic)	FW	October 14, 1996 (age 29)	2025	(Morocco) Amal Tiznit	7	0
23	Teddy Baker	(England)	FW		2025	(United States) Hofstra	11	1
30	Lamin Jawneh	(The Gambia)	FW	October 31, 1995 (age 30)	2025	(United States) Georgia Lions FC	13	1
35	Brayan Padilla	(United States)	FW	February 11, 2000 (age 26)	2025	(United States) Foro SC	4	1

== Transfers ==
=== In ===
Date	Position	Number	Name	from	Type	Fee	Ref.
January 23, 2025	GK	1	(Scotland) Mason McCready	(Scotland) Partick Thistle FC	Signing	NA	
January 28, 2025	DF	12	(United States) Jordan Chavez	(United States) Orange County SC	Signing	NA	
January 30, 2025	DF		(Cuba) Jorge Corrales	(United States) Lexington SC	Signing	NA	
January 30, 2025	DF	4	(United States) Preston Kilwien	(United States) South Georgia Tormenta FC	Signing	NA	
February 3, 2025	MF	6	(United States) Leland Gray	(Denmark) SfB-Oure FA U19	Signing	NA	
February 3, 2025	MF	8	(England) Luke McCormick	(United States) West Virginia Mountaineers	Signing	NA	
February 6, 2025	GK	13	(United States) Javier Garcia	(United States) El Paso Locomotive	Signing	NA	
February 6, 2025	GK	26	(United States) Aren Seeger	(United States) Memphis 901 FC	Signing	NA	
February 11, 2025	FW	20	(Ghana) Solomon Asante	(United States) Las Vegas Lights FC	Signing	NA	
February 13, 2025	FW	30	(The Gambia) Lamin Jawneh	(United States) Georgia Lions FC	Signing	NA	
February 13, 2025	FW	7	(United States) Brandon McManus	(United States) Louisville Cardinals	Signing	NA	
February 15, 2025	DF	5	(United States) Angelo Calfo	(Australia) Weston Bears FC	Signing	NA	
February 20, 2025	FW	19	(Central African Republic) Donald Benamna	(Morocco) Amal Tiznit	Signing	NA	
February 25, 2025	MF	10	(United States) Ajmeer Spengler	(United States) South Georgia Tormenta	Signing	NA	
March 6, 2025	DF	22	(United States) Will Perkins	(United States) Union Omaha	Signing	NA	
March 6, 2025	MF	24	(United States) Jon Paul Jordan II	(United States) Sarasota Paradise	Signing	NA	
March 11, 2025	MF	3	(United States) Ozzie Ramos	(United States) Carolina Core FC	Signing	NA	
March 11, 2025	DF	16	(United States) Davey Mason	(United States) Maryland Bobcats FC	Signing	NA	
March 13, 2025	MF	23	(England) Teddy Baker	(United States) Hofstra Pride	Signing	NA	
March 13, 2025	MF	11	(Canada) Dane Domić	(Croatia) NK Dugopolje	Signing	NA	
March 15, 2025	FW	17	(Poland) Maciej Bortniczuk	(Poland) Wisła Puławy	Signing	NA	
March 15, 2025	DF	2	(United States) Reid Valentine	(Germany) Talentprojekt	Signing	NA	
March 17, 2025	MF	15	(South Africa) Phila Dlamini	(United States) Lexington SC	Signing	NA	
March 22, 2025	DF	27	(England) Patrick Staszewski	(England) Biggleswade Town	Signing	NA	
March 29, 2025	MF	25	(Canada) Damian Iamarino	(United States) Chicago House AC	Signing 25 Day Contract (Note: Initially signed to a 25 day contract, Damian was given a permanent deal on July 16)	NA	
April 11, 2025	FW	35	(United States) Brayan Padilla	(United States) Foro SC	Signing 25 Day Contract (Note: Initially signed to a 25 day contract, Brayan was given a permanent deal on July 11)	NA	
July 23, 2025	DF	36	(United States) Alejandro Padilla	(United States) Little Rock Rangers	Signing 25 Day Contract	NA	
September 11, 2025	MF		(United States) Lukas Cristales	(United States) Texoma FC Academy	USL Academy Contract	NA	
September 12, 2025	FW	14	(United States) Aldair Flowers-Gamboa	(United States) FC Cincinnati Academy	USL Academy Contract	NA	

=== Loan In ===
No.	Pos.	Player	Loaned from	Start	End	Source
9	FW	(United States) Diego Pepi	(United States) FC Dallas	March 4, 2025	December 31, 2025	

== Non-competitive fixtures ==
=== Pre-season friendlies ===
February 15, 2025	Texoma FC	v	Oral Roberts Golden Eagles	Sherman, Texas
				Stadium: Historic Bearcat Stadium

February 22, 2025	Texoma FC	1–2	North Texas SC	Sherman, Texas
		Report		Stadium: Historic Bearcat Stadium

March 1, 2025	Austin FC II	2-3	Texoma FC	Austin, Texas
				Stadium: Parmer Field

March 8, 2025	SMU Mustangs	0-0	Texoma FC	University Park, Texas
				Stadium: Washburne Stadium

== Competitive fixtures ==
=== Overall record ===
Competition	First match	Last match	Starting round	Final position	Record							
Competition	First match	Last match	Starting round	Final position	Pld	W	D	L	GF	GA	GD	Win %
USL1 Regular Season	March 22, 2025	October 25, 2025	Matchday 1	12th (out of 14)	30	8	8	14	35	55	−20	26.67
U.S. Open Cup	March 18, 2025	March 18, 2025	First Round	First Round	1	0	0	1	1	2	−1	0.00
USL Cup	April 26, 2025	July 26, 2025	Group Stage	Last in Group Stage	4	0	1	3	5	12	−7	0.00
Total					35	8	9	18	41	69	−28	22.86

Last updated: November 7, 2025
Source: Soccerway

=== Regular season ===
March 22 1	Texoma FC	0–2	One Knoxville SC	Sherman, Texas
7:00 PM CDT	Perkins (yellow card) 30'; Jordan (yellow card) 61'	Report	Doyle 24'; Brown (yellow card) 33'; Tekiela 57'; Haugli (yellow card) 59'; Johnson (yellow card) 63'; Zarokóstas (yellow card) 66'	Stadium: Historic Bearcat Stadium; Attendance: 3,209; Referee: Gloria Martinez

March 29 2	Texoma FC	1–3	Westchester SC	Sherman, Texas
7:00 PM CDT	McManus 4'; Chavez (yellow card) 55'; McCready (yellow card) 66'; Ramos (yellow card) 81'; Spengler (yellow card) 83' (yellow-red card) 90+4'	Report	McGlynn 31'; Adewole (yellow card) 45+5' (goal) 48'; Saydee (yellow card) 79'; Bolanos 85' (yellow card) 86'	Stadium: Historic Bearcat Stadium; Attendance: 1,367; Referee: Emmy Nonso-Ayakwo

April 5 3	Texoma FC	0–3	FC Naples	Sherman, Texas
7:00 PM CDT	Kilwien (yellow card) 37'; Chavez (yellow card) 44'; Asanté (yellow card) 45+2'; Ramos (yellow card) 71'; Jordan (yellow card) 82'	Report	Henderlong 30'; Evans 53'; Cisneros (yellow card) 57'; Torrellas (yellow card) 65'; Dengler 88'	Stadium: Historic Bearcat Stadium; Attendance: 854; Referee: Jaclyn Metz

April 13 4	Spokane Velocity	4–1	Texoma FC	Spokane, Washington
6:00 PM CDT	Waldeck 13'; John-Brown 55'; Peláez 62'; Jome 75'; Denton (yellow card) 86'	Report	Spengler (yellow card) 44' (goal) 60'; Padilla (yellow card) 64'; Perkins (yellow card) 67'	Stadium: ONE Spokane Stadium; Attendance: 1,755; Referee: Patricia McCracken

April 19 5	Forward Madison FC	1–1	Texoma FC	Madison, Wisconsin
6:00 PM CDT	Osmond (yellow card) 61'; Mehl (yellow card) 63'; Gebhard 90+5'	Report	Jordan (yellow card) 28'; Mason (yellow card) 65'; Padilla 73' (yellow card) 84'; Jawneh (yellow card) 79'; McManus (yellow card) 90+1' (red card) 90+1'	Stadium: Breese Stevens Field; Attendance: 3,463; Referee: Drew Klemp

May 3 6	Texoma FC	3–4	Charlotte Independence	Sherman, Texas
7:00 PM CDT	Spengler 22', 84'; Asante 29' (yellow card) 45'; Domic (yellow card) 87'	Report	Dimick (yellow card) 28' (goal) 53'; Chaney 43'; Ciss (yellow card) 45+2'; Midence 55'; Álvarez (yellow card) 62' (goal) 90+5' (pen.); Ndiaye (yellow card) 76'	Stadium: Historic Bearcat Stadium; Attendance: 907; Referee: Muhammad Kaleia

May 10 7	AV Alta FC	0–0	Texoma FC	Lancaster, California
9:30 PM CDT	Pajaro (yellow card) 75'; Kleiban (yellow card) 89'; Alaribe (red card) 90+5'	Report	Bortniczuk (yellow card) 32'; Valentine (yellow card) 38'; Mason (yellow card) 68'	Stadium: Lancaster Municipal Stadium; Attendance: 3,607; Referee: Steven Cardozo

May 17 8	Texoma FC	2–1	Union Omaha	Sherman, Texas
9:03 PM CDT	Spengler (yellow card) 2' (goal) 84'; Asante 26'; Kilwein (yellow card) 34'; Forbes (yellow card) 47'; Jordan II (yellow card) 66'	Report	Schneider (yellow card) 2'; Kilwien 87' (o.g.); Casciato (red card) 67'; Kallman (yellow card) 90+7'	Stadium: Historic Bearcat Stadium; Attendance: 679; Referee: Reyes Vargas

May 25 9	Texoma FC	1–0	Greenville Triumph SC	Sherman, Texas
3:30 PM CDT	Ramos (yellow card) 46'; Forbes (yellow card) 72'; Chavez (yellow card) 78'; Baker 90+6'; Perkins (yellow card) 90+7'	Report	Rankenburg (yellow card) 13'; Evans (yellow card) 27'; Wright (yellow card) 63'; Anguiano (yellow card) 67'; Agyaakwah (yellow card) 79'; Zakowski (yellow card) 90+8'; Gonzalez (yellow card) 90+9'	Stadium: Historic Bearcat Stadium; Attendance: 629; Referee: Cuauhtemoc Delgadillo

June 7 10	Richmond Kickers	1–2	Texoma FC	Richmond, Virginia
6:00 PM CDT	Kirkland 7'; Cela (yellow card) 65'	Report	Baker 19' (yellow card) 44'; Kilwien (yellow card) 70'; Asante 73'	Stadium: City Stadium; Attendance: 3,808; Referee: Servando Berna Rico

June 14 11	Texoma FC	2–2	South Georgia Tormenta FC	Sherman, Texas
7:30 PM CDT	Ramos (yellow card) 18'; Perkins 21' (yellow card) 45+1'; McCormick 45+3'; Baker (yellow card) 45+5'; Bortniczuk (yellow card) 73'; Spengler (yellow card) 90+4'	Report	Alves 9' (yellow card) 59'; Jiménez (yellow card) 24'; Walker 29'	Stadium: Historic Bearcat Stadium; Attendance: 2,657; Referee: Rachel Swett

June 21 12	Texoma FC	3–2	Charlotte Independence	Sherman, Texas
7:30 PM CDT	Spengler 45'; McCormick 66'; Forbes (yellow card) 79' (yellow-red card) 90+2'; Calfo (yellow card) 83'; Jawneh (yellow card) 90'; Asante 90+6'	Report	Jauregui (yellow card) 61'; Chaney (yellow card) 76' (goal) 90+2' (pen.); Ngah 76'; Romero (yellow card) 79'	Stadium: Historic Bearcat Stadium; Attendance: 1,019; Referee: Christian Ocampo Espinola

July 2 13	Spokane Velocity	1–1	Texoma FC	Spokane, Washington
9:00 PM CDT	Vinyals 45+2'; Lewis (yellow card) 90+4'; Waldeck (yellow card) 90+6'	Report	Bortniczuk (yellow card) 28'; Ramos (yellow card) 44'; Bortniczuk 64'; Garcia (yellow card) 68'; Pepi (yellow card) 90+1'; Clarvis (yellow card) 90+4'; Spengler (yellow card) 90+6'	Stadium: ONE Spokane Stadium; Attendance: 2,436; Referee: Ryan Farrell

July 5 14	Texoma FC	2–0	Forward Madison FC	Sherman, Texas
7:30 PM CDT	McManus 24'; Jawneh (yellow card) 69'; Chavez 77'; Ramos (yellow card) 87'; Dlamini (yellow card) 90+6'; Pepi (yellow card) 90+7'	Report	Mehl (yellow card) 45+2'; Sousa (red card) 45+4'	Stadium: Historic Bearcat Stadium; Attendance: 1,120; Referee: Brian Yip

July 12 15	Texoma FC	0–1	Portland Hearts of Pine	Sherman, Texas
11:30 PM CDT	McManus (yellow card) 1'; Forbes (yellow card) 21'; McCormick (yellow card) 49' (red card) 90+1'; Perkins (yellow card) 70'; Garcia (yellow card) 90+6'	Report	Perkins 5' (o.g.); Green (yellow card) 21'; Washington (yellow card) 25'; Quiñones (yellow card) 54'; Messer (yellow card) 90+3'	Stadium: Historic Bearcat Stadium; Attendance: 216; Referee: Gerald Flores

July 16 16	Chattanooga Red Wolves SC	1–1	Texoma FC	East Ridge, Tennessee
6:00 PM CDT	Knapp (yellow card) 10'; Ramos (yellow card) 17' (yellow-red card) 60'; Hernandez (yellow card) 23' (goal) 38'; Hernández (yellow card) 46'; Mackenzie (yellow card) 52'; Jérez (yellow card) 69' (red card) 90+5'; Bentley (red card) 90+10'	Report	Garcia (yellow card) 10'; Chavez (yellow card) 14' (goal) 90+4'; Ramos (yellow card) 23'; Calfo (yellow card) 45+4'; Pepi (yellow card) 90+5'; Dlamini (yellow card) 90+10'	Stadium: CHI Memorial Stadium; Attendance: 2,016; Referee: Shawn Tehini

August 2 17	Charlotte Independence	3–3	Texoma FC	Charlotte, North Carolina
6:00 PM CDT	Marou 14' (red card) 45+5'; Moreno 31'; Jauregui (yellow card) 45+7'; Ngah 60'; Ciss (yellow card) 88'	Report	Perkins (yellow card) 32'; Baker 39'; Forbes (yellow card) 44'; Chavez (yellow card) 45+1'; Valentine (yellow card) 46'; McCormick 72'; McManus 83'	Stadium: American Legion Memorial Stadium; Attendance: 454

August 9 18	FC Naples	2–1	Texoma FC	Naples, Florida
6:30 PM CDT	Garrett 23'; Cisneros 45+1'; Cerro (yellow card) 56'; Dengler (yellow card) 66'; Torrellas (yellow card) 86'	Report	Baker (yellow card) 58'; Spengler (yellow card) 69'; McCormick 90+1'	Stadium: Paradise Coast Sports Complex; Attendance: 3,065; Referee: Amin Hadzic

August 16 19	Texoma FC	0–1	Chattanooga Red Wolves SC	Sherman, Texas
7:30 PM CDT	Spengler (yellow card) 53'; Chavez (yellow card) 55'; Forbes (yellow card) 64'; McManus (yellow card) 75'; Perkins (yellow card) 84'	Report	Watters 10' (yellow card) 88'; Green (yellow card) 83'	Stadium: Historic Bearcat Stadium; Attendance: 1,630; Referee: Mark Verso

August 20 20	Texoma FC	3–3	AV Alta FC	Sherman, Texas
7:00 PM CDT	Jawneh 24'; Spengler 27'; Calfo (yellow card) 38' (yellow-red card) 54'; McCormick 46'; Chavez (yellow card) 61'; Garcia (yellow card) 90+5'	Report	Ávilez (yellow card) 34'; Alaribe (yellow card) 54'; Blancas 58'; Martinez 60'; Ramos (yellow card) 63' (goal) 89'	Stadium: Historic Bearcat Stadium; Attendance: 765; Referee: Gloria Martinez

August 23 21	Greenville Triumph SC	0–1	Texoma FC	Greenville, South Carolina
6:00 PM CDT	Corvino (yellow card) 12'; Bubb (yellow card) 81'; Robles (yellow card) 90+1'	Report	Spengler 8'; Garcia (yellow card) 11'; Jordan II (yellow card) 36'; Perkins (yellow card) 52'; Ramos (yellow card) 90+1'; Pepi (yellow card) 90+8'	Stadium: Paladin Stadium; Attendance: 2,174; Referee: Nicholas Strednak

August 27 22	Forward Madison FC	3–0	Texoma FC	Madison, Wisconsin
7:00 PM CDT	Viader (yellow card) 23'; Mehl (yellow card) 42'; Garcia (yellow card) 44'; Brown 83'	Report	Chavez (yellow card) 27'; McCormick (yellow card) 42' (yellow-red card) 90+5'; McManus (red card) 51'	Stadium: Breese Stevens Field; Attendance: 3,462; Referee: Jeremy Scheer

September 6 23	Union Omaha	5–0	Texoma FC	Papillion, Nebraska
2:00 PM CDT	Schneider 7' (yellow card) 48'; Bronnik 14'; Faz 49'; Milanese (yellow card) 82'; Barjolo 84'; Stéfano 87'	Report	Chavez (yellow card) 16'; Jordan (yellow card) 32'	Stadium: Werner Park; Attendance: 3,089; Referee: Carlos Rodriguez

September 13 24	Texoma FC	3–3	Spokane Velocity	Sherman, Texas
7:00 PM CDT	McManus 15', 50'; Spengler (yellow card) 30' (goal) 35'; Calfo (yellow card) 37'; Forbes (yellow card) 83'	Report	Brett 26'; Waldeck (yellow card) 41'; Gil 45'; Fernandez (yellow card) 57'; Crisler 65'; Veidman (yellow card) 90+4'	Stadium: Historic Bearcat Stadium; Attendance: 1,276; Referee: Melvin Rivas

September 21 25	Westchester SC	2–1	Texoma FC	Mount Vernon, New York
6:00 PM CDT	Bolanos (yellow card) 50'; Palma (yellow card) 54'; Obregón (yellow card) 65' (goal) 83'; Tetteh 67'; Facussé (yellow card) 90+7'	Report	Chavez (yellow card) 21'; McCormick (yellow card) 31'; Valentine 51'; Ramos (yellow card) 68'	Stadium: The Stadium at Memorial Field; Attendance: 1,192; Referee: Elvis Osmanovic

September 27 26	Portland Hearts of Pine	1–0	Texoma FC	Portland, Maine
4:00 PM CDT	Messer (yellow card) 4' (goal) 75'; Lopez (yellow card) 48'; Washington (yellow card) 59'; Poon-Angeron (yellow card) 76'; Morse (yellow card) 90+3'	Report	Ramos (yellow card) 25'; Forbes (yellow card) 32'; Perkins (yellow card) 81'	Stadium: Fitzpatrick Stadium; Attendance: 5,781; Referee: Alex Beehler

October 4 27	Texoma FC	1–1	AV Alta FC	Sherman, Texas
7:00 PM CDT	McManus (yellow card) 34'; Spengler (yellow card) 41' (goal) 74' (pen.); Jordan (yellow card) 68'; Perkins (yellow card) 88'; Ramos (yellow card) 89'; Baker (yellow card) 90+6'	Report	Cruz (yellow card) 34'; Cerritos 90+2'	Stadium: Historic Bearcat Stadium; Attendance: 1,182; Referee: Jay Schlesinger

October 11 28	Texoma FC	1–0	Richmond Kickers	Sherman, Texas
7:00 PM CDT	Valentine (yellow card) 3'; McManus 59'; Jordan (yellow card) 64'; Garcia (yellow card) 67'	Report	Schenfeld (yellow card) 46'; Howell (yellow card) 78'; Seufert (yellow card) 89'	Stadium: Historic Bearcat Stadium; Attendance: 1,576; Referee: Muhammad Hassan

October 19 29	One Knoxville SC	2–1	Texoma FC	Knoxville, Tennessee
4:00 PM CDT	Fuller (yellow card) 44'; Tekiela 56' (pen.); Diene 65' (red card) 71'; Haugli (yellow card) 68'; Zarokostas (yellow card) 75'	Report	Spengler (yellow card) 32'; Staszewski (yellow card) 45+1'; Valentine (yellow card) 51'; Baker 57'; Mason (red card) 71'; Ramos (yellow card) 77'	Stadium: Covenant Health Park; Attendance: 2,346; Referee: Drew Klemp

October 25 30	South Georgia Tormenta FC	3–0	Texoma FC	Statesboro, Georgia
6:00 PM CDT	Jiménez (yellow card) 17'; Vivas (yellow card) 19'; Kasanzu 19'; Bazini 60'; Tunbridge 68'; Nare (yellow card) 75'	Report	Chavez (yellow card) 15'; Perkins (yellow card) 17'	Stadium: Tormenta Stadium; Attendance: 1,079; Referee: Mario Maric

=== Lamar Hunt US Open Cup ===
March 18 First Round	Texoma FC	1–2 (a.e.t.)	Foro SC	Sherman, Texas
8:00 PM ET	Ramos (red card) 26'; Kilwien (yellow card) 44'; Spengler (yellow card) 45+3'; Chavez (yellow card) 45+7'; McManus 59'; Valentine (yellow card) 88'; Calfo (yellow card) 94'; Jawneh (yellow card) 113'	Report	Padilla 15' (pen.), 99'; Lara (yellow card) 41'; Kopetsky (red card) 43'; Robinson (yellow card) 104'; Rayo (yellow card) 120+1'	Stadium: Historic Bearcat Stadium; Attendance: 350; Referee: Reyes Vargas

=== USL Cup ===
April 26 Group Stage	Texoma FC	0–0 (5–6 p)	El Paso Locomotive FC	Sherman, Texas
7:00 pm CDT	Forbes (yellow card) 84'; Jawneh (yellow card) 85'	Report	Romero (yellow card) 14'; Twumasi (yellow card) 87'; Alfaro (yellow card) 90+2'	Stadium: Historic Bearcat Stadium; Attendance: 947; Referee: Jaclyn Metz
	Penalties
	Kilwien (penalty scored); Perkins (penalty missed); Padilla (penalty scored); Asante (penalty scored); Spengler (penalty scored); Ramos (penalty scored); Jawneh (penalty missed)		(penalty missed) Coronado; (penalty scored) Alfaro; (penalty scored) Ruiz; (penalty scored) Cabrera; (penalty scored) Ortíz; (penalty scored) Rodríguez; (penalty scored) Moreno

June 28 Group Stage	Texoma FC	4–5	Phoenix Rising FC	Sherman, Texas
7:30 pm CDT	McManus 7'; Pepi 26', 41'; Staszewski (yellow card) 43'; Jawneh 68'; Valentine (yellow card) 88'; Kilwien (yellow card) 90+8'; Perkins (yellow card) 90+8'	Report	Dennis 21' (pen.), 52', 71' (pen.); Johnson 24'; Cuello 90+6' (yellow card) 90+10'; Formella (yellow card) 90+8'	Stadium: Historic Bearcat Stadium; Attendance: 1,045; Referee: Corbyn May

July 23 Group Stage	Union Omaha	3–1	Texoma FC	Papillion, Nebraska
7:00 pm CDT	Faz 20'; Becher 44'; Kallman (yellow card) 44'; Navarro 51'; Holt (yellow card) 70'; Ostrem (yellow card) 72'; Knapp (yellow card) 90+2'	Report	Chavez (yellow card) 18' (yellow-red card) 28'; Pepi 35'; Forbes (yellow card) 88'	Stadium: Werner Park; Attendance: 1,849; Referee: Trevor Wiseman

July 26 Group Stage	Colorado Springs Switchbacks FC	4–0	Texoma FC	Colorado Springs, Colorado
7:00 pm MDT	Tejada 37'; Huerman 51', 90+3'; Clegg 79'; Foster (yellow card) 82'; Micaletto (yellow card) 87'	Report	Valentine (yellow card) 40'; Baker (yellow card) 73'	Stadium: Weidner Field; Attendance: 7,329; Referee: Benjamin Meyer

== Statistics ==
=== Appearances and goals ===
No.	Pos	Nat	Player	Total		USL1 Season		Lamar Hunt US Open Cup		USL Cup		USL League One Playoffs	
No.	Pos	Nat	Player	Apps	Goals	Apps	Goals	Apps	Goals	Apps	Goals	Apps	Goals
1	GK	(Scotland) SCO	Mason McCready	9	0	6+0	0	1+0	0	1+1	0	0+0	0
2	DF	(United States) USA	Reid Valentine	30	1	20+6	1	1+0	0	3+0	0	0+0	0
3	MF	(United States) USA	Ozzie Ramos	30	0	25+2	0	1+0	0	2+0	0	0+0	0
4	DF	(United States) USA	Preston Kilwien	20	0	15+1	0	1+0	0	1+2	0	0+0	0
5	DF	(United States) USA	Angelo Calfo	29	0	23+2	0	0+1	0	2+1	0	0+0	0
6	MF	(United States) USA	Leland Gray	8	0	0+4	0	0+1	0	3+0	0	0+0	0
7	FW	(United States) USA	Brandon McManus	28	8	21+3	6	1+0	1	2+1	1	0+0	0
8	MF	(England) ENG	Luke McCormick	22	5	15+4	5	0+0	0	1+2	0	0+0	0
9	FW	(United States) USA	Diego Pepi	19	3	3+12	0	1+0	0	2+1	3	0+0	0
10	MF	(United States) USA	Ajmeer Spengler	33	9	29+0	9	1+0	0	1+2	0	0+0	0
11	MF	(Canada) CAN	Dane Domić	4	0	0+3	0	0+0	0	1+0	0	0+0	0
12	DF	(United States) USA	Jordan Chavez	31	2	28+0	2	1+0	0	2+0	0	0+0	0
13	GK	(United States) USA	Javier Garcia	25	0	24+0	0	0+0	0	1+0	0	0+0	0
15	MF	(South Africa) RSA	Phila Dlamini	12	0	2+8	0	0+0	0	2+0	0	0+0	0
16	DF	(United States) USA	Davey Mason	18	0	11+7	0	0+0	0	0+0	0	0+0	0
17	FW	(Poland) POL	Maciej Bortniczuk	12	1	8+2	1	0+0	0	1+1	0	0+0	0
18	FW	(United States) USA	Aldair Flowers	5	0	0+5	0	0+0	0	0+0	0	0+0	0
19	FW	(Central African Republic) CAF	Donald Benamna	7	0	0+5	0	0+0	0	2+0	0	0+0	0
20	FW	(Ghana) GHA	Solomon Asante	13	4	10+1	4	0+1	0	1+0	0	0+0	0
22	DF	(United States) USA	Will Perkins	34	1	27+2	1	1+0	0	3+1	0	0+0	0
23	MF	(England) ENG	Teddy Baker	28	4	21+5	4	0+0	0	1+1	0	0+0	0
24	MF	(United States) USA	Jon Paul Jordan II	24	0	19+2	0	1+0	0	2+0	0	0+0	0
25	MF	(Canada) CAN	Damian Iamarino	5	0	0+3	0	0+0	0	1+1	0	0+0	0
26	GK	(United States) USA	Aren Seeger	2	0	0+0	0	0+0	0	2+0	0	0+0	0
27	DF	(England) ENG	Patrick Staszewski	11	0	3+5	0	0+0	0	3+0	0	0+0	0
30	FW	(The Gambia) GAM	Lamin Jawneh	31	2	15+11	1	1+0	0	2+2	1	0+0	0
35	FW	(United States) USA	Brayan Padilla	19	1	3+13	1	0+0	0	1+2	0	0+0	0
36	DF	(United States) USA	Alejandro Padilla	2	0	0+0	0	0+0	0	2+0	0	0+0	0
	DF	(Cuba) CUB	Jorge Corrales	0	0	0+0	0	0+0	0	0+0	0	0+0	0
	MF	(United States) USA	Lukas Cristales	0	0	0+0	0	0+0	0	0+0	0	0+0	0

- Last updated: October 25, 2025
- Source: https://www.uslleagueone.com/statistics

=== Top goalscorers ===
Rank	Name	USL1 Season	U.S. Open Cup	USL Cup	USL League One Playoffs	Total
1	(United States) Ajmeer Spengler	9	0	0	0	9
2	(United States) Brandon McManus	6	1	1	0	8
3	(England) Luke McCormick	5	0	0	0	5
4	(Ghana) Solomon Asante	4	0	0	0	4
4	(England) Teddy Baker	4	0	0	0	4
6	(United States) Diego Pepi	0	0	3	0	3
7	(United States) Jordan Chavez	2	0	0	0	2
7	(The Gambia) Lamin Jawneh	1	0	1	0	2
9	(United States) Brayan Padilla	1	0	0	0	1
9	(Poland) Maciej Bortniczuk	1	0	0	0	1
9	(United States) Will Perkins	1	0	0	0	1
9	(United States) Reid Valentine	1	0	0	0	1
Total		35	1	5	0	41

- Last updated: October 19, 2025
- Source: https://www.uslleagueone.com/statistics

=== Assist scorers ===
Rank	Name	USL1 Season	U.S. Open Cup	USL Cup	USL League One Playoffs	Total
1	(The Gambia) Lamin Jawneh	4	1	1	0	6
2	(United States) Ajmeer Spengler	4	0	0	0	4
3	(Poland) Maciej Bortniczuk	2	0	0	0	2
3	(England) Luke McCormick	2	0	0	0	2
3	(England) Teddy Baker	2	0	0	0	2
6	(Ghana) Solomon Asante	1	0	0	0	1
6	(United States) Will Perkins	1	0	0	0	1
6	(United States) Brayan Padilla	1	0	0	0	1
6	(United States) Angelo Calfo	1	0	0	0	1
6	(United States) Jon Paul Jordan II	1	0	0	0	1
6	(United States) Ozzie Ramos	1	0	0	0	1
6	(Central African Republic) Donald Benamna	0	0	1	0	1
6	(United States) Brandon McManus	0	0	1	0	1
6	(United States) Leland Gray	0	0	1	0	1
Total		20	1	4	0	25

- Last updated: October 11, 2025
- Source: https://www.uslleagueone.com/statistics

=== Clean sheets ===
Rank	Name	USL1 Season	U.S. Open Cup	USL Cup	USL League One Playoffs	Total

- Last updated: March 18, 2025
- Source: https://www.uslleagueone.com/statistics

=== Disciplinary record ===
No.	Pos.	Player	USL1 Season			U.S. Open Cup			USL Cup			USL League One Playoffs			Total		
No.	Pos.	Player	Booked	(yellow card) (yellow-red card)	Sent off (straight red)	Booked	(yellow card) (yellow-red card)	Sent off (straight red)	Booked	(yellow card) (yellow-red card)	Sent off (straight red)	Booked	(yellow card) (yellow-red card)	Sent off (straight red)	Booked	(yellow card) (yellow-red card)	Sent off (straight red)
1	GK	(Scotland) Mason McCready	1	0	0	0	0	0	0	0	0	0	0	0	1	0	0
2	DF	(United States) Reid Valentine	4	0	0	1	0	0	2	0	0	0	0	0	7	0	0
3	MF	(United States) Ozzie Ramos	11	0	0	0	0	1	0	0	0	0	0	0	11	0	1
4	DF	(United States) Preston Kilwien	3	0	0	1	0	0	1	0	0	0	0	0	5	0	0
5	DF	(United States) Angelo Calfo	5	1	0	1	0	0	0	0	0	0	0	0	6	1	0
6	MF	(United States) Leland Gray	0	0	0	0	0	0	0	0	0	0	0	0	0	0	0
7	FW	(United States) Brandon McManus	4	0	2	0	0	0	0	0	0	0	0	0	4	0	2
8	MF	(England) Luke McCormick	4	1	1	0	0	0	0	0	0	0	0	0	4	1	1
9	FW	(United States) Diego Pepi	4	0	0	0	0	0	0	0	0	0	0	0	4	0	0
10	MF	(United States) Ajmeer Spengler	11	1	0	1	0	0	0	0	0	0	0	0	12	1	0
11	MF	(Canada) Dane Domić	1	0	0	0	0	0	0	0	0	0	0	0	0	1	0
12	DF	(United States) Jordan Chavez	11	0	0	1	0	0	2	1	0	0	0	0	14	1	0
13	GK	(United States) Javier Garcia	6	0	0	0	0	0	0	0	0	0	0	0	6	0	0
15	MF	(South Africa) Phila Dlamini	2	0	0	0	0	0	0	0	0	0	0	0	2	0	0
16	DF	(United States) Davey Mason	2	0	1	0	0	0	0	0	0	0	0	0	2	0	0
17	FW	(Poland) Maciej Bortniczuk	3	0	0	0	0	0	0	0	0	0	0	0	3	0	0
19	FW	(Central African Republic) Donald Benamna	0	0	0	0	0	0	0	0	0	0	0	0	0	0	0
20	FW	(Ghana) Solomon Asante	2	0	0	0	0	0	0	0	0	0	0	0	2	0	0
22	DF	(United States) Will Perkins	11	0	0	0	0	0	1	0	0	0	0	0	12	0	0
23	MF	(England) Teddy Baker	4	0	0	0	0	0	1	0	0	0	0	0	5	0	0
24	MF	(United States) Jon Paul Jordan II	8	0	0	0	0	0	0	0	0	0	0	0	8	0	0
25	MF	(United States) Damian Iamarino	0	0	0	0	0	0	0	0	0	0	0	0	0	0	0
26	GK	(United States) Aren Seeger	0	0	0	0	0	0	0	0	0	0	0	0	0	0	0
27	DF	(England) Patrick Staszewski	1	0	0	0	0	0	1	0	0	0	0	0	2	0	0
30	FW	(The Gambia) Lamin Jawneh	3	0	0	1	0	0	1	0	0	0	0	0	5	0	0
35	FW	(United States) Brayan Padilla	2	0	0	0	0	0	0	0	0	0	0	0	2	0	0
	DF	(Cuba) Jorge Corrales	0	0	0	0	0	0	0	0	0	0	0	0	0	0	0
	Coach	(United States) Ben Clarvis	1	0	0	0	0	0	0	0	0	0	0	0	1	0	0
	Coach	(England) Adrian Forbes	10	1	0	0	0	0	2	0	0	0	0	0	11	1	0
Total			114	3	4	6	0	1	12	1	0	0	0	0	132	4	5

- Last updated: October 25, 2025
- Source: https://www.uslleagueone.com/statistics

== Awards and honors ==
=== USL League One Annual Awards ===
==== USL League One All-League Team honorees ====
Team	Player	Position	Ref
Second	(United States) Ajmeer Spengler	MF	

=== USL League One Player of the Month ===
Month	Player	Ref
May	(United States) Javier Garcia	

=== USL League One Player of the Week ===
Week	Player	Opponent	Position	Ref
16	(United States) Ajmeer Spengler	Charlotte Independence	MF	

=== USL League One Team of the Week ===
Week	Player	Opponent	Position	Ref
3	(United States) Jordan Chavez	Westchester SC	Bench	
4	(United States) Brandon McManus	One Knoxville SC	Bench	
7	(United States) Mason McCready	Forward Madison FC	Bench	
9	(United States) Ajmeer Spengler	Charlotte Independence	MF	
10	(United States) Javier Garcia	AV Alta FC	GK	
11	(United States) Ajmeer Spengler	Union Omaha	MF	
11	(United States) Javier Garcia	Union Omaha	Bench	
11	(Ghana) Solomon Asante	Union Omaha	Bench	
12	(United States) Javier Garcia	Greenville Triumph SC	Bench	
14	(England) Teddy Baker	Richmond Kickers	Midfielder	
14	(Ghana) Solomon Asante	Richmond Kickers	Forward	
14	(England) Adrian Forbes	Richmond Kickers	Coach	
14	(United States) Ajmeer Spengler	Richmond Kickers	Bench	
16	(United States) Ajmeer Spengler	Charlotte Independence	MF	
16	(Ghana) Solomon Asante	Charlotte Independence	Bench	
17/18	(United States) Angelo Calfo	Spokane Velocity and Forward Madison FC	DF	
17/18	(United States) Javier Garcia	Spokane Velocity and Forward Madison FC	Bench	
17/18	(Poland) Maciej Bortniczuk	Spokane Velocity and Forward Madison FC	Bench	
19	(United States) Javier Garcia	Portland Hearts of Pine	Bench	
20	(United States) Jordan Chavez	Chattanooga Red Wolves SC	Bench	
21/22	(England) Teddy Baker	Charlotte Independence	MF	
23	(England) Luke McCormick	FC Naples	Bench	
25	(United States) Ajmeer Spengler	AV Alta FC and Greenville Triumph SC	MF	
25	(United States) Javier Garcia	AV Alta FC and Greenville Triumph SC	Bench	
28	(United States) Ajmeer Spengler	Spokane Velocity	MF	
28	(United States) Brandon McManus	Spokane Velocity	FW	
28	(United States) Javier Garcia	Spokane Velocity	Bench	
31	(United States) Ajmeer Spengler	AV Alta FC	Bench	
32	(England) Teddy Baker	Richmond Kickers	MF	
32	(United States) Javier Garcia	Richmond Kickers	Bench	
32	(United States) Jon Jordan	Richmond Kickers	Bench	
33	(England) Teddy Baker	One Knoxville SC	Bench	

=== USL Jägermeister Cup Team of the Round ===
Round	Player	Opponent	Position	Ref
3	(United States) Diego Pepi	Phoenix Rising FC	FW	
3	(United States) Brandon McManus	Phoenix Rising FC	Bench	

=== USL League One Goal of the Week ===
Matchday	Player	Opponent	Ref
25	(England) Luke McCormick	AV Alta FC	

=== USL League One Save of the Week ===
Matchday	Player	Opponent	Ref
11	(United States) Javier Garcia	Union Omaha	
12	(United States) Javier Garcia	Greenville Triumph SC	
17/18	(United States) Javier Garcia	Forward Madison FC	
21/22	(United States) Javier Garcia	Charlotte Independence	
24	(United States) Javier Garcia	Chattanooga Red Wolves SC	
25	(United States) Javier Garcia	AV Alta FC	
27	(United States) Javier Garcia	Union Omaha	
28	(United States) Javier Garcia	Spokane Velocity	
34	(United States) Javier Garcia	South Georgia Tormenta FC	
