= I-94 Cup =

The I-94 Cup is a season-long competition between three Twin Cities area football clubs in the National Premier Soccer League. The competition was created in 2014 when the Minnesota United FC Reserves entered the league. Long-time NPSL members Minnesota Twin Stars FC and Eau Claire Aris FC are located on opposite ends of the three clubs, all near Interstate 94.

The series of matches are played throughout the season with the club with the best head-to-head record winning the competition.

== Results ==
Year	Winner
2014	Minnesota Twin Stars FC

== History ==
=== 2014 ===
Standings	W	D	L	GF	GA
Minnesota Twin Stars FC	3	1	0	14	3
Minnesota United FC Reserves	2	1	1	11	6
Eau Claire Aris FC	0	0	4	3	19

Sunday, May 18

Eau Claire Aris (2) vs Minnesota United Reserves (7)

Sunday, June 8

Minnesota TwinStars (3) vs Minnesota United Reserves (1)

Sunday, June 15

Minnesota United Reserves (1) vs Minnesota TwinStars (1)

Saturday, June 21

Minnesota United Reserves (2) vs Eau Claire Aris (0)

Sunday, June 22

Eau Claire Aris (0) vs Minnesota TwinStars (7)

Sunday, July 6

Minnesota TwinStars (3) vs Eau Claire Aris (1)
