= 2026 Miami FC season =

Miami FC
2026 season
- Owner: Riccardo Silva
- Head coach: Gastόn Maddoni
- Stadium: Pitbull Stadium; Miami, Florida
- USL Championship: Eastern Conf.: TBD; Overall: TBD
- U.S. Open Cup: Did not Enter
- USL Cup: Quarter-Finals
Home colours	Away colours

The 2026 Miami FC season is the club's seventh season in the USL Championship, the second-tier of the American soccer system, and eleventh overall.

For the first time in club history, Miami FC did not enter into the 2026 US Open Cup, as due to the compacted format of this season's cup tournament, only clubs in the USL Championship who made it to the 2025 USL Championship playoffs entered into the tournament.

== Players and staff ==
As of March 10, 2026

Note: Flags indicate national team as defined under FIFA eligibility rules; some limited exceptions apply. Players may hold more than one non-FIFA nationality.

No.	Pos.	Nation	Player
1	GK	CUW	Eloy Room
2	DF	USA	Preston Kilwien
3	DF	USA	Angelo Calfo
4	MF	JPN	Riyon Tori
6	DF	TOG	Tulu
7	MF	ENG	Mason Tunbridge
8	MF	ARG	Matías Romero
9	MF	USA	Joel Soñora
10	FW	CUW	Jürgen Locadia
11	MF	USA	Daltyn Knutson
12	MF	SEN	Bachir Ndiaye
14	DF	ENG	Arthur Rogers

No.	Pos.	Nation	Player
16	MF	PUR	Gerald Díaz
20	MF	PER	Alessandro Milesi
22	MF	BRA	Rodrigo da Costa
23	MF	USA	Tommy Musto
26	FW	COL	Arney Rocha
27	FW	CMR	Mathieu Ndongo
28	GK	URU	Felipe Rodriguez
34	FW	USA	Alexander Naranjo
35	FW	JAM	Brandon Brant
37	MF	USA	Diego Mello
40	GK	ESP	Marco Simion
41	GK	USA	Julian Rodriguez

1. USL Academy Contract

=== Staff ===
As of March 9, 2025

Position	Staff	Nation
Head coach	Gastόn Maddoni	Argentina
Assistant coach	Victor Lonchuk	Argentina
Goalkeeper coach	Cristian Blanco	Argentina
Strength & performance coach	Lucas Vaeza	United States

== Competitive ==
=== USL Championship ===
==== Standings — Eastern Conference ====
Pos	Team	Pld	W	L	T	GF	GA	GD	Pts	Qualification
1	Tampa Bay Rowdies (S, Q)	29	17	5	7	50	26	+24	58	Playoffs
2	Detroit City FC (Q)	29	14	7	8	34	21	+13	50	Playoffs
3	Charleston Battery (Q)	29	15	9	5	55	35	+20	50	Playoffs
4	Louisville City FC (Q)	29	13	9	7	51	43	+8	46	Playoffs
5	Pittsburgh Riverhounds SC (Q)	29	12	11	6	31	29	+2	42	Playoffs
6	Rhode Island FC (Q)	29	12	11	6	41	31	+10	42	Playoffs
7	Hartford Athletic (Q)	29	9	7	13	33	32	+1	40	Playoffs
8	Miami FC	30	9	12	9	39	49	−10	36	Playoffs
9	Indy Eleven	29	9	13	7	35	40	−5	34	
10	Birmingham Legion FC (E)	29	6	11	12	39	44	−5	30	
11	Loudoun United FC (E)	29	5	11	13	34	45	−11	28	
12	Brooklyn FC (E)	29	5	18	6	31	59	−28	21	
13	Sporting Club Jacksonville (E)	29	3	21	5	32	76	−44	14	

Updated to match(es) played on October 22, 2026. Source: USL Championship Standings
(E) Eliminated; (Q) Qualified for the phase indicated; (S) Players' Shield winner

==== Results summary ====
Overall								Home						Away					
Pld	W	D	L	GF	GA	GD	Pts	W	D	L	GF	GA	GD	W	D	L	GF	GA	GD
0	0	0	0	0	0	0	0	0	0	0	0	0	0	0	0	0	0	0	0

Last updated: April 1, 2026.
Source: Match reports

==== Matches ====
On December 16, 2025, the USL Championship released the schedule for all 25 teams for both the regular season and the USL Cup.

March 14 1	Louisville City FC	4–1	Miami FC	Louisville, Kentucky
4:00 pm EDT	McFadden 8'; Serrano 28'; Donovan 30'; Wilson 68'	Report	Milesi 44'	Stadium: Lynn Family Stadium; Attendance: 9,009; Referee: Joshua Encarnación

March 21 2	Loudoun United FC	0–0	Miami FC	Leesburg, Virginia
3:00 pm EDT		Report		Stadium: Segra Field; Attendance: 971

March 25 3	Sporting Club Jacksonville	2–4	Miami FC	Jacksonville, Florida
7:30 pm EDT	Sadlier 2', 23' (pen.)	Report	Tunbridge 12'; Milesi 53'; Rocha 58' (pen.); Ndongo 84'	Stadium: Hodges Stadium; Attendance: 1,311; Referee: Deny Kulasinac

March 28 4	Miami FC	2–1	Rhode Island FC	Miami, Florida
7:00 pm EDT	Rocha 22'; Ndongo 50'	Report	Atkinson 65'; Bacharach (yellow card) 76' (yellow-red card) 80'	Stadium: South Dade Kia Field at Pitbull Stadium; Attendance: 1,289; Referee: Luis Arroyo

April 4 5	Miami FC	0–0	Hartford Athletic	Miami, Florida
7:00 pm EDT		Report		Stadium: Pitbull Stadium; Attendance: 1,006; Referee: Abdou Ndiaye

April 11 6	San Antonio FC	0–0	Miami FC	San Antonio, Texas
9:30 pm EDT		Report	Tunbridge (red card) 72'	Stadium: Toyota Field; Attendance: 5,758; Referee: Ekaterina Koroleva

April 18 7	Miami FC	0–3	Phoenix Rising FC	Miami, Florida
7:00 pm EDT		Report	Sacko 8' (pen.), 90+3'; Dennis 59'	Stadium: Pitbull Stadium; Attendance: 1,277; Referee: Edson Carvajal

May 2 8	Miami FC	3–2	Brooklyn FC	Miami, Florida
7:00 pm EDT	Burns 35' (o.g.); Vancaeyezeele 51' (o.g.); Locadia 71'	Report	Anderson 37'; Stojanovic 75'	Stadium: Pitbull Stadium; Attendance: 1,439; Referee: Jorge Escobar

May 7 9	Birmingham Legion FC	0–0	Miami FC	Birmingham, Alabama
8:00 pm EDT		Report		Stadium: Protective Stadium; Attendance: 5,084; Referee: Benjamin Meyer

May 20 10	Detroit City FC	2–1	Miami FC	Hamtramck, Michigan
7:30 pm EDT	Diop (red card) 28'; Rodriguez (yellow card) 44'; Diouf 46'; Saldaña (yellow card) 57'; Smith 84'	Report	Locadia (yellow card) 23'; Ndiaye (yellow card) 40'; Calfo (yellow card) 64'; Musto 76' (yellow card) 78'; Diallo (yellow card) 90+2'; Díaz (yellow card) 90+5'	Stadium: Keyworth Stadium; Attendance: 5,053; Referee: Alyssa Pennington

May 23 11	Miami FC	4–3	Louisville City FC	Miami, Florida
7:00 pm EDT	Calfo (yellow card) 13'; Locadia 20', 29', 83'; Musto (yellow card) 60'; Adams 72' (o.g.); Room (yellow card) 86'; Milesi (yellow card) 90'	Report	Donovan 41', 89'; McFadden (yellow card) 57'; Showunmi 82'	Stadium: South Dade Kia Field at Pitbull Stadium; Referee: Mark Verso

May 30 12	Pittsburgh Riverhounds SC	2–0	Miami FC	Pittsburgh, Pennsylvania
7:00 pm EDT	Dikwa Lega 49'; Ahl 73'	Report		Stadium: Highmark Stadium; Attendance: 6,053; Referee: Carlos Rodriguez

June 13, 2026 13	Oakland Roots SC	0–0	Miami FC	Oakland, California
10:00 pm EDT		Report		Stadium: Oakland Coliseum; Attendance: 3,780; Referee: Robert Vincze

June 24 14	Miami FC	2–4	Orange County SC	Miami, Florida
7:00 pm EDT	Milesi 14'; Ndongo 82'	Report	Bazini 44', 60'; Kelly 55'; Solis 90+4'	Stadium: South Dade Kia Field at Pitbull Stadium; Attendance: 665; Referee: Alex Billeter

July 5 15	Miami FC	1–1	Birmingham Legion FC	Miami, Florida
7:00 pm EDT	Rocha 41'	Report	Vassell 78'	Stadium: South Dade Kia Field at Pitbull Stadium; Attendance: 606; Referee: Elvis Osmanovic

July 15 16	Miami FC	2–0	Indy Eleven	Miami, Florida
7:00 pm EDT	da Costa 44'; Locadia 76'	Report		Stadium: South Dade Kia Field at Pitbull Stadium; Attendance: 611; Referee: Calin Radosav

July 22 17	Colorado Springs Switchbacks FC	2–0	Miami FC	Colorado Springs, Colorado
9:00 pm EDT	Bennett 79', 90'	Report		Stadium: Weidner Field; Attendance: 5,783; Referee: Trevor Wiseman

July 25 18	Miami FC	2–3	Tampa Bay Rowdies	Miami, Florida
7:00 pm EDT	Rocha 45+2' (pen.); Locadia 76'	Report	Cicerone 10'; Myers 12'; LeFlore (yellow card) 24' (yellow-red card) 45+5'; Micaletto 80'	Stadium: South Dade Kia Field at Pitbull Stadium; Attendance: 1,249; Referee: Matthew Thompson

August 1 19	Miami FC	2–2	Detroit City FC	Miami, Florida
7:00 pm EDT	Locadia 55'; Díaz 64'	Report	Rodriguez 34'; Silva 89'	Stadium: South Dade Kia Field at Pitbull Stadium; Attendance: 656; Referee: Rodrigo Albuquerque

August 8 20	Miami FC	0–1	Las Vegas Lights FC	Miami, Florida
7:00 pm EDT		Report	Arteaga 34'	Stadium: South Dade Kia Field at Pitbull Stadium; Attendance: 656; Referee: Amin Hadzic

August 15 21	Hartford Athletic	2–1	Miami FC	Hartford, Connecticut
7:30 pm EDT	Coffey 16'; Room 90+4' (o.g.)	Report	Locadia 45+2'	Stadium: Trinity Health Stadium; Attendance: 4,105; Referee: Cristian Campo

August 22 22	Charleston Battery	5–0	Miami FC	Mt. Pleasant, South Carolina
7:30 pm EDT	Foster 19'; Berry 45+3', 47'; Smith 62'; Hughes 86'	Report	Milanés (red card) 35'	Stadium: Patriots Point Soccer Complex; Attendance: 4,638; Referee: Brad Jensen; Assistant referees: Kevin Broadley

September 5 23	Miami FC	2–2	Pittsburgh Riverhounds SC	Miami, Florida
7:00 pm EDT	Rocha 45+4'; Knutson 90+10'	Report	Amann 45+8' (pen.); Bassett 60'	Stadium: South Dade Kia Field at Pitbull Stadium; Referee: Matthew Corrigan

September 12 24	Brooklyn FC	1–1	Miami FC	Brooklyn, New York
7:00 pm EDT	Ndiaye 81' (o.g.)	Report	Rocha 70'	Stadium: Maimonides Park; Attendance: 2,474; Referee: Deny Kulasinac

September 19 25	Rhode Island FC	1–2	Miami FC	Pawtucket, Rhode Island
7:30 pm EDT	Yao 36'	Report	Rocha 25'; Milanés 74'	Stadium: Centreville Bank Stadium; Attendance: 10,308; Referee: Gerald Flores

September 26 26	Indy Eleven	0–2	Miami FC	Indianapolis, Indiana
7:00 pm EDT		Report	da Costa 17'; Tunbridge 44'	Stadium: Carroll Stadium; Attendance: 7,878; Referee: Carlos Rodriguez

September 30 27	Miami FC	4–1	Sporting Club Jacksonville	Miami, Florida
7:00 pm EDT	Rocha 38'; Milanés 42', 85'; Tunbridge 80'	Report	Edwards (red card) 29'; Mota 43'	Stadium: South Dade Kia Field at Pitbull Stadium; Referee: Amin Hadzic

October 3 28	Tampa Bay Rowdies	1–2	Miami FC	St. Petersburg, Florida
7:30 pm EDT	Ostrem 54'	Report	Rocha 5'; da Costa 60'	Stadium: Al Lang Stadium; Attendance: 7,012; Referee: Servando Berna Rico

October 10 29	Miami FC	0–2	Loudoun United FC	Miami, Florida
7:00 pm EDT		Report	Davis 85', 90+7'	Stadium: South Dade Kia Field at Pitbull Stadium; Referee: Jorge Escobar

October 17 30	Miami FC	1–2	Charleston Battery	Miami, Florida
7:00 pm EDT	Al-Zubaidi 25'	Report	Swan 74'; Berry 77'	Stadium: South Dade Kia Field at Pitbull Stadium; Referee: Elton García

=== USL Cup ===
Miami FC participated in the third edition of the USL Cup, and the second edition to feature teams from both the USL Championship and League One.

Miami was drawn into Group 7.

==== Standings — Group 7 ====
Pos	Lg	Team	Pld	W	PKW	PKL	L	GF	GA	GD	Pts	Qualification
1	USLC	Tampa Bay Rowdies	4	4	0	0	0	10	1	+9	12	Advance to knockout stage
2	USLC	Miami FC	4	3	0	0	1	11	5	+6	9	Advance to knockout stage (wild card)
3	USLC	Sporting Club Jacksonville	4	1	0	1	2	3	4	−1	4	
4	USL1	Sarasota Paradise	4	1	0	0	3	2	9	−7	3	
5	USL1	FC Naples	4	0	1	0	3	2	9	−7	2	

==== Matches ====
===== Group stage =====
April 25	Sporting JAX	0–1	Miami FC	Jacksonville, Florida
7:30 p.m.		Report	Rocha 9'	Stadium: Hodges Stadium; Attendance: 1,642; Referee: Brad Jensen

April 29	Miami FC	4–1	FC Naples	Miami, Florida
7:00 p.m.	Rocha 8'; Tunbridge 12'; Ndiaye 17'; Knutson (yellow card) 25'; Locadia 55'	Report	Bachstein 30'	Stadium: Pitbull Stadium; Attendance: 821; Referee: Elvis Osmanovic

May 16	Miami FC	1–4	Tampa Bay Rowdies	Miami, Florida
7:00 p.m.	Tunbridge 80'	Report	Perez 12'; Myers 42', 47'; Schneider 68'	Stadium: South Dade Kia Field at Pitbull Stadium; Attendance: 762; Referee: John Matto

July 11	Sarasota Paradise	0–5	Miami FC	Lakewood Ranch, Florida
7:30 p.m.		Report	Tunbridge 16' (pen.); Díaz 28'; Rocha 37'; Locadia 59'; Knutson 62'	Stadium: Premier Sports Campus; Attendance: 1,436; Referee: Atahan Ayaya

==== Knockouts ====
August 12 Quarter-finals	San Antonio FC	2–1	Miami FC	San Antonio, Texas
8:30 p.m.	Parano 44', 64'	Report	Rocha 79'	Stadium: Toyota Field; Attendance: 6,092; Referee: Nabil Bensalah
