= Nyom =

Nyom is a surname. Notable people with the surname include:

- Allan Nyom (born 1988), a Cameroonian footballer
- Jules Alex Nyom (born 1984), a Cameroonian footballer
