= Francis Mbome =

Cameroonian footballer (born 1988)

Personal information
- Full name: Francis Duclair Mbome Mbome
- Date of birth: 30 November 1988 (age 37)
- Place of birth: Yaoundé, Cameroon
- Height: 1.86 m (6 ft 1 in)
- Position: Defensive midfielder

Youth career
- 2002–2003: Sint-Truidense

Senior career*
Years	Team	Apps	(Gls)
2004	Pandores de Yaoundé		
2005	Les Astres		
2006	Espérance		
2007–2008	Akonangui		
2009–2010	Minnesota Twin Stars		

International career
2008–2010	Equatorial Guinea	9	(0)
- * Club domestic league appearances and goals

Francis Duclair Mbome Mbome (born 30 November 1988) is a former footballer who played as a midfielder. Born in Cameroon, he has represented Equatorial Guinea internationally.

== Career ==
Mbome's career spanned several countries, including Cameroon, Equatorial Guinea, and now he currently plays for Minnesota Twin Stars, making his NPSL debut in 2009, aged 21. He, along with several key players led the team to their second successive Midwest NPSL title.

=== International career ===
Mbome played in all six qualifiers against teams such as Nigeria, South Africa, and made his Equatorial Guinea national team debut on 1 June 2008 in a World Cup 2010 Qualifying match against Sierra Leone in Malabo. That day the Nzalang Nacional (the nickname of Equatorial Guinea national football team) won 2–0. Mbome received another call up on 29 March 2011 for a match vs Gambia, in a 1–0 victory.

== Personal honours ==
Pandores:

- 2004: 2nd Place in 2nd Division Center Province

Les Astres:

- 2005: 3rd place in the 1st Division, and qualify to the CAF Cup

Akonangui:

- 2007: Equatoguinean Cup winner, 3rd place in the Equatoguinean Premier League and a place at the CAF Cup

Minnesota Twinstars:

- 2009: NPSL Midwest Regional Champion
