= Javier Garcia Jr. =

American soccer player (born 1998)

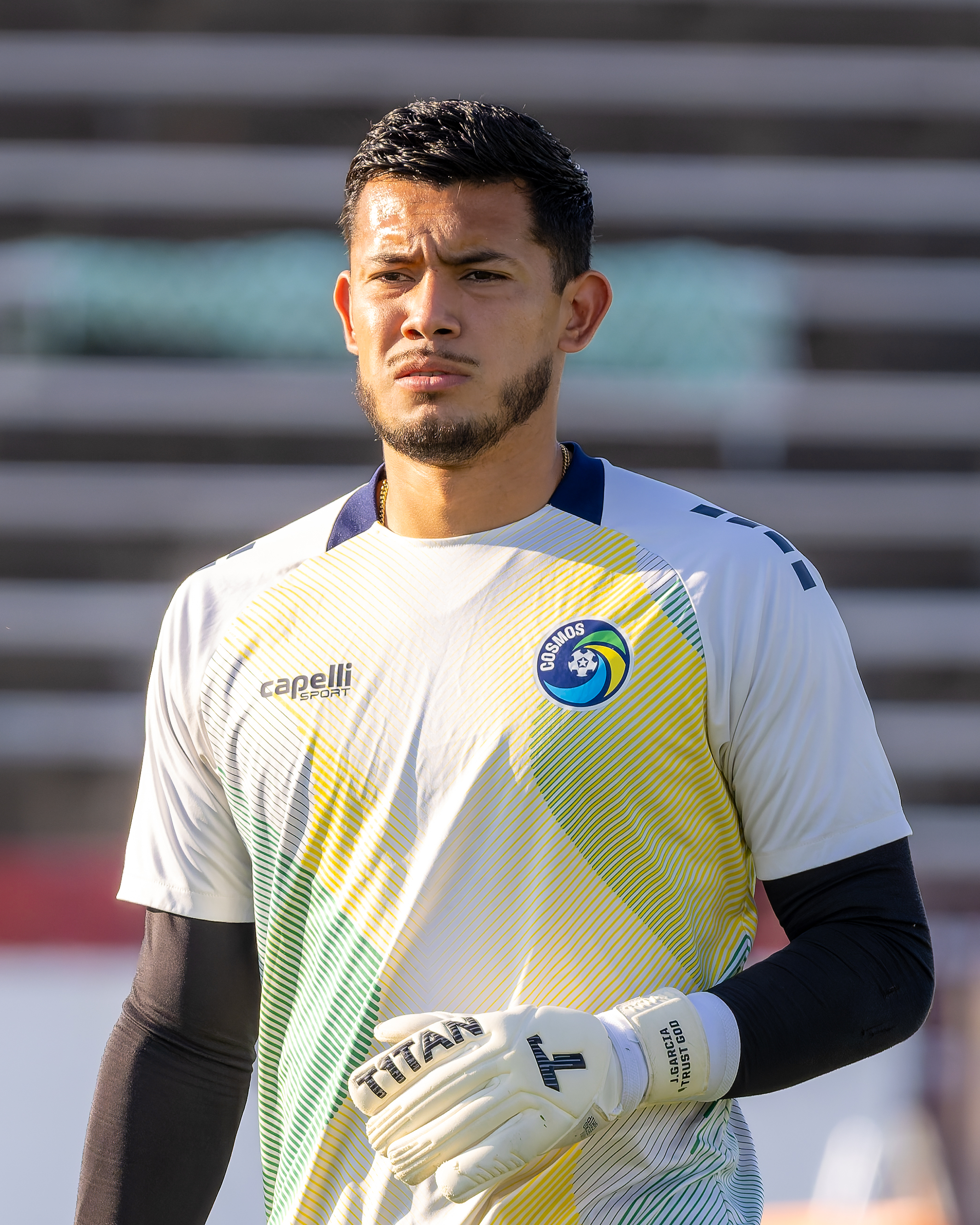
- Garcia with the NY Cosmos in 2026

Personal information
- Full name: Javier Garcia Jr.
- Date of birth: March 23, 1998 (age 28)
- Place of birth: McAllen, Texas, United States
- Height: 1.88 m (6 ft 2 in)
- Position: Goalkeeper

Team information
- Current team: New York Cosmos
- Number: 26

Youth career
- 2017-2020: RGVFC Academy

College career
Years	Team	Apps	(Gls)
2020–2021	UT Rio Grande Valley Vaqueros	0	(0)

Senior career*
Years	Team	Apps	(Gls)
2021-2022	Rio Grande Valley FC Toros	6	(0)
2023-2024	El Paso Locomotive FC	1	(0)
2025	Texoma FC	24	(0)
2026	Athletic Club Boise	0	(0)
2026–	New York Cosmos	15	(0)
- * Club domestic league appearances and goals as of October 30, 2026

Javier Garcia Jr. (born March 23, 1998) is an American soccer player who currently plays as a goalkeeper for New York Cosmos in the USL League One.

== Career ==
=== College and amateur ===
Garcia Jr. played high school soccer at Juarez-Lincoln High School. He also played club soccer for the Rio Grande Valley FC Toros Academy from 2017 through 2020. In 2020 he played collegiately with UT Rio Grande Valley Vaqueros.

=== Rio Grande Valley FC Toros ===
During August 2021, Garcia Jr. signed with USL Championship club Rio Grande Valley FC Toros, after having played for several years in the clubs academy. He made his professional debut on June 12, 2022, appearing as a starter in a 2–2 draw with Oakland Roots. A week later, on June 18, 2022, Garcia recorded his first clean sheet, leading RGVFC to a 1-0 victory over Pittsburgh Riverhounds SC.

=== El Paso Locomotive FC ===
On January 6, 2023, Garcia Jr. signed with USL Championship club El Paso Locomotive FC. He made his debut for the club on April 5, 2023, appearing as a starter in a 2-0 loss to Union Omaha in the Lamar Hunt U.S. Open Cup. He would re-sign with the club on November 15, 2023 and serve as the club backup goalkeeper. He would leave El Paso after the 2024 season, having appeared in 3 matches.

=== Texoma FC ===
On February 6, 2025, Garcia Jr. signed with USL League One club Texoma FC. Garcia Jr established himself a s a starter for the Texas side, being named USL League One Player of the Month for May 2025. During his three matches during the month which included a draw against AV Alta FC and victories against Union Omaha and Greenville Triumph SC he posted two clean sheets and 12 saves. He appeared in 24 league matches during the campaign and became the leagues all-time leader in penalty saves, having saved 6 pks.

=== AC Boise ===
On January 13, 2026, Garcia Jr. signed with USL League One side Athletic Club Boise. Garcia Jr. began the season as the clubs back-up goalkeeper. Being known for his prowess at stopping penalty kicks, he made his debut for the club on April 28, 2026, coming on as a last minute substitute in a USL Cup match against Las Vegas Lights FC. With the match tied at 1-1 it went into a penalty shootout, where Garcia made two decisive saves to give AC Boise the victory.

=== New York Cosmos ===
On May 6, 2026, with the New York Cosmos in need of stability at the goalkeeper position, Garcia Jr. was acquired from Athletic Club Boise. On May 15, 2026, Garcia made his debut for Cosmos, appearing as a starter in 3-2 comeback victory over Westchester SC in a USL Cup match. On July 8, 2026 recorded his first clean sheet of the season in 1-0 victory over FC Naples.

== Career statistics ==
As of match played October 30, 2026

Appearances and goals by club, season and competition
Club	Season	League			National cup		League cup		Other		Total	
Club	Season	Division	Apps	Goals	Apps	Goals	Apps	Goals	Apps	Goals	Apps	Goals
Rio Grande Valley FC Toros	2021	USL Championship	0	0	0	0	0	0	0	0	0	0
Rio Grande Valley FC Toros	2022	USL Championship	6	0	0	0	0	0	0	0	6	0
El Paso Locomotive FC	2023	USL Championship	0	0	1	0	0	0	1	0	2	0
El Paso Locomotive FC	2024	USL Championship	1	0	0	0	0	0	0	0	1	0
Texoma FC	2025	USL League One	24	0	0	0	1	0	0	0	25	0
Athletic Club Boise	2026	USL League One	0	0	0	0	1	0	0	0	1	0
New York Cosmos	2026	USL League One	15	0	0	0	1	0	0	0	16	0
Career total			46	0	1	0	3	0	1	0	51	0
