= Minnesota Twin Stars =

- Full name: Minnesota TwinStars FC
- Nickname: TwinStars FC
- Founded: 1997; 29 years ago
- Stadium: Minnetonka High School
- Capacity: ~1,000
- President: Peter Maracotta
- Manager: Youssef Darbaki
- League: NPSL
- 2017: 4th, Midwest-North; Final Four: DNQ
Home colors	Away colors

Minnesota TwinStars FC is an American soccer team playing in the Minnetonka High School Stadium, Minnetonka, Minnesota, United States. Founded in 1997, the team plays in National Premier Soccer League. Prior to the 2004 season, the team was known as the St. Paul TwinStars FC.

The Minnesota TwinStars FC historically had a long-standing relationship with the Hmong community in Minnesota, along with the African community in suburbs such as Brooklyn Park, Minnesota. In the early stages of the team's history, the dominant ethnic group that played on the TwinStars were Hmong, from Wisconsin and Minnesota.

Midwest (now Midwest-North) division champions two times (2008 and 2009), and National Championship runner-up once (2008), in two NPSL Final Four appearances.

History between the TwinStars FC and professional clubs around the world has been strong. Several players have gone on to play professionally in North America and Europe, such as Ismaila Jome, Alex Nyom, Geoffrey Myers, and Liberian international, Ansu Toure. Equatorial Guinean international, Francis Mbome arrived to the Minnesota outfit in 2010 and played with them for two years.

The men's team is the senior representative of the Minnesota TwinStars Academy (TSA), which was founded in 2012. The TSA U-16 club was ranked first in Minnesota in 2014, fourth in the region, and 100 nationally in just its second year of existence.

== History ==
=== Early success ===
TwinStars was created by Yeng Xiong in late 1997 with elite Hmong players.

==== 2006–2010 ====
The TwinStars have competed for the Midwest title throughout its existence. Their first taste of success was the 2006 season, where one of their players, Igor Stosic, was named to the NPSL Midwest All-Star team.

They followed up in the 2007 season, by having two of their players names on the All-Star team; Juan Fiz, and 3-time winner (two with the TwinStars) Igor Stosic.

Winning their first Midwest title in 2008, having five of their players named into the Midwest All-Star team, and one of the five, Geoffrey Myers, was named as the 2008 MVP, after scoring 14 goals and five assists in only 12 appearances. Following their triumph in regional competition, the club played in the NPSL Final Four in New York, where they were runners-up in the National tournament.

TwinStars FC won the Midwest title again in 2009, this time having four players named to the Midwest All-Star team. Once again having the league MVP, this time being the 5-time All-Star, Igor Stosic, becoming the most decorated TwinStars FC player in history.

The 2010 season saw the arrival of Equatorial Guinean international Francis Mbome. The TwinStars placed third of six teams in the Midwest division, having an overall record of 5–3–2. For the third season in a row, they had produced the league MVP, this time being former Liberian national team player Richard Kamara.

=== Developing years ===
==== 2011–2013 ====
The 2013 season saw many players from the youth sides advance into the senior team. Seven of the players who regularly started games for the TwinStars were in high school; all coming from Prairie Seeds Academy.

== Crest and colors ==
The club crest has been changed several times, usually featuring a dragon, with two stars above a red and black shield. The current crest, featuring a red dragon in front of the black half of the shield, and a black dragon on the red half of the shield, both clutching a soccer ball with two golden stars (hence the name "TwinStars") above them, is a modified version of one of the first crests, used in 2005.

== Stadiums ==
- James Griffin Stadium; St. Paul, Minnesota (2005–2006)
- Macalester Stadium at Macalester College; St. Paul, Minnesota (2007–2009)
- Edor Nelson Field at Augsburg University; Minneapolis, Minnesota (2010)
- Prairie Seeds Academy; Brooklyn Park, Minnesota (2011–2013)
- Mound-Westonka High School; Mound, Minnesota (2014–2015)
- Hopkins High School; Minnetonka, Minnesota (2016)
- Minnetonka High School; Minnetonka, Minnesota (2017–present)

== Statistics and records ==
=== All-Star Team Players ===
==== Africa ====
- (Cameroon) Jules Alex Nyom (2009)
- (Liberia) Ansu Toure (2006)
- (Liberia) Geoffrey Myers (2008)
- (Liberia) Richard Kamara (2008, 2009, 2010)
- (Mali) Adama Diawara (2008, 2009, 2010)

==== Europe ====
- (Serbia) Igor Stosic (2005 [with Minnesota Blast], 2006, 2007, 2008, 2009)

==== South America ====
- (Argentina) Juan Fiz (2007, 2008)

=== Club MVPs ===
- 2008 (Liberia) Geoffrey Myers
- 2009 (Serbia) Igor Stosic
- 2010 (Liberia) Richard Kamara

=== Captains ===
- (Argentina) Juan Fiz (2006–2007)
- (Liberia) Richard Kamara (2008–2011)
- (Mali) Adama Diawara (2012)
- (Liberia) Martin Browne (2013–2014)
- (Morocco) Karim Darbaki (2014–present)

== Current technical staff ==
as of 28 April 2015

Position	Name
Head Coach	Youssef Darbaki
Assistant Coach	Bulut Turk Ozturk
Goalkeeper Coach	Brian Teske
Technical & Academy Director	Youssef Darbaki
Trainer	Dr. Nicole Hamel
Trainer	Marcia Abbott

== Seasonal statistics ==
Year	Division	League	Reg. season	National Final Four	Open Cup
2005	4	NPSL	4th, Midwest	Did not qualify	Did not enter
2006	4	NPSL	3rd, Midwest	Did not qualify	Did not enter
2007	4	NPSL	3rd, Midwest	Did not qualify	Did not enter
2008	4	NPSL	1st, Midwest	Runner-up	Did not enter
2009	4	NPSL	1st, Midwest	Semi-finalists	Did not enter
2010	4	NPSL	3rd, Midwest	Did not qualify	Did not enter
2011	4	NPSL	4th, Midwest	Did not qualify	Did not enter
2012	4	NPSL	4th, Midwest-Central	Did not qualify	Did not enter
2013	4	NPSL	4th, Midwest-Central	Did not qualify	Did not enter
2014	4	NPSL	5th, Midwest-Central	Did not qualify	Did not enter
2015	4	NPSL	13th, Midwest	Did not qualify	Did not enter
2016	5	APL	3rd	Did not qualify	Did not enter
2017	4	NPSL	6th, Midwest-North	Did not qualify	Did not enter

== Managers ==
- (Morocco) Youssef Darbaki (2005–present)

== Honors ==
=== Domestic ===
- National Premier Soccer League
  - Midwest Conference: 2008, 2009
  - National Final Four: Runner-up (2008)
