= Ismaila Jome =

Gambian footballer

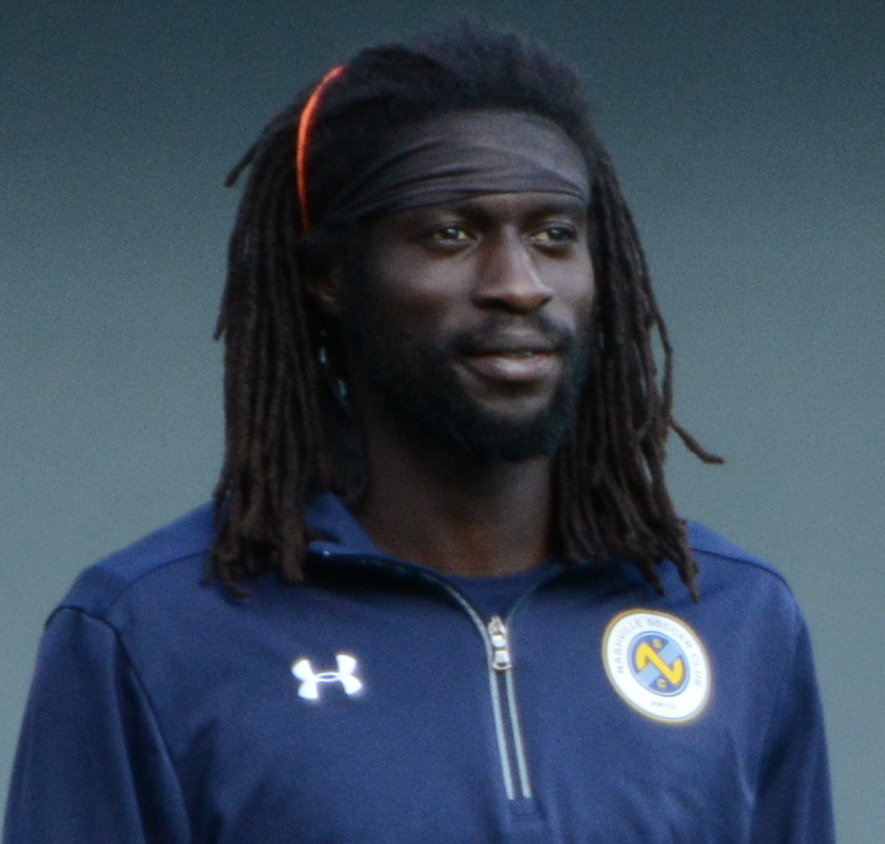
- Jome with Nashville SC in 2018

Personal information
- Date of birth: November 4, 1994 (age 32)
- Place of birth: Banjul, Gambia
- Height: 6 ft 1 in (1.85 m)
- Positions: Defender; midfielder

Youth career
- Prairie Seeds Academy

College career
Years	Team	Apps	(Gls)
2013–2015	UC Santa Barbara Gauchos	56	(6)

Senior career*
Years	Team	Apps	(Gls)
2014–2015	Ventura County Fusion	12	(2)
2015	Portland Timbers U23s	4	(0)
2016	Minnesota United	9	(1)
2017	Minnesota United	12	(0)
2018	Nashville SC	18	(0)
2019	Colorado Springs Switchbacks	34	(4)
2020	Austin Bold	16	(2)
2021	Portland Timbers	1	(0)
2022	Portland Timbers 2	17	(2)
2023	San Antonio FC	18	(0)
2024–2025	Spokane Velocity	38	(3)
Total		179	(15)

International career
2023	Gambia	1	(0)
- * Club domestic league appearances and goals

Ismaila "Ish" Jome (born November 4, 1994) is a Gambian former footballer who plays as a defender.

== Early life and education ==
Jome was born on November 4, 1994, in Banjul, Gambia, to Jainaba Jobe and Dodou Jome. At a young age, he relocated and was raised in Brooklyn Center, Minnesota. He attended high school at Prairie Seeds Academy, where he was named the 2012 Minnesota State High School Soccer Coaches Association's "Mr. Soccer" in his senior year.

Jome attended the University of California, Santa Barbara, and was a student-athlete for the UC Santa Barbara Gauchos men's soccer team. He made an immediate impact in his first year where he played and started in 21 games, scored 2 goals, and added 7 assists. He was named as the 2013 Big West Conference Freshman of the Year and to the conference's first team in addition to Soccer America's All-Freshman team. His sophomore campaign saw him appear in 18 more games, 17 of which he started, while adding a goal and 5 assists. He was once again named First Team All-Big West Conference in 2014. In 2015, Jome appeared in 16 games, starting 9, and scored 3 goals with 3 assists. He left UCSB after his junior year to pursue a professional soccer career. While in college, Jome played for Ventura County Fusion of the Premier Development League in 2014 and 2015. He also appeared for Portland Timbers U23s in 2015.

== Career ==
=== Minnesota United ===
Jome signed a professional contract with Minnesota United FC announced in March 2016. He made his professional debut on July 23, 2016, as a 63rd-minute substitute against Fort Lauderdale Strikers and scored his first professional goal just seven minutes later in the 70th minute in a 3–1 victory for Minnesota.

=== Nashville SC ===
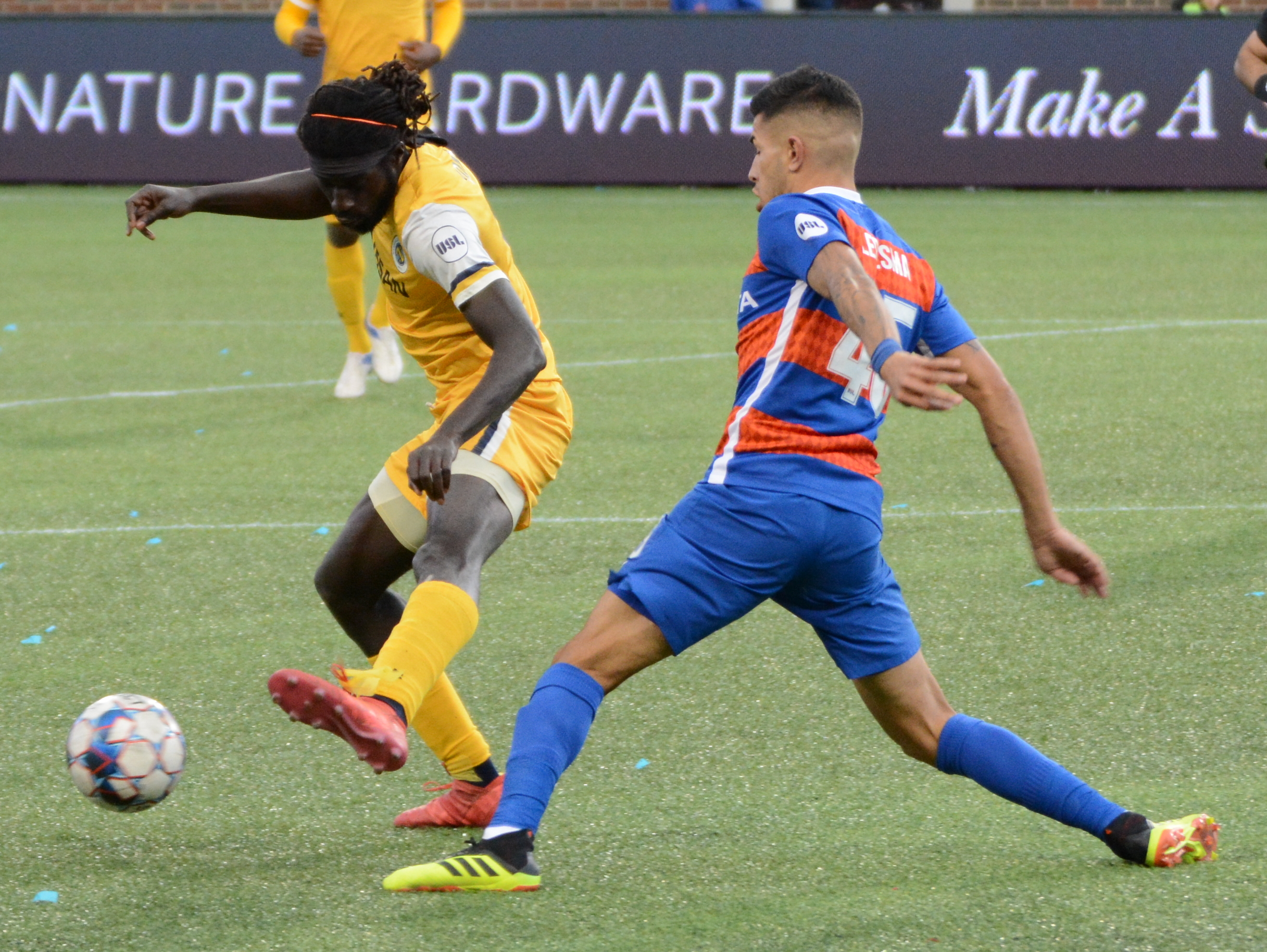
Jome (left) playing for Nashville SC in 2018

On May 22, 2018, Jome signed with USL side Nashville SC. On November 14, 2018, Nashville announced they had not re-signed Jome for the 2019 season.

=== Portland Timbers ===
On April 2, 2021, Jome was signed to a one-year contract by Major League Soccer side Portland Timbers. Later that month, the club announced Jome had ruptured his Achilles tendon in training and would be out for the remainder of the year. Following the 2021 season, Portland declined their contract option on Jome.

=== San Antonio FC ===
On June 21, 2023, Jome signed with USL Championship side San Antonio FC until the end of the 2023 season.

=== Spokane Velocity FC ===
On June 21, 2024, Jome signed with Spokane Velocity FC for its inaugural season in the USL League One. He would leave after the 2025 season.

== Honors and awards ==
=== Individual ===
UC Santa Barbara Gauchos

- All-Big West Conference First Team (2): 2013, 2014
- Big West Conference Freshman of the Year (1): 2013
- Soccer America All-Freshman First Team (1): 2013

Prairie Seeds Academy

- Minnesota State High School Soccer Coaches Association's "Mr. Soccer" (1): 2012
