= Solomon Asante =

Ghanaian footballer (born 1990)

Personal information
- Date of birth: 6 March 1990 (age 36)
- Place of birth: Kumasi, Ashanti, Ghana
- Height: 1.58 m (5 ft 2 in)
- Position: Winger

Youth career
- –2007: Feyenoord Ghana

Senior career*
Years	Team	Apps	(Gls)
2007–2009	Feyenoord Ghana	66	(12)
2009–2011	ASFA Yennenga	57	(39)
2011–2013	Berekum Chelsea	70	(21)
2013–2017	TP Mazembe	17	(4)
2018–2021	Phoenix Rising	107	(54)
2022–2023	Indy Eleven	58	(3)
2024	Las Vegas Lights	31	(0)
2025	Texoma FC	11	(4)

International career
2011	Burkina Faso	1	(0)
2012–	Ghana	21	(0)
- * Club domestic league appearances and goals

Solomon Asante (born 6 March 1990) is a Ghanaian former professional footballer who played as a winger. With Phoenix Rising FC, he was named the 2019 and 2020 USL Championship Most Valuable Player (MVP). With Indy Eleven, Asante became the first player in USL Championship history to record 50 career goals and career assists.

== Early life ==
Born in Ghana to Ghanaian parents, Asante started his career at the Ghanaian club Feyenoord Ghana, where he played until 2009.

== Club career ==
=== ASFA Yennenga ===
Asante joined Burkinabé club ASFA Yennenga from Feyenoord Ghana, at the beginning of the 2009–2010 season. In his second season with ASFA Yennenga he won the 2010–2011 Burkinabé Premier League, 2010–2011 top-goalscorer and was also the 2009–2010 Burkinabé Premier League top-goalscorer with 14 goals. He spent two season's with ASFA Yennenga.

=== Berekum Chelsea ===
Asante signed for Ghanaian Ghana Premier League club Berekum Chelsea at the beginning of the 2011–12 Ghana Premier League season.

=== TP Mazembe ===
Asante joined Congolese Ligue 1 club TP Mazembe in 2013. Asante departed the club in December 2017 following the expiration of his contract.

=== Phoenix Rising FC ===
Asante signed with Phoenix Rising FC of the United Soccer League on 21 December 2017. Asante left on 1 February 2022, after leading the club to two USL Championship Finals and the Regular Season Title in 2019. He was team captain for three of his four seasons.

=== Indy Eleven ===
On 11 April 2022, it was announced that Asante had signed with USL Championship side Indy Eleven. Asante scored his first goal for Indy Eleven on 23 July 2022 in a 1–1 draw with Memphis 901 FC. The goal was Asante's 50th goal in the USL Championship. Asante ended the 2022 season playing 25 league matches, scoring one goal and notching six assists.

Asante remained with Indy Eleven for the 2023 season, starting in the team's season opening 1–1 draw away to the Tampa Bay Rowdies on 11 March. Asante received his first yellow card of the season the following week in a 1–0 away win over Detroit City FC on 25 March. Asante scored his first goal of the season in a 2–3 home loss to Monterrey Bay FC on 22 April.

Asante became the first player in USL Championship history to total 50 career goals and 50 career assists on 9 August 2023 in a 4–0 home win over Birmingham Legion. In the same game, Asante tallied three assists in a single game for the third time in his USL Championship career.

Asante ended the season with two goals and six assists in 33 league games. Asante made one appearance in the 2023 U.S. Open Cup, substituting on in the 46th minute for Alann Torres in a 3–1 home win over NISA side Michigan Stars FC on 5 April.

Asante departed the club at the end of the 2023 season, totaling 59 league and cup games and 3 goals over two years.

=== Las Vegas Lights FC ===
USL Championship side Las Vegas Lights FC announced the signing of Asante on 23 February 2024, ahead of the 2024 USL Championship season. Asante made his first appearance for the Las Vegas-based side on 9 March, replacing Edison Azcona in the 55th minute in a 2–1 away loss to Memphis 901 FC. Asante made his first start for the Lights in a 3–1 home loss to FC Tulsa on 16 March.

=== Texoma FC ===
On 11 February 2025, Asante joined USL League One expansion club Texoma FC. He would retire after his contract with Texoma ended.

== International career ==
Asante made his debut for Burkina Faso against South Africa at Ellis Park on 8 August 2011 in an international friendly. He scored his first goal for Burkina Faso in the 87th minute scoring one goal. In November 2011, he dropped from the national team to join his home country Ghana.

=== Ghana national team ===
On 16 May 2012, Asante was called up to the Ghana squad for two 2014 World Cup qualification matches against Lesotho and Zambia but was later dropped due to concerns over his eligibility to play for Ghana. Asante has since been cleared to play for Ghana.

== Career statistics ==
As of 5 April 2025

Appearances and goals by club, season and competition
Club	Season	League			National cup		Other		Total	
Club	Season	Division	Apps	Goals	Apps	Goals	Apps	Goals	Apps	Goals
Phoenix Rising	2018	USL	36	14	0	0	4	1	40	15
Phoenix Rising	2019	USL Championship	34	22	1	0	2	0	37	22
Phoenix Rising	2020	USL Championship	17	8	0	0	3	2	20	10
Phoenix Rising	2021	USL Championship	26	10	0	0	0	0	26	10
Phoenix Rising	Total		113	54	1	0	9	3	123	57
Indy Eleven	2022	USL C	25	1	0	0	0	0	25	1
Indy Eleven	2023	USL C	33	2	1	0	0	0	34	2
Indy Eleven	Total		58	3	1	0	0	0	59	3
Las Vegas Lights	2024	USLC	31	0	0	0	0	0	31	0
Texoma FC	2025	USL League One	4	0	1	0	0	0	5	0
Career total			206	57	3	0	9	3	218	60

== Honours ==
ASFA Yennenga

- Burkinabé Premier League: 2010–11

Phoenix Rising

- USL Championship Regular Season: 2019
- Western Conference
  - Winners (Regular Season): 2019, 2021
  - Winners (Playoffs): 2018, 2020

Individual

- Burkinabé Premier League Top scorer: 2009–10, 2010–11
- Ghana Player of the Year: 2017
- USL Championship Most Valuable Player: 2019 & 2020
- USL Championship All-League First Team: 2018, 2019, 2020
- USL Championship Top scorer: 2019
- USL Championship Assists Champion: 2019, 2020
- Phoenix Rising Most Valuable Player (Fan's Choice): 2019
- Phoenix Rising Goal of the season: 2019
- Phoenix Rising Players Player of the year: 2019

Records

- Phoenix Rising's all-time top scorer with 36 goals – 2019.
- USL Championship most assists in a season (17) – 2019
- Phoenix Rising's single-season goal record.
- USL most combined goals and assists in a season.
