= Richard Kamara =

Liberian footballer

Personal information
- Full name: Richard Kamara
- Positions: Center-back; left back

Team information
- Current team: Minnesota Twin Stars
- Number: 17

Senior career*
Years	Team	Apps	(Gls)
2005–2011	Minnesota Twin Stars	??	(??)

International career
2000–2001	Liberia	2	(0)
- * Club domestic league appearances and goals

Richard Kamara is a Liberian former footballer who has represented the Liberia national football team, and played for the Minnesota Twin Stars.

== Minnesota Twin Stars ==
Kamara began playing with the Minnesota Twin Stars of the NPSL in 2005. After displays of consistency in a developing club team, he helped lead them to two back-to-back Midwest Regional titles, in 2008 and 2009, captaining the side in the 2008 season. Along with earning the captaincy, he was given the honor of becoming a Midwest Regional All-Star team member, winning this award in three consecutive seasons ('08,'09,'10). In the 2010 season, solid performances in the back earned Kamara the Midwest MVP award, becoming the third Twin Star player to do so in three seasons.

== Honors ==
=== Club ===
- NPSL Midwest League (2) : 2008, 2009
- NPSL National Finalist (1) : 2008

=== Individual ===
- Midwest Regional All-Star team (3) : 2008, 2009, 2010
- Midwest Regional MVP (1) : 2010
