= Preston Kilwien =

American soccer player

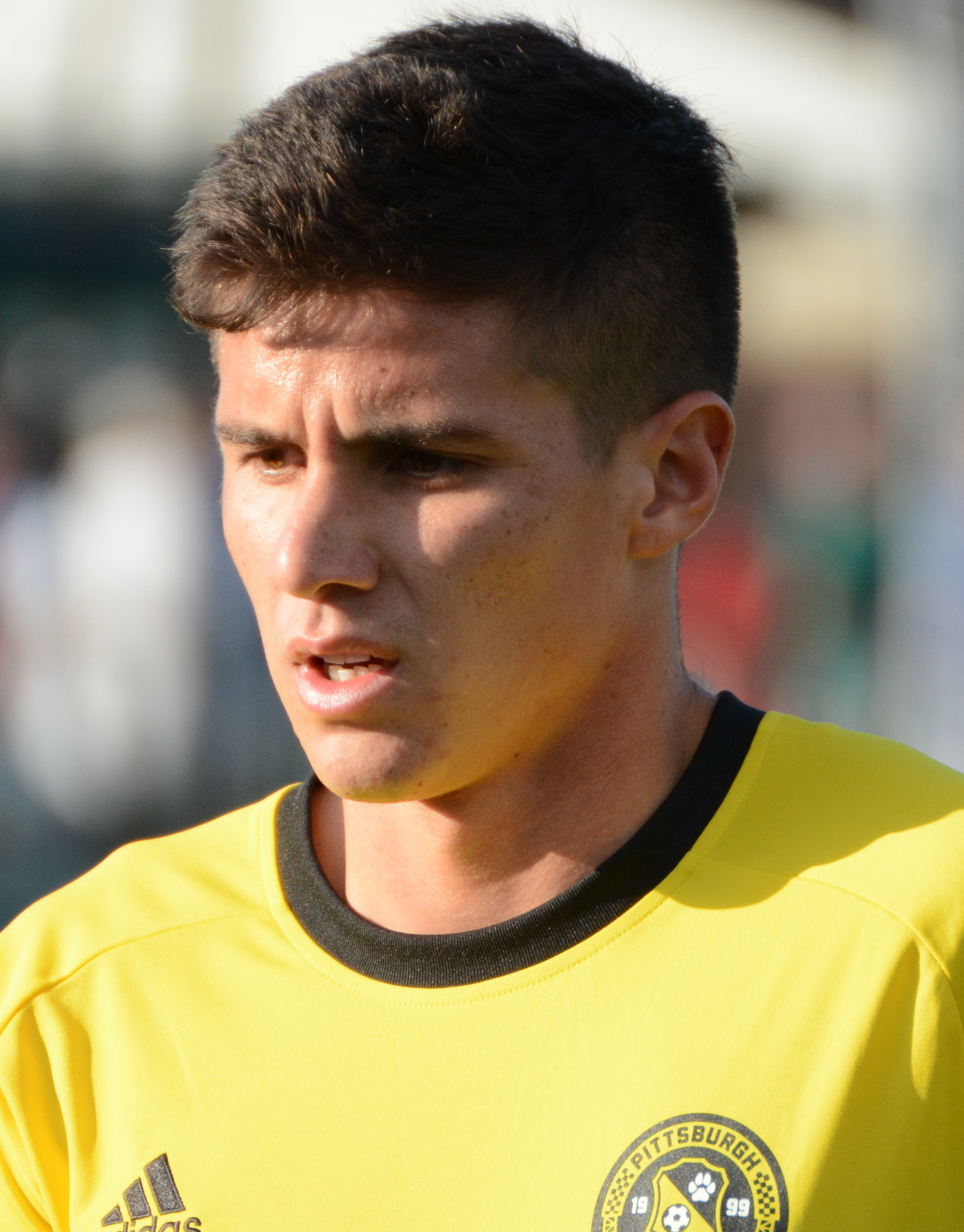
- Kilwien with Pittsburgh Riverhounds in 2021

Personal information
- Full name: Preston Kilwien
- Date of birth: November 25, 1996 (age 29)
- Place of birth: Lubbock, Texas, United States
- Height: 1.93 m (6 ft 4 in)
- Positions: Defender; current_club = Escorpiones

Youth career
- De Anza Force

College career
Years	Team	Apps	(Gls)
2015–2018	Florida Gulf Coast Eagles	60	(4)

Senior career*
Years	Team	Apps	(Gls)
2016	South Florida Surf	6	(1)
2017	Tampa Bay Rowdies U23	11	(0)
2018	Seattle Sounders FC U-23	10	(0)
2019–2020	New York Red Bulls II	36	(1)
2021	Pittsburgh Riverhounds	30	(0)
2022	Charleston Battery	28	(0)
2023–2024	South Georgia Tormenta	50	(0)
2025	Texoma FC	16	(0)
2026	Miami FC	3	(0)
2026	A.D. San Carlos	0	(0)
2026–	Escorpiones	6	(0)
- * Club domestic league appearances and goals as of 13:29, 8 November 2026 (UTC)~

Preston Alexander Kilwien (born November 25, 1996) is an American professional soccer player who plays as a defender for Liga FPD side Escorpiones de Belén Fútbol Club.

== Career ==
=== Professional ===
Following a 2-week trial, Kilwien signed a professional contract with New York Red Bulls II on March 8, 2019. He made his professional debut on April 13, 2019, in a 2–1 victory at Charlotte Independence. Kilwien made 24 appearances, among the most of rookies on the team, and started 18 games as a central defender for NYRB II in 2019. His 1,673 total minutes ranked ninth on the team. The club announced on December 4, 2019, it exercised the option on Kilwien's contract.

In April 2020 he represented New York Red Bulls II in the United Soccer League's USL eCup: Rocket League Edition. On August 13, 2020, he scored his first professional goal in a 2–1 loss to Loudoun United at Red Bull Arena. In 2020, his second year with the team, he played in 12 matches in a pandemic-shortened season and was third on the team in minutes played.

He was released by Red Bulls II on November 30, 2020.

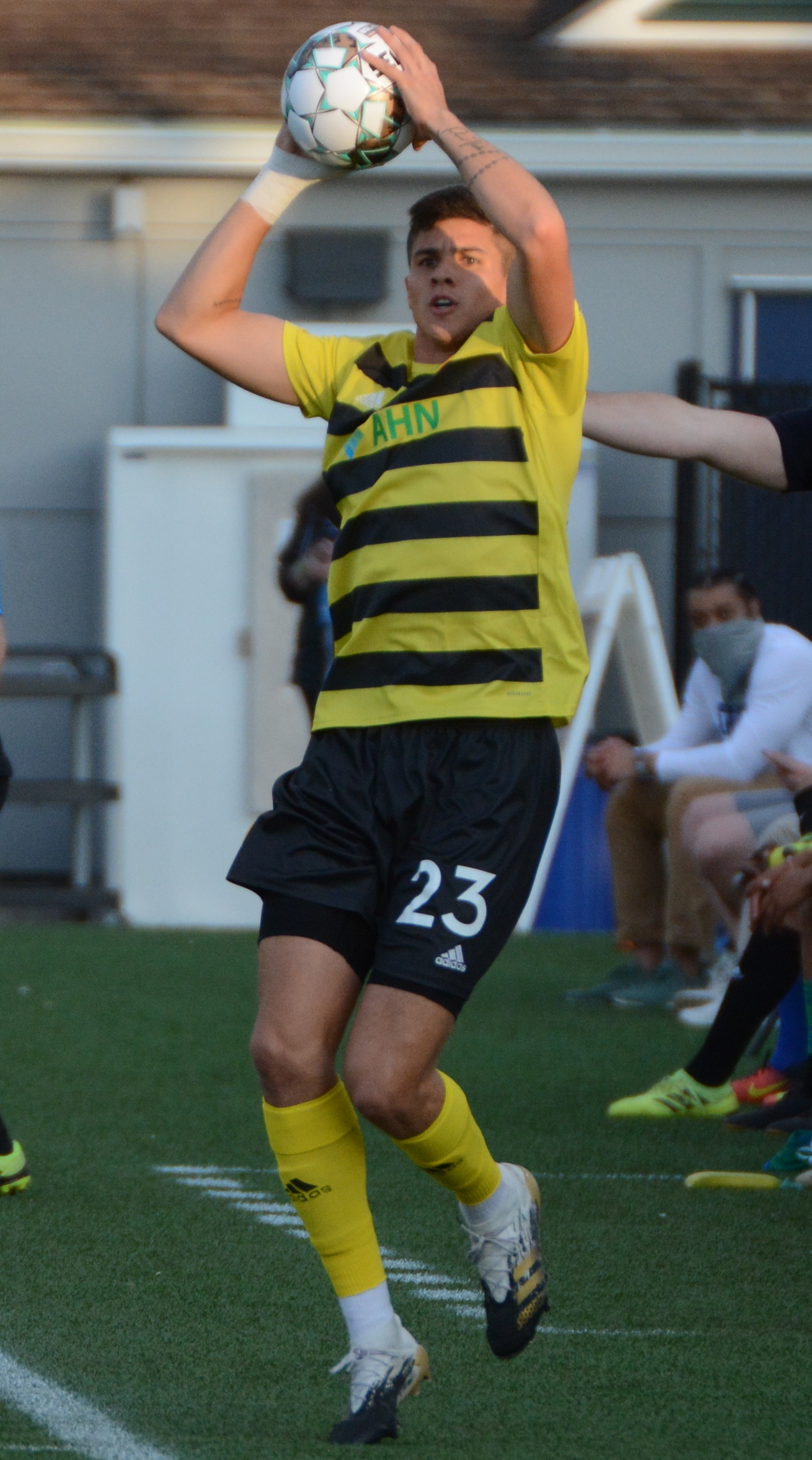
Kilwien making a throw-in for Pittsburgh Riverhounds in 2021

On January 21, 2021, Kilwien signed with USL Championship club Pittsburgh Riverhounds. He started 22 of his 30 appearances during the team's regular season he was fifth on the team with 941 total passes, fourth in clearances and fifth in interceptions. On June 2, 2021, he was named Man of the Match by USLChampionship.com following the team's 3–2 victory at Loudoun United. Following the conclusion of the regular season, Kilwien finished tied for runner-up as team's Defender of the Year in a fan vote by the team's Steel Army supporters group.

On December 31, 2021, Kilwien signed with USL Championship club Charleston Battery. In 2022, he finished fourth on the team in starts with 24, fifth in appearances with 28 and played the fourth-most minutes with 2,103. Kilwien earned the captain's armband on six occasions. He registered a team-high 20 blocks and was second in total passes with 1,182 and clearances with 71. Following the 2022 season, Kilwien was released by Charleston.

On January 23, 2023, he signed with defending USL League One champion South Georgia Tormenta on a two-year contract. On April 25, 2023, Kilwien was named to the USL League One Team of the Week after claiming his first professional assist on a Matheus Cassini match-winning goal at One Knoxville SC. The goal was selected as one of ESPN SportsCenter's Top 10 Plays of the Day and the match was Kilwien's 100th professional match appearance.

Kilwien ended the 2023 season with 28 USL League One appearances and two in the US Open Cup, finished second on the team in minutes played with 2,222 and led the squad in passes with 1,296, clearances with 101 and blocks with 21. He had the team's fourth-best passing accuracy at 85 percent and interceptions with 21. He finished fifth among league players in clearances.

In 2024, he was the only Tormenta FC player to start each of the team’s 30 league and Jagermeister Cup games. Including Kilwien's three U.S. Open Cup appearances, he started and appeared in 33 of the team's 34 total contests. Kilwien led the team in minutes played and blocked shots, while finishing second in passing, interceptions and clearances. He ranked among the top 10 in USL League One in clearances. He was named the team’s Player of the Month twice, in June and August and was named in the USL Team of the Week on August 20. Kilwien finished sixth among all players in USL League One in minutes played and was one of just 12 players to start all 22 regular season league matches. He became a free agent upon the expiration of his contract.

Kilwien signed for USL League One expansion side Texoma FC on January 30, 2025. He started 15 of his 16 USL League One appearances during the season, while starting the team's lone U.S. Open Cup contest and two of its four USL Jägermeister Cup contests. The team released its entire professional roster after dropping out of USL League One.

Kilwien signed for USL Championship expansion side Miami FC on December 17, 2025. Following a mutual termination of his agreement with Miami FC, Kilwien signed a contract with A.D. San Carlos on June 3, 2026.. On July 30, 2026, he terminated his agreement with A.D. San Carlos due to uncertainties related to the team's financial difficulties.

On August 4, Kilwien signed a contract to join Escorpiones de Belén Fútbol Club for the 2026-27 Apertura and Clausura seasons.

=== College ===
Kilwien spent his entire college career at Florida Gulf Coast University, receiving a B.A. in Integrated Studies in May 2020. He made a total of 60 appearances for the Eagles and tallied 4 goals and 5 assists. In summer 2019 he was named FGCU's Most Outstanding Male Athlete. During his senior year at FGCU, he was named United Soccer Coaches Second Team All-Atlantic Region, ASUN Conference Defensive Player of the Year, and First Team All-ASUN Conference. As a junior in 2017, Kilwien was named Second Team All-ASUN Conference and was a member of the ASUN Conference All-Freshman Team in 2015.

During his four years, FGCU compiled a 38–19–11 record, claimed two ASUN Conference championships and earned a second round 2016 NCAA Division I Men's Soccer Tournament appearance. He scored the game-winning goal against Princeton on a 35-yard volley in his first college appearance in 2015, which was selected as the No. 3 play on ESPN SportsCenter's top 10 plays.

While at college, Kilwien played for Premier Development League sides South Florida Surf, Seattle Sounders U23 and Tampa Bay Rowdies U23. In 2016, he was named to the PDL Team of the Week. In 2018, he was named one of the league's preseason top 50 professional prospects.

=== Youth ===
Kilwien began playing organized soccer at the age of four. He played club soccer for DeAnza Force SC (Cupertino, Calif.) at ages U8-9 then again at USSDA U17-18. He also spent time as a youth with Crossfire Premier (Redmond, Wash.), Snohomish United (Shohomish, Wash.) East Bay Eclipse (Moraga, Calif.) and Diablo FC (Concord, Calif.). In 2016, he helped lead FC Florida to the United States Youth Soccer Association U19 national championship final. He played three soccer seasons at Campolindo High School, twice earning Offensive MVP honors, and also played receiver on the football team. He graduated in 2015 from College Park High School (Pleasant Hill, California).

== Personal life ==
On December 20, 2024, Kilwien married Camila Perez in Coral Gables, Florida. In June 2026, he received a master's degree in data science from Bellevue University.

He was born in Lubbock, Texas to Richard and Karen (Yee) Kilwien. His mother is a Limón, Costa Rica native. She was a prep All-America and TABC Class 5A Player of the Year at Alief Elsik High School in Houston, Texas and played three seasons as a scholarship women's basketball student-athlete at the University of Houston. Kilwien holds both United States and Costa Rica citizenship.

Preston Said to Legión A Lo Tico (A Costa Rican Sports medium) that he wants to play with the Costa Rica's National Team. In October 2022 he explained his dual citizenship status during a Charleston Battery recognition of Hispanic Heritage Month.

== Career statistics ==
As of August 4, 2026

Club	Season	Division	League		League Cup		US Open Cup		Continental		Total	
Club	Season	Division	Apps	Goals	Apps	Goals	Apps	Goals	Apps	Goals	Apps	Goals
New York Red Bulls II	2019	USLC	24	0	0	0	0	0	0	0	24	0
New York Red Bulls II	2020	USLC	12	1	0	0	0	0	0	0	12	1
New York Red Bulls II	Total		36	1	0	0	0	0	0	0	36	1
Pittsburgh Riverhounds	2021	USLC	30	0	0	0	0	0	0	0	30	0
Charleston Battery	2022	USLC	28	0	0	0	0	0	0	0	28	0
Charleston Battery	Total		58	0	0	0	0	0	0	0	58	0
South Georgia Tormenta FC	2023	USL1	28	0	0	0	2	0	0	0	30	0
South Georgia Tormenta FC	2024	USL1	22	0	8	0	3	0	0	0	33	0
South Georgia Tormenta FC	Total		50	0	8	0	5	0	0	0	63	0
Texoma FC	2025	USL1	16	0	3	0	1	0	0	0	20	0
Miami FC	2026	USLC	3	0	1	0	0	0	0	0	0	0
A.D. San Carlos	2026	Liga FPD	0	0	0	0	0	0	0	0	0	0
Escorpiones de Belén Fútbol Club	2026	Liga FPD	0	0	0	0	0	0	0	0	0	0
Career total			163	1	12	0	6	0	0	0	181	1
