= Geoffrey Myers =

Liberian footballer (born 1986)

Personal information
- Full name: Geoffrey Myers
- Date of birth: 6 March 1986 (age 40)
- Place of birth: Liberia
- Height: 5 ft 9 in (1.75 m)
- Position: Forward

Senior career*
Years	Team	Apps	(Gls)
2007–2008	Minnesota Twin Stars	12	(14)
2009	Minnesota Thunder	15	(0)
2011	Minnesota Twin Stars	3	(0)
- * Club domestic league appearances and goals as of 22 October 2009

Geoffrey Myers (born 6 March 1986) is a Liberian former footballer.

== Career ==
=== Youth and amateur ===
Myers came to the United States from his native Liberia in 2002, at the age of 16, settling in New Hope, Minnesota. He was a standout soccer player for Robbinsdale Armstrong High School, scoring 70 goals in his three years with the team, despite only attending from his sophomore through his senior year. He was named Star Tribune Metro Player of the Year as a junior and senior, only the second player in history to be so named (the other being Manny Lagos).

=== Professional ===
Following a trial with Major League Soccer team Real Salt Lake in 2006, Myers played two seasons for St. Paul Twin Stars in the National Premier Soccer League and was again a goalscoring standout, netting 14 goals and registering five assists in the St. Paul's run to the 2008 NPSL Championship game. He was also named NPSL Midwest MVP in 2008.

Myers signed with Minnesota Thunder of the USL First Division on March 23, 2009, with Thunder head coach Donny Gramenz saying "[Geoffrey] Myers is an explosive forward that is comfortable with his back to goal, and also likes to get behind the opposing team’s defense. He has been training with the team since November and has made tremendous strides with his fitness, work rate and tactical understanding." Myers made his professional debut on April 18, 2009, in a game against the Austin Aztex.

Myers went on a highly regarded invited trial with the Mpumalanga Black Aces of the Premier Soccer League in South Africa during the spring of 2011, but decided to return to action with the Minnesota Twin Stars for the 2011 season.
