= Jules Alex Nyom =

Cameroonian footballer

Personal information
- Full name: Jules Alex Nyom
- Date of birth: 3 January 1984 (age 42)
- Place of birth: Mfou, Cameroon
- Height: 6 ft 1 in (1.85 m)
- Position: Goalkeeper

Team information
- Current team: RoPS

Senior career*
Years	Team	Apps	(Gls)
??–??	Etoile of Essazock	??	(??)
??–2009	Canon de Yaounde	??	(??)
2007–2010	Minnesota Twin Stars	??	(??)
2010–2011	RoPS	11	(0)
- * Club domestic league appearances and goals as of 27 February 2011 ‡ National team caps and goals as of 27 February 2011

Jules Alex Nyom (born 3 January 1984), is a Cameroonian soccer goalkeeper, who last played in 2011.

He played for clubs in Cameroon, USA and for the Finnish football club, Rovaniemen Palloseura.

== Career ==
=== Early career ===
Nyom played for the Etoile of Essazock and Canon de Yaounde in Cameroon, ES Sétif in Algeria.

=== Minnesota Twin Stars ===
In 2007, he signed with Minnesota Twin Stars. During the 2008 season, he helped the team win their first Midwest Regional title; he missed the Final Four National Championship in New York and they lost in the final 2–1 to the Pennsylvania Stoners. In 2009 he was team captain for the NPSL Final Four Tournament (as Juan Fiz was injured), winning another Midwest Region title, earning a name on the Midwest All-Star team, but eventually losing to Sonoma County Sol 4–1.

=== RoPS ===
In 2010 Nyom signed for RoPS of Finland. In his second match he received a Man of the Match award. Nyom played a total of 11 games in the 2010 season, shutting out the opposition in 7 matches. These performances during the regular season led to the team finishing as champions of the Ykkönen, and a secured promotion to the Veikkausliiga for the 2011 season.

Nyom made 35 appearances for RoPs; 32 in the league, and 3 in the cup before being released in 2011.
