= Davey Mason =

American soccer player (born 1998)

Personal information
- Full name: David Mason
- Date of birth: May 21, 1998 (age 28)
- Place of birth: Bethesda, Maryland, United States
- Height: 5 ft 11 in (1.80 m)
- Position: Defender

Team information
- Current team: New York Cosmos
- Number: 16

Youth career
- 2005–2015: Montgomery SC Falcons
- 2015–2016: Bethesda Olney Academy

College career
Years	Team	Apps	(Gls)
2016–2017	Georgetown Hoyas	21	(0)
2018–2019	Loyola Greyhounds	36	(2)

Senior career*
Years	Team	Apps	(Gls)
2019	FC Baltimore Christos	3	(0)
2021–2022	Maryland Bobcats	31	(1)
2023	South Georgia Tormenta	30	(0)
2024	Maryland Bobcats	13	(0)
2025	Texoma FC	18	(0)
2026–	New York Cosmos	8	(0)
- * Club domestic league appearances and goals as of September 5, 2026

David Mason (born May 21, 1998) is an American soccer player who plays as a defender for New York Cosmos.

== Career ==
=== Youth, college, and amateur ===
Mason attended Walt Whitman High School, where he won a state championship. He was named NSCAA Fall High School All-Mid-Atlantic as a junior, including on All-America Watch List for two-straight seasons in high school, and was All-Met First Team, First-Team All-State, and All-South Region. He also played club soccer with both MSC Falcons and Bethesda Olney.

In 2016, Mason attended Georgetown University to play college soccer. In two seasons with the Hoyas, Mason made 21 appearances, tallying a total of two assists, and was named to Big East All-Academic Team. In 2018, he transferred to Loyola University Maryland to play a further two seasons at the college level. With the Greyhounds, he made 36 appearances, scored two goals, and tallied seven assists. He was a two-time All-Patriot League Second Team selection, a two-time Patriot League All-Tournament Team Academic All-Patriot League selection, and was included on the United Soccer Coaches All-Atlantic Region Third Team.

In 2019, Mason also played in the National Premier Soccer League with FC Baltimore Christos, making three-regular season appearances and a single appearance in the Lamar Hunt US Open Cup.

=== Maryland Bobcats ===
In 2021, Mason signed with the National Independent Soccer Association side Maryland Bobcats. He played in 31 league games for the Bobcats over the two seasons and was named to "Protagonist Soccer's Knights Who Say NISA's 2022 Best XI".

=== Tormenta FC ===
On March 8, 2023, Mason signed a one-year deal with USL League One side South Georgia Tormenta. On March 17, 2023, Mason made his debut for Tormenta, appearing as a starter in a 1-0 opening day victory over North Carolina FC. Mason appeared in 30 league matches and recorded 3 assists during the season.

=== Return to Maryland Bobcats ===
In April 2024, he moved to his former club, Maryland Bobcats. Mason appeared in 13 matches as a starter, helping the club capture the NISA Eastern Conference Championship.

=== Texoma FC ===
On March 11, 2025, Mason signed with USL League One side Texoma FC. Mason made his debut with Texoma on March 22, 2025, appearing as a starter in the clubs inaugural match, a 2-0 loss to One Knoxville SC. In one season at the club he appeared in 18 league matches.

=== New York Cosmos ===
On December 19, 2025, the veteran left back Mason joined USL League One side New York Cosmos ahead of their return to professional competition.

== Career statistics ==
As of match played September 6, 2026

Appearances and goals by club, season and competition
Club	Season	League			National cup		League cup		Other		Total	
Club	Season	Division	Apps	Goals	Apps	Goals	Apps	Goals	Apps	Goals	Apps	Goals
FC Baltimore Christos	2019	NPSL	3	0	1	0	0	0	0	0	4	0
Maryland Bobcats	2021	NISA	11	0	0	0	—		0	0	11	0
Maryland Bobcats	2022	NISA	20	1	1	0	—		1	0	22	1
Maryland Bobcats	Total		31	1	1	0	0	0	1	0	33	1
Tormenta FC	2023	USL League One	30	0	2	0	0	0	0	0	32	0
Maryland Bobcats	2024	NISA	13	0	0	0	—		0	0	13	0
Texoma FC	2025	USL League One	18	0	0	0	0	0	0	0	18	0
New York Cosmos	2026	USL League One	8	0	0	0	3	0	0	0	11	0
Career total			103	1	4	0	3	0	1	0	111	1
