= Jordan Chavez =

American soccer player (born 1997)

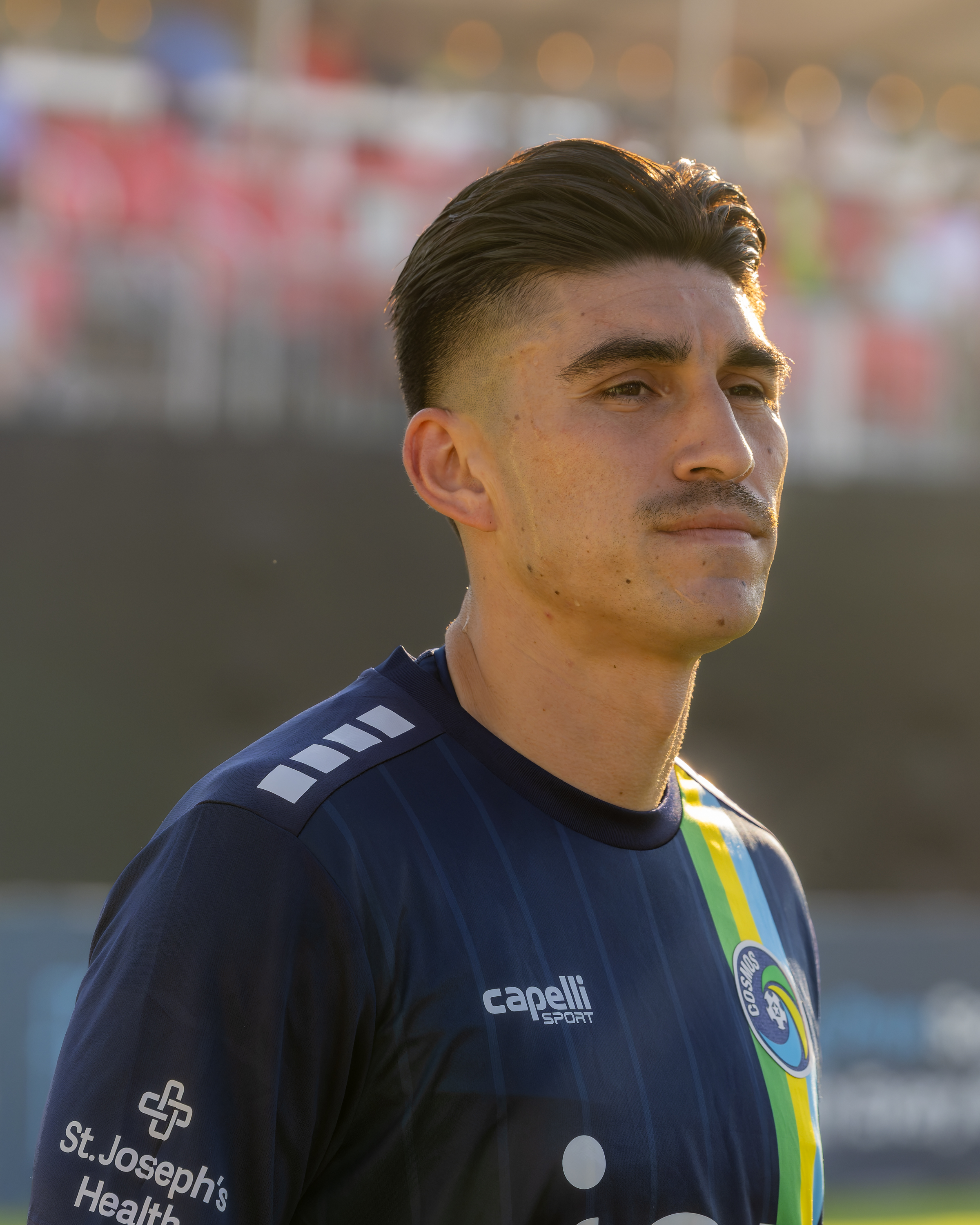
- Chavez with the NY Cosmos in 2026

Personal information
- Full name: Sergio Jordan Chavez
- Date of birth: February 28, 1997 (age 29)
- Place of birth: San Diego, California, U.S.
- Height: 1.85 m (6 ft 1 in)
- Position: Defender

Team information
- Current team: New York Cosmos
- Number: 25

Youth career
- Albion SC

College career
Years	Team	Apps	(Gls)
2015–2018	UNLV Rebels	74	(3)

Senior career*
Years	Team	Apps	(Gls)
2019	Chula Vista FC		
2020–2021	San Diego Loyal	3	(0)
2022–2023	Central Valley Fuego	54	(3)
2024	Orange County SC	10	(0)
2025	Texoma FC	28	(2)
2026–	New York Cosmos	22	(1)
- * Club domestic league appearances and goals as of September 5, 2026

Sergio Jordan Chavez (born February 28, 1997) is an American professional soccer player who plays as a defender for USL League One side New York Cosmos.

== Early years ==
Born in San Diego, Chavez grew up in nearby Chula Vista and attended Mater Dei Catholic High School, where he was a three-time first-team all-league performer for the Crusaders. At the club level, he played for Albion SC.

Chavez attended the University of Nevada, Las Vegas, where he played four seasons of college soccer for the Rebels from 2015 to 2018, playing 74 games and starting 67. He scored his first goal during his freshman season, an outside-the-box strike during their 3–2 win over his hometown SDSU Aztecs in San Diego.

== Club career ==
=== San Diego Loyal ===
After graduating from college, Chavez returned home and spent time with local semi-pro side Chula Vista FC, where he was spotted by San Diego Loyal manager Landon Donovan and his staff. He signed with the Loyal in the summer of 2020 during the league suspension due to the COVID-19 pandemic. Chavez and fellow Chula Vista native Austin Guerrero joined the team just prior to the return to play, and he was able to give the news of his first pro contract to his dad on Father's Day. He was first called up to a matchday squad on August 1, but remained an unused substitute during their scoreless draw against Sacramento Republic FC. He remained unused throughout the rest of the regular season as the Loyal failed to qualify for the USL Championship playoffs.

It was announced Chavez would return to the team for the 2021 season. "He has grown tremendously over the course of the past year and his future is extremely bright. He embodies all of our values and we look forward to his continued development," said Donovan of his progress. He made his professional debut on May 13, coming on for Hunter Ashworth during their 3–1 loss to Tacoma Defiance. Chavez earned his first start three months later at centre back during a 2–1 home defeat to Orange County SC.

=== Central Valley Fuego ===
On February 15, 2022, Chavez was signed by USL League One club Central Valley Fuego. On May 22, 2022, Chavez scores his first goal as a professional in a 4-0 victory over Tormenta FC. In two seasons with the club, he logged over 4,000 minutes across 54 games played, recording three goals and two assists.

=== Orange County SC ===
On June 14, 2024, Chavez signed a 25-day contract with USL Championship side Orange County SC. He made his team debut the following day, coming on as an 88th-minute substitute for Brian Iloski in a 4–2 defeat to Colorado Springs Switchbacks FC, and made ten appearances overall.

=== Texoma FC ===
Chavez joined USL League One expansion club Texoma FC on January 28, 2025, as the second signing in team history. He was named team captain ahead of the club's inaugural game. Chavez scored his first goal for the club on July 5, 2025 in a 2–0 victory over Forward Madison.

=== New York Cosmos ===
Chavez signed with USL League One club New York Cosmos on March 13, 2026. On September 5 2026, Chavez scored his first league goal for Cosmos in 4-2 victory over Fort Wayne FC.

== Career statistics ==
As of match played September 5, 2026

Appearances and goals by club, season and competition
Club	Season	League			National cup		League cup		Other		Total	
Club	Season	Division	Apps	Goals	Apps	Goals	Apps	Goals	Apps	Goals	Apps	Goals
San Diego Loyal	2021	USL Championship	3	0	0	0	0	0	0	0	3	0
Central Valley Fuego	2022	USL League One	26	1	2	0	0	0	0	0	28	1
Central Valley Fuego	2023	USL League One	27	2	1	0	0	0	1	0	28	2
Orange County SC	2024	USL Championship	10	0	0	0	0	0	0	0	10	0
Texoma FC	2025	USL League One	28	2	0	0	2	0	0	0	30	2
New York Cosmos	2026	USL League One	22	1	0	0	2	1	0	0	24	2
Career total			116	6	3	0	4	1	0	0	123	7
