= Angelo Calfo =

American soccer player (born 1998)

Personal information
- Full name: Angelo Calfo Junior
- Date of birth: November 4, 1998 (age 28)
- Height: 6 ft 2 in (1.88 m)
- Positions: Center back; defensive midfielder

Team information
- Current team: Miami FC
- Number: 4

Youth career
- –2011: Blue Arrows
- 2011–2012: Seattle United
- 2012–2018: Crossfire Premier
- 2018–2019: RIASA

College career
Years	Team	Apps	(Gls)
2020–23	Gonzaga Bulldogs	31	(1)

Senior career*
Years	Team	Apps	(Gls)
2021	Portland Timbers U23	9	(0)
2022	Ballard FC	10	(0)
2023	Flower City Union	16	(0)
2024	Weston Bears FC	15	(0)
2025	Texoma FC	25	(0)
2026–	Miami FC	25	(0)
- * Club domestic league appearances and goals as of November 7, 2026 ‡ National team caps and goals as of August 12, 2026

Angelo Calfo Jr. (born November 4, 1998) is an American professional soccer player who currently plays in the USL Championship for Miami FC.

== Youth career ==
Calfo started his youth career with local side Blue Arrows before spending the majority of his time at Crossfire Premier with head coach Bernie James.

In 2011 he was selected by Marco Monti to train with Inter Milan in Italy for two weeks. He trained with the U14 academy team at Centro Sportivo Giacinto Facchetti.

=== RIASA ===
In 2018 Calfo travelled to Leeds, England to join the RIASA program under coach John Hendrie. In a 2020 interview with The Athletic, he explained why he joined the programme. In his second year Calfo captained the side to the finals of the JFC Youth Championships in Shenzhen, China.

== College career ==
Calfo returned to the United States in 2020 to join the Gonzaga Bulldogs in NCAA Division I. He was named to the West Coast Conference All-Academic Team for 2020.

== Senior career ==
=== Cascadia ===
Whilst in the UK he was called up by the Cascadian Football Federation. Calfo made two appearances against The Chagos Islands and Darfur respectively, scoring one goal.

=== Portland Timbers U23 ===
In 2021, during his off-season with Gonzaga he played 9 matches with Portland Timbers U23. He débuted on June 4, 2021, in a 3–0 win over OVF Alliance.

=== Ballard ===
The following year, he captained Ballard FC in their inaugural season. In total he played 10 games for The Bridges, all at center half.

=== Flower City Union ===
After a successful trial, Calfo agreed a deal to join Flower City Union for the 2023 season. He made his first league appearance on April 1, 2023, in a 1–0 defeat against Maryland Bobcats and registered his first assist three days later in a US Open Cup match against Manhattan SC. His first start came on April 22 in a 1–0 loss to Chattanooga FC.

=== Weston Workers ===
Calfo joined Weston Bears FC for the 2024 season to play under head coach Kew Jaliens.

=== Texoma ===
In 2025 he returned to the United States to sign for Texoma FC with Adrian Forbes.

=== Miami FC ===
Calfo signed a two-year contract with Miami FC at the start of the 2026 season in the USL Championship.

== Career statistics ==
As of matches played 7 November 2026

Appearances and goals by club, season and competition
Club	Season	League			National Cup (Note: Includes appearances in the U.S. Open Cup)		Continental		Other		Total	
Club	Season	Division	Apps	Goals	Apps	Goals	Apps	Goals	Apps	Goals	Apps	Goals
Portland Timbers U23	2021	USL League Two	9	0	0	0	0	0	—		9	0
Ballard FC	2022	USL League Two	10	0	0	0	0	0	—		10	0
Flower City Union	2023	NISA	16	0	2	0	0	0	3 (Note: appearances in the NISA Championship Playoffs)	0	21	0
Weston Bears	2024	NPL	15	0	0	0	0	0	0	0	15	0
Texoma FC	2025	USL League One	25	0	1	0	0	0	3 (Note: appearances in the USL Cup)	0	29	0
Miami FC	2026	USL Championship	25	0	0	0	0	0	5 (Note: Four appearances in the USL Cup and one appearance in the USL Championship Playoffs)	0	30	0
Career total			100	0	3	0	0	0	11	0	114	0

== Honours ==
=== Team ===
Flower City Union

- 2023 NISA Championship.
