= Texoma FC =

Soccer club based in Sherman, Texas

- Full name: Texoma Football Club
- Founded: October 23, 2023; 2 years ago
- Ground: Munson Stadium, Denison, Texas
- Capacity: 6,500
- CEO: Jacob West
- President: Ben Watson
- Head coach: Adrian Forbes
- League: USL League Two
- 2025: USL League One, 12th of 14
- Website: texomafc.com
Home colors	Away colors

Texoma Football Club is a men's semi-professional soccer club based in Sherman, Texas. Owned by Jacob West and Ben Watson, the club competes in USL League Two, an amateur league in the United States league system. It plays its home games at Munson Stadium, located in the neighboring city of Denison. Texoma was founded as a fully-professional outfit in 2023, entering USL League One as an expansion team. It played a sole season in the league in 2025, before electing to move down to League Two.

== History ==
=== USL League One ===
On October 23, 2023, the United Soccer League announced that North Sixth Group had been granted a USL League One expansion team in Sherman, Texas, to start play in the 2025 season followed by a women's pre-professional team in USL W League in 2026. The team had been in the making for at least four months beforehand, with co-owners Jacob West and Ben Watson being soccer veterans with local ties to the city of Sherman. The club will play in Historic Bearcat Stadium until a permanent stadium is built.

The club's name and logo were unveiled on December 14, 2023.

On May 9, 2024, the club announced Adrian Forbes as the team's inaugural sporting director. Forbes was announced to be the team's first-ever head coach on October 17, 2024, combining that position with his role as sporting director.

Texoma finished their inaugural season in League One in 12th, missing the playoffs. After the regular season concluded, the USL announced that Texoma was self-relegating to USL League Two for at least the 2026 season.

=== USL League Two ===
Adrian Forbes departed the club following its self-relegation. Ben Clarvis will be Texoma's head coach for the 2026 season, assisted by Tristan England and Solomon Asante, the latter of whom played for Texoma in 2025. Texoma will begin its second season, and first in League Two, away to Fort Worth Vaqueros FC.

== Colors and badge ==
The club's nickname, colors and crest were unveiled on December 14, 2023. The crest features two stylized birds: a Northern mockingbird and a Scissor-tailed flycatcher (the state birds of Texas and Oklahoma, respectively), standing over a soccer ball. The club colors are identified as magnolia and red; magnolia being a reference to the nickname of nearby Durant, Oklahoma, which is known as the "city of magnolias", and red represents the Red River that separates the two states.

== Management team ==
Position	Name
Interim CEO	(United States) Jacob West
President	(United States) Ben Watson
Head coach Sporting director	(England) Ben Clarvis
Assistant coach	Tristan England (Ghana) Solomon Asante
Goalkeeping coach	Vacant

== Players ==
=== 2025 roster ===
As of July 8, 2025

Note: Flags indicate national team as defined under FIFA eligibility rules; some limited exceptions apply. Players may hold more than one non-FIFA nationality.

No.	Pos.	Nation	Player
1	GK	USA	Mason McCready
2	DF	USA	Reid Valentine
3	MF	USA	Ozzie Ramos
4	DF	USA	Preston Kilwien
6	MF	USA	Leland Gray
7	FW	USA	Brandon McManus
8	MF	ENG	Luke McCormick
9	FW	USA	Diego Pepi (on loan from FC Dallas)
10	MF	USA	Ajmeer Spengler
12	DF	USA	Jordan Chavez
13	GK	USA	Javier Garcia
14	MF	USA	Jon Paul Jordan II
15	MF	RSA	Phila Dlamini

No.	Pos.	Nation	Player
16	DF	USA	Davey Mason
17	FW	POL	Maciej Bortniczuk
11	MF	CAN	Dane Domić
19	FW	CTA	Donald Benamna
20	FW	GHA	Solomon Asante
22	DF	USA	William Perkins
23	FW	ENG	Teddy Baker
25	MF	CAN	Damian Iamarino
26	GK	USA	Aren Seeger
27	DF	USA	Patrick Staszewski
30	FW	GAM	Lamin Jawneh
35	FW	USA	Brayan Padilla
36	DF	USA	Alejandro Padilla

== Statistics and records ==
=== Year-by-year ===
As of November 8, 2025

Season	USL League One									Playoffs	US Open Cup	USL Cup	Top Goalscorer	
Season	P	W	D	L	GF	GA	Pts	PPG	Position	Playoffs	US Open Cup	USL Cup	Player	Goals
2025	30	7	9	14	35	55	30	1.00	12th	Did not qualify	First Round	Group Stage	(United States) Ajmeer Spengler	9
Season	USL League Two									Playoffs	US Open Cup	USL Cup	Top Goalscorer	
Season	P	W	D	L	GF	GA	Pts	PPG	Position	Playoffs	US Open Cup	USL Cup	Player	Goals
2026	12	9	0	3	28	12	18	1.50	1st, Ranger	Conference Quarterfinals	did not qualify	N/A		
Total	42	16	9	17	63	67	48	1.14	–	–	–	–	-	-

1. Top goalscorer(s) includes all goals scored in League, USL League One Playoffs, U.S. Open Cup, USL Cup, and other competitive matches.

=== Coaching records ===
As of July 15, 2025

Coach	From	To	Record				
Coach	From	To	G	W	D	L	Win %
(England) Adrian Forbes	October 17, 2024	Present	30	7	9	14	23.33
Total			30	7	9	14	23.33
