= Prairie Seeds Academy =

Coordinates: 45°03′58.3″N 93°22′28.0″W

Location
- 6200 W Broadway Ave N Brooklyn Park, Minnesota 55428; United States

Information
- Type: Charter
- Motto: Molding Future Generations
- Established: 2004
- Executive Director: Kita Her
- Grades: K-12
- Enrollment: 246 (2016-17)
- Colors: Red, Black and White
- Mascot: Lycan
- Website: www.psak12.org

Prairie Seeds Academy is a charter school located in Brooklyn Park, Minnesota, United States, a northwest suburb of Minneapolis. PSA is an IB World School, and is a member of the National Honor Society (NHS). PSA offers a rigorous educational program focusing on core content areas and standards mandated by the state of Minnesota in reading, writing, mathematics, science, and social studies, heritage (native) language and culture, multicultural arts, crafts, and music, and a responsive classroom/social curriculum, as well its renowned Soccer and Basketball athletic program. PSA is home to more than 800+ students. PSA students and Alumni are referred to as Lycans, after the school's mascot.

== School history ==
Prairie Seeds Academy was established in 2004 in North Minneapolis. The Academy was found by Cha-Ger Yang, his wife Choua Yang, and other teachers in the Minneapolis. Choua Yang served as a teacher in the school and as its principal. She was honored by the Hmong National Development Inc in 2017 with their educational impact award. The Academy was created to focus on Hmong Literacy and Culture. In its first year, PSA held classes for kindergarten through 5th grade, two classes per grade, with nearly 120 students. Eventually the Academy was approved by the Minnesota Department of Education and developed a full K-8 curriculum. In 2006–07 of their third year of operations, the Academy outgrew its North Minneapolis facility with over 400 students and was relocated to the City of Brooklyn Park. On February 14, 2008, Prairie Seeds Academy submitted a request for grade expansion to include high school as well. It was approved on July 23, 2008 and it began its high school classes for the 2008–09 school year. In June 2010 the Academy graduated its first graduating class of 55 students, many of whom received full or partial scholarships to colleges and universities across the country.

== PSA Athletics and activities ==
=== Boys' soccer ===
==== Section and state record ====
Year	Class	Section	State
2010	5A	Champions	Champions
2011	5A	Champions	Runner-up
2012	5A	Champions	Disqualified
2013	5AA	Champions	Quarter-finals

Prairie Seeds Academy entered into the Minnesota State High School League (MSHSL) in 2009 with two sports, soccer and basketball for boys and girls. The Boys' junior varsity soccer team went all the way to the Class A Section 5 quarter-final in 2009, losing out to Fridley High School 1-2.

In 2010, the Boys' varsity soccer team won Section 5A, in a rematch of the previous years quarter-final against Fridley, this time winning comfortably 4-0. They went on to the State Tournament and won their first State Title in a thrilling 3-2 victory over Mankato East. They finished the season 21–0–1.

In the 2011 season, the Boys' varsity soccer team repeated a section triumph, beating Totino-Grace 6–0 in the final. Although they made it all the way to the final, they suffered a shock 1–3 defeat at the hands of Benilde-St. Margaret's; their first defeat in program history. They finished the season 19–1–2.

The 2012 season brought another Section 5A final match-up between PSA and Totino-Grace, and the Lycans' pulled out a last-minute winner, with the score ending up 2–1. The match ended in a brawl, and in further investigation, the Boys' soccer team was disqualified from the State Tournament. They finished the season 15–0.

In 2013, the Lycans' were brought up to Class AA, in order to play at a higher level of competition. Although they were underdogs according to the seeding (ranked #6 out of 8 teams), they won the section, beating Maple Grove 2–0 in the final, retaining an undefeated record into the State Tournament. However, the Lycans' season ended unexpectedly early against North St. Paul in a 1–2 loss. They finished the season 15–1.

In 2012 PSA expanded its athletic programs to include boys and girls track and field, boys and girls cross country, boys and girls cheerleaders, and girls volleyball.

=== Boys' Basketball ===
==== Section and state record ====
Year	Class	Section	State
2012	4A	Champions	

The boys basketball team had a great season and winning the section 4A championship. To win a section is not an easy climbed and we are proud to be section and state participant this 2012 school year. The Lady Lycans basketball team also had a wonderful season with a section 4A 2nd place.

=== Girls' Basketball ===
==== Section and state record ====
Year	Class	Section	State
2012	4A	2nd Place	
