= 2026 Westchester SC season =

Westchester SC
- Owner: Mitch Baruchowitz
- Head coach: George Gjokaj
- Stadium: The Stadium at Memorial Field
- USL League One: 10th
- U.S. Open Cup: Round of 32
- USL League Cup: Group stage
- USL Cup: Group stage
- Top goalscorer: League: Conor McGlynn (16); All: Conor McGlynn (17)
- Highest home attendance: 5,145 vs New York City FC US Open Cup April 14, 2,637 vs New York Cosmos July 22
- Lowest home attendance: 1,035 vs Sarasota Paradise March 14, 100 vs New York Renegades U.S. Open Cup March 19,
- Average home league attendance: 1,733, with US Open Cup 1,832, with USL Cup 1,864, With USL Cup but not US Open Cup 1,780
- Biggest win: Westchester SC 5–1 Corpus Christi FC April 4 Westchester SC 4–0 Greenville Triumph SC June 14; Westchester SC 5–1 Portland Hearts of Pine June 19
- Biggest defeat: Athletic Club Boise 4–0 Westchester SC April 18

The 2026 Westchester SC season was the second and final season in the club's existence as well as their second in USL League One, the third-tier of American soccer. This season they were coached by a new head coach for Westchester. On November 3, the club announced that head coach Dave Carton, as well as their entire technical staff, had been dismissed. He was replaced by George Gjokaj.

== Players and staff ==
=== Current roster ===
As of August 12, 2026

Note: Flags indicate national team as defined under FIFA eligibility rules; some limited exceptions apply. Players may hold more than one non-FIFA nationality.

No.	Pos.	Nation	Player
2	DF	USA	Maximus Jennings
3	DF	ENG	Charlie Dickerson
4	DF	USA	Bobby Pierre
5	DF	UKR	Tim Timchenko
6	MF	USA	Conor McGlynn
7	FW	TTO	Samory Powder
8	MF	AUS	Daniel Bouman
9	MF	NED	Koen Blommestijn
10	MF	NED	Dean Guezen
11	MF	ESA	Bryan Vásquez
12	DF	GHA	Rashid Tetteh
13	GK	USA	Andrew Hammersley

No.	Pos.	Nation	Player
15	MF	USA	Aidan Borra
17	MF	USA	Miguel Diaz
18	FW	USA	Ermin Mačkić
19	DF	USA	Mo Williams
21	MF	USA	Aleksei Armas
22	DF	USA	Stephen Payne
23	GK	ARG	Matias Molina
27	MF	MEX	Jonathan Jimenez
40	DF	USA	Mo Williams
42	MF	USA	Piero Elias
66	DF	TTO	Noah Powder
77	FW	NOR	Daniel Burko
83	MF	USA	Kyle Evans

1. USL Academy Contract

== Transfers ==
=== In ===
Date	Position	Number	Name	from	Type	Fee	Ref.
January 14, 2026	MF	17	(United States) Miguel Diaz	(United States) Westchester Flames	Signing	NA	
January 22, 2026	FW	77	(Norway) Daniel Burko	(United States) Hofstra Pride	Signing	NA	
January 23, 2026	MF	21	(United States) Aleksei Armas	(United States) Hofstra Pride	Signing	NA	
January 24, 2026	MF	11	(United States) Aidan Borra	(United States) Sacred Heart Pioneers	Signing	NA	
January 25, 2026	DF	5	(Ukraine) Tim Timchenko	(United States) Iona Gaels	Signing	NA	
January 26, 2026	DF	2	(United States) Maximus Jennings	(United States) Real Monarchs	Signing	NA	
January 27, 2026	DF	3	(England) Charlie Dickerson	(United States) Providence Friars	Signing	NA	
January 28, 2026	MF	83	(United States) Kyle Evans	(United States) Marist Red Foxes	Signing	NA	
January 29, 2026	GK	23	(Argentina) Matias Molina	(United States) Seton Hall Pirates	Signing	NA	
February 25, 2026	DF	40	(United States) Mo Williams	(United States) Notre Dame Fighting Irish	Signing	NA	
March 6, 2026	MF	27	(Mexico) Jonathan Jiménez	(United States) Hartford Athletic	Signing	NA	
August 12, 2026	MF	42	(United States) Piero Elias	(United States) Sporting Club Jacksonville	25 Day Contract	NA	
August 19, 2026	DF	14	(United States) Jack Loura	(United States) Hartford Athletic	25 Day Contract	NA	

=== Out ===
Date	Position	Number	Name	to	Type	Fee	Ref.
December 1, 2025	MF	31	(Jamaica) Deshane Beckford	(United States) Greenville Triumph SC	Loan Expired	NA	
December 1, 2025	GK	1	(United States) Dane Jacomen	(United States) FC Tulsa	Loan Expired	NA	
December 1, 2025	MF	68	(Japan) Taimu Okiyoshi	(United States) Brooklyn FC	Loan Expired	NA	
December 1, 2025	GK	24	(Honduras) Enrique Facussé	(Honduras) Juticalpa	Loan Expired	NA	
December 1, 2025	FW	17	(United States) Jonathan Bolanos	(United States) Sarasota Paradise	Contract Expired	NA	
December 1, 2025	DF	35	(Haiti) Andrew Jean-Baptiste	NA	Contract Expired	NA	
December 1, 2025	DF	5	(Liberia) Joel Johnson	NA	Contract Expired	NA	
December 1, 2025	DF	92	(Jamaica) Kemar Lawrence	NA	Contract Expired	NA	
December 1, 2025	DF	23	(Colombia) Juan Palma	(Colombia) Boyacá Chicó	Contract Expired	NA	
December 1, 2025	FW	14	(Austria) Mink Peeters	Retired	Contract Expired	NA	
December 1, 2025	FW	15	(Liberia) Prince Saydee	(United States) Charlotte Independence	Contract Expired	NA	
December 1, 2025	MF	21	(United States) Samuel Greenberg	NA	USL Academy Contract Expired	NA	
December 1, 2025	MF	71	(United States) Christian Mancheno	(United States) FC Cincinnati Academy	USL Academy Contract Expired	NA	
December 1, 2025	GK	99	(Costa Rica) Jose Millman	NA	USL Academy Contract Expired	NA	
December 19, 2025	DF	64	(United States) Braeden Backus	(United States) New York Cosmos	Free Agent	Free	
January 16, 2026	FW	29	(Honduras) Juan Carlos Obregon	(United States) Brooklyn FC	Transfer	NA	
April 16, 2026	DF	19	(United States) Josh Drack	(United States) Portland Hearts of Pine	Transfer	Undisclosed	
July 5, 2026	FW	47	(United States) Colin Veltri	NA	Contract Expired	NA	
July 13, 2026	DF	12	(Ghana) Rashid Tetteh	(United States) Carolina Core FC	Transfer	Undisclosed	

== Non-competitive fixtures ==
=== Friendlies ===
February 4	New York Red Bulls II	0–3	Westchester SC
			Kyle Evans; Burko

February 14	Brooklyn FC	v	Westchester SC

== Competitive fixtures ==
=== USL League One ===
==== Table ====
Pos	Team	Pld	W	L	T	GF	GA	GD	Pts	Qualification
8	FC Naples	32	14	14	4	39	46	−7	46	Playoffs
9	Fort Wayne FC	32	12	11	9	47	42	+5	45	
10	Westchester SC	32	11	14	7	55	51	+4	40	
11	Sarasota Paradise	32	11	14	7	49	51	−2	40	
12	Corpus Christi FC	32	9	13	10	36	51	−15	37	

Source: USL League One
Rules for classification: 1) points; 2) total wins; 3) total goal differential; 4) total goals scored; 5) points earned against top four finishers; 6) disciplinary points; 7) drawing of lots.

March 7 1	Westchester SC	2–3	One Knoxville SC	Mount Vernon, New York
7:00 PM EDT	Dickerson (yellow card) 7'; McGlynn 19' (pen.); Jennings (yellow card) 45+2'; Mackic (yellow card) 90'; Evans 90+3'	Report	Krioutchenkov 12', 22'; Gøling (yellow card) 27'; Murphy 45+2'	Stadium: The Stadium at Memorial Field; Attendance: 1,722; Referee: Servando Berna Rico

March 14 2	Westchester SC	1–1	Charlotte Independence	Mount Vernon, New York
7:00 PM EDT	Guezen 1'; Burko (yellow card) 32'; Drack (yellow card) 90+1'	Report	Romero (yellow card) 41'; Álvarez (yellow card) 45+2'; Manin (yellow card) 63'; Riascos (yellow card) 90+5'; Ortiz 90+7'	Stadium: The Stadium at Memorial Field; Attendance: 1,120; Referee: Deny Kulasinac

March 29 3	Greenville Triumph SC	4–2	Westchester SC	Greenville, South Carolina
7:00 PM EDT	Liadi 22', 59'; Robles 33' (yellow card) 90+1'; Beckford 41'	Report	Guezen (yellow card) 35'; Armas (yellow card) 51'; Mackic 63'; Jennings (yellow card) 64'; McGlynn 68'; Evans (yellow card) 80'; Pierre (yellow card) 90+2'	Stadium: Eugene E. Stone III Stadium; Attendance: 1,698; Referee: Mario Maric

April 4 4	Westchester SC	5–1	Corpus Christi FC	Mount Vernon, New York
7:00 PM EDT	McGlynn 16' (pen.), 65'; Jiménez 18'; Jennings (yellow card) 34'; Dickerson (yellow card) 60'; Mackic 77'; Guezen 81'	Report	Gomez (yellow card) 32'; Kwakwa 45+5'; Pondeca (yellow card) 84'; Keaney (red card) 90+3'	Stadium: The Stadium at Memorial Field; Attendance: 1,326; Referee: Luis Arroyo

April 8 5	Westchester SC	2–0	Sarasota Paradise	Mount Vernon, New York
7:00 PM EDT	Guezen 53', 66'; Jennings (yellow card) 61' (yellow-red card) 61'	Report	Stretch (yellow card) 70'	Stadium: The Stadium at Memorial Field; Attendance: 1,035; Referee: Rodrigo Albuquerque

April 18 6	Athletic Club Boise	4–0	Westchester SC	Garden City, Idaho
9:00 PM EDT	Moshobane 16'; Kostyshyn 21', 54'; Miller (yellow card) 52'; Brito 69'; Dengler (yellow card) 76'	Report	Timchenko (yellow card) 26'; Mackic (yellow card) 34'; Blommestijn (yellow card) 76'	Stadium: Stadium at Expo Idaho; Attendance: 7,204; Referee: Servando Berna Rico

May 1 7	Richmond Kickers	1–0	Westchester SC	Richmond, Virginia
7:00 PM EDT	Kirkland 14'; Layton (yellow card) 35'; O'Malley (yellow card) 37'; Sasankhah (yellow card) 45+3'; Anderson (yellow card) 51'; Pannholzer (yellow card) 57'; Seufert (yellow card) 83'; Fillion (yellow card) 90+4'	Report	Jennings (yellow card) 59'; Powder (yellow card) 61'; Burko (yellow card) 76'	Stadium: City Stadium; Attendance: 4,609; Referee: Igor Bych

May 9 8	Fort Wayne FC	1–0	Westchester SC	Fort Wayne, Indiana
7:30 PM EDT	Healy 35' (yellow card) 67'; Oyetunde (yellow card) 36'; Garay (yellow card) 52'	Report	Jennings (yellow card) 53'; Bouman (yellow card) 79'	Stadium: Fort Wayne FC Park; Attendance: 2,872; Referee: Stefan Perri

May 23 9	FC Naples	1–0	Westchester SC	Naples, Florida
7:30 PM EDT	Torrellas (yellow card) 33'; Arevalo 45'; Yoder (yellow card) 47'	Report	Blommestijn (yellow card) 52'; Marinelli (yellow card) 66'; Bachstein (yellow card) 66'; Powder (yellow card) 77'; Jiménez (yellow card) 81'	Stadium: Paradise Coast Sports Complex; Attendance: 2,029; Referee: Benjamin Meyer

May 30 10	Westchester SC	v	South Georgia Tormenta FC	Mount Vernon, New York
7:00 PM EDT				Stadium: The Stadium at Memorial Field
Note: Game cancelled following South Georgia Tormenta FC's withdrawal from USL League One.

June 10 11	Westchester SC	1–1	Fort Wayne FC	Mount Vernon, New York
7:00 PM EDT	McGlynn 28'; Pierre (yellow card) 78'; Gjokaj (yellow card) 83'; Jennings (yellow card) 85'	Report	Dias (yellow card) 45'; Healy 74'; Jordan (yellow card) 84'; Gafar (yellow card) 87'	Stadium: The Stadium at Memorial Field; Attendance: 1,271; Referee: Drew Klemp

June 14 12	Westchester SC	4–0	Greenville Triumph SC	Mount Vernon, New York
7:00 PM EDT	Diaz 15'; Jennings 32'; Evans (yellow card) 42'; McGlynn 45+5' (pen.); Armas (yellow card) 74'; Burko 90+2'	Report	Knight (red card) 45+1'; Fricke (yellow card) 57'	Stadium: The Stadium at Memorial Field; Attendance: 1,613; Referee: Joshua Encarnación

June 19 13	Westchester SC	5–1	Portland Hearts of Pine	Mount Vernon, New York
7:00 PM EDT	McGlynn 27', 45+2'; Jiménez 54', 88' (yellow card) 82'; Evans (yellow card) 62'; Diaz 72'	Report	Barbosa (yellow card) 87'; Camara 90+3'	Stadium: The Stadium at Memorial Field; Attendance: 2,350; Referee: Walterson Torchon

June 24 14	Spokane Velocity	2–1	Westchester SC	Spokane, Washington
9:00 PM EDT	Lewis 38'; Veidman (yellow card) 45+5'; Gil 54'; Fernandez (yellow card) 56'	Report	Diaz 4'	Stadium: One Spokane Stadium; Attendance: 1,925; Referee: Muhammad Hassan

July 1 15	Chattanooga Red Wolves SC	2–0	Westchester SC	East Ridge, Tennessee
7:00 PM EDT	Kinzner (yellow card) 41'; Timchenko 54' (o.g.); Hernandez 65'; Ayimbila (yellow card) 84'; Ramos (yellow card) 90'	Report	Powder (yellow card) 52'; Pierre (yellow card) 63'	Stadium: CHI Memorial Stadium; Attendance: 1,014; Referee: Alexandra Billeter

July 5 16	Westchester SC	0–1	Athletic Club Boise	Mount Vernon, New York
7:00 PM EDT	Armas (yellow card) 26'; Evans (yellow card) 54'; Jennings (yellow card) 86'; Pierre (yellow card) 89'	Report	Gasso (yellow card) 14'; Pierre 62' (o.g.); Hanson (yellow card) 78'	Stadium: The Stadium at Memorial Field; Attendance: 1,776; Referee: Stephen Foster

July 18 17	Union Omaha	2–2	Westchester SC	Omaha, Nebraska
8:00 PM EDT	Ors 9', 80'; Faz (yellow card) 63'; Guediri (yellow card) 82'	Report	Pierre (yellow card) 29'; Bouman 34' (yellow card) 65'; Guezen 52'; McGlynn (yellow card) 56'; Burko (yellow card) 73'; Marinelli (yellow card) 90+4'	Stadium: Morrison Stadium; Attendance: 2,275; Referee: Emmy Nonso-Ayakwo

July 22 18	Westchester SC	3–0	New York Cosmos	Mount Vernon, New York
7:00 PM EDT	Pierre 7'; Timchenko (yellow card) 67'; Evans 76'; McGlynn 83'	Report	Cabrera (yellow card) 29'; Chavez (yellow card) 85'	Stadium: The Stadium at Memorial Field; Attendance: 2,637; Referee: Nicholas Strednak

July 25 19	AV Alta FC	0–0	Westchester SC	Lancaster, California
11:00 PM EDT	Pehlivanov (yellow card) 84'; C. Ortiz (yellow card) 85'	Report	Timchenko (yellow card) 31'; Powder (yellow card) 82'; Pierre (yellow card) 83'	Stadium: Lancaster Municipal Stadium; Attendance: 3,436; Referee: Anthony Sobolevsky

August 1 20	Forward Madison FC	2–0	Westchester SC	Madison, Wisconsin
8:00 PM EDT	Karamoko 32'; Carmichael (yellow card) 47'; McCamy (yellow card) 52'; Torres (yellow card) 55'; Edwards (yellow card) 73'; Annor 86'	Report	Pierre (yellow card) 8' (yellow-red card) 19'	Stadium: Breese Stevens Field; Attendance: 3,488; Referee: Esad Omanovic

August 8 21	South Georgia Tormenta FC	v	Westchester SC	Statesboro, Georgia
7:30 PM EDT				Stadium: Tormenta Stadium
Note: Game cancelled following South Georgia Tormenta FC's withdrawal from USL League One.

August 15 22	Westchester SC	3–2	FC Naples	Mount Vernon, New York
7:00 PM EDT	Elias (yellow card) 10' (goal) 37'; McGlynn 29'; Jiménez 35' (yellow card) 83'; Guezen (yellow card) 71'	Report	Ferrín 48' (pen.); Ciss (yellow card) 72'; Likulia 78'	Stadium: The Stadium at Memorial Field; Attendance: 1,860; Referee: Edson Carvajal

August 22 23	Corpus Christi FC	2–2	Westchester SC	Corpus Christi, Texas
8:30 PM EDT	Kwakwa (yellow card) 21'; Medina (yellow card) 22'; Talbot (yellow card) 22'; Keegan 57'; Zayed (yellow card) 82' (yellow-red card) 90'; Keaney 89'	Report	Timchenko 23'; Elias (yellow card) 26'; Guezen 37'; Bouman (yellow card) 79'	Stadium: Cabaniss Athletic Complex; Attendance: 2,360; Referee: Anthony Almeida

August 29 24	Westchester SC	1–3	Spokane Velocity	Mount Vernon, New York
7:00 PM EDT	Guezen 14'; Bouman (yellow card) 49'; Diaz (yellow card) 90+5'	Report	Brett 17' (pen.); Waldeck (yellow card) 29'; John-Brown 44'; Lewis 72'	Stadium: The Stadium at Memorial Field; Attendance: 1,730; Referee: Stephen Foster

September 2 25	Westchester SC	0–1	Chattanooga Red Wolves SC	Mount Vernon, New York
7:00 PM EDT	Jennings (yellow card) 15'; Pierre (yellow card) 49'; Timchenko (yellow card) 60'; Bouman (yellow card) 68'	Report	Clapier (yellow card) 22'; Kelly (yellow card) 25'; Hernandez 35'; Kinzner (yellow card) 90+6'	Stadium: The Stadium at Memorial Field; Attendance: 1,730; Referee: Jordan Gray

September 6 26	Portland Hearts of Pine	2–1	Westchester SC	Portland, Maine
6:00 PM EDT	Gonzalez 11' (pen.); Poon-Angeron (yellow card) 45'; Evans (yellow card) 77'; Camara 82'	Report	Dickerson 66' (yellow card) 81'; Guezen (yellow card) 77'; Jennings (yellow card) 79'	Stadium: Fitzpatrick Stadium; Attendance: 6,224; Referee: Igor Bych

September 12 27	Charlotte Independence	5–4	Westchester SC	Charlotte, North Carolina
7:00 PM EDT	Skinner 31', 38'; Ortiz 32'; Manzinga 45' (yellow card) 70'; Romero (yellow card) 45+3'; Manin (yellow card) 60'; Jaime 90+1'	Report	McGlynn 19' (pen.); Loura 27'; Bouman (yellow card) 53'; Blommestijn 68', 77' (yellow card) 72'; Mackic (yellow card) 79'; Diaz (yellow card) 90+2'	Stadium: American Legion Memorial Stadium; Attendance: 656; Referee: Steven Cardozo

September 16 28	Westchester SC	5–2	Richmond Kickers	Mount Vernon, New York
7:00 PM EDT	Timchenko 14'; McGlynn 16', 34' (pen.); Jiménez 37', 39'; Loura (yellow card) 78'	Report	Seufert (yellow card) 45+1' (goal) 48'; Pannholzer 51'; Murana (yellow card) 72'; Vazquez (yellow card) 77'; Bolduc (yellow card) 90+2'	Stadium: The Stadium at Memorial Field; Attendance: 1,365; Referee: William Hale

September 19 29	New York Cosmos	1–2	Westchester SC	Paterson, New Jersey
5:00 PM EDT	Chavez (yellow card) 10'; Spengler 82'; Koffi (yellow card) 85'	Report	Blommestijn 45+2'; McGlynn 90+8' (yellow card) 90+9'	Stadium: Hinchliffe Stadium; Attendance: 1,310; Referee: John Griggs

September 27 30	One Knoxville SC	0–0	Westchester SC	Knoxville, Tennessee
3:00 PM EDT	Gøling (yellow card) 71'; Skelton (yellow card) 90+8'	Report	Loura (yellow card) 90+5'; Blommestijn (yellow card) 90+8'	Stadium: Covenant Health Park; Attendance: 4,363; Referee: John Matto

October 3 31	Westchester SC	2–1	AV Alta FC	Mount Vernon, New York
7:00 PM EDT	Burko 20'; McGlynn 34' (pen.); Dickerson (yellow card) 60'; Loura (yellow card) 64'; Mackic (yellow card) 86'; Blommestijn (yellow card) 90+1'; Powder (yellow card) 90+1'	Report	Aoumaich (yellow card) 22'; Kleiban (yellow card) 78'; Lay 90+6'	Stadium: The Stadium at Memorial Field; Attendance: 1,942; Referee: Danielle Chesky

October 10 32	Westchester SC	3–2	Forward Madison FC	Mount Vernon, New York
7:00 PM EDT	Blommestijn 13', 45+3' (yellow card) 64'; Elias 72'	Report	Kanyane (yellow card) 23'; Toure (yellow card) 24'; Bolma 55'; Humphrey (yellow card) 83'; Edwards (yellow card) 85'; Karamoko 90+6'	Stadium: The Stadium at Memorial Field; Attendance: 2,056; Referee: Joe Surgan

October 17 33	Westchester SC	2–1	Union Omaha	Mount Vernon, New York
7:00 PM EDT	Blommestijn 30' (yellow card) 69'; McGlynn 44'; Jennings (yellow card) 83'; Loura (yellow card) 90+4'	Report	Ors 4' (yellow card) 64'; Tekiela (yellow card) 74'; Candela (yellow card) 82'; Cabral (yellow card) 90+1'	Stadium: The Stadium at Memorial Field; Attendance: 2,190; Referee: Braeden Frey

October 24 34	Sarasota Paradise	2–2	Westchester SC	Lakewood Ranch, Florida
7:30 PM EDT	Bolanos 61'; Terzaghi 67' (yellow card) 90+3'; McLaughlin (yellow card) 76'; Sanchez (yellow card) 86'	Report	Bouman (yellow card) 12'; Jiménez 83'; Armas (yellow card) 90+3'; Burko 90+7'; Powder (yellow card) 90+8'	Stadium: Premier Sports Campus; Attendance: 1,700; Referee: Atahan Yaya

=== Lamar Hunt US Open Cup ===
March 19 First Round	Westchester SC	2–0	NY Renegades FC	Mount Vernon, New York
7:30 PM ET	Burko 34' (pen.), 83'; Guezen (yellow card) 53'; Powder (yellow card) 90+1'	Report	Carriel (yellow card) 67'	Stadium: The Stadium at Memorial Field; Attendance: 100; Referee: Leonel Brito

April 1 Second Round	Vermont Green FC	0–0 (a.e.t.) (3–4 p)	Westchester SC	Burlington, Vermont
7:00 PM ET	Nikolai (yellow card) 74'; Clarke-Tosczak (yellow card) 90+1'	Report	Dickerson (yellow card) 45+1'; Evans (yellow card) 69'	Stadium: Virtue Field; Attendance: 2,600; Referee: Thomas Snyder
	Penalties
	Millar (penalty missed); Hall (penalty scored); Akulov (penalty scored); Moloney (penalty scored); Baker (penalty missed); Miller (penalty missed)		(penalty scored) Conor McGlynn; (penalty missed) Armas; (penalty scored) Burko; (penalty missed) Blommestijn; (penalty scored) Mackic; (penalty scored) Vásquez

April 14 Round of 32	Westchester SC	2–5	New York City FC	Mount Vernon, New York
7:30 PM ET	Burko 22'; McGlynn (yellow card) 61'; Evans 73'	Report	Ojeda 13'; Magno 25' (pen.), 36', 70'; Farnós 41'; Trewin 64'; Jones (yellow card) 86'; Reid (yellow card) 86'	Stadium: The Stadium at Memorial Field; Attendance: 5,145; Referee: Muhammad Hassan

=== USL Cup ===
April 25 Group Stage	Westchester SC	2–2 (5–4 p)	Portland Hearts of Pine	Mount Vernon, New York
7:00 PM EDT	McGlynn 24' (pen.); Dickerson (yellow card) 44'; Burko 50'	Report	Espinosa 7' (yellow card) 28'; Terzaghi (yellow card) 49'; Washington (yellow card) 65'; Kidd (yellow card) 65'; Lopez (yellow card) 70'; Wright 84' (yellow card) 90'	Stadium: The Stadium at Memorial Field; Attendance: 1,056; Referee: Amin Hadzic
	Penalties
	Guezen (penalty scored); Burko (penalty scored); Blommestijn (penalty scored); Jiménez (penalty missed); Bouman (penalty scored); Armas (penalty scored)		(penalty scored) Wright; (penalty missed) Huck; (penalty scored) Kamara; (penalty scored) Georgallides; (penalty scored) Green; (penalty missed) Evans

May 15 Group Stage	Westchester SC	2–3	New York Cosmos	Mount Vernon, New York
7:00 PM EDT	Armas (yellow card) 36'; Blommestijn 47'; Mackic 69'; Jiménez (yellow card) 85'; Bouman (yellow card) 89'	Report	Mendonca (yellow card) 35' (goal) 81'; Guenzatti 43'; Bohui (yellow card) 85'; Koffi 90+4'	Stadium: The Stadium at Memorial Field; Attendance: 3,257; Referee: Dorian Del Toro

June 6 Group Stage	Rhode Island FC	3–0	Westchester SC	Pawtucket, Rhode Island
7:30 PM EDT	Holstad 41'; Williams 44'; Afonso 75'	Report		Stadium: Centreville Bank Stadium; Attendance: 10,554; Referee: Deny Kulasinac

July 11 Group Stage	Hartford Athletic	2–1	Westchester SC	Hartford, Connecticut
7:00 PM EDT	Coffey 14' (yellow card) 76' (yellow-red card) 86'; Fischer (yellow card) 24'; Diz (yellow card) 34'; Williams 41'	Report	Jennings 45+2'; Pierre (yellow card) 90+1'	Stadium: Trinity Health Stadium; Attendance: 1,639; Referee: Alyssa Pennington

=== Appearances and goals ===
No.	Pos	Nat	Player	Total		USL League One		Lamar Hunt US Open Cup		USL Cup		USL League One Playoffs	
No.	Pos	Nat	Player	Apps	Goals	Apps	Goals	Apps	Goals	Apps	Goals	Apps	Goals
1	GK	(United States) USA	Andrew Hammersley	10	0	6+0	0	2+0	0	2+0	0	0+0	0
2	DF	(United States) USA	Maximus Jennings	37	2	29+1	1	3+0	0	4+0	1	0+0	0
3	DF	(England) ENG	Charlie Dickerson	30	1	19+6	1	2+1	0	2+0	0	0+0	0
4	DF	(United States) USA	Kurowskybob Pierre	26	1	16+3	1	2+1	0	3+1	0	0+0	0
5	DF	(Russia) RUS	Tim Timchenko	31	2	25+3	2	1+0	0	2+0	0	0+0	0
6	MF	(United States) USA	Conor McGlynn	39	17	32+0	16	3+0	0	3+1	1	0+0	0
7	MF	(Trinidad and Tobago) TTO	Samory Powder	28	0	3+18	0	1+2	0	1+3	0	0+0	0
8	MF	(Australia) AUS	Daniel Bouman	35	1	21+7	1	2+1	0	3+1	0	0+0	0
9	MF	(Netherlands) NED	Koen Blommestijn	28	7	11+12	6	0+3	0	1+1	1	0+0	0
10	MF	(Netherlands) NED	Dean Guezen	32	7	19+6	7	3+0	0	2+2	0	0+0	0
11	MF	(El Salvador) ESA	Bryan Vásquez	8	0	0+6	0	0+1	0	1+0	0	0+0	0
11	MF	(United States) USA	Aidan Borra	2	0	0+1	0	0+0	0	0+1	0	0+0	0
12	DF	(Ghana) GHA	Rashid Tetteh	2	0	0+1	0	0+0	0	0+1	0	0+0	0
14	DF	(United States) USA	Jack Loura	12	1	10+2	1	0+0	0	0+0	0	0+0	0
15	MF	(United States) USA	Aidan Borra	5	0	0+4	0	0+0	0	1+0	0	0+0	0
17	FW	(United States) USA	Miguel Diaz	24	3	9+12	3	0+0	0	2+1	0	0+0	0
18	FW	(United States) USA	Ermin Mackic	34	3	12+16	2	0+3	0	2+1	1	0+0	0
19	DF	(United States) USA	Josh Drack	4	0	0+3	0	0+1	0	0+0	0	0+0	0
20	DF	(United States) USA	Marko Vislocky	2	0	0+2	0	0+0	0	0+0	0	0+0	0
21	MF	(United States) USA	Aleksei Armas	34	0	21+6	0	3+0	0	3+1	0	0+0	0
22	DF	(United States) USA	Stephen Payne	2	0	1+1	0	0+0	0	0+0	0	0+0	0
23	GK	(Argentina) ARG	Matias Molina	3	0	2+0	0	1+0	0	0+0	0	0+0	0
24	MF	(United States) USA	Piero Elias	6	2	3+3	2	0+0	0	0+0	0	0+0	0
27	MF	(Mexico) MEX	Jonathan Jiménez	36	7	23+7	7	2+1	0	2+1	0	0+0	0
40	DF	(United States) USA	Mo Williams	8	0	2+5	0	0+0	0	0+1	0	0+0	0
47	FW	(United States) USA	Colin Veltri	1	0	0+1	0	0+0	0	0+0	0	0+0	0
66	DF	(Trinidad and Tobago) TTO	Noah Powder	26	0	14+8	0	2+0	0	2+0	0	0+0	0
77	MF	(Norway) NOR	Daniel Burko	36	7	19+10	3	3+0	3	2+2	1	0+0	0
83	MF	(United States) USA	Kyle Evans	37	3	29+1	2	3+0	1	4+0	0	0+0	0
99	GK	(United States) USA	Luca Marinelli	25	0	23+0	0	0+0	0	2+0	0	0+0	0

=== Top Goalscorers ===
Rank	Position	Number	Name	USL1 Season	U.S. Open Cup	USL Cup	USL League One Playoffs	Total
1	MF	6	(United States) Conor McGlynn	16	0	1	0	17
2	MF	10	(Netherlands) Dean Guezen	7	0	0	0	7
2	DF	27	(Mexico) Jonathan Jiménez	7	0	0	0	7
2	MF	9	(Netherlands) Koen Blommestijn	6	0	1	0	7
2	FW	77	(Norway) Daniel Burko	3	3	1	0	7
6	FW	17	(United States) Miguel Diaz	3	0	0	0	3
6	MF	83	(United States) Kyle Evans	2	1	0	0	3
6	FW	18	(United States) Ermin Mackic	2	0	1	0	3
9	DF	5	(Russia) Tim Timchenko	2	0	0	0	2
9	MF	42	(United States) Piero Elias	2	0	0	0	2
9	DF	2	(United States) Maximus Jennings	1	0	1	0	2
12	DF	3	(England) Charlie Dickerson	1	0	0	0	1
12	MF	4	(United States) Bobby Pierre	1	0	0	0	1
12	MF	8	(Australia) Daniel Bouman	1	0	0	0	1
12	DF	14	(United States) Jack Loura	1	0	0	0	1
Total				55	4	5	0	64

=== Assist scorers ===
Rank	Position	Number	Name	USL1 Season	U.S. Open Cup	USL Cup	USL League One Playoffs	Total
1	MF	83	(United States) Kyle Evans	8	0	1	0	9
2	FW	77	(Norway) Daniel Burko	6	0	1	0	7
3	DF	2	(United States) Maximus Jennings	4	0	0	0	4
3	MF	10	(Netherlands) Dean Guezen	4	0	0	0	4
3	DF	27	(Mexico) Jonathan Jiménez	3	0	1	0	4
3	MF	21	(United States) Aleksei Armas	2	1	1	0	4
7	DF	5	(Russia) Tim Timchenko	3	0	0	0	3
8	FW	18	(United States) Ermin Mackic	2	0	0	0	2
8	MF	66	(Trinidad and Tobago) Noah Powder	2	0	0	0	2
10	DF	3	(England) Charlie Dickerson	1	0	0	0	1
10	MF	8	(Australia) Daniel Bouman	1	0	0	0	1
10	FW	11	(El Salvador) Bryan Vásquez	1	0	0	0	1
10	DF	40	(United States) Maurice Williams	1	0	0	0	1
10	MF	42	(United States) Piero Elias	1	0	0	0	1
10	MF	6	(United States) Conor McGlynn	0	1	0	0	1
Total				39	2	4	0	45

=== Clean sheets ===
Rank	Name	USL1 Season	U.S. Open Cup	USL Cup	USL1 Playoffs	Total
1	(United States) Luca Marinelli	3	0	0	0	3
2	(United States) Andrew Hammersley	1	1	0	0	2
3	(Argentina) Matias Molina	0	1	0	0	1

=== Disciplinary record ===
No.	Pos.	Player	USL League One Regular Season			Lamar Hunt US Open Cup			USL Cup			USL League One Playoffs			Total		
No.	Pos.	Player	Yellow card	(yellow card) (yellow-red card)	Red card	Yellow card	(yellow card) (yellow-red card)	Red card	Yellow card	(yellow card) (yellow-red card)	Red card	Yellow card	(yellow card) (yellow-red card)	Red card	Yellow card	(yellow card) (yellow-red card)	Red card
1	GK	(United States) Andrew Hammersley	0	0	0	0	0	0	0	0	0	0	0	0	0	0	0
2	DF	(United States) Maximus Jennings	10	1	0	0	0	0	0	0	0	0	0	0	10	1	0
3	DF	(England) Charlie Dickerson	4	0	0	1	0	0	1	0	0	0	0	0	6	0	0
4	DF	(United States) Kurowskybob Pierre	7	1	0	0	0	0	1	0	0	0	0	0	8	1	0
5	DF	(Russia) Tim Timchenko	4	0	0	0	0	0	0	0	0	0	0	0	4	0	0
6	MF	(United States) Conor McGlynn	2	0	0	1	0	0	0	0	0	0	0	0	3	0	0
7	MF	(Trinidad and Tobago) Samory Powder	2	0	0	0	0	0	0	0	0	0	0	0	2	0	0
8	MF	(Australia) Daniel Bouman	7	0	0	0	0	0	1	0	0	0	0	0	8	0	0
9	MF	(Netherlands) Koen Blommestijn	7	0	0	0	0	0	0	0	0	0	0	0	7	0	0
10	MF	(Netherlands) Dean Guezen	3	0	0	1	0	0	0	0	0	0	0	0	4	0	0
11	MF	(El Salvador) Bryan Vásquez	0	0	0	0	0	0	0	0	0	0	0	0	0	0	0
12	DF	(Ghana) Rashid Tetteh	0	0	0	0	0	0	0	0	0	0	0	0	0	0	0
14	DF	(United States) Jack Loura	3	0	0	0	0	0	0	0	0	0	0	0	3	0	0
15	MF	(United States) Aidan Borra	0	0	0	0	0	0	0	0	0	0	0	0	0	0	0
17	FW	(United States) Miguel Diaz	2	0	0	0	0	0	0	0	0	0	0	0	2	0	0
18	FW	(United States) Ermin Mackic	4	0	0	0	0	0	0	0	0	0	0	0	4	0	0
19	DF	(United States) Josh Drack	1	0	0	0	0	0	0	0	0	0	0	0	1	0	0
21	MF	(United States) Aleksei Armas	4	0	0	0	0	0	1	0	0	0	0	0	5	0	0
22	DF	(United States) Stephen Payne	0	0	0	0	0	0	0	0	0	0	0	0	0	0	0
23	GK	(Argentina) Matias Molina	0	0	0	0	0	0	0	0	0	0	0	0	0	0	0
27	FW	(Mexico) Jonathan Jiménez	3	0	0	0	0	0	1	0	0	0	0	0	4	0	0
40	DF	(United States) Mo Williams	0	0	0	0	0	0	0	0	0	0	0	0	0	0	0
42	MF	(United States) Piero Elias	2	0	0	0	0	0	0	0	0	0	0	0	2	0	0
66	DF	(Trinidad and Tobago) Noah Powder	4	0	0	1	0	0	0	0	0	0	0	0	5	0	0
77	FW	(Norway) Daniel Burko	3	0	0	0	0	0	0	0	0	0	0	0	3	0	0
83	MF	(United States) Kyle Evans	4	0	0	1	0	0	0	0	0	0	0	0	5	0	0
99	GK	(United States) Luca Marinelli	2	0	0	0	0	0	0	0	0	0	0	0	2	0	0
	Head Coach	(United States) George Gjokaj	1	0	0	0	0	0	0	0	0	0	0	0	1	0	0
Total			79	2	0	5	0	0	5	0	0	0	0	0	89	2	0

== Awards and Honors ==
=== USL League One Annual Awards ===
==== USL League One All League Honorees ====
Player	Team	Position	Ref
(United States) Conor McGlynn	First Team	MF	

=== USL League One Monthly Awards ===
==== USL League One Player of the Month ====
Month	Player	Position	Ref
October	(Norway) Daniel Burko	FW	

=== USL League One Weekly Awards ===
==== USL League One Team of the Week ====
Week	Player	Opponent	Position	Ref
1	(United States) Kyle Evans	One Knoxville SC	Bench	
2	(Trinidad and Tobago) Noah Powder	Charlotte Independence	DF	
5	(Trinidad and Tobago) Noah Powder	Corpus Christi FC	DF	
5	(United States) Conor McGlynn	Corpus Christi FC	MF	
5	(Mexico) Jonathan Jiménez	Corpus Christi FC	MF	
5	(United States) George Gjokaj	Corpus Christi FC	Coach	
6	(Netherlands) Dean Guezen	Sarasota Paradise	MF	
6	(United States) Andrew Hammersley	Sarasota Paradise	Bench	
6	(Russia) Tim Timchenko	Sarasota Paradise	Bench	
14/15	(Mexico) Jonathan Jiménez	Greenville Triumph SC	DF	
16	(Mexico) Jonathan Jiménez	Portland Hearts of Pine	MF	
16	(United States) Conor McGlynn	Portland Hearts of Pine	MF	
16	(United States) Maximus Jennings	Portland Hearts of Pine	Bench	
19/20	(United States) Kyle Evans	Union Omaha	MF	
21	(United States) Luca Marinelli	New York Cosmos and AV Alta FC	GK	
21	(United States) Kyle Evans	New York Cosmos and AV Alta FC	MF	
21	(United States) Bobby Pierre	New York Cosmos and AV Alta FC	Bench	
21	(United States) Conor McGlynn	New York Cosmos and AV Alta FC	Bench	
24	(Russia) Tim Timchenko	FC Naples	DF	
24	(United States) Conor McGlynn	FC Naples	MF	
24	(United States) Kyle Evans	FC Naples	Bench	
24	(Mexico) Jonathan Jiménez	FC Naples	Bench	
25	(United States) Piero Elias	Corpus Christi FC	Bench	
27	(England) Charlie Dickerson	Portland Hearts of Pine	DF	
28	(Netherlands) Koen Blommestijn	Charlotte Independence	FW	
29	(United States) Conor McGlynn	Richmond Kickers and New York Cosmos	MF	
29	(Netherlands) Dean Guezen	Richmond Kickers and New York Cosmos	FW	
29	(United States) George Gjokaj	Richmond Kickers and New York Cosmos	Coach	
29	(Mexico) Jonathan Jiménez	Richmond Kickers and New York Cosmos	Bench	
31	(United States) Jack Loura	AV Alta FC	DF	
31	(Norway) Daniel Burko	AV Alta FC	DF	
32	(United States) Kyle Evans	Forward Madison FC	MF	
32	(Netherlands) Koen Blommestijn	Forward Madison FC	FW	
33	(Norway) Daniel Burko	Union Omaha	DF	
33	(United States) George Gjokaj	Union Omaha	Head Coach	
34	(Norway) Daniel Burko	Sarasota Paradise	MF	

=== USL League One Player of the Week ===
Week	Player	Opponent	Position	Ref
6	(Netherlands) Dean Guezen	Sarasota Paradise	MF	
16	(Mexico) Jonathan Jiménez	Greenville Triumph SC	MF	
29	(United States) Conor McGlynn	Richmond Kickers and New York Cosmos	MF	

=== USL League One Save of the Week ===
Week	Player	Opponent	Ref
6	(United States) Andrew Hammersley	Sarasota Paradise	
