= 2026 USL League One season =

USL League One
- Season: 2026
- Dates: March 7 — October 24 (regular season); October 30 — November 14 (playoffs)
- Champions: Charlotte Independence (1st title)
- Players' Shield: Charlotte Independence (1st title)
- Matches: 272
- Goals: 814 (2.99 per match)
- Top goalscorer: (Cameroon) Souaibou Marou, Charlotte Independence (18 Goals)
- Biggest home win: Sarasota Paradise 6–0 Greenville Triumph (September 19) League Record
- Biggest away win: FC Naples 1–5 Charlotte Independence (June 3); Spokane Velocity 0–4 One Knoxville SC (June 20)
- Highest scoring: Charlotte Independence 5–4 Westchester SC (September 12)
- Longest winning run: 8 games Charlotte Independence (May 6 — July 1)
- Longest unbeaten run: 11 games Fort Wayne FC (April 11 — July 4)
- Longest winless run: 10 games Corpus Christi FC (March 7 — May 29); Richmond Kickers (May 27 — July 25)
- Longest losing run: 7 games New York Cosmos (May 2 — July 4); FC Naples (May 30 — July 25); AV Alta FC (August 15 — October 3)
- Highest attendance: 7,254; Athletic Club Boise 1–0 Union Omaha (June 20)
- Lowest attendance: 268; Corpus Christi FC 1–3 Portland Hearts of Pine (June 3)
- Total attendance: 818,257
- Average attendance: 3,008
- All statistics correct as of October 25, 2026.

The 2026 USL League One season was the eighth season of USL League One, and 30th season overall, of a professional men's soccer league in the third tier of the United States league system.

Seventeen teams were participating in the 2026 season, playing 32 league games each. Five teams, Athletic Club Boise, Corpus Christi FC, Fort Wayne FC, New York Cosmos, and Sarasota Paradise, joined as expansion franchises. Texoma FC self-demoted to USL League Two after one season in League One, and Tormenta FC chose not to field a team for the 2026 season.

The regular season started on March 7. The 2026 season also includes the in-season tournament, the USL Cup. It features a group stage and knockout round between all 43 teams in the two professional USL leagues, the USL Championship and the USL League One.

One Knoxville are the defending league champions and Player's Shield winners.

== Teams ==
Locations of teams for the 2026 USL League One season

Team	City	Stadium	Capacity	Head coach	Jersey manufacturer	Jersey sponsor
Athletic Club Boise	Garden City, Idaho	Stadium at Expo Idaho (Note: Soccer-specific stadium)	6,225	(United States) Nate Miller	Hummel	Saint Alphonsus
AV Alta FC	Lancaster, California	Lancaster Municipal Stadium	5,300	(United States) Brian Kleiban	Hummel	Parris Law Firm
Charlotte Independence	Charlotte, North Carolina	American Legion Memorial Stadium	10,500	(United States) Mike Jeffries	Capelli Sport	Novant Health
Chattanooga Red Wolves SC	East Ridge, Tennessee	CHI Memorial Stadium	2,500	(England) Scott Mackenzie	Adidas	Transcard
Corpus Christi FC	Corpus Christi, Texas	Corpus Christi Sports Complex	5,000	(Libya) Éamon Zayed	Capelli Sport	TBA
Fort Wayne FC	Fort Wayne, Indiana	Ruoff Mortgage Stadium	9,200	(United States) Mike Avery	Capelli Sport	PSM X ONE
Forward Madison FC	Madison, Wisconsin	Breese Stevens Field	5,000	(United States) Matt Glaeser	Hummel	Dairyland Insurance
Greenville Triumph SC	Greenville, South Carolina	GE Vernova Park (Note: Home fixtures split between Stone Stadium and Riggs Field before the opening of GE Vernova Park on June 3rd.)	6,300	(United States) Joel Tyson (interim)	Hummel	Prisma Health
FC Naples	Naples, Florida	Paradise Coast Sports Complex Stadium	5,000	(United States) Zak Gordon (interim)	Hummel	Physicians Regional Healthcare System
New York Cosmos	Paterson, New Jersey	Hinchliffe Stadium (Note: Multi-purpose stadium)	7,500	(Italy) Davide Corti	Capelli Sport	Ion Bank
One Knoxville SC	Knoxville, Tennessee	Covenant Health Park (Note: Baseball park)	6,500	(United States) Ian Fuller	Hummel	Regions Bank
Portland Hearts of Pine	Portland, Maine	Fitzpatrick Stadium	5,500	(United States) Bobby Murphy	Hummel	Visit Maine
Richmond Kickers	Richmond, Virginia	City Stadium	6,000	(United States) Brian Ownby (interim)	Hummel	Ukrop's
Sarasota Paradise	Lakewood Ranch, Florida	Premier Sports Campus	3,000	(Finland) Mika Elovaara	Hummel	TBA
Spokane Velocity FC	Spokane, Washington	ONE Spokane Stadium	5,100	(England) Leigh Veidman	Capelli Sport	Spokane Tribe Resort
Union Omaha	Omaha, Nebraska	Morrison Stadium	6,000	(Colombia) Vincenzo Candela	Hummel	Centris Federal Credit Union
Westchester SC	Mount Vernon, New York	The Stadium at Memorial Field	3,900	(United States) George Gjokaj	Hummel	Northwell Health

=== Managerial changes ===
Team	Outgoing manager	Manner of departure	Date of vacancy	Incoming manager	Date of appointment	Ref.
Westchester SC	(Republic of Ireland) Dave Carton	Dismissal	November 3, 2025	(United States) George Gjokaj	November 17, 2025	
Greenville Triumph SC	(Bermuda) Rick Wright	Retirement	December 17, 2025	(United States) Dave Dixon	December 17, 2025	
Richmond Kickers	(United States) Darren Sawatzky	Contract bought out by Sporting Cascades FC	June 15, 2026	(United States) Brian Ownby (Note: Interim manager)	June 15, 2026	
FC Naples	(United States) Matt Poland	Dismissal	July 10, 2026	(United States) Zak Gordon	July 10, 2026	
Greenville Triumph SC	(United States) Dave Dixon	Dismissal	September 9, 2026	(United States) Joel Tyson	September 9, 2026	

== Regular season ==
=== Format ===
This season's schedule is a "home-and-away" schedule, meaning each team will play every other team twice: once home and once away. The top eight teams at the end of the season will qualify for the playoffs.

=== League table ===
Pos	Team	Pld	W	L	T	GF	GA	GD	Pts	Qualification
1	Charlotte Independence (S, C)	32	20	6	6	74	46	+28	66	Playoffs
2	Union Omaha	32	19	8	5	54	34	+20	62	Playoffs
3	AC Boise	32	17	8	7	51	41	+10	58	Playoffs
4	Forward Madison FC	32	16	8	8	54	30	+24	56	Playoffs
5	Spokane Velocity FC	32	16	10	6	50	44	+6	54	Playoffs
6	One Knoxville SC	32	15	8	9	52	36	+16	54	Playoffs
7	Chattanooga Red Wolves SC	32	14	13	5	51	45	+6	47	Playoffs
8	FC Naples	32	14	14	4	39	46	−7	46	Playoffs
9	Fort Wayne FC	32	12	11	9	47	42	+5	45	
10	Westchester SC	32	11	14	7	55	51	+4	40	
11	Sarasota Paradise	32	11	14	7	49	51	−2	40	
12	Corpus Christi FC	32	9	13	10	36	51	−15	37	
13	AV Alta FC	32	8	14	10	40	48	−8	34	
14	Portland Hearts of Pine	32	8	14	10	48	58	−10	34	
15	Greenville Triumph SC	32	8	18	6	37	60	−23	30	
16	New York Cosmos	32	7	19	6	40	66	−26	27	
17	Richmond Kickers	32	7	20	5	37	65	−28	26	

Source: USL League One
Rules for classification: 1) points; 2) total wins; 3) total goal differential; 4) total goals scored; 5) points earned against top four finishers; 6) disciplinary points; 7) drawing of lots.
(C) Champions; (S) Players' Shield winner

=== Results table ===
Home \ Away	ACB	AVA	CLT	CHA	COR	FTW	GVL	KNX	MAD	NAP	NYC	OMA	POR	RIC	SAR	SPK	WES
AC Boise	—	2–1	1–1	2–1	0–0	1–3	1–0	1–2	2–1	2–0	2–1	1–0	2–1	2–1	0–2	1–1	4–0
AV Alta	2–2	—	1–1	2–2	2–2	3–0	2–2	1–2	2–0	1–2	4–0	1–3	0–0	1–1	3–1	1–0	0–0
Charlotte	1–0	5–0	—	2–4	2–1	1–1	1–0	3–1	3–1	4–3	3–0	2–0	3–2	3–1	3–1	4–0	5–4
Chattanooga	2–3	1–0	2–3	—	3–0	0–1	3–1	1–0	1–0	1–0	3–3	1–3	1–1	5–0	4–1	0–1	2–0
Corpus Christi	2–1	0–0	1–3	2–1	—	1–3	1–0	2–2	0–2	0–1	0–2	1–2	3–2	1–0	4–1	0–0	2–2
Fort Wayne	0–2	0–0	2–2	1–2	1–1	—	3–0	2–3	0–0	2–2	2–4	0–2	3–0	2–0	1–3	3–0	1–0
Greenville	3–2	1–2	0–3	1–2	0–1	1–3	—	1–1	1–0	4–0	3–2	1–3	3–3	0–3	0–0	4–3	4–2
One Knoxville	2–2	2–3	2–1	3–0	0–0	2–1	2–0	—	1–2	0–0	3–1	1–2	1–1	1–0	2–1	0–2	0–0
Forward Madison	5–1	3–0	1–1	5–2	3–0	1–1	1–1	1–1	—	3–1	3–1	0–0	2–0	4–0	1–1	0–1	2–0
FC Naples	0–2	2–1	1–5	1–0	2–2	2–0	1–0	0–3	0–1	—	2–1	2–0	2–3	2–0	2–0	1–0	1–0
NY Cosmos	1–2	1–0	3–2	1–1	0–0	2–0	0–3	0–3	2–2	1–0	—	1–2	1–3	3–2	1–2	3–3	1–2
Union Omaha	3–2	3–1	2–0	2–0	2–1	0–1	2–0	2–1	1–0	2–1	1–1	—	2–2	5–1	1–1	3–1	2–2
Portland	1–2	1–0	4–1	1–2	0–2	1–4	1–1	0–0	1–2	1–1	3–1	1–2	—	5–1	1–4	2–1	2–1
Richmond	2–2	3–2	1–2	1–1	5–1	0–2	0–1	3–2	1–2	0–1	2–0	2–1	1–1	—	0–0	0–2	1–0
Sarasota	0–1	1–2	2–3	3–2	2–1	2–2	6–0	1–2	1–3	2–3	2–1	2–0	1–0	3–2	—	1–1	2–2
Spokane	2–2	3–1	3–0	1–0	2–3	3–1	2–1	0–4	0–1	2–1	3–1	1–0	3–3	3–1	1–0	—	2–1
Westchester	0–1	2–1	1–1	0–1	5–1	1–1	4–0	2–3	3–2	3–2	3–0	2–1	5–1	5–2	2–0	1–3	—

Legend: Blue = home team win; Yellow = draw; Red = away team win.

== Playoffs ==
The 2026 USL League One Playoffs is the post-season championship of the USL League One season.

=== Bracket ===
Quarterfinals; October 30—November 1
1	Charlotte Independence	5
8	FC Naples	1
4	Forward Madison FC	2
5	Spokane Velocity FC	1
2	Union Omaha	1 (4)
7	Chattanooga Red Wolves SC	1 (5)
3	Athletic Club Boise	2
6	One Knoxville SC	0

Semifinals; November 7—8
1	Charlotte Independence	2
4	Forward Madison FC	1
7	Chattanooga Red Wolves SC	0
3	Athletic Club Boise	1

Final; November 14
1	Charlotte Independence	4
3	Athletic Club Boise	2

=== Schedule ===
==== Quarterfinals ====
October 30, 2026	Union Omaha	1–1 (a.e.t.) (4–5 p)	Chattanooga Red Wolves SC	Omaha, Nebraska
6:00 PM CDT	Wootton (yellow card) 36'; Gutierrez 66'; Kallman (yellow card) 90+3'	Report	Hernández 1'; Tapia (yellow card) 29'; Lombardi (yellow card) 59'; Vaughan (yellow card) 89'	Stadium: Morrison Stadium; Attendance: 3,011; Referee: Edson Carvajal
	Penalties
	Gutierrez (penalty scored); Owusu (penalty scored); Gómez (penalty missed); Guediri (penalty scored); Ors (penalty scored); Boudadi (penalty missed)		(penalty scored) Bentley; (penalty scored) Hallenberger; (penalty missed) Acosta; (penalty scored) Lombardi; (penalty scored) Lelin; (penalty scored) Jérez

October 30, 2026	Forward Madison FC	2–1	Spokane Velocity FC	Madison, Wisconsin
6:30 PM CDT	Karamoko 8'; Bolma 12'; McCamy (yellow card) 48'; Torres (yellow card) 80'; Munjoma (yellow card) 88'	Report	Opara 11'; Lewis (yellow card) 30'; Elmasnaouy (yellow card) 45+1'	Stadium: Breese Stevens Field; Attendance: 3,192; Referee: Alexandra Billeter

November 1, 2026	Charlotte Independence	5–1	FC Naples	Charlotte, North Carolina
7:00 PM EST	Fuchs (yellow card) 6'; Uderitz 10' (o.g.); Bakero (yellow card) 20'; Saydee 45+1'; Jaime 59'; Coulibaly (yellow card) 73'; Pinho 79', 84'	Report	Osorio (yellow card) 45+4'; Mastrantonio 88'	Stadium: American Legion Memorial Stadium; Attendance: 2,200; Referee: Carlos Rodriguez

November 1, 2026	Athletic Club Boise	2–0	One Knoxville SC	Garden City, Idaho
6:00 PM MST	Moshobane 37'; Kostyshyn (yellow card) 54'; Bodily (yellow card) 76'; Barea 90+2'	Report	Gøling (yellow card) 22'; Baker (yellow card) 58'; Zarokostas (yellow card) 90+6'	Stadium: Stadium at Expo Idaho; Attendance: 7,613; Referee: Muhammad Kaleia

==== Semifinals ====
November 7, 2026	Athletic Club Boise	1–0 (a.e.t.)	Chattanooga Red Wolves SC	Garden City, Idaho
6:00 PM MST	Dengler (yellow card) 31'; Miller (yellow card) 40'; Barea 114'; Kliewer (yellow card) 116'; Jérez (yellow card) 120+2'	Report	Clapier (yellow card) 51'; Mackenzie (yellow card) 90+2'; Hallenberger (yellow card) 98'; Vaughan (yellow card) 105+3'	Stadium: Stadium at Expo Idaho; Attendance: 8,003; Referee: Abdou Ndiaye

November 8, 2026	Charlotte Independence	2–1	Forward Madison FC	Charlotte, North Carolina
6:00 PM EST	Bakero 9'; Coulibaly 40'; Manin (yellow card) 70'; Dimick (yellow card) 90+4'	Report	Karamoko 11'; Gyamfi (yellow card) 80'	Stadium: American Legion Memorial Stadium; Attendance: 2,189; Referee: Elvis Osmanovic

==== USL League One Final ====
November 14, 2026	Charlotte Independence	4–2	Athletic Club Boise	Matthews, North Carolina
7:30 PM EST	Skinner (yellow card) 42' (goal) 84'; Marou 58', 87', 90+2' (yellow card) 70'; Romero (yellow card) 90+10'	Report	Moshobane 33'; Mayaka (yellow card) 41'; Dengler (yellow card) 63'; Manin 76' (o.g.); Amang (yellow card) 90+6'	Stadium: Sportsplex at Matthews; Attendance: 3,326; Referee: Matthew Thompson

Championship Game MVP: (Cameroon) Souaibou Marou (CLT)

== Attendances ==
Pos	Team	Total	High	Low	Average	Change
1	Athletic Club Boise	115,458	7,254	7,201	7,216	n/a
2	Portland Hearts of Pine	99,919	6,400	6,033	6,245	+7.1%
3	Richmond Kickers	65,267	5,494	3,043	4,079	−7.6%
4	AV Alta FC	61,896	5,024	2,710	3,869	−7.7%
5	Forward Madison FC	60,476	4,820	3,106	3,780	−5.3%
6	Fort Wayne FC	56,857	4,493	2,389	3,554	+138.8%
7	One Knoxville SC	55,205	5,205	1,811	3,450	+13.9%
8	Greenville Triumph SC	44,824	4,383	1,465	2,802	+34.3%
9	Union Omaha	40,809	5,094	1,732	2,551	−16.2%
10	FC Naples	40,074	4,072	1,374	2,505	−28.2%
11	Spokane Velocity FC	29,188	2,677	1,155	1,824	−22.3%
12	Sarasota Paradise	27,837	2,791	1,406	1,740	+29.1%
13	Westchester SC	27,723	2,637	1,035	1,733	+2.1%
14	New York Cosmos	23,955	4,099	813	1,497	n/a
15	Corpus Christi FC	22,790	2,830	268	1,424	n/a
16	Chattanooga Red Wolves SC	21,371	2,750	1,010	1,336	−35.0%
17	Charlotte Independence	10,255	925	524	641	−10.2%
	League total	818,257	7,247	268	3,008	+8.0%

Updated to games played on 24 October 2026
Source: https://www.backheeled.com/usl-attendance/

== Player statistics ==
As of October 24, 2026

=== Goals ===
Rank	Player	Club	Goals
1	(Cameroon) Souaibou Marou	Charlotte Independence	18
2	(United States) Conor McGlynn	Westchester SC	16
3	(Northern Ireland) Ryan Carmichael	Forward Madison FC	14
4	(United States) Omar Hernandez	Chattanooga Red Wolves SC	13
5	(Spain) Sergio Ors	Union Omaha	12
6	(United States) Ajmeer Spengler	New York Cosmos	11
6	(United States) Taig Healy	Fort Wayne FC	11
6	(Israel) Denis Krioutchenkov	One Knoxville SC	11
9	(Guinea) Aboubacar Camara	Portland Hearts of Pine	10
9	(United States) Adam Aoumaich	AV Alta FC	10
9	(Uruguay) Sebastián Guenzatti	New York Cosmos	10

=== Hat-tricks ===
Player	Team	Against	Score	Date
(United States) Ajmeer Spengler	New York Cosmos	Charlotte Independence	3–2 (H)	April 3
(England) Matt Bentley	Chattanooga Red Wolves SC	Sarasota Paradise	4–1 (H)	May 9
(Northern Ireland) Ryan Carmichael	Forward Madison FC	Chattanooga Red Wolves SC	5–2 (H)	July 29
(Germany) Tarik Pannholzer	Richmond Kickers	Corpus Christi FC	5–1 (H)	October 17
(Cameroon) Souaibou Marou	Charlotte Independence	Greenville Triumph SC	0–3 (A)	October 17
(Cameroon) Souaibou Marou	Charlotte Independence	Athletic Club Boise	4–2 (H)	November 14

=== Assists ===
Rank	Player	Club	Assists
1	(Spain) Jon Bakero	Charlotte Independence	18
2	(United States) Ajmeer Spengler	New York Cosmos	11
3	(United States) Roman Torres	Forward Madison FC	9
3	(United States) Blake Bowen	Corpus Christi FC	9
3	(Brazil) Anderson Rosa	Sarasota Paradise	9
6	(United States) Kyle Evans	Westchester SC	8
7	(England) Ollie Wright	Portland Hearts of Pine	7
7	(Haiti) Jerry Desdunes	AV Alta FC	7
7	(United States) Christopher Jaime	Charlotte Independence	7
7	(England) Teddy Baker	One Knoxville SC	7
7	(United States) Omar Hernandez	Chattanooga Red Wolves SC	7
7	(Republic of Ireland) Kevin O'Connor	FC Naples	7

=== Saves ===
Rank	Player	Club	Saves
1	(United States) Hunter Morse	Portland Hearts of Pine	107
2	(Canada) Yann-Alexandre Fillion	Richmond Kickers	101
2	(United States) Matt Levy	Charlotte Independence	101
3	(United States) Edward Delgado	FC Naples	95
4	(Trinidad and Tobago) Denzil Smith	AV Alta FC	92
4	(United States) Alex Sutton	Sarasota Paradise	92
7	(United States) Jason Smith	Chattanooga Red Wolves SC	84
8	(Philippines) Bernd Schipmann	Fort Wayne FC	77
9	(Republic of Ireland) James Talbot	Corpus Christi FC	77
9	(United States) JT Harms	Forward Madison FC	77

=== Clean sheets ===
Rank	Player	Club	Clean Sheets
1	(Philippines) Bernd Schipmann	Fort Wayne FC	10
1	(United States) JT Harms	Forward Madison FC	10
3	(United States) Edward Delgado	FC Naples	9
3	(United States) Johan Garibay	One Knoxville SC	9
5	(United States) Jonathan Kliewer	Athletic Club Boise	8
6	(Republic of Ireland) James Talbot	Corpus Christi FC	7
6	(United States) Sean Lewis	Spokane Velocity	7
6	(United States) Jason Smith	Chattanooga Red Wolves SC	7
6	(United States) Matt Levy	Charlotte Independence	7
10	(Trinidad and Tobago) Denzil Smith	AV Alta FC	6

== League awards ==
=== Individual awards ===
Award	Winner	Team	Reason	Ref.
Player of the Year	(Spain) Jon Bakero	Charlotte Independence	18 assists,26 goal contributions (equals Trevor Amann record of goal contributions in a USL League One Season),goal contributions more than one-third of the team total of goals(74 goals)	
Golden Boot	(Cameroon) Souaibou Marou	Charlotte Independence	18 goals	
Golden Glove	(United States) Cole Jensen	Union Omaha	15 goals allowed; 54 saves on a 78.26% save percentage	
Golden Playmaker	(Spain) Jon Bakero	Charlotte Independence	18 assists	
Defender of the Year	(Brazil) Anderson Rosa	Sarasota Paradise	Most goals scored by a defender (8) in the 2026 Regular Season	
Young Player of the Year	(Israel) Denis Krioutchenkov	One Knoxville SC	11 goals, 5 assists, and 16 goal contributions first player eligible to win the award with that stat line	
Goalkeeper of the Year	(United States) Matt Levy	Charlotte Independence	Conceding 1.3 goals per game, 101 Saves, 72.5% save percentage, and -3.68 Goals Prevented in 30 Starts	
Coach of the Year	(United States) Mike Jeffries	Charlotte Independence	Set the record for most points(66),wins(20) and goals (74) scored in the Regular Season to winning the Players’ Shield for the Charlotte Independence	
Most Valuable Performer				
Comeback Player of the Year				
Goal of the Year				
Save of the Year				

=== All-league teams ===
First Team
Goalkeeper	Defenders	Midfielders	Forwards
(United States) Matt Levy (CLT) (Goalkeeper of the Year)	(Portugal) Tiago Dias (FW) (Ghana) Samuel Owusu (OMA) (Mexico) Javen Romero (CLT) (Brazil) Anderson Rosa (SAR)	(England) Teddy Baker (KNX) (Spain) Jon Bakero (CLT) (Golden Playmaker,Player Of The Year) (United States) Conor McGlynn (WES)	(Northern Ireland) Ryan Carmichael (MAD) (Israel) Denis Krioutchenkov (KNX) (Cameroon) Souaibou Marou (CLT) (Golden Boot)

Second Team
Goalkeeper	Defenders	Midfielders	Forwards
(United States) JT Harms (MAD)	(Austria) Jacob Crull (ACB) (United States) Brent Kallman (OMA) (United States) Camron Miller (SPK) (United States) Joey Skinner (CLT)	(Kenya) Philip Mayaka (ACB) (United States) Ajmeer Spengler (NYC) (United States) Roman Torres (MAD)	(Haiti) Jerry Desdunes (AV) (Grenada) Shavon John-Brown (SPK) (Spain) Sergio Ors Navarro (OMA)

=== Monthly awards ===
Month	Player of the Month			Coach of the Month		References
Month	Player	Club	Position	Coach	Club	References
March	(Israel) Denis Krioutchenkov	One Knoxville SC	Forward	(United States) Matt Glaeser	Forward Madison FC	
April	(Ukraine) Denys Kostyshyn	Athletic Club Boise	Forward	(United States) Ian Fuller	One Knoxville SC	
May	(England) Ollie Wright	Portland Hearts of Pine	Midfielder	(Colombia) Vincenzo Candela	Union Omaha	
June	(Honduras) Luis Alvarez	Charlotte Independence	Midfielder	(United States) Mike Jeffries	Charlotte Independence	
July	(France) Lilian Ricol	Fort Wayne FC	Forward	(United States) Matt Glaeser	Forward Madison FC	
August	(Spain) Jon Bakero	Charlotte Independence	Midfielder	(United States) Mike Jeffries	Charlotte Independence	
September	(United States) Lalo Delgado	FC Naples	Goalkeeper	(Colombia) Vincenzo Candela	Union Omaha	
October	(Norway) Daniel Burko	Westchester SC	Forward	(United States) Zak Gordon	FC Naples	

=== Midseason awards ===
Goalkeeper of the Year		Defender of the Year		Coach of the Year		Young Player of the Year		Player of the Year		References
(United States) Matt Levy	Charlotte Independence	(Brazil) Anderson Rosa	Sarasota Paradise	(Colombia) Vincenzo Candela	Union Omaha	(Israel) Denis Krioutchenkov	One Knoxville SC	(Honduras) Luis Álvarez	Charlotte Independence	

=== Weekly awards ===
Player of the Week
Week	Player	Club	Position	Reason	Ref.
1	(Israel) Denis Krioutchenkov	One Knoxville SC	Forward	2 goals; 1 assist in debut vs Westchester	
2	(United States) Roman Torres	Forward Madison FC	Midfielder	Strong two-way performance vs Knoxville	
3	(United States) Diego Gutierrez	Union Omaha	Forward	2 goals vs Boise	
4	(United States) Azaad Liadi	Greenville Triumph SC	Forward	2 goals; 1 assists vs Westchester	
5	(United States) Ajmeer Spengler	New York Cosmos	Forward	Hattrick vs Charlotte	
6	(Netherlands) Dean Guezen	Westchester SC	Midfielder	2 goals vs Sarasota	
7	(Ukraine) Denys Kostyshyn	Athletic Club Boise	Midfielder	2 goals vs Westchester	
8/9	(England) Ollie Wright	Portland Hearts of Pine	Forward	2 goals; 1 assists vs New York	
10	(England) Matt Bentley	Chattanooga Red Wolves	Forward	Hat trick and 1 assist vs Sarasota	
11/12	(United States) Adam Aoumaich	AV Alta FC	Midfielder	3 goals in 2 games	
13	(Ivory Coast) Claudel N’goubou	Forward Madison FC	Midfielder	1 goal in strong two way performance vs Corpus Christi	
14/15	(Honduras) Luis Álvarez	Charlotte Independence	Midfielder	5 goals; 1 Assist in three games	
16	(Mexico) Jonathan Jiménez	Westchester SC	Midfielder	2 goals vs Portland	
17/18	(Guinea) Aboubacar Camara	Portland Hearts of Pine	Forward	2 goals; 1 assist vs Richmond and Naples	
19/20	(Canada) Kerfella Toure	Forward Madison FC	Defender	2 goals vs Richmond	
21	(Grenada) Shavon John-Brown	Spokane Velocity	Midfielder	2 goals in second half comeback vs Fort Wayne	
22	(Northern Ireland) Ryan Carmichael	Forward Madison FC	Forward	Recording the first hat trick in Forward Madison Club History	
23	(Honduras) Darwin Espinal	Richmond Kickers	Midfielder	scored both goals in win over New York	
24	(United States) Christopher Jaime	Charlotte Independence	Midfielder	1 goal; 1 assist win over Sarasota	
25	(Brazil) Anderson Rosa	Sarasota Paradise	Defender	1 goal; 1 assist in 4 point week vs Chattanooga	
26	(Spain) Jon Bakero	Charlotte Independence	Forward	5 goal contributions in 5–0 win against AV Alta	
27	(The Gambia) Lamin Jawneh	New York Cosmos	Midfielder	3 goals in 2 games	
28	(United States) Joey Skinner	Charlotte Independence	Defender	2 goals in 5-4 win vs Westchester	
29	(United States) Conor McGlynn	Westchester SC	Midfielder	3 goals in 6 point week to lead golden boot race	
30	(United States) Ajmeer Spengler	New York Cosmos	Midfielder	2 goals in 3–2 victory over Richmond	
31	(Spain) Nil Vinyals	Spokane Velocity	Midfielder	1 goal, 2 assists in 3–3 draw against Portland	
32	(United States) Joey Skinner	Charlotte Independence	Defender	1 goal, 1 assist in 3–0 victory against New York	
33	(Cameroon) Souaibou Marou	Charlotte Independence	Forward	Hattrick in 3–0 victory against Greenville	
34	(Guinea) Aboubacar Camara	Portland Hearts of Pine	Forward	2 goals in 4–1 victory against Charlotte	

Goal of the Week
Week	Player	Club	Opponent	Ref.
1	(United States) Christopher Garcia	FC Naples	Fort Wayne FC	
2	(Netherlands) Darren Sidoel	New York Cosmos	Portland Hearts of Pine	
3	(England) Jack Denton	Spokane Velocity	New York Cosmos	
4	(United States) Brandon Fricke	Greenville Triumph SC	New York Cosmos	
5	(Senegal) Babacar Diene	One Knoxville SC	Sarasota Paradise	
6	(United States) Taig Healy	Fort Wayne FC	Chattanooga Red Wolves SC	
7	(Ukraine) Denys Kostyshyn	Athletic Club Boise	Westchester SC	
8/9	(England) Ollie Wright	Portland Hearts of Pine	New York Cosmos	
10	(Ghana) Godwin Antwi	AV Alta FC	Forward Madison FC	
11/12	(Brazil) Anderson Rosa	Sarasota Paradise	AV Alta FC	
13	(Brazil) Anderson Rosa	Sarasota Paradise	New York Cosmos	
14/15	(United States) Christian Ortiz	AV Alta FC	Sarasota Paradise	
16	(United States) Cesar Bahena Jr.	AV Alta FC	Greenville Triumph SC	
17/18	(Spain) Jon Bakero	Charlotte Independence	Corpus Christi FC	
19/20	(Venezuela) Abel Caputo	One Knoxville SC	Fort Wayne FC	
21	(Uruguay) Sebastián Guenzatti	New York Cosmos	Athletic Club Boise	
22	(United States) Jimmie Villalobos	AV Alta FC	Richmond Kickers	
23	(United States) Blake Bodily	Athletic Club Boise	Forward Madison FC	
24	(France) Nicolas Likulia	FC Naples	Westchester SC	
25	(United States) Ajmeer Spengler	New York Cosmos	Corpus Christi FC	
26	(United States) Taig Healy	Fort Wayne FC	Portland Hearts of Pine	
27	(United States) Eli Conway	One Knoxville SC	AV Alta FC	
28	(South Africa) Tumi Moshobane	Athletic Club Boise	New York Cosmos	
29	(United States) Julian Cisneros	FC Naples	Fort Wayne FC	
30	(Sierra Leone) Jay Tee Kamara	Portland Hearts of Pine	Sarasota Paradise	
31	(Senegal) Omar Ciss	FC Naples	New York Cosmos	
32	(United States) Austin Amer	Richmond Kickers	Sarasota Paradise	
33	(United States) Adam Aoumaich	AV Alta FC	Athletic Club Boise	
34	(Colombia) Andrés Ferrín	FC Naples	Spokane Velocity	

Save of the Week
Week	Player	Club	Opponent	Ref.
1	(United States) Johan Garibay	One Knoxville SC	Westchester SC	
2	(Philippines) Bernd Schipmann	Fort Wayne FC	Sarasota Paradise	
3	(United States) Kash Oladapo	Portland Hearts of Pine	AV Alta FC	
4	(United States) Matt Levy	Charlotte Independence	Spokane Velocity	
5	(United States) Edward Delgado	FC Naples	Greenville Triumph SC	
6	(United States) Andrew Hammersley	Westchester SC	Sarasota Paradise	
7	(United States) Matt Levy	Charlotte Independence	One Knoxville SC	
8/9	(United States) JT Harms	Forward Madison FC	Sarasota Paradise	
10	(United States) Matt Levy	Charlotte Independence	Corpus Christi FC	
11/12	(United States) Matt Levy	Charlotte Independence	Forward Madison FC	
13	(United States) Javier Garcia	New York Cosmos	Sarasota Paradise	
14/15	(United States) Seth Torman	Greenville Triumph SC	Westchester SC	
16	(United States) Derrek Chan	New York Cosmos	Forward Madison FC	
17/18	(Trinidad and Tobago) Denzil Smith	AV Alta FC	Corpus Christi FC	
19/20	(United States) Matt Levy	Charlotte Independence	Chattanooga Red Wolves SC	
21	(United States) Matt Levy	Charlotte Independence	Richmond Kickers	
22	(Trinidad and Tobago) Denzil Smith	AV Alta FC	Richmond Kickers	
23	(United States) JT Harms	Forward Madison FC	Athletic Club Boise	
24	(United States) JT Harms	Forward Madison FC	Greenville Triumph SC	
25	(United States) Matt Levy	Charlotte Independence	Forward Madison FC	
26	(United States) Javier Garcia	New York Cosmos	Union Omaha	
27	(United States) Hunter Morse	Portland Hearts of Pine	Westchester SC	
28	(United States) Lalo Delgado	FC Naples	One Knoxville SC	
29	(United States) Hunter Morse	Portland Hearts of Pine	Chattanooga Red Wolves SC	
30	(United States) Lalo Delgado	FC Naples	Chattanooga Red Wolves SC	
31	(United States) Matt Levy	Charlotte Independence	Sarasota Paradise	
32	(Trinidad and Tobago) Denzil Smith	AV Alta FC	Greenville Triumph SC	
33	(United States) Matt Levy	Charlotte Independence	Greenville Triumph SC	
33	(United States) Jonathan Kliewer	Athletic Club Boise	Fort Wayne FC	

Team of the Week
Week	Goalkeeper	Defenders	Midfielders	Forwards	Coach	Bench	Ref.
**1**	(Ghana) Andema (ACB)	(Jamaica) Brown (KNX) (Bulgaria) Pehlivanov (AV) (United States) Cisneros (NAP)	(Haiti) Desdunes (AVA) (United States) Murphy (KNX) (Kenya) Mayaka (ACB) (Spain) Torrellas (NAP) (England) Baker (KNX)	(Israel) **Krioutchenkov** (KNX) (Ukraine) Kostyshyn (ACB)	(United States) Nate Miller (ACB)	(United States) Delgado (NAP) (United States) Ricketts (ACB) (United States) Anderson (RIC) (United States) Evans (WES) (United States) Garcia (NAP) (Greece) Zarokostas (KNX) (United States) Bodily (ACB)	
**2**	(United States) Morse (POR)	(Mexico) Romero (CLT) (United States) Humphrey (MAD) (Trinidad and Tobago) Powder (WES)	(Norway) Røed (SAR) (United States) **Torres** (MAD) (United States) Hernandez (CHA) (United States) Pondeca (CRP)	(United States) Garcia (NAP) (France) Ricol (FW) (Japan) Wada (POR)	(United States) Matt Glaeser (MAD)	(Mexico) Merancio (SPK) (Colombia) Riascos (CLT) (Ghana) Owusu (OMA) (England) Wright (POR) (United States) Bolanos (SAR) (South Africa) Kanyane (MAD) (United States) Becher (FW)	
**3**	(United States) Delgado (NAP)	(Morocco) Boudadi (OMA) (United States) Cisneros (NAP) (United States) Guediri (OMA)	(Grenada) John-Brown (SPK) (United States) Knapp (OMA) (Kenya) Mayaka (ACB) (England) Denton (SPK)	(United States) **Gutiérrez** (OMA) (Jamaica) Brett (SPK) (Republic of Ireland) O'Connor (NAP)	(Colombia) Vincenzo Candela (OMA)	(United States) Oladapo (POR) (Italy) Mastrantonio (NAP) (United States) Fitch (SPK) (United States) Villalobos (AV) (United States) Milovanov (NYC) (Spain) Torellas (NAP) (United States) Gil (SPK)	
**4**	(United States) Harms (MAD)	(Ghana) Owusu (OMA) (Mexico) Romero (CLT) (Jamaica) Brown (KNX)	(Honduras) Álvarez (CLT) (United States) Walker (SAR) (United States) Spengler (NYC) (United States) Torres (MAD)	(United States) **Liadi** (GVL) (United States) Hernandez (CHA) (Spain) Robles (GVL)	(United States) Dave Dixon (GVL)	(Republic of Ireland) Talbot (CRP) (United States) Guediri (OMA) (United States) Seagrist (GVL) (Italy) Galazzini (NYC) (Spain) Armas (FW) (United States) Bahena (AV) (Jamaica) Beckford (GVL)	
**5**	(United States) Jensen (OMA)	(Martinique) Manin (CLT) (Austria) Crull (ACB) (Trinidad and Tobago) Powder (WES)	(Ghana) Kwakwa (CRP) (United States) McGlynn (WES) (United States) Bolanos (SAR) (Mexico) Jiménez (WES)	(United States) **Spengler** (NYC) (Mexico) Faz (OMA) (Guinea-Bissau) Rodrigues (KNO)	(United States) George Gjokaj (WES)	(United States) Garibay (KNX) (United States) Dengler (ACB) (Italy) Mastrantonio (NAP) (United States) Bodily (ACB) (United States) Moon (ACB) (United States) Amaya (CLT) (Germany) Tekiela (OMA)	
**6**	(United States) Garibay (KNX)	(United States) Jordan (FW) (Ghana) Mensah (SPK) (Colombia) Solís (FW)	(Netherlands) **Guezen** (WES) (England) Denton (SPK) (Trinidad and Tobago) Poon-Angeron (POR) (United States) Bodily (ACB)	(United States) Garcia (NAP) (Haiti) Desdunes (AV) (Grenada) John-Brown (SPK)	(England) Leigh Veidman (SPK)	(United States) Hammersley (WES) (Nigeria) Opara (SPK) (Russia) Timchenko (WES) (Spain) Vinyals (SPK) (Spain) Torrellas (NAP) (United States) Healy (FW) (United States) Aoumaich (AV)	
**7**	(United States) Levy (CLT)	(United States) Ricketts (ACB) (Nicaragua) Glasser (NAP) (United States) Drack (POR) (United States) Dengler (ACB)	(Honduras) Espinal (RIC) (England) Wright (POR) (United States) Sasankhah (RIC)	(Spain) Bakero (CLT) (Ukraine) **Kostyshyn** (ACB) (United States) Linhares (KNX)	(United States) Darren Sawatzky (RIC)	(United States) Kliewer (ACB) (United States) Holt (NYC) (Germany) Pannholzer (RIC) (United States) Spengler (NYC) (United States) Murphy (KNX) (Uruguay) Guenzatti (NYC) (Senegal) Diene (KNX)	
**8/9**	(Republic of Ireland) Talbot (CRP)	(United States) Skinner (CLT) (United States) Humphrey (MAD) (Morocco) Boudadi (OMA)	(Sierra Leone) Kamara (POR) (United States) Gutierrez (OMA) (Uruguay) Martínez (CLT) (Norway) Røed (SAR)	(England) **Wright** (POR) (Israel) Krioutchenkov (KNX) (Senegal) Diene (KNX)	(United States) Ian Fuller (KNX)	(Canada) Fillion (RIC) (United States) Bowen (CRP) (Austria) Crull (ACB) (Spain) Armas (FW) (United States) Sasankhah (RIC) (United States) Bodily (ACB) (South Africa) Moshobane (ACB)	
**10**	(Philippines) Schipmann (FW)	(Mexico) Romero (CLT) (United States) Rempel (FW) (Nigeria) Murana (RIC)	(United States) Amaya (CLT) (El Salvador) Garay (FW) (Ghana) Antwi (AV) (Germany) Seufert (RIC)	(England) **Bentley** (CHA) (Colombia) Peláez (SPK) (United States) Healy (FW)	(United States) Mike Avery (FW)	(United States) Kliewer (ACB) (Ghana) Owusu (OMA) (United States) Adewole (CHA) (United States) Thomas (AV) (Honduras) Álvarez (CLT) (France) Ricol (FW) (Haiti) Desdunes (AV)	
**11/12**	(United States) Jensen (OMA)	(Brazil) Rosa (SAR) (United States) Gonzalez (AV) (United States) Rempel (FW)	(Honduras) Álvarez (CLT) (United States) Bowen (CRP) (United States) Gutierrez (OMA) (United States) **Aoumaich** (AV) (Peru) Fernandez (SPK)	(France) Ricol (FW) (Spain) Ors (OMA)	(Colombia) Vincenzo Candela (OMA)	(United States) S. Lewis (SPK) (Portugal) Dias (FW) (South Sudan) Jiba (OMA) (Spain) Armas (FW) (United States) Guediri (OMA) (England) Wright (POR) (Colombia) Arevalo (NAP)	
**13**	(United States) Sutton (SAR)	(United States) Gebhard (MAD) (South Sudan) Jiba (OMA) (Brazil) Rosa (SAR)	(Ivory Coast) **N’goubou** (MAD) (Honduras) Álvarez (CLT) (Jamaica) A. Lewis (SPK) (Sierra Leone) Kamara (POR)	(Ghana) Mensah (CHA) (Liberia) Saydee (CLT) (England) Bentley (CHA)	(Finland) Mika Elovaara (SAR)	(Trinidad and Tobago) Smith (AV) (United States) Ricketts (ACB) (Spain) Bakero (CLT) (Grenada) John-Brown (SPK) (United States) Amer (RIC) (Germany) Tekiela (OMA) (England) Wright (POR)	
**14/15**	(United States) Doumbia (AV)	(Brazil) Rosa (SAR) (Mexico) Jiménez (WES) (United States) Ortiz (AV)	(Honduras) **Álvarez** (CLT) (United States) Medina (CRP) (United States) Torres (MAD) (United States) Jaime (CLT)	(Haiti) Desdunes (AV) (Ivory Coast) N’goubou (MAD) (United States) Hernández (CHA)	(United States) Brian Kleiban (AV)	(Canada) Fillion (RIC) (Canada) Toure (MAD) (United States) McCamy (MAD) (Republic of Ireland) O'Connor (NAP) (Ghana) Ayimbila (CHA) (Liberia) Saydee (CLT) (Germany) Tekiela (OMA) (Argentina) Terzaghi (SAR)	
**16**	(Philippines) Schipmann (FW)	(United States) Ortiz (AV) (Ghana) Aymbila (CHA) (Scotland) McRobb (KNX)	(Mexico) **Jiménez** (WES) (England) Baker (KNX) (United States) McGlynn (WES) (United States) Linhares (KNX)	(Spain) Abeal (CRP) (England) Thomas (FW) (United States) Keegan (CRP)	(United States) Ian Fuller (KNX)	(United States) Kliewer (ACB) (United States Virgin Islands) Ramos (CHA) (United States) Jordan (FW) (United States) Jennings (WES) (United States) Torres (MAD) (Ghana) Kwakwa (CRP) (United States) Castro (MAD)	
**17/18**	(United States) Harms (MAD)	(Ghana) Owusu (OMA) (Nigeria) Gafar (FW) (Mexico) Romero (CLT)	(Brazil) Cabral (OMA) (England) Baker (KNX) (United States) Meek (GRE) (Cyprus) Georgallides (POR)	(Guinea) **Camara** (POR) (Spain) Bakero (CLT) (South Sudan) Akio (GRE)	(United States) Bobby Murphy (POR)	(Trinidad and Tobago) Smith (AV) (United States) Jones-Riley (POR) (Scotland) McRobb (KNX) (United States) Bowen (CRP) (United States) Aoumaich (AV) (United States) Gonzalez (POR) (United States) O. Hernandez (CHA)	
**19/20**	(United States) Lewis (SPK)	(Canada) **Toure** (MAD) (United States) Rempel (FW) (France) Covi (SPK)	(Spain) Navarro (OMA) (United States) K. Evans (WES) (United States) P. Hernández (CHA) (United States) Skinner (CLT)	(Argentina) Lombardi (CHA) (Northern Ireland) R. Carmichael (MAD) (Cameroon) Amang (ACB)	(England) Scott Mackenzie (CHA)	(United States) Morse (POR) (United States) Miller (SPK) (Jamaica) McLeod (KNX) (United States) Gavilanes (OMA) (United States) Aoumaich (AV) (United States) Torres (MAD) (France) Ricol (FW)	
**21**	(United States) Marinelli (WES)	(Mexico) Romero (CLT) (Austria) Crull (ACB) (United States Virgin Islands) Ramos (CHA)	(Brazil) Cabral (OMA) (United States) Gil (SPK) (United States) K. Evans (WES) (United States) Medina (CRP)	(United States) Gutiérrez (OMA) (Grenada) **John-Brown** (SPK) (Ghana) Bolma (MAD)	(England) Leigh Veidman (SPK)	(United States) Lewis (SPK) (United States) Pierre (WES) (United States) Fitch (SPK) (United States) McGlynn (WES) (Liberia) Saydee (CLT) (United States) Bodily (ACB) (Cameroon) Marou (CLT)	
**22**	(Republic of Ireland) Talbot (CRP)	(Morocco) Boudadi (OMA) (United States) Meek (GVL) (United States) Guediri (OMA)	(Spain) Bakero (CLT) (United States) Torres (MAD) (United States) C. Evans (GVL) (United States) Bolduc (RIC)	(Cameroon) Marou (CLT) (Northern Ireland) **R. Carmichael** (MAD) (Cyprus) Georgallides (POR)	(United States) Matt Glaeser (MAD)	(United States) Jensen (OMA) (Spain) Barea (ACB) (Somalia) Nour (GVL) (United States) Gonzalez (POR) (United States) Jaime (CLT) (Guinea) Camara (POR) (United States) Freeman (RIC)	
**23**	(Jamaica) Knight (GVL)	(United States) Anderson (RIC) (Republic of Ireland) Keaney (CRP) (Mexico) Romero (CLT)	(Honduras) **Espinal** (RIC) (Republic of Ireland) O'Connor (NAP) (United States) Conway (KNX) (Spain) Navarro (OMA)	(United States) Bowen (CRP) (Haiti) Desdunes (AV) (United States) Bodily (ACB)	(Libya) Éamon Zayed (CRP)	(United States) Delgado (NAP) (Morocco) Boudadi (OMA) (United States) Perkins (KNX) (Trinidad and Tobago) Gomez (CRP) (Kenya) Mayaka (ACB) (England) Wootton (OMA) (Cameroon) Marou (CLT)	
**24**	(Trinidad and Tobago) Smith (AV)	(United States) Guediri (OMA) (Republic of Ireland) Keaney (CRP) (Russia) Timchenko (WES)	(United States) **Jaime** (CLT) (United States) McGlynn (WES) (England) Baker (KNX) (United States) Torres (MAD)	(United States) Gavilanes (OMA) (Spain) Bakero (CLT) (Spain) Navarro (OMA)	(Libya) Éamon Zayed (CRP)	(United States) Garibay (KNX) (England) Skelton (KNX) (Spain) Armas (FW) (United States) Ramos (NYC) (United States) Evans (WES) (Mexico) Jiménez (WES) (Uruguay) Guenzatti (NYC)	
**25**	(United States) Morse (POR)	(Brazil) **Rosa** (SAR) (United States) Ricketts (ACB) (Nigeria) Opara (SPK)	(England) Baker (KNX) (Brazil) Cabral (OMA) (United States) Torres (MAD) (Martinique) Manin (CLT) (United States) Spengler (NYC)	(Argentina) Terzaghi (SAR) (United States) Garcia (NAP)	(Italy) Davide Corti (NYC)	(United States) Levy (CLT) (Trinidad and Tobago) Yearwood (NAP) (Puerto Rico) Stretch (SAR) (United States) Elias (WES) (United States) Ramos (NYC) (United States) Bolanos (SAR) (The Gambia) Jawneh (NYC)	
**26**	(United States) Harms (MAD)	(United States) Polak (GVL) (Portugal) Dias (FW) (United States) Dimick (CLT)	(United States) Healy (FW) (United States) Torres (MAD) (Grenada) John-Brown (SPK) (United States) Moon (ACB)	(Spain) **Bakero** (CLT) (United States) Liadi (GVL) (Somalia) Nour (GVL)	(United States) Dave Dixon (GVL)	(United States) Jensen (OMA) (United States) Munjoma (MAD) (United States) Jordan (FW) (United States) Herrera (GVL) (England) Denton (SPK) (France) Awoudor (FW) (United States) Bodily (ACB)	
**27**	(United States) Sutton (SAR)	(England) Dickerson (WES) (United States) Ricketts (ACB) (Brazil) Rosa (SAR)	(The Gambia) **Jawneh** (NYC) (England) Baker (KNX) (United States) Spengler (NYC) (United States) Bodily (ACB)	(Northern Ireland) R. Carmichael (MAD) (Brazil) Pinho (CLT) (Spain) Navarro (OMA)	(Colombia) Vincenzo Candela (OMA)	(United States) Harms (MAD) (Morocco) Boudadi (OMA) (United States) Adewole (CHA) (United States) Conway (KNX) (Ivory Coast) Ngoubou (MAD) (Uruguay) Guenzatti (NYC) (Spain) Bakero (CLT)	
**28**	(United States) Delgado (NAP)	(United States) **Skinner** (CLT) (Senegal) Faye (POR) (South Sudan) Jiba (OMA)	(United States) Bodily (ACB) (United States) Jaime (CLT) (Spain) Torrellas (NAP) (United States) O. Hernandez (CHA)	(United States) Becher (FW) (Netherlands) Blommestijn (WES) (Spain) Bakero (CLT)	(Colombia) Vincenzo Candela (OMA)	(United States) Harms (ACB) (Morocco) Boudadi (OMA) (Japan) Hata (POR) (United States) Torres (MAD) (Uruguay) Guenzatti (NYC) (Spain) Navarro (OMA) (United States) Krueger (SAR)	
**29**	(United States) Levy (CLT)	(Morocco) Boudadi (OMA) (United States) Skinner (CLT) (Brazil) Rosa (SAR)	(United States) Bolanos (SAR) (United States) **McGlynn** (WES) (United States) Spengler (NYC) (Brazil) Cabral (OMA)	(Netherlands) Guezen (WES) (Norway) Røed (SAR) (Northern Ireland) R. Carmichael (MAD)	(United States) George Gjokaj (WES)	(United States) Sutton (SAR) (Portugal) Dias (FW) (United States) Kiingi (SAR) (United States) Krueger (SAR) (Spain) Barea (ACB) (Mexico) Jiménez (WES) (Ghana) Bolma (MAD)	
**30**	(United States) Delgado (NAP)	(Brazil) Rosa (SAR) (Portugal) Dias (FW) (Nigeria) Opara (SPK)	(United States) Bolanos (SAR) (El Salvador) Cáceres (OMA) (United States) **Spengler** (NYC) (England) Denton (SPK)	(Norway) Røed (SAR) (France) Koffi (NYC) (Spain) Navarro (OMA)	(Finland) Mika Elovaara (SAR)	(United States) Lewis (SPK) (Morocco) Boudadi (OMA) (United States) Jordan (FW) (Mexico) Romero (CLT) (United States) Bowen (CRP) (Cameroon) Amang (ACB) (United States) Miglietti (NAP)	
**31**	(United States) Levy (CLT)	(United States) Loura (WES) (United States) Hanson (RIC) (Norway) Burko (WES)	(Jamaica) A. Lewis (SPK) (Senegal) Ciss (NAP) (Spain) **Vinyals** (SPK) (United States) Torres (MAD)	(United States) Gonzalez (SAR) (Cameroon) Marou (CLT) (Jamaica) Brett (SPK)	(United States) Brian Ownby (RIC)	(United States) Torman (GVL) (Ghana) Yaro (ACB) (United States) Gómez (CHA) (Spain) Torrellas (NAP) (United States) P. Hernández (CHA) (Spain) Bakero (CLT) (United States) O. Hernandez (CHA)	
**32**	(United States) Delgado (NAP)	(United States) **Skinner** (CLT) (United States) Rempel (FW) (Nigeria) Opara (SPK)	(United States) Evans (WES) (United States) Jaime (CLT) (England) Baker (KNX) (United States) Ricketts (ACB)	(Netherlands) Blommestijn (WES) (United States) Liadi (GVL) (United States) Bahena Jr. (AV)	(United States) Zak Gordon (NAP)	(Philippines) Schipmann (FW) (United States) Kiingi (SAR) (Portugal) Dias (FW) (Jamaica) A. Lewis (SPK) (Kenya) Mayaka (ACB) (Spain) Bakero (CLT) (United States) Miglietti (NAP)	
**33**	(United States) Levy (CLT)	(Norway) Burko (WES) (United States) Skinner (CLT) (Brazil) Rosa (SAR)	(Denmark) Gøling (KNX) (United States) Elmasnaouy (SPK) (England) Agyaakwah (GVL) (Spain) Bakero (CLT)	(Germany) Pannholzer (RIC) (Cameroon) **Marou** (CLT) (Spain) Barea (ACB)	(United States) George Gjokaj (WES)	(United States) Oladapo (POR) (United States) Rempel (FW) (United States) K. Carmichael (MAD) (United States) Munjoma (MAD) (United States) Torres (MAD) (Israel) Krioutchenkov (KNX) (Northern Ireland) R. Carmichael (MAD)	
**34**	(United States) Kliewer (ACB)	(Norway) Drack (POR) (Canada) Toure (MAD) (England) Sims (GVL)	(United States) Spengler (NYC) (Norway) Burko (WES) (United States) Moon (ACB) (Republic of Ireland) O'Connor (NAP)	(Guinea) **Camara** (POR) (Spain) Robles (GVL) (Grenada) John-Brown (SPK)	(United States) Zak Gordon (NAP)	(United States) Torman (GVL) (United States) Uderitz (NAP) (Argentina) Lombardi (CHA) (United States) Ramos (NYC) (Jamaica) A. Lewis (SPK) (United States) Collins (NAP) (United States) Aoumaich (AV)	
**Bold** denotes Player of the Week

== USL Cup ==
All teams once again competed in the USL Cup, along with the higher division USL Championship.

Charlotte Independence and Spokane Velocity both won their groups and advanced to the quarterfinals, but both were eliminated by a USL Championship club. All of the remaining League One clubs were eliminated in the group stage.

== See also ==
- USL League One
