= Dean Guezen =

Dutch footballer (born 1998)

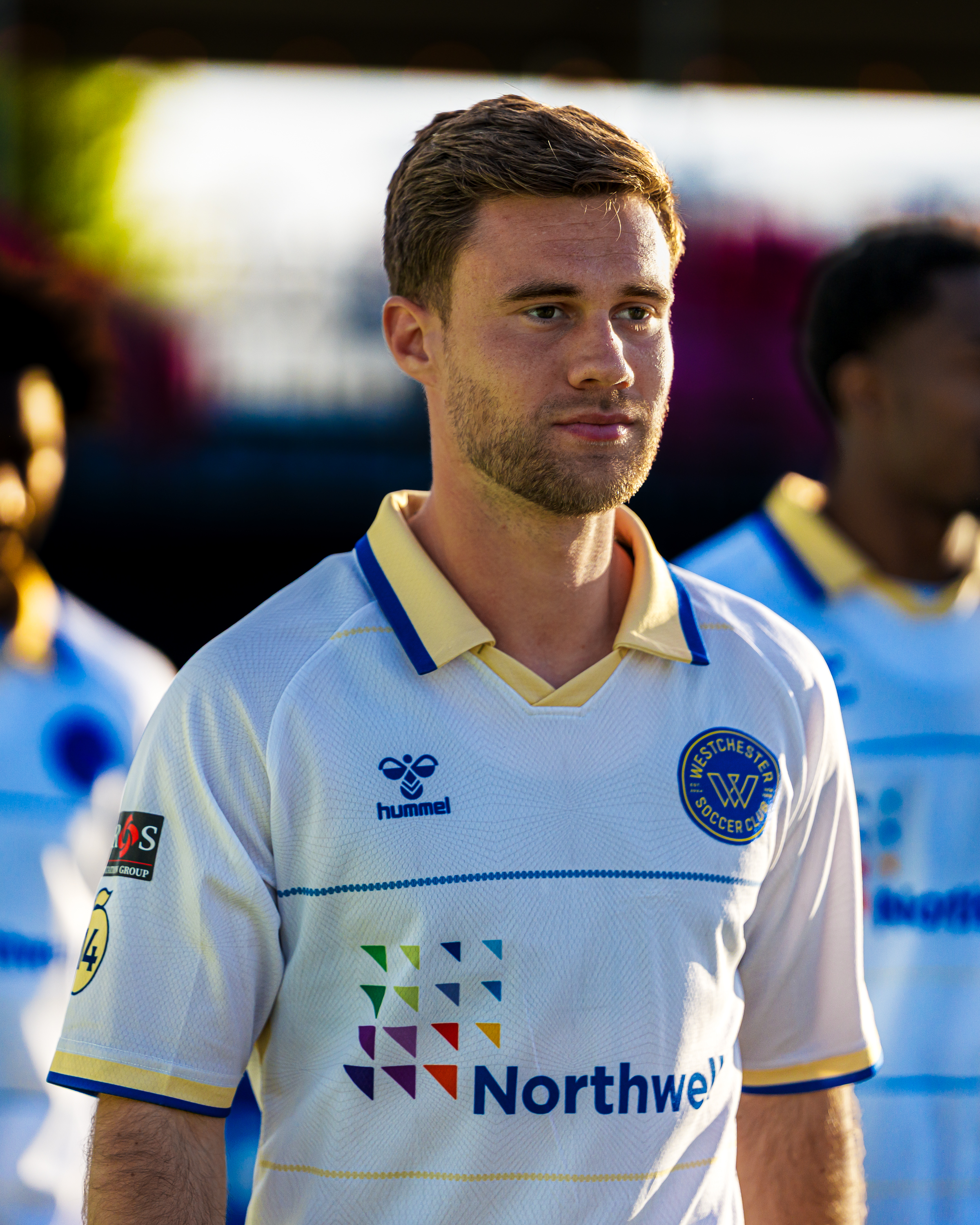
- Guezen with Westchester SC in 2026

Personal information
- Full name: Dean Diego Guezen
- Date of birth: 18 December 1998 (age 27)
- Place of birth: Amsterdam, Netherlands
- Height: 1.77 m (5 ft 10 in)
- Position: Midfielder

Team information
- Current team: Westchester SC
- Number: 10

Youth career
- –2006: AFC
- 2006–2007: Ajax
- De Dijk
- –2014: IVV
- 2014–2015: AFC
- 2015–2017: Feyenoord
- 2017–2018: ADO Den Haag
- 2019–2020: Cambuur

Senior career*
Years	Team	Apps	(Gls)
2020–2022	TOP Oss	40	(2)
2022–2023	PEC Zwolle	1	(0)
2023–2024	Zagłębie Sosnowiec	34	(0)
2025–	Westchester	51	(9)
- * Club domestic league appearances and goals as of 31 October 2026

Dean Diego Guezen (born 18 December 1998) is a Dutch professional footballer who plays as a midfielder for USL League One club Westchester SC.

== Career ==
=== Early career ===
Born in Amsterdam, Guezen played in the youth departments of AFC, Ajax, ASV De Dijk and IVV before returning to AFC and subsequently moving to Feyenoord. As part of the Feyenoord youth academy, he stated in July 2015 that "Ajax was in his heart", and that he would have preferred to play in their youth academy; a controversial comment as the club is considered to be Feyenoord's fierce rivals. He afterwards played in the youth academy of ADO Den Haag, before leaving in 2018. Guezen then played shortly for Team VVCS in the summer break, a football team consisting of free agent players. His performances there earned him a contract at SC Cambuur, where he appeared at their under-21 team.

=== TOP Oss ===
In August 2020, Guezen signed a one-year contract with TOP Oss, coming over as a free agent from the Cambuur U21 team. He made his professional debut on 29 August, in a 2–1 home loss to Helmond Sport, coming on as a substitute for Cas Peters in the 68th minute.

=== PEC Zwolle ===
In August 2022, Guezen joined recently relegated Eerste Divisie club PEC Zwolle after a successful trial, signing an amateur contract. On 7 October, he made his debut for the club, replacing Davy van den Berg in the 78th minute of a 3–0 league loss against Dordrecht.

=== Zagłębie Sosnowiec ===
On 4 March 2023, it was announced that Guezen had joined Polish I liga club Zagłębie Sosnowiec on a one-year contract. He made his debut for the club that same day, in a 1–0 away loss against GKS Tychy, coming on as a 69th-minute substitute for Adrian Troć. On 12 March, he earned his first starting position for Sosnowiec, playing 56 minutes of a 1–0 home defeat against Skra Częstochowa. After Zagłębie finished the 2023–24 season in last, Guezen left the club by mutual consent on 10 June 2024.

=== Westchester SC ===
Guezen joined USL League One expansion club Westchester SC on 3 January 2025, alongside fellow Dutch-born players Koen Blommestijn and Daniel Bouman.
