= Tim Timchenko =

Russian-Ukrainian soccer player (born 2002)

Personal information
- Date of birth: August 28, 2002 (age 24)
- Place of birth: Moscow, Russia
- Height: 6 ft 2 in (1.88 m)
- Positions: Centre-back; defensive midfielder

Team information
- Current team: Westchester SC
- Number: 5

Youth career
- Dynamo Moscow
- 2021: New York Red Bulls Academy

College career
Years	Team	Apps	(Gls)
2021–2024	Iona Gaels	65	(2)

Senior career*
Years	Team	Apps	(Gls)
2022–2025	Reading United AC	31	(2)
2026–	Westchester SC	28	(2)
- * Club domestic league appearances and goals

Timofey Igorevich Timchenko (Russian: Тимофей Игоревич Тимченко; born August 28, 2002), commonly known as Tim Timchenko, is a professional soccer player who plays as a centre-back and defensive midfielder for Westchester SC in USL League One. Born in Moscow, Russia, and raised in Kyiv, Ukraine, he holds dual Russian and Ukrainian citizenship.

== Career ==
=== Early life and youth career ===
Timchenko was born in Moscow, Russia, to Igor Timchenko and grew up in Kyiv, Ukraine. He began his youth development in the academy system of Dynamo Moscow. After relocating to the United States, he attended High Mowing School in New Hampshire and Pioneer Academy in New Jersey.

In April 2021, Timchenko joined the New York Red Bulls Academy U-19 squad and was also featured on the roster for the club's reserve side, New York Red Bulls II.

=== College and amateur career ===
Timchenko played four seasons of NCAA Division I college soccer at Iona University between 2021 and 2024, making 65 appearances (63 starts) and recording two goals and six assists.

During his collegiate summers, Timchenko competed in USL League Two with Reading United AC. In 2024, he served as team captain, led the squad in minutes played, and was named Reading United's Defensive Player of the Year before returning to the club for the 2025 season.

=== Westchester SC ===
On January 24, 2026, Timchenko signed his first professional contract with USL League One side Westchester SC ahead of the 2026 season. Wearing number 5, he became a regular starter in central defense for the Mount Vernon-based club.

In August 2026, Timchenko earned USL League One Team of the Week accolades after recording eight clearances, a 90% passing accuracy rate, and an assist in a 3–2 victory over FC Naples. Four days later, on August 22, 2026, he scored his first professional goal, opening the scoring in the 24th minute of an away match against Corpus Christi.

On September 16, 2026, Timchenko scored his second professional goal via a free kick to spark a five-goal first-half run in Westchester's 5–2 home win over the Richmond Kickers at The Stadium at Memorial Field. The strike earned him a nomination for USL League One Fans' Choice Goal of the Week for Week 29.

== Coaching career ==
Following the completion of his undergraduate studies at Iona in 2025, Timchenko briefly served as a graduate assistant coach for the men's soccer program at Marymount University in Arlington, Virginia, prior to signing professionally with Westchester SC.

== Career statistics ==
=== Club ===
As of 25 October 2026

Appearances and goals by club, season and competition
Club	Season	League			National cup (Note: Includes U.S. Open Cup)		Other (Note: Includes USL Cup)		Total	
Club	Season	Division	Apps	Goals	Apps	Goals	Apps	Goals	Apps	Goals
Reading United AC	2022	USL League Two	9	0	—	—	—	—	9	0
Reading United AC	2023	USL League Two	—	—	—	—	—	—	—	—
Reading United AC	2024	USL League Two	13	1	—	—	—	—	13	1
Reading United AC	2025	USL League Two	9	1	—	—	—	—	9	1
Total			31	2	0	0	0	0	31	2
Westchester SC	2026	USL League One	28	2	1	0	2	0	31	2
Career total			59	4	1	0	2	0	62	4

== Honors ==
Iona Gaels

- MAAC Tournament Champion: 2024

Individual

- MAAC Defensive Player of the Year: 2023, 2024
- All-MAAC First Team: 2023, 2024
- All-MAAC Second Team: 2022
- All-ECAC First Team: 2024
- All-ECAC Second Team: 2023
- MAAC All-Championship Team: 2023, 2024
- Reading United AC Defensive Player of the Year: 2024
