= Westchester SC =

- Full name: Westchester Soccer Club
- Founded: May 9, 2024; 2 years ago
- Ground: The Stadium at Memorial Field
- Capacity: 3,900
- Head coach: George Gjokaj
- 2026: USL League One, 10th of 17
- Website: westchestersc.com
Home colors	Away colors

Westchester SC is an American professional soccer team based in Westchester County, New York. First announced in 2024, the team began play in USL League One for the 2025 season. The team plays at The Stadium at Memorial Field in Mount Vernon.

== History ==
On May 9, 2024, it was announced that Westchester, New York, had been granted a USL League One franchise, set to start playing in 2025.

In June 2024, New York Jets quarterback Tyrod Taylor joined the club's ownership group. The team unveiled their badge and opened season ticket deposits later that month. On August 22, 2024, the first head coach in the club's history was announced as Dave Carton. Carton was formerly the Technical Director of fellow USL League One side Charlotte Independence. Their first sponsor was also announced as Northwell Health.

Westchester SC made their on-field debut on March 8, 2025, a 1–1 draw against Greenville Triumph SC at Paladin Stadium. On March 18, Westchester won the first game in club history, defeating FC Motown in the 2025 U.S. Open Cup. Westchester SC finished their inaugural season with a record of 5–9–16, last place in USL League One, though striker Juan Carlos Obregón won League One's Golden Boot with 17 goals. On November 3, the club announced that head coach Dave Carton, as well as the entire technical staff, had been dismissed. He was replaced by George Gjokaj.

On October 25, 2026, reports emerged that the club would depart League One. There has not been an official confirmation from the club or the USL on the subject.

== Roster ==
As of November 3, 2026

Note: Flags indicate national team as defined under FIFA eligibility rules; some limited exceptions apply. Players may hold more than one non-FIFA nationality.

No.	Pos.	Nation	Player
1	GK	USA	Andrew Hammersley
2	DF	USA	Maximus Jennings
3	DF	ENG	Charlie Dickerson
4	DF	USA	Bobby Pierre
5	DF	UKR	Tim Timchenko
6	MF	USA	Conor McGlynn
7	FW	TTO	Samory Powder
8	MF	AUS	Daniel Bouman
9	MF	NED	Koen Blommestijn
10	MF	NED	Dean Guezen
11	MF	ESA	Bryan Vásquez
14	DF	USA	Jack Loura
15	MF	USA	Aidan Borra
16	GK	USA	Giuliano Santucci

No.	Pos.	Nation	Player
17	MF	USA	Miguel Diaz
18	FW	USA	Ermin Mačkić
21	DF	USA	Aleksei Armas
23	GK	ARG	Matias Molina
24	MF	USA	Piero Elias
27	MF	MEX	Jonathan Jiménez
40	DF	USA	Mo Williams
47	MF	USA	Colin Veltri
66	DF	TTO	Noah Powder
77	FW	USA	Daniel Burko
78	FW	USA	Marko Vislocky
83	MF	USA	Kyle Evans
99	GK	ITA	Luca Marinelli

== Stadium ==
Westchester SC play their home matches at The Stadium at Memorial Field. The Stadium is a multi-purpose stadium located in Mount Vernon, New York that was opened in 1931, renovated in 2022, and has a capacity of 3,900. The club shares the stadium with Mount Vernon High School, as well as the Monroe University football team.
