= Maximus Jennings =

American soccer player (born 2002)

Max Jennings
Personal information
- Date of birth: May 15, 2002 (age 24)
- Place of birth: Montclair, New Jersey, United States
- Height: 6 ft 0 in (1.83 m)
- Positions: Right-back; centre-back

Team information
- Current team: Westchester SC

Youth career
- 2018–2019: Cedar Stars Academy – Bergen
- 2020–2021: New York Soccer Club

College career
Years	Team	Apps	(Gls)
2021–2024	Georgetown Hoyas	56	(6)

Senior career*
Years	Team	Apps	(Gls)
2025	Real Monarchs	24	(2)
2026–	Westchester SC	31	(1)
- * Club domestic league appearances and goals

Maximus Jennings (born May 15, 2002), commonly known as Max Jennings, is an American professional soccer player who plays as a right-back and centre-back for Westchester SC in USL League One.

== Career ==
=== Early life and youth career ===
Jennings was born and raised in Montclair, New Jersey, and has four siblings, including sisters Kayla and Jillian, who played collegiate soccer at Boston College. He initially attended Montclair High School before transferring as a sophomore to The Hotchkiss School in Lakeville, Connecticut, where he competed in soccer, football, lacrosse, and indoor track. At Hotchkiss, he earned WNEPSSA All-Star and Founders League Best XI honors. At the youth club level, he played for Cedar Stars Academy – Bergen and New York Soccer Club.

=== College career ===
Jennings played NCAA Division I college soccer at Georgetown University between 2021 and 2024. After redshirting his freshman season in 2021, he broke into the starting lineup in 2022, making 16 appearances (14 starts) and being named the team's Most Improved Player. In 2023, he started all 19 matches he played, recording five goals and one assist while earning BIG EAST Defensive Player of the Week and BIG EAST All-Academic honors.

On December 19, 2023, Jennings was selected in the third round (76th overall) of the 2024 MLS SuperDraft by Real Salt Lake. Selected under rules permitting underclassmen to retain collegiate eligibility, he returned to Georgetown to complete his degree during the 2024 season.

=== Professional ===
==== Real Monarchs ====
Following his graduation from Georgetown, Jennings signed with Real Monarchs, the reserve side of Real Salt Lake competing in MLS NEXT Pro, for the 2025 season. During the 2025 campaign, he made 24 league appearances (12 starts) and scored two goals.

==== Westchester SC ====
On January 26, 2026, Jennings signed with USL League One side Westchester SC ahead of the 2026 season, becoming the club's first inbound signing with prior professional experience for the campaign. He quickly established himself as a regular starter along the back line for the Mount Vernon-based club, featuring at both right-back and centre-back.

During the summer of 2026, Jennings recorded a goal contribution in six of eleven USL League One matches, tallying one goal and four assists, in addition to scoring Westchester's lone goal against Hartford Athletic in USL Cup play. He also scored one goal across three appearances in the 2026 U.S. Open Cup.

== Career statistics ==
=== Club ===
As of 25 October 2026

Appearances and goals by club, season and competition
Club	Season	League			National cup (Note: Includes U.S. Open Cup)		Other (Note: Includes USL Cup)		Total	
Club	Season	Division	Apps	Goals	Apps	Goals	Apps	Goals	Apps	Goals
Real Monarchs	2025	MLS NEXT Pro	24	2	—	—	—	—	24	2
Westchester SC	2026	USL League One	31	1	3	1	3	1	37	3
Career total			55	3	3	1	3	1	61	5
