= Løvenstad =

Coordinates: 59°56′14″N 11°01′35″E

- Village
- Location in Akershus
- Country: Norway
- Region: Østlandet
- County: Akershus
- Time zone: UTC+01:00 (CET)
  - Summer (DST): UTC+02:00 (CEST)

Løvenstad is a village in Rælingen, Akershus, Norway.
