= Samory Powder =

Trinidadian footballer (born 2001)

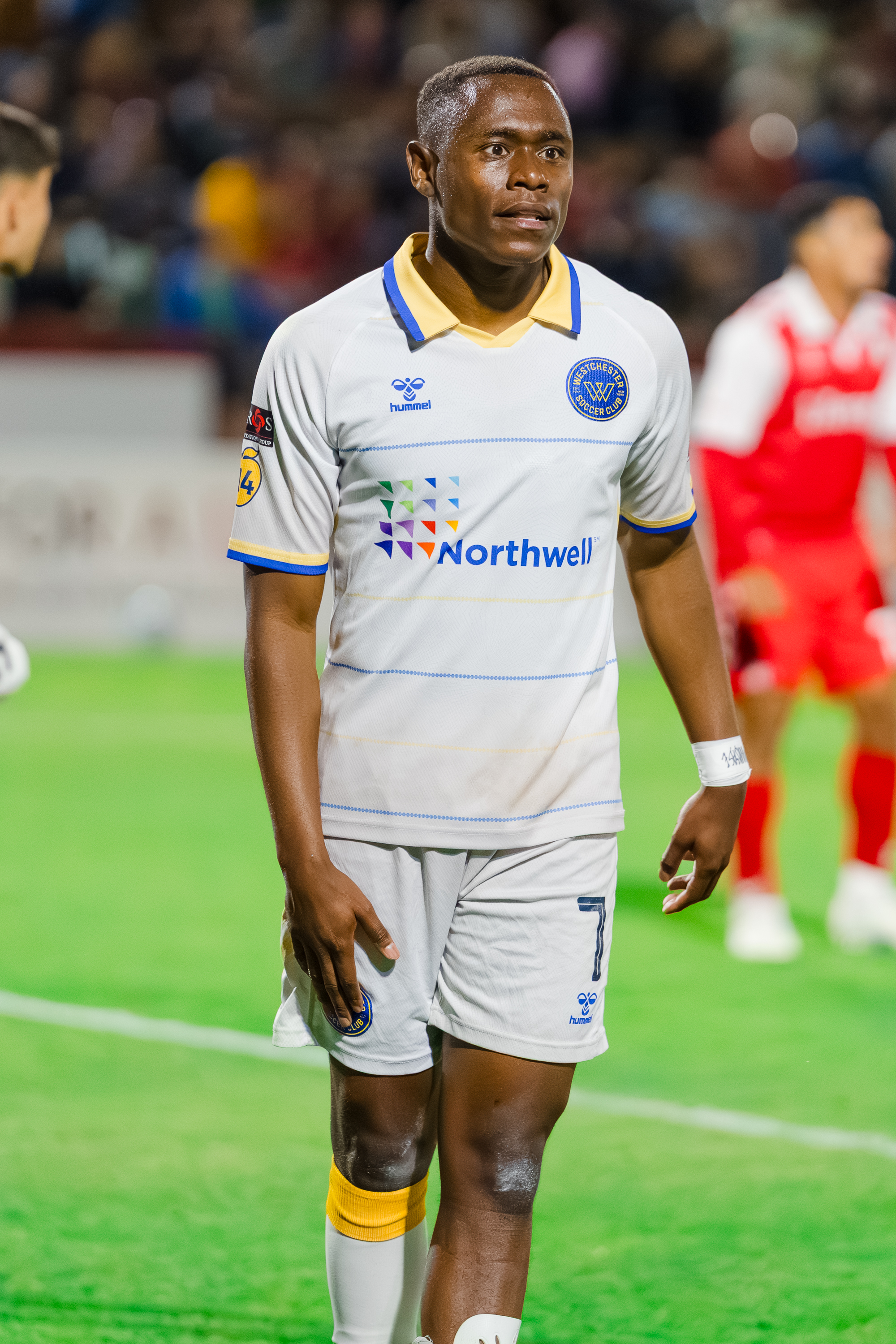
- Powder with Westchester SC in 2026

Personal information
- Date of birth: 7 March 2001 (age 25)
- Place of birth: Edison, New Jersey, United States
- Height: 1.83 m (6 ft 0 in)
- Positions: Full-back; winger

Team information
- Current team: Westchester SC
- Number: 7

Youth career
- 2015–2016: New York Red Bulls Academy
- 2016–2018: Players Development Academy
- 2018–2019: Portland Timbers Academy

College career
Years	Team	Apps	(Gls)
2020–2023	Detroit Mercy Titans	38	(17)
2023	Portland Pilots	10	(6)

Senior career*
Years	Team	Apps	(Gls)
2022–2024	Hudson Valley Hammers		
2025–	Westchester SC	46	(2)
- * Club domestic league appearances and goals as of 24 October 2026

Samory Powder (born 7 March 2001) is a professional footballer who plays as a full-back and winger for Westchester SC in USL League One. Born in the United States he represented the Trinidad and Tobago national team.

== Early life ==
Samory Powder in Edison, New Jersey, on 7 March 2001, to Lester Lewis Powder and Clair Emmanuel.

== Youth career ==
Like his brother Noah, he started his youth career playing for the New York Red Bulls Academy, and started his career playing for their U14 team.

In August 2016, the Red Bulls sold him to the Players Development Academy and played in their U15 and U16 teams. By 2018, Powder was playing for the Portland Timbers Academy.

== Career ==
Powder started his college career playing for the Detroit Mercy Titans. While with the Titans, he appeared in 38 games and scored 10 goals across his three seasons.

In the summer of 2023, Powder moved to the Portland Pilots. With the Portland Pilots, he played 10 games and scored six goals in the 2023 season, which was his only full season there.

On 1 August 2022, Powder signed an academy contract to join the Hudson Valley Hammers in USL League Two. He would also play for the club in the 2023 and 2024 seasons respectively.

On 23 December 2024, Powder joined USL League One expansion club,Westchester SC. On 8 March 2025, he made his debut for Westchester in 1–1 draw against Greenville Triumph.

He would get his first goal contribution assisting a goal for Tobi Adewole in a 1–3 win against Texoma FC which was also another expansion club. On 14 April 2025, Powder scored his first goal in a 4–4 draw against the Richmond Kickers. Powder scored in a 3–1 loss against Spokane Velocity. He ended his first season at Westchester, by making 26 appearances and scoring two goals.

== International career ==
Like his brother, Powder is eligible to play for the US, through birth, or Trinidad and Tobago, through his father, internationally.

Powder received his first ever called up by the Trinidad and Tobago national football team in March 2022 for the friendlies against Barbados and Guyana, however he ended up being on the bench for both of those games.

In June 2023, he was called up for the international friendly against Guatemala, and was on the bench again.

== Personal life ==
Samory Powder has two brothers Noah and Seth. Noah also plays for Westchester SC alongside him.
