= Miguel Díaz =

Miguel Díaz may refer to:

== People ==
- Miguel Díaz (boxing) (born 1938), Argentine boxing trainer
- Miguel Chacón Díaz (1930–2011), Spanish professional racing cyclist
- Miguel Díaz (Salvadoran footballer) (born 1957), Salvadorian football player
- Miguel Díaz-Canel (born 1960), Cuban politician
- Miguel "Angá" Díaz (1961–2006), Cuban percussionist
- Miguel H. Díaz (born 1963), American theologian and diplomat
- Miguel Díaz de la Portilla (born 1963), American lawyer and politician
- Miguel Díaz (Spanish footballer) (born 1994), Spanish footballer
- Miguel Díaz (baseball) (born 1994), Dominican Republic baseball player

== Fiction ==
- Miguel Diaz (character), in the television series Cobra Kai, in the Karate Kid franchise

== See also ==
- Miguel Dias (born 1968), Dutch boxer
- Miguel Torres Díaz, Puerto Rican civil engineer
