= Daniel Burko =

Norwegian soccer player (born 2002)

Personal information
- Date of birth: 17 September 2002 (age 24)
- Place of birth: Løvenstad, Norway
- Height: 1.91 m (6 ft 3 in)
- Position: Forward

Team information
- Current team: Westchester SC
- Number: 77

Youth career
- 2014–2021: Rælingen FK

College career
Years	Team	Apps	(Gls)
2021–2022	Waldorf Warriors	13	(9)
2023	Lincoln Memorial Railsplitters	19	(20)
2024	Syracuse Orange	16	(3)
2025	Hofstra Pride	20	(13)

Senior career*
Years	Team	Apps	(Gls)
2019–2021	Rælingen FK	14	(3)
2024–2025	Little Rock Rangers	3	(2)
2024	Ballard FC	7	(3)
2026–	Westchester SC	28	(3)
- * Club domestic league appearances and goals as of 18 November 2026

Daniel Burko (born 17 September 2002) is a Norwegian professional soccer player who plays as a forward for Westchester SC in USL League One.

== Early life and youth career ==
Burko was born in Løvenstad, Norway, and is of Ukrainian heritage. He attended Lørenskog videregående skole, where he studied general sciences and mathematics.

At club level, Burko developed in the youth ranks of Rælingen FK between 2014 and 2021, recording 43 goals in 174 youth appearances. He also featured for Rælingen's senior side in the 4. divisjon, scoring three goals across 14 senior league and cup matches.

== College career ==
=== Waldorf University (2021–2022) ===
In 2021, Burko moved to the United States to play NAIA soccer for Waldorf University in Forest City, Iowa. As a freshman, he started 12 of 13 matches, recording nine goals and six assists (24 points), including a hat-trick in his second collegiate game. He received Continental Athletic Conference (CAC) Honorable Mention and Academic All-Conference honors in 2021, and earned Second Team All-CAC recognition as a sophomore in 2022. Burko also competed on Waldorf's indoor and outdoor track and field teams in 2022, earning North Star Athletic Association (NSAA) All-Conference honors.

=== Lincoln Memorial University (2023) ===
Burko transferred to NCAA Division II side Lincoln Memorial University for the 2023 season. He started 17 of 19 matches for the Railsplitters, scoring 20 goals and adding three assists (43 points). At the conclusion of the season, he was named the South Atlantic Conference (SAC) Offensive Player of the Year, All-SAC First Team, and the D2CCA Southeast Region Player of the Year.

=== Syracuse University (2024) ===
Moving up to NCAA Division I in 2024, Burko joined Syracuse University, where he graduated with a degree in economics. He appeared in 16 matches (eight starts) for the Orange, scoring three goals and earning Atlantic Coast Conference (ACC) Co-Offensive Player of the Week honors during the season.

=== Hofstra University (2025) ===
Burko played his final collegiate season in 2025 at Hofstra University while pursuing a master's degree in finance. Starting all 20 matches for the Pride, he scored 13 goals and notched five assists (31 points), ranking second in the Coastal Athletic Association (CAA) in both goals and total points. He was named CAA Offensive Player of the Week in November 2025 and collected First Team All-CAA and First Team All-Atlantic Region accolades at year's end.

== Club career ==
=== USL League Two ===
During his collegiate off-seasons, Burko competed in USL League Two. In 2024, he split time between the Little Rock Rangers—where he scored five league goals and added one goal in two U.S. Open Cup appearances—and Ballard FC, where he tallied three regular-season goals. He returned to the Little Rock Rangers in 2025, making a U.S. Open Cup appearance against Birmingham Legion FC.

=== Westchester SC ===
On 22 January 2026, Burko signed his first professional contract with USL League One club Westchester SC, taking squad number 77. Burko scored his first professional goal for Westchester SC on March 19, 2026, converting a 34th-minute penalty kick before adding a second goal in a 2–0 U.S. Open Cup first-round victory over New York Renegades FC. He would score twice in three U.S. Open Cup matches and added a goal and an assist across four USL Cup appearances. Burko scored his first USL League One goal on June 14, 2026, netting a second-half stoppage-time goal in a 4–0 home victory over Greenville Triumph SC.In league play, Burko appeared in 29 regular-season matches, scoring three goals and providing six assists. Following a strong finish to the regular season, he was named to the final USL League One Team of the Week and was voted USL League One Player of the Month for October 2026.

== Career statistics ==
=== Club ===
As of 18 November 2026

Appearances and goals by club, season and competition
Club	Season	League			National cup (Note: Includes Norwegian Football Cup and U.S. Open Cup)		League cup (Note: Includes USL Cup)		Total	
Club	Season	Division	Apps	Goals	Apps	Goals	Apps	Goals	Apps	Goals
Rælingen FK	2019	4. divisjon	1	0	0	0	—	—	1	0
Rælingen FK	2020	4. divisjon	0	0	0	0	—	—	0	0
Rælingen FK	2021	4. divisjon	12	3	1	0	—	—	13	3
Rælingen FK	Total		13	3	1	0	—	—	14	3
Little Rock Rangers	2024	USL League Two	3	2	2	1	—	—	5	3
Ballard FC	2024	USL League Two	7	3	0	0	—	—	7	3
Little Rock Rangers	2025	USL League Two	—	—	1	0	—	—	1	0
Westchester SC	2026	USL League One	28	3	3	2	4	1	35	6
Career total			51	11	7	3	4	1	62	13

=== College ===
Appearances and goals by college, season and competition
School	Season	Division	Apps	Starts	Goals	Assists	Points
Waldorf	2021	NAIA	13	12	9	6	24
Lincoln Memorial	2023	NCAA Division II	19	17	20	3	43
Syracuse	2024	NCAA Division I	16	8	3	0	6
Hofstra	2025	NCAA Division I	20	20	13	5	31
Career total			68	57	45	14	104

== Honors ==
Individual

- USL League One Player of the Month: October 2026
- First Team All-Atlantic Region: 2025
- First Team All-CAA: 2025
- D2CCA Southeast Region Player of the Year: 2023
- South Atlantic Conference Offensive Player of the Year: 2023
- First Team All-SAC: 2023
- Second Team All-CAC: 2022
