= Jonathan Jiménez (footballer, born 2001) =

Mexican footballer (born 2001)

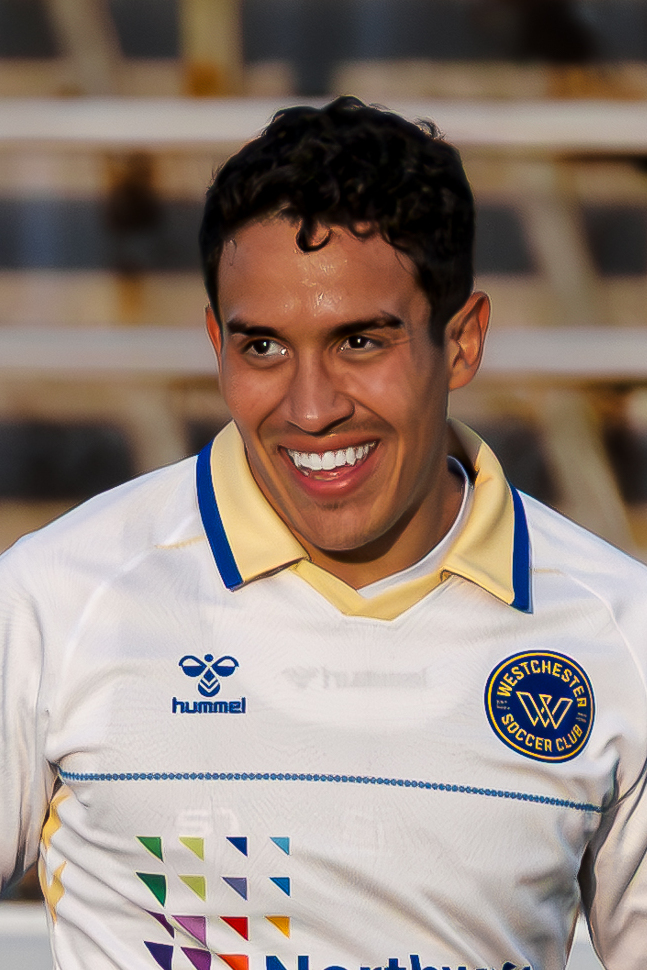
- Jiménez with Westchester SC in 2026

Personal information
- Full name: Jonathan Jiménez Vargas
- Date of birth: 25 April 2001 (age 25)
- Place of birth: Jiquilpan, Michoacan, Mexico
- Height: 5 ft 10 in (1.78 m)
- Position: Right winger

Team information
- Current team: Westchester SC
- Number: 27

Youth career
- 2017-2019: New York City FC

College career
Years	Team	Apps	(Gls)
2019–2021	North Carolina Tarheels	49	(4)

Senior career*
Years	Team	Apps	(Gls)
2022–2024	New York City FC	0	(0)
2022–2025	New York City FC II	70	(23)
2025	Hartford Athletic	26	(2)
2026–	Westchester SC	30	(7)
- * Club domestic league appearances and goals as of 24 October 2026

Jonathan Jiménez Vargas (born 25 April 2001) is a Mexican professional footballer who plays as a right winger for USL League One club Westchester.

== Club career ==
=== Youth, college and amateur ===
Born in Jiquilpan, Michoacan, Mexico, Jiménez began his career in the youth ranks of New York City FC and played college soccer for the North Carolina Tar Heels. He played three seasons with the Tarheels, making 49 appearances and scoring 4 goals and recording 4 assists.

=== New York City FC ===
Jiménez signed his first contract with City's first team in January 2022. That year, he began his career in the MLS Next Pro reserve team, New York City FC II. On 2 July 2022, Jiménez scored his first goal as a professional in a 4-1 victory over FC Cincinnati 2. On 2 April 2024, Jiménez scored his first hat trick for NYCFC II in a 4–2 2024 U.S. Open Cup Second Round victory over New York Red Bulls II at Belson Stadium.

=== Hartford Athletic ===
Jiménez joined USL Championship club Hartford Athletic on 16 December 2024. Jiménez scored his first goal for the club on 12 July 2025, netting the opening goal in the fifth minute of a 2–1 road victory over Detroit City FC. On 11 October 2025, Jiménez scored a stoppage-time game-winning goal in a 3–2 victory over Sacramento Republic FC to clinch a USL Championship playoff berth for Hartford Athletic.

=== Westchester SC ===
Jiménez signed with USL League One side Westchester SC on 5 March 2026. Jiménez scored his first goal with Westchester SC on April 4, 2026, finding the net in a 5–1 USL League One victory over Corpus Christi FC. On June 19, 2026, Jiménez recorded a second-half brace in a 5–1 win over Portland Hearts of Pine, earning USL League One Player of the Week recognition. He added another brace on September 16, 2026, scoring twice in two minutes during a 5–2 defeat of the Richmond Kickers. Jiménez finished the 2026 campaign with 7 goals in 30 league appearances.

== Career statistics ==
=== Club ===
As of 18 November 2026

Appearances and goals by club, season and competition
Club	Season	League			National cup (Note: Includes U.S. Open Cup)		League cup (Note: Includes USL Cup)		Other		Total	
Club	Season	Division	Apps	Goals	Apps	Goals	Apps	Goals	Apps	Goals	Apps	Goals
New York City FC	2022	MLS	0	0	0	0	—	—	0	0	0	0
New York City FC	2023	MLS	0	0	0	0	0	0	—	—	0	0
New York City FC	2024	MLS	0	0	—	—	0	0	—	—	0	0
New York City FC	Total		0	0	0	0	0	0	0	0	0	0
New York City FC II	2022	MLS Next Pro	19	10	—	—	—	—	—	—	19	10
New York City FC II	2023	MLS Next Pro	27	8	—	—	—	—	—	—	27	8
New York City FC II	2024	MLS Next Pro	24	5	4	4	—	—	1 (Note: Appearance in MLS Next Pro playoffs)	0	29	9
New York City FC II	Total		70	23	4	4	—	—	1	0	75	27
Hartford Athletic	2025	USL Championship	27	2	2	0	5	0	0	0	34	2
Westchester SC	2026	USL League One	30	7	3	0	3	0	—	—	36	7
Career total			127	32	9	4	8	0	1	0	145	36

== Honours ==
Hartford Athletic • USL Cup: 2025
