= Daniel Bouman =

Australian soccer player (born 1998)

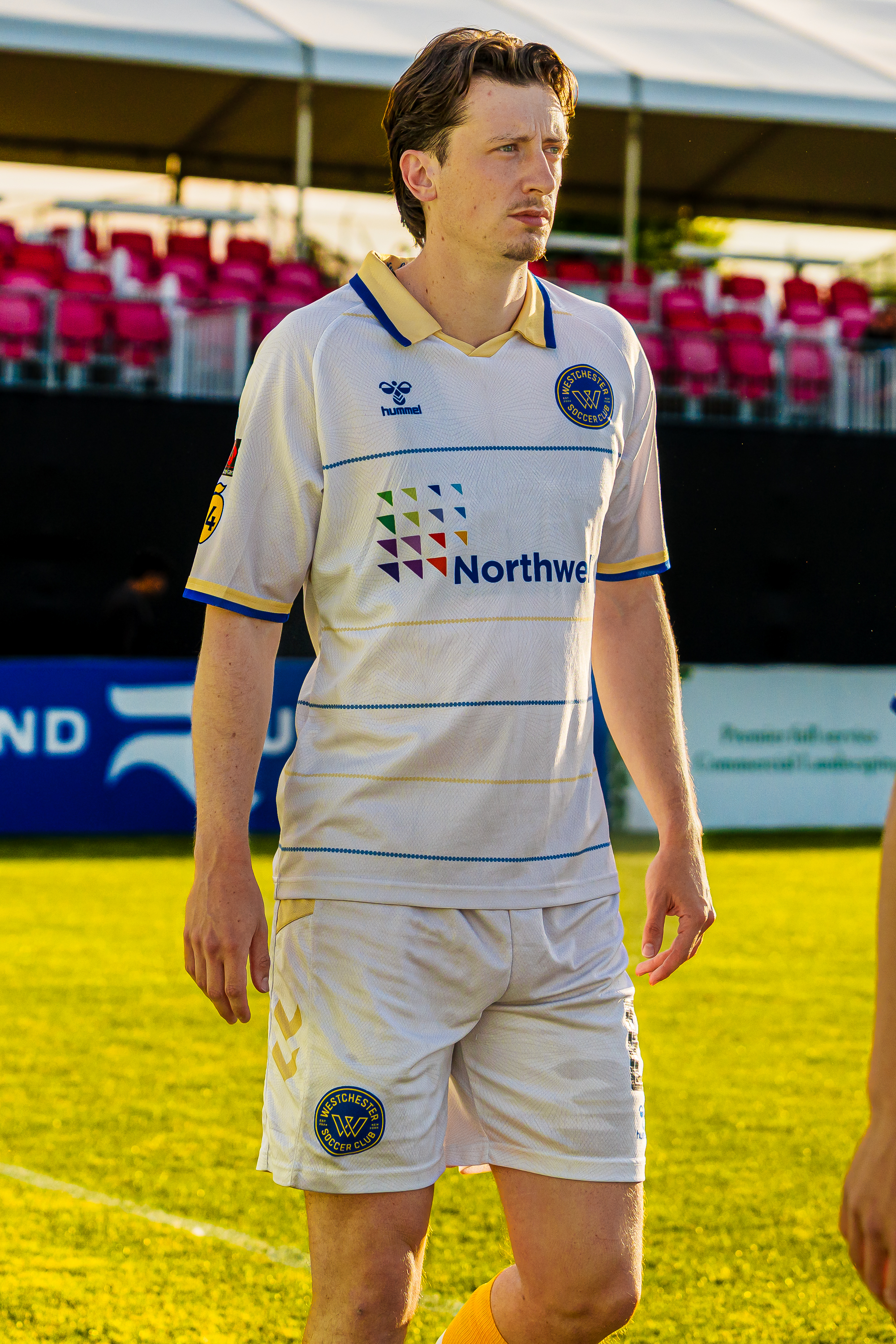
- Bouman with Westchester SC in 2026

Personal information
- Full name: Daniel Bouman
- Date of birth: 7 February 1998 (age 28)
- Place of birth: Blaricum, The Netherlands
- Height: 1.89 m (6 ft 2 in)
- Position: Midfielder

Team information
- Current team: Westchester SC
- Number: 8

Youth career
- GHFA Spirit
- Manly United
- Blacktown City
- 2014–2019: FC Groningen
- 2019–2020: SC Cambuur

Senior career*
Years	Team	Apps	(Gls)
2017–2019	Jong Groningen	39	(11)
2019–2020	SC Cambuur	0	(0)
2020	CCM Academy	1	(0)
2020–2021	Central Coast Mariners	26	(0)
2022	Kavala	6	(0)
2023–2024	Marconi Stallions	58	(5)
2025–	Westchester SC	57	(2)

International career^{‡}
2019–2020	Australia U23	7	(2)
Medal record
Representing Australia
Men's Association football
AFC U-23 Asian Cup
Third place	2020 Thailand
- * Club domestic league appearances and goals as of 31 October 2026 ‡ National team caps and goals as of 30 July 2021

Daniel Bouman (born 7 February 1998) is a soccer player who plays as a midfielder for Westchester SC in USL League One. Born in the Netherlands, he has represented Australia at youth level.

== Club career ==
=== Youth ===
Bouman was born in the Netherlands to a Dutch father and Australian mother and moved to Sydney at the age of four. When his family relocated back to the Netherlands in 2014, he joined FC Groningen as a youth player, after playing as a junior in Australia for GHFA Spirit, Manly United, and Blacktown City. In 2019, he caught the eye after scoring eight goals in 15 appearances with Groningen's under-23 side. During his time at Groningen, he played nearly 100 games for the youth sides.

=== SC Cambuur ===
In May 2019, Bouman joined SC Cambuur's senior team. During his time at the club, he played 11 games for the under-21 side and wasn't capped by the senior side. At the end of the season, he left the club due to him being out of contract and not being re-signed after the club was denied promotion to the Eredivise, due to the season being abandoned because of the COVID-19 pandemic.

=== Central Coast Mariners ===
In October 2020, Bouman returned to Australia, signing a one-year contract with Central Coast Mariners ahead of the 2020–21 A-League season following trialling with them during the pre-season.

=== Westchester SC ===
In January 2025, Bouman joined expansion club Westchester SC ahead of their inaugural season

== International career ==
Bouman was selected by Graham Arnold for Australia's under-23 side who competed in the 2020 AFC U-23 Championship, which doubled as qualifiers for the 2020 Olympics. In the tournament, he played in five out of the six matches and helped Australia qualify for the 2020 Olympics.

== Honours ==
Australia U-23

- AFC U-23 Asian Cup: 3rd place 2020
