= Omar Hernandez (soccer) =

American soccer player (born 2001)

Personal information
- Full name: Omar Hernandez
- Date of birth: May 4, 2001 (age 25)
- Place of birth: Dalton, Georgia
- Height: 5 ft 11 in (1.80 m)
- Position: Midfielder

Team information
- Current team: Chattanooga Red Wolves
- Number: 7

Youth career
- 2015–2018: Chattanooga FC
- 2016–2019: Dalton Catamounts
- 2018–2019: Atlanta United

College career
Years	Team	Apps	(Gls)
2019–2022	Wake Forest Demon Deacons	70	(13)
2023	Mercer Bears	18	(3)

Senior career*
Years	Team	Apps	(Gls)
2019	Dalton Red Wolves	6	(1)
2024–	Chattanooga Red Wolves	81	(19)
- * Club domestic league appearances and goals as of October 31, 2026

Omar Hernandez (born May 4, 2001) is an American soccer player who plays for Chattanooga Red Wolves in USL League One.

Hernandez was the 2019 recipient of Gatorade Player of the Year award for boys' soccer. The award is a nationally recognized honor given to the best high school athlete in the United States.

== Career ==
=== Youth and college ===
Hernandez was listed as a three-star recruit by Top Drawer Soccer, and ultimately signed a National Letter of Intent with Wake Forest University in April 2018, ahead of his senior year. Hernandez rejected offers to play for South Carolina, SMU, UCF, South Florida, East Tennessee State, and High Point.

During his senior year of high school, Hernandez transferred from the Chattanooga FC Academy to the Atlanta United FC Academy. In high school soccer, Hernandez captained the team to a 23-0-0 record and to the Georgia State 6A Boys' Soccer Championship, as well as the #1 high school ranking in the nation by USA Today. On June 11, 2019, he received the Gatorade Player of the Year for boys' soccer for being recognized as the best boy's high school soccer player in the United States.

On August 30, 2019, Hernandez made his collegiate debut for Wake Forest, playing 17 minutes in a 2–1 victory against UCF. Hernandez made his first assist for Wake Forest on September 6, 2019, in a 3–1 win against Dartmouth, three days before his first start for Wake Forest, in a 4–0 win against Houston Baptist.

Hernandez would finish his career at Wake Forest with 70 appearances and 13 goals. Ahead of the 2023 NCAA Division I men's soccer season, Hernandez was a graduate transfer to Mercer University. At Mercer, he made 18 appearances, scoring three goals.

=== Senior ===
During the 2019 USL League Two season, Hernandez played with the Dalton Red Wolves, the reserve team of Chattanooga Red Wolves. He appeared six matches, scoring one goal.

Hernandez signed his first professional contract in January 2024, joining the Chattanooga Red Wolves of USL League One.
