= Conor McGlynn =

American soccer player (born 1998)

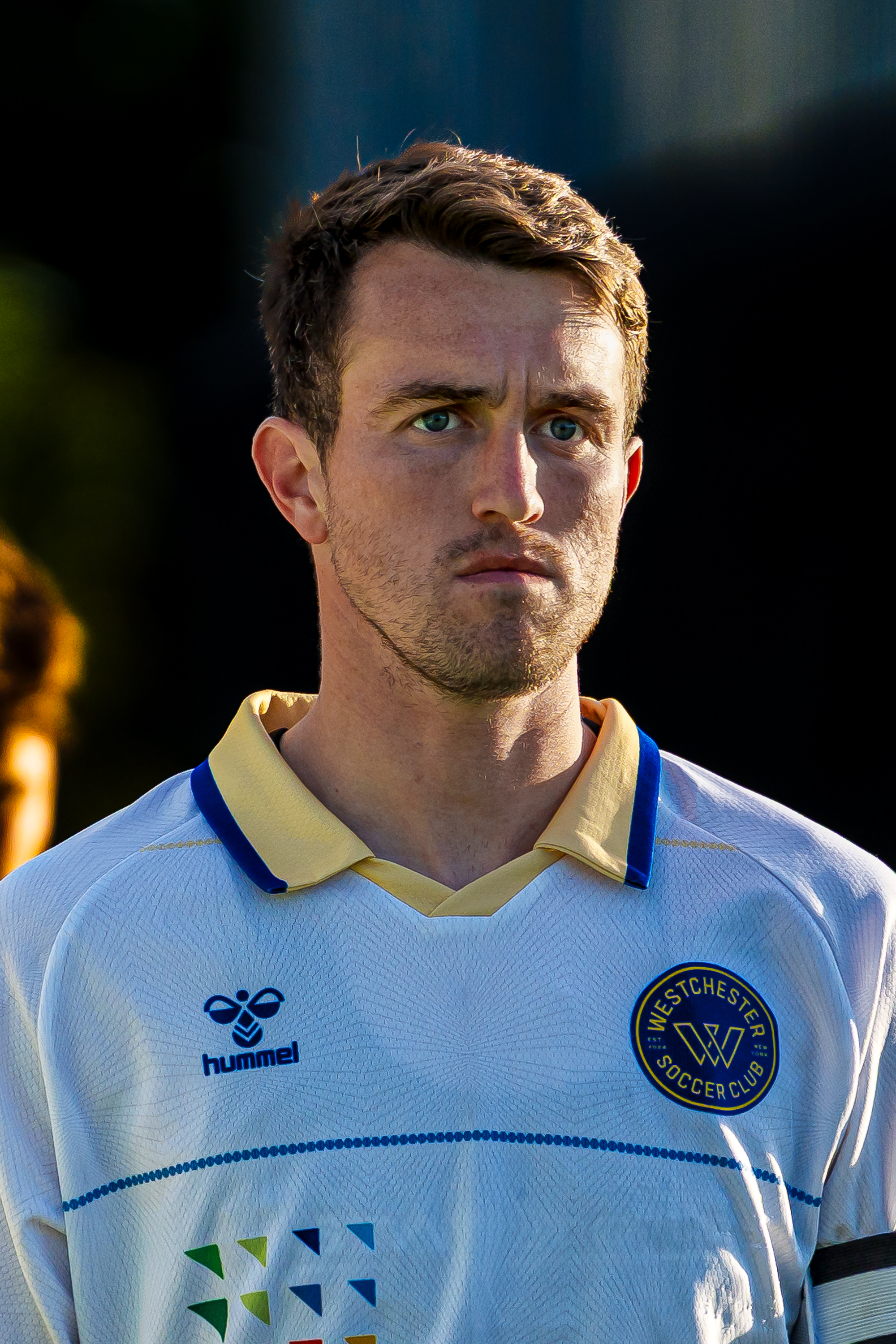
- McGlynn with Westchester SC in 2026

Personal information
- Date of birth: November 20, 1998 (age 27)
- Place of birth: Middle Village, New York, United States
- Height: 6 ft 4 in (1.93 m)
- Position: Midfielder

Team information
- Current team: Westchester SC
- Number: 6

Youth career
- 2015–2016: BW Gottschee

College career
Years	Team	Apps	(Gls)
2016–2019	Siena Saints	75	(7)

Senior career*
Years	Team	Apps	(Gls)
2017–2019	FA Euro New York	33	(7)
2020–2023	Hartford Athletic	99	(9)
2024	Rhode Island FC	14	(1)
2025–	Westchester SC	52	(20)
- * Club domestic league appearances and goals as of October 24, 2026

Conor McGlynn (born November 20, 1998) is an American professional soccer player who plays as a midfielder for USL League One side Westchester SC.

== Career ==
=== Youth, college and amateur ===
McGlynn played for the New York-based BW Gottschee Academy from 2012 to 2016.

McGlynn spent all four years of his college soccer career at Siena College between 2016 and 2019, where he made 75 appearances, scored 7 goals and tallied 16 assists.

While at college, McGlynn also played soccer with USL League Two side FA Euro New York for three seasons over 2017, 2018 and 2019.

=== Hartford Athletic ===
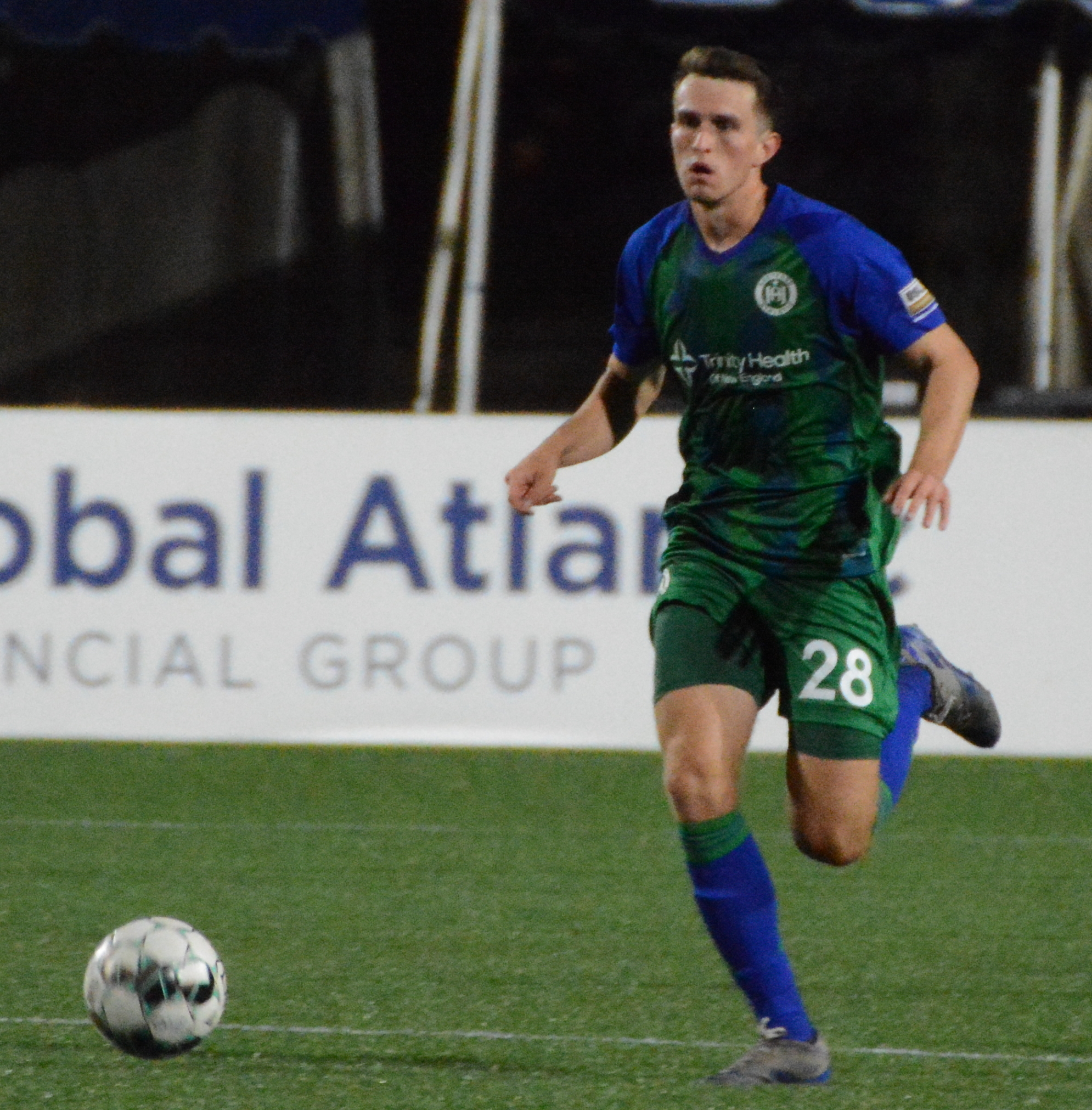
McGlynn with Hartford Athletic in 2021

On March 12, 2020, McGlynn joined USL Championship side Hartford Athletic ahead of their 2020 season. He made his professional debut on July 17, 2020, starting against New York Red Bulls II. He scored his first professional goal on October 5 against New York Red Bulls II and his goal was No. 5 on ESPNs SportsCenter highlights. On December 9, 2020, Hartford announced that McGlynn would return for the 2021 season. McGlynn was again featured on SportCenter when on June 5 he launched a ball over the New York Red Bull II goalkeepers head from deep inside his own half to put Hartford up 5–0 in the 59th minute.

=== Rhode Island FC ===
On November 8, 2023, McGlynn was announced as the second-ever signing for Rhode Island FC ahead of their inaugural 2024 season. McGlynn scored his first career goal for Rhode Island FC in the 11th minute of the club's inaugural U.S. Open Cup match against Charlotte Independence on April 16, 2024, though Rhode Island ultimately fell 5–4 on penalties following a 4–4 draw. On June 12, 2024, Conor McGlynn scored his first league goal for Rhode Island FC in the 18th minute of their 2–2 draw against Memphis 901 FC. He was released by Rhode Island following the 2024 season.

=== Westchester SC ===
On December 23, 2024, it was announced McGlynn would join Westchester SC ahead of their debut season in the USL League One. On March 29, 2025, McGlynn scored his first goal for Westchester SC during their 3–1 road victory against Texoma FC. McGlynn ended his first season at the club with 24 appearances and 4 goals.

On March 7, 2026, McGlynn scored his first goal of the 2026 season for Westchester SC via a 19th-minute penalty kick during their 3–2 season-opening loss to One Knoxville SC. McGlynn broke the USL League One single-season scoring record for a midfielder on September 19, 2026, during Westchester SC's 2–1 road victory over the New York Cosmos at Hinchliffe Stadium in Paterson, New Jersey. McGlynn's 98th minute stoppage time winner was his 14th goal of the season. McGlynn ended the 2026 USL League One season with a league-record 16 goals for a midfielder and was named to the All-League First Team.

== Personal ==
Conor's younger brother is Jack McGlynn, who also plays professional soccer for EFL Championship club Stoke City.

The two faced off twice during the 2020 season. In their first game against each other on July 25, Hartford won 3–2. In their second meeting Jack scored a tying goal at the 76th minute to allow Philadelphia Union II to draw after an 88th-minute goal from Conor was waived off due to a yellow card on Hartford defender Sam Strong.

== Career statistics ==
=== Club ===
As of 18 November 2026

Appearances and goals by club, season and competition
Club	Season	League			National cup (Note: Includes U.S. Open Cup)		League cup (Note: Includes USL Cup)		Other		Total	
Club	Season	Division	Apps	Goals	Apps	Goals	Apps	Goals	Apps	Goals	Apps	Goals
FA Euro New York	2017–2019 (Note: Combined totals across three seasons in USL League Two)	USL League Two	33	7	—	—	—	—	—	—	33	7
Hartford Athletic	2020	USL Championship	9	1	—	—	—	—	1 (Note: Appearance in USL Championship playoffs)	0	10	1
Hartford Athletic	2021	USL Championship	29	5	—	—	—	—	—	—	29	5
Hartford Athletic	2022	USL Championship	29	1	2	1	—	—	—	—	31	2
Hartford Athletic	2023	USL Championship	31	2	2	0	—	—	—	—	33	2
Hartford Athletic	Total		98	9	4	1	—	—	1	0	103	10
Rhode Island FC	2024	USL Championship	14	1	1	1	—	—	0	0	15	2
Westchester SC	2025	USL League One	20	4	3	0	2	0	—	—	25	4
Westchester SC	2026	USL League One	32	16	3	0	4	1	—	—	39	17
Westchester SC	Total		52	20	6	0	6	1	—	—	64	21
Career total			197	37	11	2	6	1	1	0	215	40
