= 2025 Portland Hearts of Pine season =

Portland Hearts of Pine
2025 season
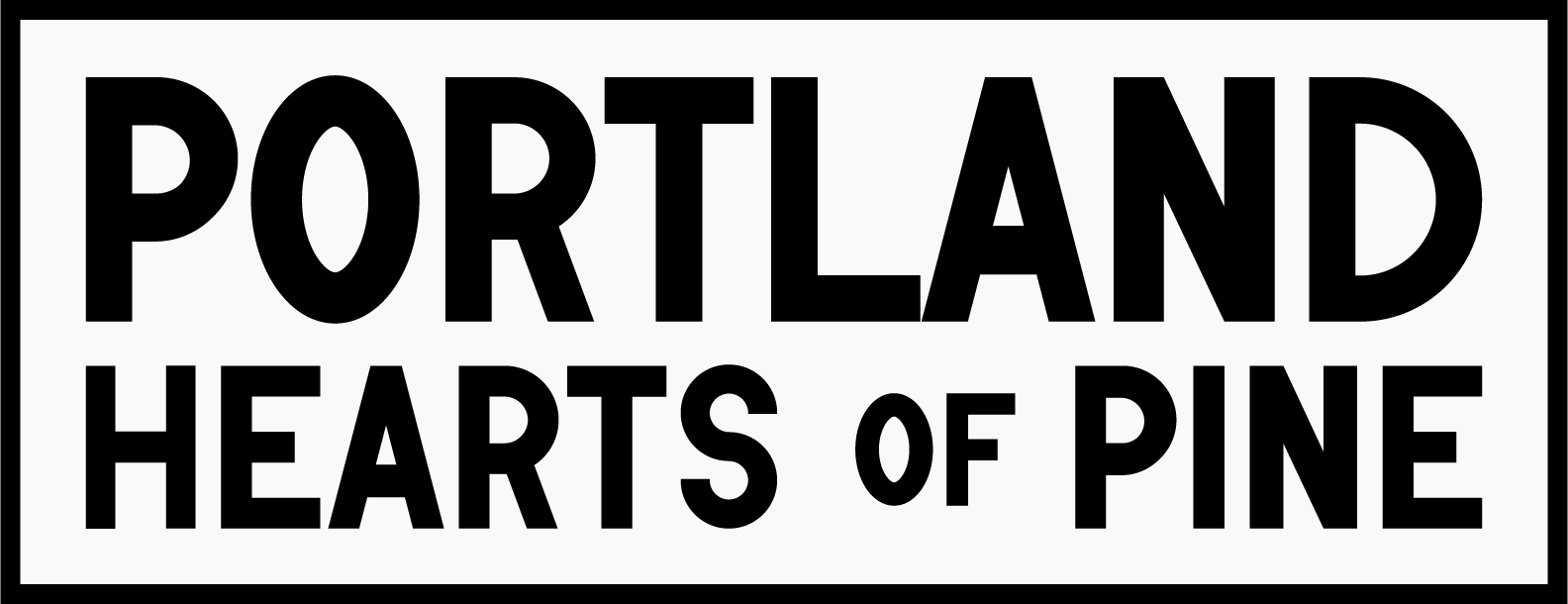
- Owner: Gabe Hoffman-Johnson; Jonathan and Catherine Culley; Tom Caron
- President: Kevin Schohl
- Head coach: Bobby Murphy
- Stadium: Fitzpatrick Stadium
- USL1: 7th
- U.S. Open Cup: Third Round
- USL Cup: Group Stage, 4th Group D
- USL1 Playoffs: Semifinals
- Top goalscorer: League: Masashi Wada; Ollie Wright (9 Goals Each); All: Ollie Wright (13 goals)
- Highest home attendance: 6,440 vs Spokane Velocity October 21
- Lowest home attendance: 5,680 vs Union Omaha June 15 (league), 2,933 vs Rhode Island FC April 15 (US Open Cup)
- Average home league attendance: 5,829 (league); 5,808 (with USL Cup), 5,409 (with US Open Cup)
- Biggest win: Portland 6–1 Spokane October 21
- Biggest defeat: Rhode Island 4–1 Portland June 27
Woods & Water colors	Bandit colors	Blaze colors

The 2025 Portland Hearts of Pine season was the inaugural season in the club's existence. The club competes in USL League One, the third-tier of American soccer, and also participated in the Lamar Hunt US Open Cup and the USL Cup. The team finished in seventh place in USL League One, qualifying for the playoffs, where they were eliminated in the semifinals by Spokane Velocity.

== Players and staff ==
=== Final roster ===
Players and squad numbers last updated on 10 November 2025.
Note: Flags indicate national team as defined under FIFA eligibility rules; some limited exceptions apply. Players may hold more than one non-FIFA nationality.

No.	Pos.	Nation	Player
1	GK	USA	Hunter Morse
2	DF	USA	Jaden Jones-Riley
3	DF	ENG	Nathan Messer
5	MF	USA	Mikey Lopez (co-captain)
6	MF	USA	Patrick Langlois (co-captain)
7	DF	USA	Sean Vinberg
8	MF	TRI	Michel Poon-Angeron
9	FW	USA	Azaad Liadi (on loan from Lexington SC)
10	MF	ENG	Ollie Wright
11	FW	USA	Evan Southern
12	FW	USA	Jake Keegan
14	FW	USA	Titus Washington
17	MF	USA	Mickey Reilly

No.	Pos.	Nation	Player
19	DF	CRC	Shandon Wright
21	DF	PUR	Colby Quiñones
22	FW	CPV	Walter Varela
23	GK	USA	Kashope Oladapo
45	DF	FRA	Séga Coulibaly
47	MF	TRI	Nathaniel James
50	DF	SOM	Mo Mohamed
66	DF	JAM	Kemali Green
77	MF	JPN	Masashi Wada
80	MF	SLE	Jay Tee Kamara
90	MF	USA	Khalid Hersi
99	FW	NOR	Noah Kvifte

=== Staff ===
Front Office Staff
Founder and Chief Community Officer	(United States) Gabe Hoffman-Johnson
President and Chief Business Officer	(United States) Kevin Schohl
Technical Staff
Head Coach and Sporting Director	(United States) Bobby Murphy
Assistant Coach	(England) Alex Ryan
Goalie Coach	(Japan) Yuta Nomura
Director of Soccer Operations	(United States) James Hilepo
Equipment Manager	(Israel) Yoray Shoshani
Team Trainer	(United States) Ryan McNamara

== Transfers ==
=== In ===
Date	Position	Number	Name	From	Type	Fee	Ref.
December 17, 2024	MF	8	(Trinidad and Tobago) Michel Poon-Angeron	(Trinidad and Tobago) AC Port of Spain	Signing	NA	
December 28, 2024	DF	2	(United States) Jaden Jones-Riley	(United States) Portland Timbers 2	Signing	NA	
December 28, 2024	MF	5	(United States) Mikey Lopez	(United States) Birmingham Legion	Signing	NA	
December 28, 2024	MF	10	(England) Ollie Wright	(United States) Huntsville City FC	Signing	NA	
January 8, 2025	MF	90	(United States) Khalid Hersi	(United States) Southern Maine Huskies	Signing	NA	
January 10, 2025	MF	6	(United States) Patrick Langlois	(United States) Northern Colorado Hailstorm FC	Signing	NA	
January 10, 2025	MF	17	(United States) Mickey Reilly	(United States) Carthage Firebirds	Signing	NA	
January 10, 2025	FW	11	(United States) Evan Southern	(United States) James Madison Dukes	Signing	NA	
January 14, 2025	DF	4	(Finland) Samuel Mahlamäki Camacho	(Poland) Flota Świnoujście	Signing	NA	
January 14, 2025	MF	3	(England) Nathan Messer	(United States) Rhode Island FC	Signing	NA	
January 17, 2025	MF	66	(Jamaica) Kemali Green	(United States) Temple Owls	Signing	NA	
January 17, 2025	DF	21	(Puerto Rico) Colby Quiñones	(United States) New England Revolution II	Signing	NA	
January 23, 2025	GK	23	(United States) Kashope Oladapo	(United States) Portland Pilots	Signing	NA	
January 23, 2025	GK	1	(United States) Hunter Morse	(United States) FC Cincinnati 2	Signing	NA	
January 23, 2025	FW	14	(United States) Titus Washington	(United States) Seattle Redhawks	Signing	NA	
January 23, 2025	DF	19	(Costa Rica) Shandon Wright	(Costa Rica) Municipal Grecia	Signing	NA	
January 23, 2025	MF	80	(Sierra Leone) Jay Tee Kamara	(Sweden) Sandvikens IF	Signing	NA	
February 8, 2025	DF	7	(United States) Sean Vinberg	(United States) Central Valley Fuego FC	Signing	NA	
February 8, 2025	FW	22	(Cape Verde) Walter Varela	(United States) Chattanooga Red Wolves SC	Signing	NA	
March 5, 2025	MF	77	(Japan) Masashi Wada	(Japan) Thespa Gunma	Signing	NA	
March 10, 2025	MF	47	(Trinidad and Tobago) Nathaniel James	(Jamaica) Mount Pleasant FA	Signing	NA	
March 15, 2025	MF	9	(United States) Azaad Liadi	(United States) Lexington SC	Loan	NA	
March 18, 2025	FW	12	(United States) Jake Keegan	(United States) One Knoxville SC	Signing	NA	
May 23, 2025	DF	50	(Somalia) Mo Mohamed	(United States) Portland Timbers 2	Signing (Note: Initially signed to a 25 day contract, Mohamed was given a permanent deal on June 16)	NA	
July 1, 2025	DF	45	(France) Séga Coulibaly	(France) LB Châteauroux	Signing	NA	
July 29, 2025	FW	99	(Norway) Noah Kvifte	(Norway) Asker Fotball	Signing	NA	

=== Out ===
Date	Position	Number	Name	To	Type	Fee	Ref.
July 15, 2025	DF	4	(Finland) Samuel Mahlamäki Camacho	(Norway) Alta IF	Mutual termination	NA	

== Non-competitive fixtures ==
Portland's first two preseason friendly matches were announced by Rhode Island FC on January 15, 2025.

=== Friendlies ===
February 21	Bermuda	0–2	Portland Hearts of Pine	Devonshire, Bermuda
7:00 PM			Washington 79'; Keegan 85'	Stadium: Flora Duffy South Field Stadium

February 24	Rhode Island FC	0–0	Portland Hearts of Pine	Devonshire, Bermuda
				Stadium: Flora Duffy South Field Stadium

March 1	Hartford Athletic	0–4	Portland Hearts of Pine	Hartford, Connecticut
2:00 PM			own goal 22'; Varela 43'; Jones-Riley 45'; O. Wright 62'	Stadium: Trinity Health Stadium

August 6	Portland Hearts of Pine	2–1	HFX Wanderers FC (Note: The friendly against Halifax Wanderers FC was a replacement for a match against Inter New Hampshire of the United Premier Soccer League.)	Portland, Maine
6:30 PM	Lopez 18'; Kvifte (yellow card) 21'; S. Wright (yellow card) 45+1'; O. Wright 90+2'; Oladapo (yellow card) 90+4'	Report	Gagnon-Laparé (yellow card) 26' (yellow-red card) 78'; Alphonse (yellow card) 38'; Ciccarelli 57'; Rushenas (yellow card) 88' (red card) 90+2'	Stadium: Fitzpatrick Stadium; Attendance: 5,645; Referee: Andrew Porada

== Competitive fixtures ==
=== Regular season ===
March 29 1	FC Naples	0–0	Portland Hearts of Pine	Naples, Florida
7:00 PM EST	Glasser (yellow card) 28'; Ferrin (yellow card) 35'; Cisneros (yellow card) 45+3'; Pasnik (yellow card) 87'	Report	Varela (yellow card) 38'; O. Wright (yellow card) 61'	Stadium: Paradise Coast Sports Complex; Attendance: 4,294; Referee: Benjamin Meyer

April 5 2	Spokane Velocity	0–0	Portland Hearts of Pine	Spokane, Washington
9:00 PM EST	Peláez (yellow card) 45+1'	Report	Lopez (yellow card) 39'; Poon-Angeron (yellow card) 58'; S. Wright (yellow card) 90'	Stadium: ONE Spokane Stadium; Attendance: 2,081; Referee: Alex Beehler

April 12 3	South Georgia Tormenta FC	2–1	Portland Hearts of Pine	Statesboro, Georgia
7:30 PM EST	Tunbridge 6'; Kasanzu (yellow card) 16'; Bwana (yellow card) 31'; Prepeliță (yellow card) 38' (red card) 79'; Bazini (yellow card) 46'; Reid-Stephen 83'; Vivas (yellow card) 87'; Pack (yellow card) 90+3'	Report	Jones-Riley (yellow card) 30'; Lopez (yellow card) 69'; Langlois 81'; Varela (yellow card) 89'	Stadium: Tormenta Stadium; Attendance: 1,048; Referee: Stearne Briem

May 4 4	Portland Hearts of Pine	1–1	One Knoxville SC	Portland, Maine
6:00 PM EST	Poon-Angeron (yellow card) 33'; Wada 45+2'	Report	Ritchie 2'; Caputo (yellow card) 45+5'; Haugli (yellow card) 73'; Diene (yellow card) 86'	Stadium: Fitzpatrick Stadium; Attendance: 5,784; Referee: Ryan Homik

May 10 5	Union Omaha	2–2	Portland Hearts of Pine	Papillion, Nebraska
8:00 PM EST	Milanese (yellow card) 35'; Owusu 54'; Ostrem (yellow card) 69'; Kallman (yellow card) 73'; Gallardo 83' (pen.)	Report	Liadi 45+2'; Messer (yellow card) 48'; S. Wright (yellow card) 71'; Washington (yellow card) 74'; Murphy (yellow card) 83'; James 86'; Reilly (yellow card) 90+3'	Stadium: Werner Park; Attendance: 3,346; Referee: Drew Klemp

May 17 6	Portland Hearts of Pine	2–1	FC Naples	Portland, Maine
6:00 PM EST	Vinberg (yellow card) 40'; Kamara 43'; Morse (yellow card) 58'; Messer (yellow card) 60'; Varela 75'	Report	Serrano (red card) 8'; Heckenberg (yellow card) 30'; Henderlong (yellow card) 45' (yellow-red card) 77'; Fernandes (yellow card) 45+4'; Prpa 56'	Stadium: Fitzpatrick Stadium; Attendance: 5,715; Referee: Lauren Aldrich

May 24 7	Forward Madison FC	1–1	Portland Hearts of Pine	Madison, Wisconsin
7:00 PM EST	Boyce 7' (pen.); Viader (yellow card) 38'; Garcia (yellow card) 67'	Report	Messer 35'; Lopez (yellow card) 41'; Varela (yellow card) 45+3'; Poon-Angeron (yellow card) 69'; Kamara (yellow card) 72'; Vinberg (yellow card) 76'; O. Wright (yellow card) 90+3'	Stadium: Breese Stevens Field; Attendance: 3,954; Referee: Amin Hadzic

June 7 8	Chattanooga Red Wolves SC	2–1	Portland Hearts of Pine	East Ridge, Tennessee
7:00 PM EST	Wessels (yellow card) 13'; Watters 28' (yellow card) 56'; Hernández 38'	Report	Liadi 5'; Messer (yellow card) 40'; Lopez (yellow card) 45'; Vinberg (yellow card) 49'	Stadium: CHI Memorial Stadium; Attendance: 2,007; Referee: DeShun Beard

June 15 9	Portland Hearts of Pine	3–1	Union Omaha	Portland, Maine
6:00 PM EST	O. Wright 48', 73', 80' (yellow card) 80'; Lopez (yellow card) 50'; Vinberg (yellow card) 58'; Liadi (yellow card) 68'; Murphy (yellow card) 68'	Report	Holt (yellow card) 25'; Acoff 37'; Schneider (yellow card) 57'	Stadium: Fitzpatrick Stadium; Attendance: 5,703; Referee: Stephen Foster

June 21 10	AV Alta FC	1–1	Portland Hearts of Pine	Lancaster, California
11:00 PM EST	Pehlivanov (yellow card) 27'; Villalobos (yellow card) 32'; Alaribe 39' (yellow card) 89'; Pajaro (yellow card) 58'	Report	Vinberg (yellow card) 21'; O. Wright (yellow card) 45+3'; Wada (yellow card) 75'; Liadi 77' (yellow card) 89'	Stadium: Lancaster Municipal Stadium; Attendance: 4,020; Referee: Matthew Thompson

July 2 11	Portland Hearts of Pine	0–2	AV Alta FC	Portland, Maine
6:30 PM EST	Washington (yellow card) 15'; Wada (yellow card) 35'	Report	Desdunes 39'; Blancas (yellow card) 59'; Alassane (yellow card) 68'; Martinez 77'; Avilez (yellow card) 78'	Stadium: Fitzpatrick Stadium; Attendance: 5,735; Referee: Luis Arroyo

July 6 12	Portland Hearts of Pine	1–1	South Georgia Tormenta FC	Portland, Maine
6:30 PM EST	Washington (yellow card) 16'; Kamara 45+3'; Coulibaly (yellow card) 59'; Quiñones (yellow card) 72'	Report	Stretch (yellow card) 19' (yellow-red card) 74'; Nyandjo 64'	Stadium: Fitzpatrick Stadium; Attendance: 5,706; Referee: John Rush

July 12 13	Texoma FC	0–1	Portland Hearts of Pine	Sherman, Texas
8:30 PM EST	McManus (yellow card) 1'; Forbes (yellow card) 21'; McCormick (yellow card) 49' (red card) 90+1'; Perkins (yellow card) 70'; Garcia (yellow card) 90+6'	Report	Perkins 5' (o.g.); Green (yellow card) 21'; Washington (yellow card) 25'; Quiñones (yellow card) 54'; Messer (yellow card) 90+3'	Stadium: Historic Bearcat Stadium; Attendance: 216; Referee: Gerald Flores

July 16 14	Portland Hearts of Pine	3–1	Greenville Triumph SC	Portland, Maine
6:30 PM EST	Lopez (yellow card) 10'; Wada 55' (yellow card) 74'; Washington 57', 78'; O. Wright (yellow card) 90'; Morse (yellow card) 90+2'	Report	Robles (yellow card) 32'; Castro (yellow card) 50'; Marsh 63'	Stadium: Fitzpatrick Stadium; Attendance: 5,680; Referee: Danielle Chesky

July 19 15	Charlotte Independence	1–1	Portland Hearts of Pine	Charlotte, North Carolina
7:00 PM EST	Ngah 10'; Dimick (yellow card) 87'	Report	Green (yellow card) 49'; Messer 69'	Stadium: American Legion Memorial Stadium; Attendance: 676; Referee: Muhammad Kaleia

August 2 16	One Knoxville SC	1–0	Portland Hearts of Pine	Knoxville, Tennessee
7:00 PM EST	Johnson (yellow card) 21'; Gøling 37'; Kelly (yellow card) 81'; Zarokostas (yellow card) 85'	Report	Vinberg (yellow card) 28'; Green (yellow card) 55'; Langlois (yellow card) 67'; Murphy (yellow card) 90+1'	Stadium: Covenant Health Park; Attendance: 4,615; Referee: Benjamin Meyer

August 9 17	Portland Hearts of Pine	0–0	Richmond Kickers	Portland, Maine
6:00 PM EST	Vinberg (yellow card) 68'	Report	Baer (yellow card) 77'; Kirkland (yellow card) 80'	Stadium: Fitzpatrick Stadium; Attendance: 5,796; Referee: Atahan Yaya

August 24 18	Westchester SC	2–3	Portland Hearts of Pine	Mount Vernon, New York
7:00 PM EST	Drack (yellow card) 1' (yellow-red card) 73'; Mačkić 16'; Saydee 45'; Payne (yellow card) 54'; N. Powder (yellow card) 56'; Palma (yellow card) 64'; Bouman (yellow card) 83'	Report	Lopez (yellow card) 13'; Washington 26'; O. Wright 36'; Messer 43' (yellow card) 75'; Wada (yellow card) 63'; Vinberg (yellow card) 78'; Morse (yellow card) 90+6'	Stadium: The Stadium at Memorial Field; Attendance: 2,958; Referee: Ryan Farrell

August 30 19	Portland Hearts of Pine	4–2	Charlotte Independence	Portland, Maine
6:00 PM EST	Wada 28'; Vinberg 69'; Kamara 78'; Lopez (yellow card) 81'; Poon-Angeron (yellow card) 83'; O. Wright 87'	Report	Spielman 36' (pen.); Ciss (yellow card) 54'; Moreno 90+5'	Stadium: Fitzpatrick Stadium; Attendance: 5,710; Referee: John Griggs

September 3 20	Greenville Triumph SC	2–3	Portland Hearts of Pine	Greenville, South Carolina
7:00 PM EST	Mensah 15' (yellow card) 84'; Robles 50'; Bubb (yellow card) 90+4'	Report	Poon-Angeron (yellow card) 3' (yellow-red card) 85'; Wada 45+1'; Lopez (yellow card) 53'; Kamara 80'; Murphy (yellow card) 88'; Washington 90+1'	Stadium: Paladin Stadium; Attendance: 1,641; Referee: Mario Maric

September 13 21	Portland Hearts of Pine	1–1	Chattanooga Red Wolves SC	Portland, Maine
5:00 PM EST	Varela (yellow card) 45+7'; Green 62'; Mohamed (yellow card) 90+5'	Report	P. Hernández (yellow card) 18'; O. Hernandez 45+1' (pen.); Ayimbila (yellow card) 45+6'; Ualefi (yellow card) 53'; Green (yellow card) 66'; Lelin (yellow card) 87'; Bentley (yellow card) 90+4'	Stadium: Fitzpatrick Stadium; Attendance: 5,811; Referee: Carlos Rodriguez

September 17 22	Richmond Kickers	2–5	Portland Hearts of Pine	Richmond, Virginia
7:00 PM EST	Espinal (yellow card) 4' (goal) 21'; Cela (yellow card) 58'; Anderson 76'; Fitch (yellow card) 84'	Report	Varela 12'; Lopez (yellow card) 20'; O. Wright 27' (pen.); Wada 52', 69', 84'; S. Wright (yellow card) 88'	Stadium: City Stadium; Attendance: 3,242; Referee: Ekaterina Koroleva

September 21 23	Portland Hearts of Pine	1–0	FC Naples	Portland, Maine
5:00 PM EST	Murphy (yellow card) 9'; O. Wright 39' (pen.) (yellow card) 68'; Messer (yellow card) 44'; Morse (yellow card) 90+3'	Report	Dengler (yellow card) 37' (yellow-red card) 80'; Heckenberg (yellow card) 85'	Stadium: Fitzpatrick Stadium; Attendance: 5,862; Referee: Edson Carvajal

September 27 24	Portland Hearts of Pine	1–0	Texoma FC	Portland, Maine
5:00 PM EST	Messer (yellow card) 4' (goal) 75'; Lopez (yellow card) 48'; Washington (yellow card) 59'; Poon-Angeron (yellow card) 76'; Morse (yellow card) 90+3'	Report	Ramos (yellow card) 25'; Forbes (yellow card) 32'; Perkins (yellow card) 81'	Stadium: Fitzpatrick Stadium; Attendance: 5,781; Referee: Alex Beehler

October 1 25	Union Omaha	1–0	Portland Hearts of Pine	Papillion, Nebraska
1:00 PM EST	Ostrem (yellow card) 34'; Kasim 47'; Wootton (yellow card) 52'; Becher (yellow card) 90+3'	Report	Vinberg (yellow card) 25'; Kamara (yellow card) 90+4'	Stadium: Werner Park; Attendance: 4,429; Referee: Danielle Chesky

October 4 26	Portland Hearts of Pine	1–3	Forward Madison FC	Portland, Maine
5:00 PM EST	Lopez (yellow card) 22'; Green (yellow card) 42'; Keegan 72'; Kamara (red card) 82'; Varela (yellow card) 76'; Langlois (yellow card) 89'	Report	Gebhard 20'; Dourado 36' (pen.); Angking (yellow card) 79'; Brown (yellow card) 85'; McLaughlin 90+2'	Stadium: Fitzpatrick Stadium; Attendance: 5,771; Referee: Muhammad Kaleia

October 10 27	One Knoxville SC	3–1	Portland Hearts of Pine	Knoxville, Tennessee
6:30 PM EST	Tekiela 38'; Zarokostas 59'; Haugli (yellow card) 76'; Diene 87'; Doyle (yellow card) 90'	Report	Vinberg (yellow card) 37'; Keegan 61'; Lopez (yellow card) 78'	Stadium: Covenant Health Park; Attendance: 3,603; Referee: Corbyn May

October 18 28	Portland Hearts of Pine	2–2	Westchester SC	Portland, Maine
5:00 PM EST	O. Wright 47' (pen.); Green (yellow card) 62'; Murphy (yellow card) 68'; Wada 75'	Report	Drack (yellow card) 46'; Carton (yellow card) 50'; Obregón 72', 90' (yellow card) 90+2'; Bouman (yellow card) 77'	Stadium: Fitzpatrick Stadium; Attendance: 5,856; Referee: Amin Hadzic

October 21 29 (Note: This match was originally scheduled for August 17, but was postponed due to travel issues for Spokane Velocity.)	Portland Hearts of Pine	6–1	Spokane Velocity	Portland, Maine
6:00 PM EST	James 18', 43'; O. Wright 35' (pen.); Messer 45+3'; Washington 59'; Kamara 67'	Report	Brett 41'; García (yellow card) 63'	Stadium: Fitzpatrick Stadium; Attendance: 6,440; Referee: Calin Radosav

October 25 30	Portland Hearts of Pine	2–2	AV Alta FC	Portland, Maine
5:00 PM EST	James (yellow card) 20'; Poon-Angeron (yellow card) 32'; Wada 35' (yellow card) 68' (yellow-red card) 72'; Messer 63'	Report	Blancas 8', 70'; Pehlivanov (yellow card) 23'; Aoumaich (yellow card) 45'	Stadium: Fitzpatrick Stadium; Attendance: 6,089; Referee: Alexandra Billeter

=== Playoffs ===
November 1 Quarterfinals	Chattanooga Red Wolves SC	0–1	Portland Hearts of Pine	East Ridge, Tennessee
7:00 PM EDT		Report	Green (yellow card) 26'; Keegan (yellow card) 53'; O. Wright 55'; James (yellow card) 67'	Stadium: CHI Memorial Stadium; Attendance: 2,203; Referee: Muhammad Hassan

November 9 Semifinals	Spokane Velocity	2–2 (a.e.t.) (6–5 p)	Portland Hearts of Pine	Spokane, Washington
9:00 PM EDT	Gil 45'; Lewis (yellow card) 90+1'; Vinyals 120+1'; Hernandez (yellow card) 120+4'	Report	Wright 53' (yellow card) 70'; Green (yellow card) 60'; Kamara (yellow card) 90+6' (goal) 92'	Stadium: ONE Spokane Stadium; Attendance: 2,680; Referee: Elvis Osmanovic
	Penalties
	Vinyals (penalty scored); Peláez (penalty scored); Lewis (penalty missed); Hernandez (penalty scored); García (penalty scored); Miller (penalty scored); Crisler (penalty scored)		(penalty scored) Keegan; (penalty scored) Coulibaly; (penalty scored) Liadi; (penalty scored) Wada; (penalty missed) Kamara; (penalty scored) Messer; (penalty missed) Poon-Angeron

=== Lamar Hunt US Open Cup ===
March 20 First round	Portland Hearts of Pine	4–0	CD Faialense	Lewiston, Maine
6:30 PM EST	Varela 17'; Liadi 29', 62'; Vinberg (yellow card) 45+4'; Messer 68'	Report	Leahy (yellow card) 45+6'; Arlotti (yellow card) 52'	Stadium: Franklin Athletic Complex; Attendance: 3,500; Referee: Andrew Porada

April 2 Second round	Portland Hearts of Pine	1–1 (a.e.t.) (4–2 p)	Hartford Athletic	Lewiston, Maine
6:30 PM EST	Washington (yellow card) 75'; Liadi (yellow card) 93' (yellow-red card) 96'; Keegan 117'	Report	Makangila (yellow card) 42'; Scarlett (yellow card) 67' (goal) 107'; Farrell (yellow card) 93'; Beckford (yellow card) 116'	Stadium: Franklin Athletic Complex; Attendance: 3,002; Referee: Kyle Averill
	Penalties
	Langlois (penalty scored); Keegan (penalty scored); Messer (penalty scored); Southern (penalty scored)		(penalty scored) Farrell; (penalty scored) Dieng; (penalty missed) Anderson; (penalty missed) Ngalina

April 15 Third Round	Portland Hearts of Pine	1–2	Rhode Island FC	Lewiston, Maine
7:00 PM EST	Lopez (yellow card) 9' (yellow-red card) 87'; Langlois (yellow card) 36'; Poon-Angeron (yellow card) 47'; Washington 65'	Report	Nodarse (yellow card) 29' (goal) 37'; Holstad 34'; Sanchez (yellow card) 45+3'; Shapiro-Thompson (yellow card) 49'; Yao (yellow card) 76' (yellow-red card) 78'	Stadium: Franklin Athletic Complex; Attendance: 2,933; Referee: Thomas Snyder

=== USL Cup ===
April 26 Group Stage	Hartford Athletic	2–0	Portland Hearts of Pine	Hartford, Connecticut
4:00 PM EST	Panayotou 41', 64' (yellow card) 45+1' (yellow-red card) 72'; Farrell (yellow card) 68'; Burke (yellow card) 73'; Careaga (yellow card) 74'; Siaha (yellow card) 84'	Report	S. Wright (yellow card) 29'; Langlois (yellow card) 47'	Stadium: Trinity Health Stadium; Attendance: 3,878; Referee: Ricardo Montero Araya

May 31 Group Stage	Portland Hearts of Pine	4–2	Detroit City FC	Portland, Maine
6:00 PM EST	Liadi 5'; O. Wright 28'; Oladapo (yellow card) 45+2'; Varela 79'; Murphy (yellow card) 85'; Mohamed 85'	Report	Guenzatti 52'; Chapman (yellow card) 72'; Smith 81'	Stadium: Fitzpatrick Stadium; Attendance: 5,651; Referee: Luis Arroyo

June 27 Group Stage	Rhode Island FC	4–1	Portland Hearts of Pine	Pawtucket, Rhode Island
7:00 PM EST	Dikwa 18', 50', 58' (yellow card) 44'; Kwizera (yellow card) 36'; Smith (red card) 45+3'; Rodriguez (yellow card) 48'; Fuson 85'; Sanchez (yellow card) 90'	Report	S. Wright (yellow card) 17'; Mohamed (yellow card) 53'; Washington 63'	Stadium: Tidewater Landing Stadium; Attendance: 7,502; Referee: Muhammad Hassan

July 25 Group Stage	Portland Hearts of Pine	2–2 (5–4 p)	Pittsburgh Riverhounds SC	Portland, Maine
6:30 PM EST	Oladapo (red card) 29'; S. Wright (yellow card) 59'; Washington 64'; Southern (yellow card) 66'; O. Wright 72' (yellow card) 86'	Report	Jacquesson 71' 75' (pen.) (yellow card) 52'	Stadium: Fitzpatrick Stadium; Attendance: 5,651; Referee: Edson Carvajal
	Penalties
	O. Wright (penalty scored); Kamara (penalty scored); Wada (penalty scored); Washington (penalty scored); Langlois (penalty scored)		(penalty scored) Broughton; (penalty missed) Garcia; (penalty scored) Ahl; (penalty scored) Griffin; (penalty scored) Suber

== Statistics ==
=== Final standings ===
Pos	Team	Pld	W	L	T	GF	GA	GD	Pts	Qualification
1	One Knoxville SC (S, C)	30	16	5	9	43	26	+17	57	Playoffs
2	Chattanooga Red Wolves SC	30	15	5	10	42	30	+12	55	Playoffs
3	Spokane Velocity FC	30	14	7	9	41	35	+6	51	Playoffs
4	FC Naples	30	13	9	8	40	32	+8	47	Playoffs
5	Union Omaha	30	13	10	7	51	39	+12	46	Playoffs
6	South Georgia Tormenta FC	30	13	11	6	55	47	+8	45 (Note: South Georgia is ahead of Portland on total wins, South Georgia 13, Portland 11)	Playoffs
7	Portland Hearts of Pine	30	11	7	12	48	38	+10	45	Playoffs
8	Charlotte Independence	30	10	13	7	45	50	−5	37	Playoffs
9	AV Alta FC	30	8	10	12	42	47	−5	36	
10	Forward Madison FC	30	8	11	11	31	43	−12	35	
11	Greenville Triumph SC	30	8	14	8	38	43	−5	32	
12	Texoma FC	30	7	14	9	35	55	−20	30	
13	Richmond Kickers	30	8	17	5	43	53	−10	29	
14	Westchester SC	30	5	16	9	43	59	−16	24	

Source: USL League One
Rules for classification: 1) points; 2) total wins; 3) total goal differential; 4) total goals scored; 5) points earned against top four finishers; 6) disciplinary points; 7) drawing of lots.
(C) Champions; (S) Players' Shield winner

=== Appearances and goals ===
No.	Pos	Nat	Player	Total		USL League One		Lamar Hunt US Open Cup		USL Cup		USL League One Playoffs	
No.	Pos	Nat	Player	Apps	Goals	Apps	Goals	Apps	Goals	Apps	Goals	Apps	Goals
1	GK	(United States) USA	Hunter Morse	35	0	28+0	0	3+0	0	1+1	0	2+0	0
2	DF	(United States) USA	Jaden Jones-Riley	6	0	2+1	0	3+0	0	0+0	0	0+0	0
3	DF	(England) ENG	Nathan Messer	39	7	29+1	6	3+0	1	3+1	0	2+0	0
4	DF	(Finland) FIN	Samuel Mahlamäki Camacho	8	0	3+1	0	0+2	0	2+0	0	0+0	0
5	MF	(United States) USA	Mikey Lopez	34	0	25+3	0	1+1	0	2+0	0	1+1	0
6	MF	(United States) USA	Patrick Langlois	35	1	14+13	1	2+1	0	2+1	0	1+1	0
7	DF	(United States) USA	Sean Vinberg	39	1	27+3	1	3+0	0	3+1	0	0+2	0
8	MF	(Trinidad and Tobago) TRI	Michel Poon-Angeron	35	0	23+4	0	3+0	0	2+1	0	2+0	0
9	MF	(United States) USA	Azaad Liadi	18	6	8+4	3	2+0	2	1+1	1	0+2	0
10	MF	(England) ENG	Ollie Wright	39	13	25+5	9	3+0	0	2+2	2	2+0	2
11	FW	(United States) USA	Evan Southern	17	0	4+8	0	0+3	0	1+0	0	0+1	0
12	FW	(United States) USA	Jake Keegan	20	3	4+11	2	0+2	1	1+0	0	1+1	0
14	FW	(United States) USA	Titus Washington	35	8	18+8	5	3+0	1	2+2	2	2+0	0
17	MF	(United States) USA	Mickey Reilly	14	0	5+6	0	0+0	0	2+1	0	0+0	0
19	DF	(Costa Rica) CRC	Shandon Wright	14	0	7+2	0	0+1	0	3+0	0	0+1	0
21	DF	(Puerto Rico) PUR	Colby Quiñones	18	0	11+5	0	0+0	0	2+0	0	0+0	0
22	FW	(Cape Verde) CPV	Walter Varela	33	4	17+9	2	3+0	1	2+2	1	0+0	0
23	GK	(United States) USA	Kashope Oladapo	5	0	2+0	0	0+0	0	3+0	0	0+0	0
45	MF	(France) FRA	Séga Coulibaly	10	0	5+3	0	0+0	0	0+0	0	2+0	0
47	MF	(Trinidad and Tobago) TRI	Nathaniel James	21	3	3+11	3	0+1	0	3+1	0	2+0	0
50	MF	(Somalia) SOM	Mo Mohamed	19	1	6+8	0	0+0	0	2+1	1	2+0	0
66	MF	(Jamaica) JAM	Kemali Green	29	1	22+0	1	3+0	0	2+0	0	2+0	0
77	FW	(Japan) JPN	Masashi Wada	32	9	24+2	9	1+0	0	2+2	0	1+0	0
80	MF	(Sierra Leone) SLE	Jay Tee Kamara	28	6	12+12	5	0+0	0	1+2	0	0+1	1
90	MF	(United States) USA	Khalid Hersi	2	0	0+1	0	0+1	0	0+0	0	0+0	0
99	FW	(Norway) NOR	Noah Kvifte	11	0	4+7	0	0+0	0	0+0	0	0+0	0

=== Top goalscorers ===
Rank	Position	Number	Name	USL1 Season	U.S. Open Cup	USL Cup	USL League One Playoffs	Total
1	MF	10	(England) Ollie Wright	9	0	2	2	13
2	MF	77	(Japan) Masashi Wada	9	0	0	0	9
3	FW	14	(United States) Titus Washington	5	1	2	0	8
4	MF	3	(England) Nathan Messer	6	1	0	0	7
5	MF	80	(Sierra Leone) Jay Tee Kamara	5	0	0	1	6
5	MF	9	(United States) Azaad Liadi	3	2	1	0	6
7	FW	22	(Cape Verde) Walter Varela	2	1	1	0	4
8	MF	47	(Trinidad and Tobago) Nathaniel James	3	0	0	0	3
8	FW	12	(United States) Jake Keegan	2	1	0	0	3
10	MF	6	(United States) Patrick Langlois	1	0	0	0	1
10	DF	7	(United States) Sean Vinberg	1	0	0	0	1
10	MF	66	(Jamaica) Kemali Green	1	0	0	0	1
10			Own goal	1	0	0	0	1
10	MF	50	(Somalia) Mo Mohamed	0	0	1	0	1
Total				48	6	7	2	63

=== Assist scorers ===
Rank	Position	Number	Name	USL1 Season	U.S. Open Cup	USL Cup	USL League One Playoffs	Total
1	MF	10	(England) Ollie Wright	8	0	1	0	9
2	MF	77	(Sierra Leone) Jay Tee Kamara	4	0	2	0	6
3	FW	14	(United States) Titus Washington	3	1	1	0	5
4	FW	3	(England) Nathan Messer	4	0	0	0	4
5	MF	8	(Trinidad and Tobago) Michel Poon-Angeron	2	1	0	0	3
5	FW	11	(United States) Evan Southern	2	1	0	0	3
7	MF	5	(United States) Mikey Lopez	2	0	0	0	2
7	FW	22	(Cape Verde) Walter Varela	2	0	0	0	2
7	MF	47	(Trinidad and Tobago) Nathaniel James	0	0	2	0	2
7	MF	77	(Japan) Masashi Wada	0	0	1	1	2
11	MF	9	(United States) Azaad Liadi	1	0	0	0	1
11	MF	66	(Jamaica) Kemali Green	1	0	0	0	1
11	FW	12	(United States) Jake Keegan	0	0	0	1	1
Total				29	3	7	2	41

=== Clean sheets ===
Rank	Number	Name	USL1 Season	U.S. Open Cup	USL Cup	USL1 Playoffs	Total
1	1	(United States) Hunter Morse	6	1	0	0	7
Total			6	1	0	0	7

=== Disciplinary record ===
No.	Pos.	Player	USL League One Regular Season			Lamar Hunt US Open Cup			USL Cup			USL League One Playoffs			Total		
No.	Pos.	Player	Booked	(yellow card) (yellow-red card)	Sent off (straight red)	Booked	(yellow card) (yellow-red card)	Sent off (straight red)	Booked	(yellow card) (yellow-red card)	Sent off (straight red)	Booked	(yellow card) (yellow-red card)	Sent off (straight red)	Booked	(yellow card) (yellow-red card)	Sent off (straight red)
1	GK	(United States) Hunter Morse	5	0	0	0	0	0	0	0	0	0	0	0	5	0	0
2	DF	(United States) Jaden Jones-Riley	1	0	0	0	0	0	0	0	0	0	0	0	1	0	0
3	DF	(England) Nathan Messer	8	0	0	0	0	0	0	0	0	0	0	0	8	0	0
4	DF	(Finland) Samuel Mahlamäki Camacho	0	0	0	0	0	0	0	0	0	0	0	0	0	0	0
5	MF	(United States) Mikey Lopez	13	0	0	2	1	0	0	0	0	0	0	0	15	1	0
6	MF	(United States) Patrick Langlois	2	0	0	1	0	0	1	0	0	0	0	0	4	0	0
7	DF	(United States) Sean Vinberg	11	0	0	1	0	0	0	0	0	0	0	0	12	0	0
8	MF	(Trinidad and Tobago) Michel Poon-Angeron	8	1	0	1	0	0	0	0	0	0	0	0	9	1	0
9	MF	(United States) Azaad Liadi	2	0	0	2	1	0	0	0	0	0	0	0	4	1	0
10	MF	(England) Ollie Wright	6	0	0	0	0	0	1	0	0	1	0	0	8	0	0
11	FW	(United States) Evan Southern	0	0	0	0	0	0	1	0	0	0	0	0	1	0	0
12	FW	(United States) Jake Keegan	0	0	0	0	0	0	0	0	0	1	0	0	1	0	0
14	FW	(United States) Titus Washington	5	0	0	1	0	0	0	0	0	0	0	0	6	0	0
17	MF	(United States) Mickey Reilly	1	0	0	0	0	0	0	0	0	0	0	0	1	0	0
19	DF	(Costa Rica) Shandon Wright	3	0	0	0	0	0	3	0	0	0	0	0	6	0	0
21	DF	(Puerto Rico) Colby Quiñones	2	0	0	0	0	0	0	0	0	0	0	0	2	0	0
22	FW	(Cape Verde) Walter Varela	5	0	0	0	0	0	0	0	0	0	0	0	5	0	0
23	GK	(United States) Kash Oladapo	0	0	0	0	0	0	1	0	1	0	0	0	1	0	1
45	DF	(France) Séga Coulibaly	1	0	0	0	0	0	0	0	0	0	0	0	1	0	0
47	MF	(Trinidad and Tobago) Nathaniel James	1	0	0	0	0	0	0	0	0	1	0	0	2	0	0
50	DF	(Somalia) Mo Mohamed	1	0	0	0	0	0	1	0	0	0	0	0	2	0	0
66	MF	(Jamaica) Kemali Green	5	0	0	0	0	0	0	0	0	2	0	0	7	0	0
77	MF	(Japan) Masashi Wada	7	1	0	0	0	0	0	0	0	0	0	0	6	0	0
80	MF	(Sierra Leone) Jay Tee Kamara	2	0	1	0	0	0	0	0	0	1	0	0	3	0	1
90	MF	(United States) Khalid Hersi	0	0	0	0	0	0	0	0	0	0	0	0	0	0	0
99	FW	(Norway) Noah Kvifte	0	0	0	0	0	0	0	0	0	0	0	0	0	0	0
	Head Coach	(United States) Bobby Murphy	6	0	0	0	0	0	1	0	0	0	0	0	7	0	0
Total			92	2	1	8	2	0	9	0	1	6	0	0	115	4	2

== Honors and awards ==
=== USL League One Annual Awards ===
==== All-League honorees ====
Team	Position	Player	Ref.
First	DF	(England) Nathan Messer	
First	MF	(Japan) Masashi Wada	
Second	FW	(England) Ollie Wright	

- Comeback Player of the Year: (United States) Mikey Lopez
- Goal of the Year: (Trinidad and Tobago) Nathaniel James
- Save of the Year: (United States) Hunter Morse

=== Club Honors ===
Award	Recipient	Position	Source
Most Valuable Player	(United States) Hunter Morse	GK	
Supporter's Player of the Year	(England) Ollie Wright	FW	
Rookie of the Year	(United States) Titus Washington	FW	
Rookie of the Year	(Jamaica) Kemali Green	DF	
Lead With Your Heart Community Award	(United States) Mikey Lopez	MF	

=== USL League One Player of the Month ===
Week	Player	Ref
August	(England) Ollie Wright	

=== USL League One Player of the Week ===
Week	Player	Opponent	Ref
15	(England) Ollie Wright	Union Omaha	
26	(England) Ollie Wright	Charlotte Independence	

=== USL League One Team of the Week ===
Week	Player	Opponent	Position	Ref
6	(United States) Patrick Langlois	South Georgia Tormenta FC	Bench	
9	(England) Nathan Messer	One Knoxville SC	DF	
9	(Japan) Masashi Wada	One Knoxville SC	Bench	
9	(United States) Azaad Liadi	One Knoxville SC	Bench	
10	(United States) Azaad Liadi	Union Omaha	Bench	
11	(Cape Verde) Walter Varela	FC Naples	MF	
12	(England) Nathan Messer	Forward Madison FC	DF	
12	(England) Ollie Wright	Forward Madison FC	Bench	
15	(United States) Hunter Morse	Union Omaha	GK	
15	(England) Ollie Wright	Union Omaha	MF	
15	(Trinidad and Tobago) Michel Poon-Angeron	Union Omaha	Bench	
16	(England) Ollie Wright	AV Alta	MF	
16	(United States) Azaad Liadi	AV Alta	FW	
17/18	(Sierra Leone) Jay Tee Kamara	AV Alta, South Georgia Tormenta FC	Bench	
19	(United States) Hunter Morse	Texoma FC	GK	
19	(England) Ollie Wright	Texoma FC	Bench	
19	(Japan) Masashi Wada	Texoma FC	Bench	
20	(United States) Titus Washington	Greenville Triumph, Charlotte Independence	FW	
20	(United States) Hunter Morse	Greenville Triumph, Charlotte Independence	Bench	
23	(United States) Hunter Morse	Richmond Kickers	GK	
23	(Puerto Rico) Colby Quiñones	Richmond Kickers	Bench	
25	(Cape Verde) Walter Varela	Westchester SC	FW	
25	(England) Ollie Wright	Westchester SC	FW	
25	(United States) Nathan Messer	Westchester SC	Bench	
25	(United States) Titus Washington	Westchester SC	Bench	
26	(England) Ollie Wright	Charlotte Independence	MF	
26	(Trinidad and Tobago) Michel Poon-Angeron	Charlotte Independence	MF	
26	(United States) Sean Vinberg	Charlotte Independence	DF	
26	(Sierra Leone) Jay Tee Kamara	Charlotte Independence	Bench	
26	(Japan) Masashi Wada	Charlotte Independence	Bench	
27	(United States) Mikey Lopez	Greenville Triumph SC	DF	
27	(Sierra Leone) Jay Tee Kamara	Greenville Triumph SC	MF	
28	(England) Nathan Messer	Chattanooga Red Wolves SC	DF	
28	(Jamaica) Kemali Green	Chattanooga Red Wolves SC	Bench	
29	(Japan) Masashi Wada	Richmond Kickers, FC Naples	MF	
29	(England) Ollie Wright	Richmond Kickers, FC Naples	Bench	
30	(England) Ollie Wright	Texoma FC	MF	
30	(England) Nathan Messer	Texoma FC	Bench	
32	(Trinidad and Tobago) Michel Poon-Angeron	One Knoxville SC	Bench	
33	(England) Ollie Wright	Westchester SC	MF	
34	(England) Nathan Messer	Spokane Velocity	DF	
34	(England) Ollie Wright	Spokane Velocity	MF	
34	(Sierra Leone) Jay Tee Kamara	Spokane Velocity	MF	
34	(Trinidad and Tobago) Nathaniel James	Spokane Velocity	Bench	

=== USL Jägermeister Cup Team of the Round ===
Round	Player	Opponent	Position	Ref
2	(Sierra Leone) Jay Tee Kamara	Detroit City FC	MF	
2	(Trinidad and Tobago) Nathaniel James	Detroit City FC	Bench	
2	(United States) Bobby Murphy	Detroit City FC	Coach	

=== USL League One Goal of the Week ===
Week	Player	Opponent	Ref
15	(England) Ollie Wright	Union Omaha	
16	(United States) Azaad Liadi	AV Alta	
26	(United States) Sean Vinberg	Charlotte Independence	
30	(England) Nathan Messer	Texoma FC	
34	(Trinidad and Tobago) Nathaniel James	Spokane Velocity	

=== USL League One Save of the Week ===
Week	Player	Opponent	Ref
9	(United States) Hunter Morse	One Knoxville SC	
23	(United States) Hunter Morse	Richmond Kickers	
29	(United States) Hunter Morse	Richmond Kickers	

=== USL League One Coach of the Month ===
Month	Coach	Ref
May	(United States) Bobby Murphy	
