= Masashi Wada =

Japanese footballer (born 1997)

Masashi Wada 和田 昌士
Personal information
- Full name: Masashi Wada
- Date of birth: 11 April 1997 (age 29)
- Place of birth: Yokohama, Japan
- Height: 1.77 m (5 ft 10 in)
- Position: Forward

Team information
- Current team: Portland Hearts of Pine
- Number: 77

Youth career
- 2010–2015: Yokohama F. Marinos

Senior career*
Years	Team	Apps	(Gls)
2016–2019	Yokohama F. Marinos	1	(0)
2017	→ Renofa Yamaguchi FC (loan)	17	(1)
2019	→ Blaublitz Akita (loan)	30	(4)
2020–2021	SC Sagamihara	53	(5)
2021	→ Iwate Grulla Morioka (loan)	10	(4)
2022–2023	Iwate Grulla Morioka	72	(13)
2024	Thespa Gunma	27	(0)
2025–	Portland Hearts of Pine	31	(10)
Medal record
Yokohama F. Marinos
Runner-up	J.League Cup	2018
- * Club domestic league appearances and goals as of 26 April 2026 (UTC)

Masashi Wada (和田 昌士, Wada Masashi; born 11 April 1997 in Yokohama) is a Japanese footballer who plays as a forward for USL League One club Portland Hearts of Pine.

A product of the Yokohama F. Marinos academy, Wada has also played for Renofa Yamaguchi, Blaublitz Akita, SC Sagamihara, Iwate Grulla Morioka and Thespa Gunma.

== Career ==
In 2014, Wada trained with Manchester City.

On 2 September 2015, it was announced that Wada would be promoted to the Yokohama F. Marinos first team from the 2016 season. On 23 March 2016, he made his professional debut against Kawasaki Frontale in the J.League Cup.

On 7 January 2017, Wada was announced at Renofa Yamaguchi on a one year loan deal.

On 27 December 2018, Wada was announced at Blaublitz Akita on a one year loan deal. On 13 January 2020, Yokohama F.Marinos announced that his contract would not be renewed for the 2020 season.

On 15 January 2020, Wada was announced at SC Sagamihara on a permanent transfer.

On 7 August 2021, Wada was announced at Iwate Grulla Morioka on a six month loan deal. At the end of the season, he joined the club on a permanent transfer.

On 31 December 2023, Wada was announced at Thespa Gunma on a permanent transfer. On 16 November 2024, the club announced he would be leaving the club at the expiration of his contract.

On 5 March 2025, Wada signed for USL League One club Portland Hearts of Pine. He joined up with the club in April. He scored the club's first home goal in league play on 5 May against One Knoxville SC. He scored a hat trick on 17 September against Richmond Kickers. Following the conclusion of the regular season, Wada was named as part of USL League One's All-League 1st Team, along with Hearts of Pine teammate Nathan Messer. Following the season, Hearts of Pine head coach Bobby Murphy revealed that the club had renegotiated Wada's contract, signing him for two additional seasons. On April 11, 2026, during the first home game match of the season, Wada sustained a major lower leg injury that resulted in him undergoing surgery. The Hearts of Pine subsequently announced that he is not expected to play for the remainder of the 2026 season.

== Style of play ==
Wada has been described as having a good understanding of the game, along with having experience on the ball.

== Personal life ==
Wada's younger brother is Koji Wada, who currently plays for Iwate Grulla Morioka.

== Club statistics ==
Updated to 25 November 2025.

Club performance			League		Cup		League Cup		Total	
Season	Club	League	Apps	Goals	Apps	Goals	Apps	Goals	Apps	Goals
Japan			League		Emperor's Cup		J. League Cup		Total	
2016	Yokohama F. Marinos	J1 League	1	0	1	0	3	0	5	0
2017	Renofa Yamaguchi	J2 League	17	1	0	0	-		17	1
2018	Yokohama F. Marinos	J1 League	0	0	1	0	4	0	5	0
2019	Blaublitz Akita	J3 League	30	4	1	0	-		31	4
2020	SC Sagamihara	J3 League	33	4	-		-		33	4
2021	SC Sagamihara	J2 League	20	1	2	1	-		22	2
2021	Iwate Grulla Morioka	J3 League	10	4	-		-		10	4
2022	Iwate Grulla Morioka	J2 League	37	2	1	1	-		38	3
2023	Iwate Grulla Morioka	J3 League	35	11	1	0	-		36	11
2024	Thespa Gunma	J2 League	27	0	0	0	1	2	28	2
United States			League		U.S. Open Cup		USL Cup		Total	
2025	Portland Hearts of Pine	USL League One	27 (Note: Includes an appearance in the 2025 USL League One playoffs.)	9	1	0	4	0	32	9
Career Total			237	36	8	2	12	2	257	40

== Honours ==
=== Individual ===
USL League One All-League 1st Team: 2025
