= Walter Varela =

Cape Verdean footballer (born 1997)

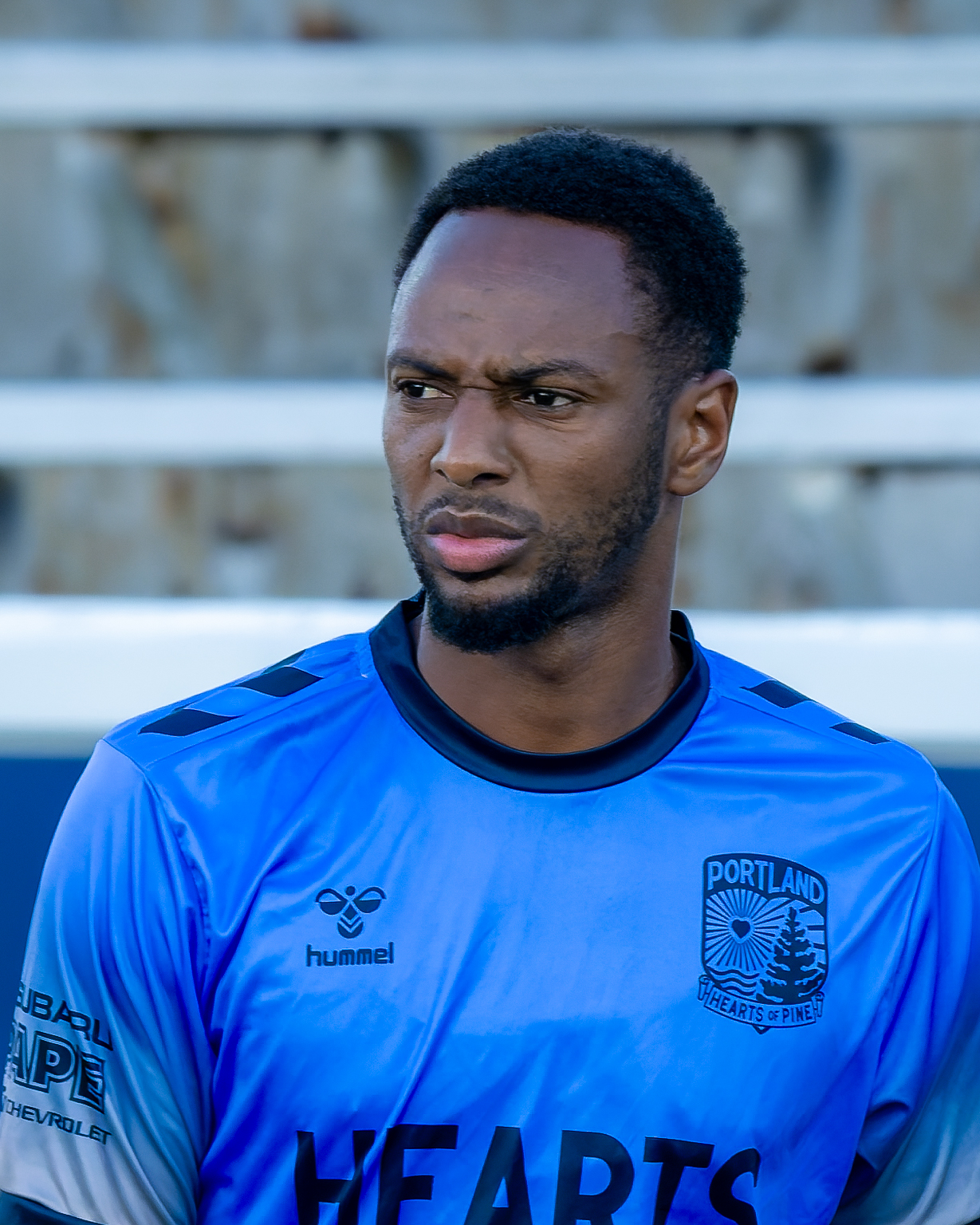
- Varela with Portland in 2026

Personal information
- Full name: Walter Elias Furtado Varela
- Date of birth: March 20, 1997 (age 29)
- Place of birth: Praia, Cape Verde
- Position: Winger

Team information
- Current team: Portland Hearts of Pine
- Number: 7

College career
Years	Team	Apps	(Gls)
2018–2019	BHCC Bulldogs	21	(22)

Senior career*
Years	Team	Apps	(Gls)
2021	Valeo FC	3	(1)
2021	Brockton FC		
2022	Albion San Diego	18	(3)
2023	Chattanooga Red Wolves	18	(1)
2025–	Portland Hearts of Pine	41	(2)
- * Club domestic league appearances and goals as of 25 October 2026

Walter Elias Furtado Varela (also known as Wá) (born 20 March 1997) is a Cape Verdean professional footballer who plays as a winger for Portland Hearts of Pine in the USL League One.

== Career ==
=== College and amateur ===
Varela immigrated to the United States at age 20. He began his career playing college soccer at Bunker Hill Community College in Boston, Massachusetts, where he was named to the collegiate Division III All-American Team in 2018. He played two seasons with the Bulldogs, scoring 22 goals in 21 appearances, also tallying four assists.

In 2021, Varela had spells in the National Premier Soccer League with Valeo FC and in the United Premier Soccer League with Brockton FC.

=== Professional ===
In 2022, Varela competed in the National Independent Soccer Association with Albion San Diego, scoring three goals in 19 appearances in all competitions. Following the 2022, Varela was named to the 2022 NISA Best XI Second Team.

On 25 January 2023, Varela signed with USL League One club Chattanooga Red Wolves ahead of their 2023 season.

On 8 February 2025, Varela joined USL League One expansion team Portland Hearts of Pine ahead of their inaugural season. He made his debut for the club in its first match, against CD Faialense of the Bay State Soccer League in the U.S. Open Cup, on his birthday, March 20. He marked the occasion by scoring the first goal in Hearts of Pine history in what was ultimately a 4–0 win. He returned to the Hearts of Pine for their second season, but missed the beginning of the season due to hernia surgery. The injury had kept him out of the final six regular season matches of the 2025 season, as well as both playoff matches.
