= Sean Vinberg =

American soccer player (born 1994)

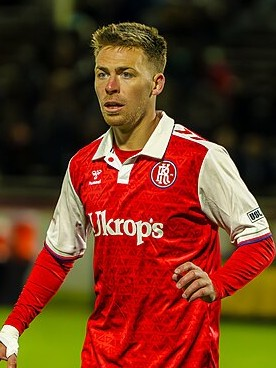
- Vinberg with the Richmond Kickers in 2026

Personal information
- Date of birth: September 29, 1994 (age 32)
- Place of birth: New York City, New York, United States
- Position: Defender

Team information
- Current team: Richmond Kickers
- Number: 22

College career
Years	Team	Apps	(Gls)
2012–2016	SUNY Oneonta	76	(6)

Senior career*
Years	Team	Apps	(Gls)
2016	Greater Binghamton FC		
2016	Greek American AA		
2017–2018	Khoromkhon FC		
2018	Niendorfer TSV	4	(0)
2018–2019	SC Condor Hamburg	25	(5)
2019–2020	Meiendorfer SV	19	(1)
2020–2021	Heider SV	4	(0)
2021–2023	Phönix Lübeck	25	(1)
2023–2024	VfR Neumünster	17	(8)
2024	Central Valley Fuego	7	(1)
2025	Portland Hearts of Pine	30	(1)
2026–	Richmond Kickers	23	(2)
- * Club domestic league appearances and goals as of November 2, 2026

Sean Paul Vinberg (born September 29, 1994) is an American professional soccer player who plays as a defender for Richmond Kickers in USL League One.

== Early life and career ==
Sean Vinberg was born in New York City in 1994, and was raised in Massapequa Park on Long Island. He attended college at State University of New York at Oneonta, where he played for the varsity men's soccer team all four years. After spending time with amateur New York teams Greater Binghamton FC and Greek American AA, he went overseas to pursue a professional career.

== Professional career ==
=== Khoromkhon FC and Germany ===
Vinberg received his first professional contract from Khoromkhon FC of the Mongolian Premier League.

Following a single season in Mongolia with the Yellows, Vinberg moved to Germany, playing for a number of clubs over the next seven seasons. First, he played for Niendorfer TSV in Hamburg's Oberliga Hamburg for the latter half of the 2017–18 season, then SC Condor Hamburg in the same division for 2018–19. He joined Meiendorfer SV, also in Oberliga Hamburg, for 2019–20. He moved to Heider SV in Regionalliga Nord in January 2020.

In 2021, he moved to 1. FC Phönix Lübeck also in the Regionalliga Nord, spending two seasons with Phönix. He departed in 2023 for VfR Neumünster in Oberliga Schleswig-Holstein. He concluded his time with VfR with eight goals in 17 league appearances.

=== Return to the United States ===
Following the conclusion of the European season, Vinberg returned to the United States, signing for USL League One side Central Valley Fuego FC during the 2024 USL League One season. He made seven appearances and scored one goal with the Fuego before the conclusion of the American season, scoring the only goal in a 1–0 victory against Spokane Velocity on October 9.

After the Fuego departed USL League One, Vinberg remained in the league, signing for expansion club Portland Hearts of Pine on February 8, 2025, ahead of the team's inaugural season. He made his debut for the Hearts of Pine in the club's first ever competitive match on April 3, a 4–0 victory over CD Faialense in the U.S. Open Cup. He scored his first goal with the Hearts of Pine in a 4–2 win over Charlotte Independence on August 30.

He departed the Hearts of Pine after the 2025 season. For 2026, he remained in USL League One by joining the Richmond Kickers. He made his debut for the club in 1–1 draw against AV Alta.
