= Samuel Mahlamäki Camacho =

Finnish footballer (born 1996)

Personal information
- Date of birth: 3 April 1996 (age 30)
- Place of birth: Finland
- Height: 1.84 m (6 ft 0 in)
- Position: Centre back

Team information
- Current team: Alta IF
- Number: 4

Youth career
- Kuusysi

Senior career*
Years	Team	Apps	(Gls)
2015–2016	Lahti Akatemia	13	(1)
2016	→ Käpylän Pallo (loan)	2	(0)
2017	PS Kemi	2	(1)
2017	→ TP-47 (loan)	7	(0)
2018	KTP	13	(0)
2019	AC Kajaani	23	(0)
2020	VPS	18	(0)
2021	TPS	1	(0)
2021	Assyriska IK	13	(0)
2022	KTP	13	(1)
2023	KPV	20	(0)
2024	Flota Świnoujście	25	(0)
2025	Portland Hearts of Pine	4	(0)
2025–	Alta IF	13	(0)
- * Club domestic league appearances and goals as of 3 November 2025

Samuel Mahlamäki Camacho (born 3 April 1996) is a Finnish professional football player who plays as a centre back for Norwegian Second Division club Alta IF.

== Club career ==
Mahlamäki Camacho played in the youth sector of Kuusysi in Lahti. In January 2018, he signed with KTP in second-tier Ykkönen.

After a stint with AC Kajaani, he signed with Vaasan Palloseura in January 2020.

In March 2023, he joined KPV Kokkola.

In 2024, he played for Flota Świnoujście in Poland.

On 14 January 2025, Mahlamäki Camacho moved to the United States and signed with Portland Hearts of Pine in USL League One. On 15 July, after making eight appearances across all competitions with the Hearts of Pine, the club announced that Mahlamäki Camacho had agreed to a mutual termination of his contract. He signed with Alta IF in the Norwegian Second Division later that month.

== Personal life ==
Mahlamäki Camacho is of Cuban descent through his mother, and has a Finnish father. He spent his youth in São Paulo, Brazil.

== Career statistics ==
As of 15 July 2025

Appearances and goals by club, season and competition
Club	Season	League			National cup (Note: Includes Suomen Cup and U.S. Open Cup)		League cup (Note: Includes Finnish League Cup and USL Cup)		Total	
Club	Season	Division	Apps	Goals	Apps	Goals	Apps	Goals	Apps	Goals
Lahti Akatemia	2015	Kakkonen	2	0	–		–		2	0
Lahti Akatemia	2016	Kakkonen	11	1	2	1	–		13	2
Lahti Akatemia	Total		13	1	2	1	0	0	15	2
Käpylän Pallo (loan)	2016	Kakkonen	2	0	–		–		2	0
PS Kemi	2017	Veikkausliiga	0	0	2	0	–		2	0
FC Kemi	2017	Kolmonen	2	1	–		–		2	1
TP-47 (loan)	2017	Kakkonen	7	0	2	0	–		9	0
TP-47 II (loan)	2017	Kolmonen	1	0	–		–		1	0
KTP	2018	Ykkönen	13	0	4	0	–		17	0
AC Kajaani	2019	Ykkönen	23	0	4	0	–		27	0
VPS	2020	Ykkönen	18	0	5	0	–		23	0
TPS	2021	Ykkönen	1	0	3	0	–		4	0
TPS U23	2021	Kolmonen	4	0	–		–		4	0
Assyriska IK	2021	Ettan	13	0	–		–		13	0
KTP	2022	Ykkönen	13	1	3	0	3 (Note: Includes Ykköscup)	0	19	1
Peli-Karhut	2022	Kakkonen	1	0	–		–		1	0
KPV	2023	Ykkönen	21	0	3	0	1	0	25	0
Flota Świnoujście	2023–24	III liga	14	0	–		–		14	0
Flota Świnoujście	2024–25	III liga	11	0	–		–		11	0
Flota Świnoujście	Total		25	0	0	0	0	0	25	0
Portland Hearts of Pine	2025	USL League One	4	0	2	0	2	0	8	0
Alta IF	2025	2. divisjon	0	0	0	0	–		0	0
Career total			161	3	30	1	6	0	199	4
