= Jay Tee Kamara =

Sierra Leonean footballer (born 2002)

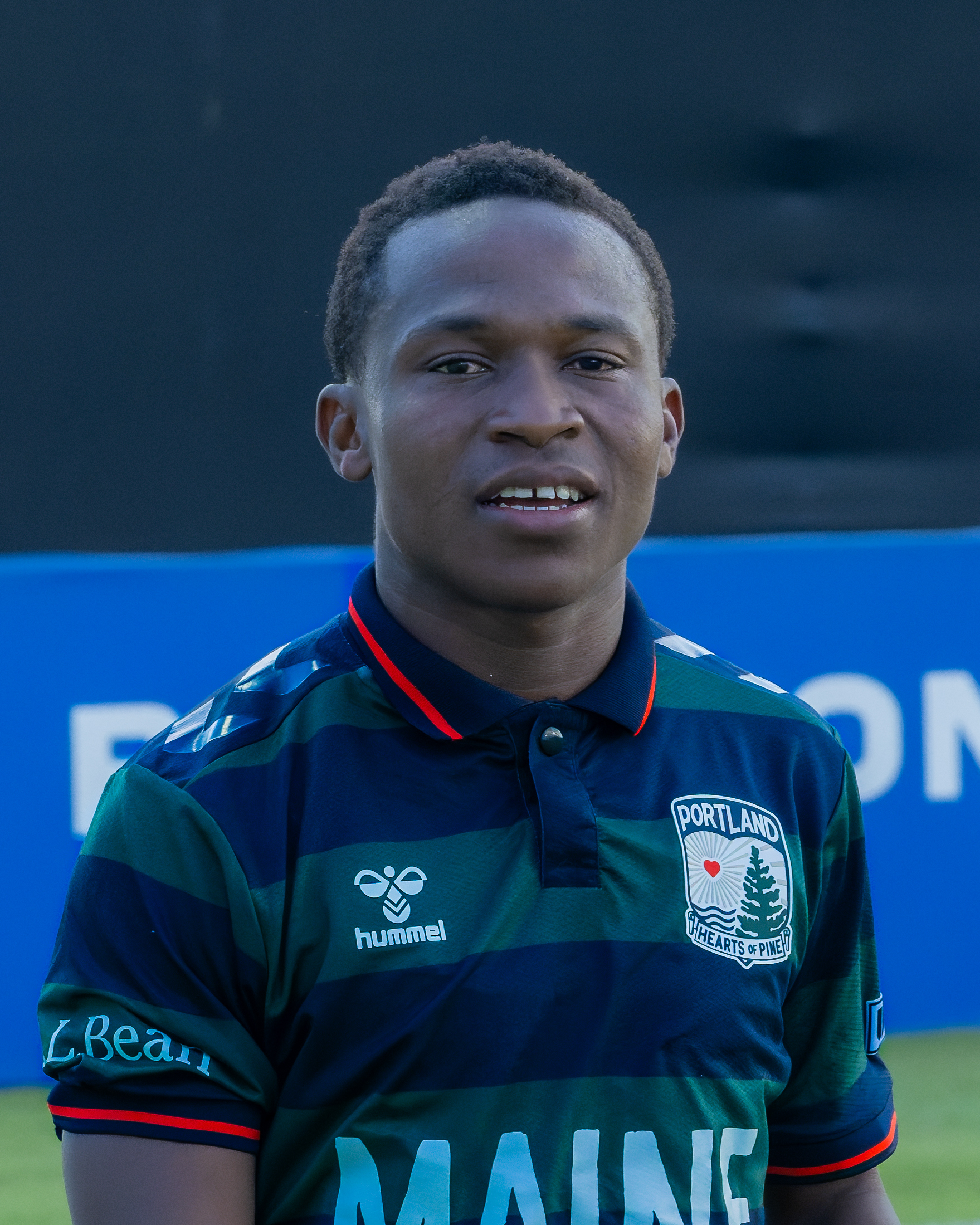
- Kamara with Portland in 2026

Personal information
- Full name: John Thomas Kamara
- Date of birth: 10 May 2002 (age 24)
- Place of birth: Freetown, Sierra Leone
- Height: 5 ft 3 in (1.60 m)
- Position: Midfielder

Team information
- Current team: Portland Hearts of Pine
- Number: 11

Youth career
- Alaska FC
- Montverde Academy

Senior career*
Years	Team	Apps	(Gls)
2021–2022	Louisville City	0	(0)
2021	→ North Carolina FC (loan)	21	(4)
2022	Columbus Crew 2	9	(0)
2023–2024	Ljungskile SK	42	(8)
2024–2025	Sandvikens IF	8	(0)
2025–	Portland Hearts of Pine	52	(9)

International career^{‡}
2026–	Sierra Leone	1	(0)
- * Club domestic league appearances and goals as of 25 October 2026 ‡ National team caps and goals as of 5 April 2026

John Thomas "Jay Tee" Kamara (born 10 May 2002) is a Sierra Leonean professional footballer who plays as a midfielder for USL League One team Portland Hearts of Pine and the Sierra Leone national football team.

== Club career ==
Kamara began his career with Alaska FC in his hometown of Freetown before attending Montverde Academy in Montverde, Florida, United States. On January 27, 2021, after his graduation from Montverde, Kamara joined USL Championship club Louisville City.

On 13 April 2021, Kamara was loaned out to USL League One club North Carolina FC for the 2021 season. He made his professional debut for the club on 8 May against Greenville Triumph, starting in the 2–1 defeat.

On February 18, 2022, Kamara was transferred to Columbus Crew 2, the reserve side of Major League Soccer's Columbus Crew, ahead of their inaugural MLS Next Pro season.

After the season, Kamara moved to Sweden, joining Ljungskile SK in the third-tier Ettan Fotboll. He stayed there for a season and a half before moving to Sandvikens IF in the second-tier Superettan in August 2024.

In 2025, Kamara returned to the United States to join Portland Hearts of Pine in USL League One. Due to visa issues, Kamara didn't join the team until mid-May, two months into the League One season. He made his Hearts of Pine debut on 17 May against FC Naples, scoring a goal in a 2–1 Hearts of Pine victory. He scored a goal in a 2–2 2025 USL League One playoffs semi-final draw against Spokane Velocity, but missed a penalty in the subsequent penalty shootout that saw Spokane advance to the League One Final.

== International career ==
Kamara was called up to the Sierra Leone national football team on 20 March 2026. He made his debut in a match against the Azerbaijan national team on 30 March 2026, coming on as an 86th minute substitute in a 1–1 friendly draw that Azerbaijan won in a penalty shootout. Kamara scored his penalty.

== Career statistics ==
As of match played 25 October 2025

Appearances and goals by club, season and competition
Club	Season	League			National Cup		Continental		Total	
Club	Season	Division	Apps	Goals	Apps	Goals	Apps	Goals	Apps	Goals
Louisville City	2021	USL Championship	0	0	0	0	—		0	0
North Carolina FC (loan)	2021	USL League One	21	4	0	0	—		21	4
Columbus Crew 2	2022	MLS Next Pro	9	0	0	0	—		9	0
Ljungskile SK	2023	Ettan	27	5	0	0	—		27	5
Ljungskile SK	2024	Ettan	15	3	0	0	—		15	3
Sandvikens IF	2024	Superettan	8	0	1	0	—		9	0
Portland Hearts of Pine	2025	USL League One	25 (Note: Includes one appearance in the USL League One playoffs)	6 (Note: Includes one goal scored in the USL League One playoffs)	3 (Note: Includes three appearances in the 2025 USL Cup)	2 (Note: Includes two goals scored in the 2025 USL Cup)	—		28	8
Career total			115	18	4	2	0	0	109	20
