= Ollie Wright (footballer, born 1999) =

English footballer (born 1999)

Personal information
- Full name: Oliver Ephraim Wright
- Date of birth: 1 March 1999 (age 27)
- Place of birth: London, England
- Position: Attacking midfielder

Team information
- Current team: Portland Hearts of Pine
- Number: 10

Youth career
- c. 2015: CB Hounslow United
- Fulham
- 2016–2017: Brentford

College career
Years	Team	Apps	(Gls)
2017–2020	St. Mary's Rattlers	55	(13)

Senior career*
Years	Team	Apps	(Gls)
2019	Corpus Christi FC	14	(7)
2021	San Antonio FC	14	(0)
2022	Rio Grande Valley FC	4	(0)
2023–2024	Huntsville City FC	51	(3)
2025–	Portland Hearts of Pine	53	(15)
- * Club domestic league appearances and goals as of 22 September 2026

Oliver Ephraim Wright (born 1 March 1999) is an English professional footballer who plays as an attacking midfielder for Portland Hearts of Pine in the USL League One.

== Youth career ==
Born in London, England, Wright spent time with CB Hounslow United, the Brentford CST, and in the Fulham and Queens Park Rangers academies.

== College and amateur career ==
In 2016, Wright moved to the United States to play college soccer at St. Mary's University, Texas. Wright made 55 appearances, scoring 13 goals and tallying 20 assists over three seasons with the Rattlers. During his time in college, Wright was named All-Heartland Conference Third Team in 2018, and in 2019 was named Lone Star Conference Player of the Year, Lone Star Conference Midfielder of the Year, South Central Region Player of the Year and D2CCA and United Soccer Coaches All-American.

In 2019, Wright played with USL League Two side Corpus Christi FC, where he scored seven goals and 15 assists in just 14 appearances, setting the League Two single-season assist record.

== Professional career ==
=== San Antonio FC ===
On 15 December 2020, it was announced Wright would join USL Championship side San Antonio FC on a two-year deal ahead of their 2021 season. He made his professional debut on 1 May 2021, appearing as an 85th-minute substitute during a 3–0 win over Colorado Springs Switchbacks.

=== Rio Grande Valley FC ===
Wright signed with USL Championship side Rio Grande Valley FC on 23 February 2022. An injury suffered in the preseason leading up to the 2022 season kept him on the sidelines for the majority of the year, and he only returned to full fitness in time for the last four games.

=== Huntsville City FC ===
In January 2023, Wright signed for MLS Next Pro expansion side Huntsville City FC. During his two seasons there, he became the leader in both appearances for the club (51) as well as assists (13), and he won the club's inaugural Supporters' Player of the Year award after the 2023 season.

=== Portland Hearts of Pine ===
On 28 December 2024, Wright signed for USL League One expansion side Portland Hearts of Pine. He made his debut in the club's first ever match, a 4–0 win against CD Faialense in the U.S. Open Cup on 20 March 2025. On 31 May, he scored his first goal for the Hearts of Pine in a 4–2 victory over Detroit City FC in the USL Cup, in front of his father Roy, who travelled from London to Maine to watch the match. Following the match, Wright called it the best moment of his career in a tweet.

On 15 June 2025, Wright notched his first professional hat trick and the first hat trick in Hearts of Pine history, scoring all three goals in a 3–1 home win over Union Omaha. Following this performance, he was named USL League One player of the week, the first Hearts of Pine player ever to receive the honour. He received the USL Players' Association's League One Player of the Month award for June 2025, the first Hearts of Pine player to win the award. After the conclusion of the regular season, Wright was named to League One's All-League 2nd team and the USL Players Association Best XI while being given the inaugural Hearts of Pine Supporters Player of the Year award.

Wright's second season in Portland was curtailed with a season-ending knee injury on 19 September 2026. At the time of his injury, Wright had scored eight goals across all competitions, joint-most for the team.

== Honours ==
Individual

- Huntsville City FC Supporters' Player of the Year: 2023
- USL League One All-League 2nd Team: 2025
- USLPA Player's Choice Best XI: 2025
- Portland Hearts of Pine Supporters' Player of the Year: 2025
