= Nathaniel James (footballer) =

Trinidadian footballer (born 2004)

Natty James
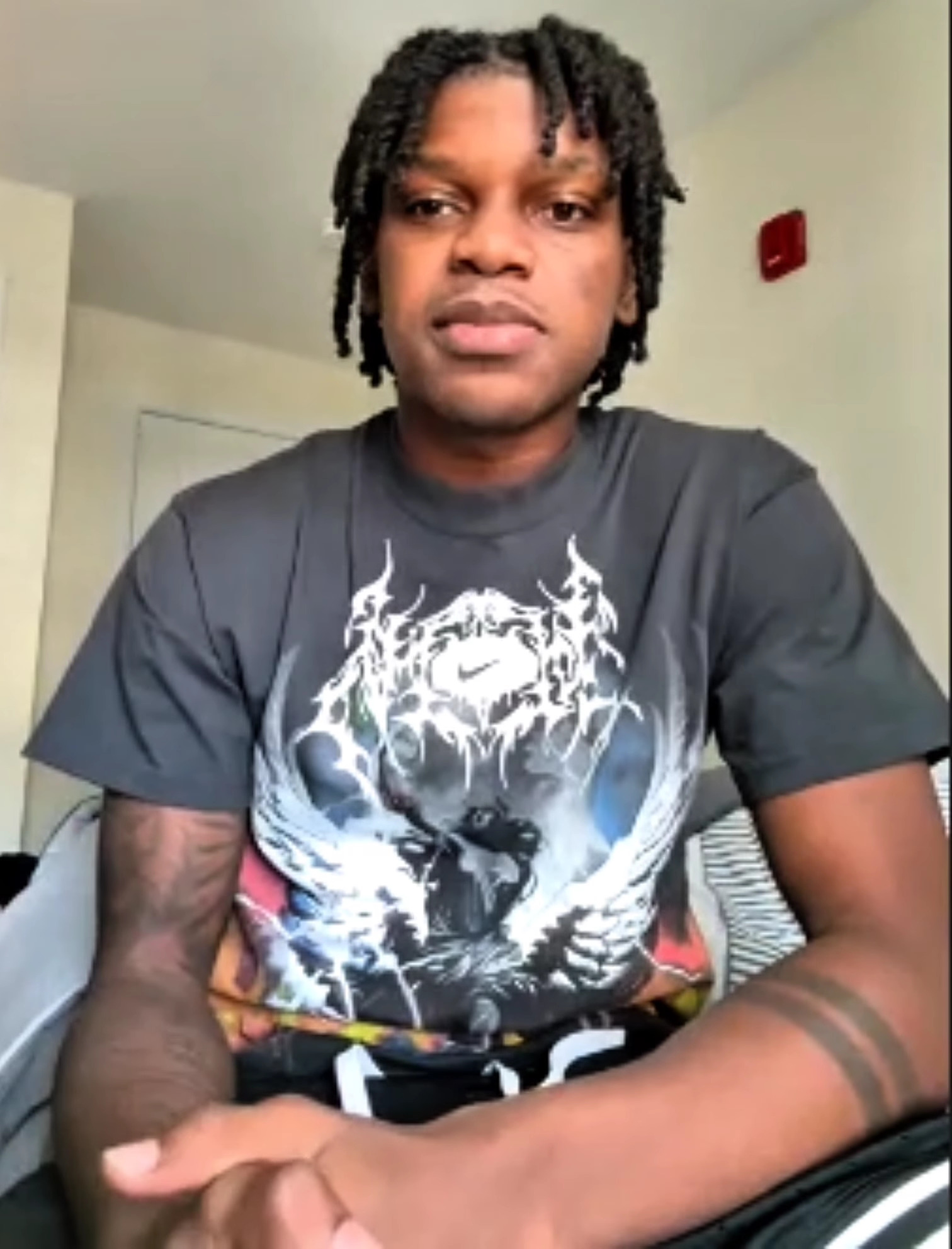
- James in 2025

Personal information
- Full name: Nathaniel Mark James
- Date of birth: 17 June 2004 (age 22)
- Place of birth: Port of Spain, Trinidad and Tobago
- Height: 1.72 m (5 ft 8 in)
- Position: Midfielder

Team information
- Current team: North Texas SC

Youth career
- 2009: San Juan Jabloteh
- 2019–2020: Queen's Royal College
- 2019–2023: W Connection

Senior career*
Years	Team	Apps	(Gls)
2020–2023	W Connection	6	(1)
2023	Club Sando	22	(15)
2023–2025	Mount Pleasant	31	(0)
2025	Portland Hearts of Pine	15	(3)
2026–	North Texas SC	14	(8)

International career^{‡}
2022	Trinidad and Tobago U-20	4	(4)
2023–	Trinidad and Tobago	16	(5)
- * Club domestic league appearances and goals as of 10 June 2026 ‡ National team caps and goals as of 3 July 2025

Nathaniel Mark "Natty" James (born 17 June 2004) is a Trinidadian footballer who currently plays for MLS Next Pro side North Texas SC and the Trinidad and Tobago national team.

James won the TT Premier Football League Golden Boot in 2023 with Club Sando F.C., scoring 15 goals in 22 appearances, and has previously played professionally for Jamaica Premier League side Mount Pleasant F.A.. He made his professional debut with Trinidadian club W Connection F.C. in 2020 at the age of 15. He moved to the United States by joining USL League One side Portland Hearts of Pine in 2025, winning the league's Goal of the Year award in his sole season with the club. He moved to North Texas SC in 2026.

Born in Port of Spain, James was raised in La Horquetta where his father Mark trained him to become a professional footballer. As a youth, James attended Trinidad's prestigious Queen's Royal College and played for their football team.

== Club career ==
As a youth, he started his career in the academy of San Juan Jabloteh F.C. After studying at Queen's Royal College and playing for their football team, James signed a professional deal with TT Premier Football League team W Connection F.C.. At the age of 15 in 2020, he made a handful of appearances for W Connection's first team and scored a goal before the season was cancelled due to the COVID-19 pandemic in Trinidad and Tobago.

He moved to Club Sando F.C. for the 2023 TT Premier Football League season, where he won the newly-established league's inaugural Golden Boot, scoring 15 times in 22 appearances.

After his season with Club Sando, James moved to Jamaica Premier League side Mount Pleasant F.A. and played for them from 2023 to 2025. He joined Portland Hearts of Pine in 2025, ahead of their inaugural season in USL League One. He made his debut for the Hearts of Pine in a 2–1 defeat to Rhode Island FC in the 2025 U.S. Open Cup, and scored his first goal for the club in his League One debut against Union Omaha on May 10, 2025. His goal came just minutes after being substituted on, and drew the Hearts level in a match that finished 2–2. He scored a brace in a 6–1 victory over Spokane Velocity on 21 October, the first of which was voted as the 2025 USL League One Goal of the Year.

Following the conclusion of the 2025 season, James left the Hearts of Pine and joined North Texas SC, the MLS Next Pro affiliate of Major League Soccer team FC Dallas. He scored a hat trick for North Texas SC on 17 May in a 5–1 win over Sporting Kansas City II.

== National team career ==
James scored four times in as many appearances in the 2022 CONCACAF U-20 Championship. He was subsequently called up to Trinidad and Tobago's senior team, and scored on his debut against Curaçao.

James was named to Trinidad and Tobago's squad for the 2025 CONCACAF Gold Cup.

== Career statistics ==
=== International ===
As of match played 18 November 2025

Appearances and goals by national team and year
National team	Year	Apps	Goals
Trinidad and Tobago	2023	5	2
Trinidad and Tobago	2024	5	1
Trinidad and Tobago	2025	11	3
Total		21	6

Scores and results list Trinidad and Tobago's goal tally first, score column indicates score after each James goal.

List of international goals scored by Nathaniel James
No.	Date	Venue	Opponent	Score	Result	Competition	Ref.
1	7 September 2023	Hasely Crawford Stadium, Port of Spain, Trinidad and Tobago	Curaçao	1–0	1–0	2023–24 CONCACAF Nations League A	
2	13 October 2023	Hasely Crawford Stadium, Port of Spain, Trinidad and Tobago	Guatemala	3–2	3–2	2023–24 CONCACAF Nations League A	
3	8 June 2024	SKNFA Technical Center, Basseterre, Saint Kitts and Nevis	Bahamas	7–0	7–1	2026 FIFA World Cup qualification	
4	25 March 2025	Ato Boldon Stadium, Couva, Trinidad and Tobago	Cuba	4–0	4–0	2025 CONCACAF Gold Cup qualification	
5	6 June 2025	Hasely Crawford Stadium, Port of Spain, Trinidad and Tobago	Saint Kitts and Nevis	6–2	6–2	2026 FIFA World Cup qualification	
6	18 November 2025	Hasely Crawford Stadium, Port of Spain, Trinidad and Tobago	Bermuda	2–2	2–2	2026 FIFA World Cup qualification	

== Honours ==
=== Individual ===
==== Club Sando F.C. ====
- TT Premier Football League Golden Boot: 2023

==== Portland Hearts of Pine ====
- USL League One Goal of the Year: 2025
