= Hunter Morse =

American soccer player (born 1998)

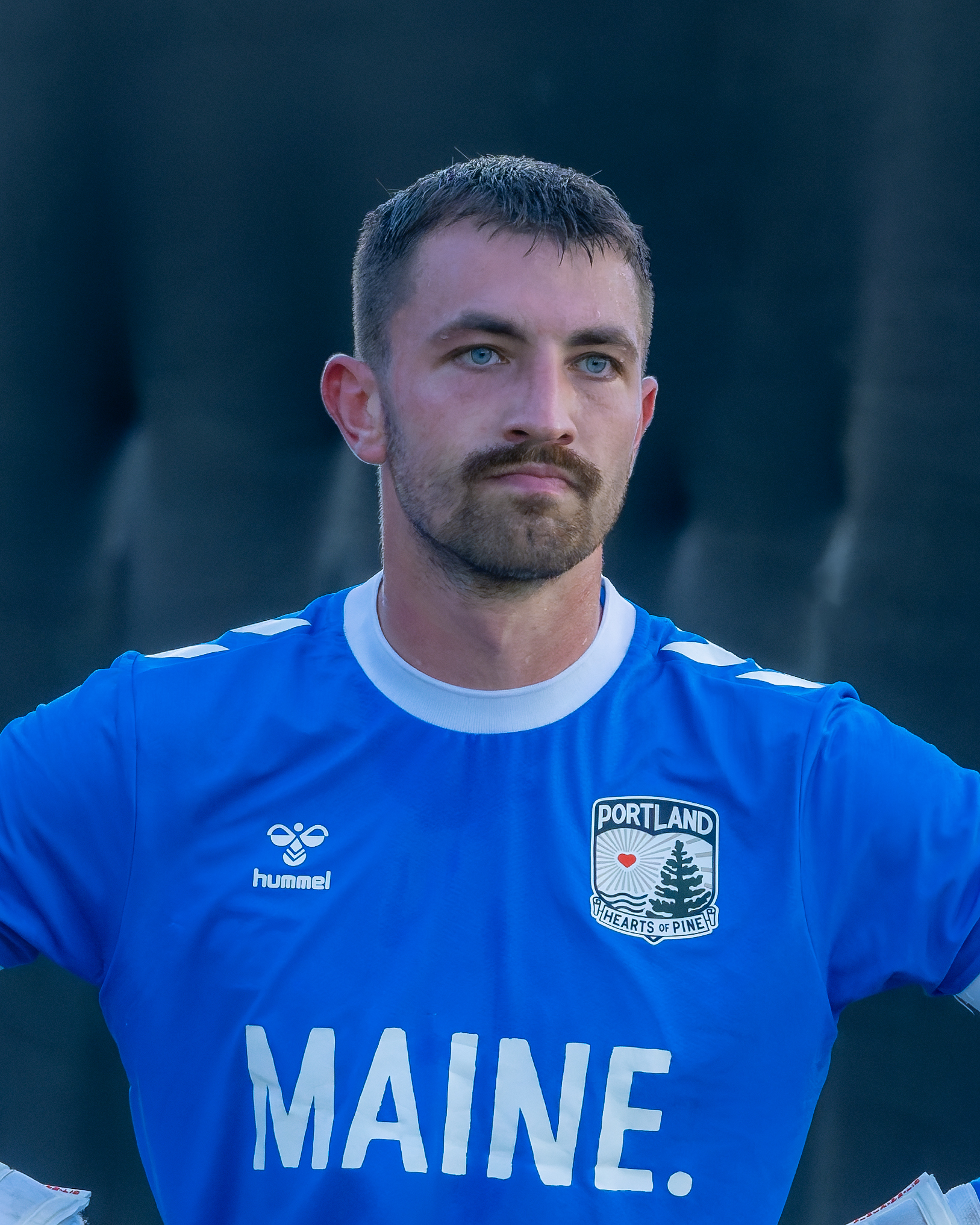
- Morse with Portland in 2026

Personal information
- Full name: Hunter Brant Morse
- Date of birth: October 12, 1998 (age 28)
- Place of birth: Belleville, Michigan, United States
- Height: 6 ft 3 in (1.91 m)
- Position: Goalkeeper

Team information
- Current team: Portland Hearts of Pine
- Number: 1

Youth career
- 2019: Detroit City FC

College career
Years	Team	Apps	(Gls)
2018–2021	Michigan State Spartans	28	(0)
2022	Western Michigan Broncos	21	(0)

Senior career*
Years	Team	Apps	(Gls)
2023–2024	FC Cincinnati	0	(0)
2023–2024	FC Cincinnati 2	12	(0)
2025–	Portland Hearts of Pine	57	(0)
- * Club domestic league appearances and goals as of October 25, 2026

Hunter Brant Morse (born October 12, 1998) is an American professional soccer player who currently plays as a goalkeeper for Portland Hearts of Pine in USL League One. A second-round pick in the 2023 MLS SuperDraft by FC Cincinnati, he previously played for FC Cincinnati 2 of MLS Next Pro.

== Early life and college career ==
Morse was born on October 12, 1998, in Belleville, Michigan and attended Huron High School in New Boston, Michigan. Morse initially played college soccer for the Michigan State Spartans, appearing in 28 matches over four seasons, before transferring to Western Michigan University for an additional season. He was named Mid-American Conference Co-Goalkeeper of the Year, along with Bowling Green's Brendan Graves, in his sole season with the Broncos. Western Michigan also won the Mid-American Conference's championship.

== Club career ==
=== Detroit City FC ===
In 2019, while still a student at Michigan State, Morse played for Detroit City FC, at that point in the National Premier Soccer League and an amateur side. He was the starting keeper for Le Rouge in the 2019 NPSL final, which ended in a victory.

=== FC Cincinnati and FC Cincinnati 2 ===
Morse was drafted 51st overall in the 2023 Major League Soccer SuperDraft by FC Cincinnati. He was signed to their affiliate team in MLS Next Pro, FC Cincinnati 2. He appeared 12 times for FC Cincinnati 2 across the 2023 and 2024 seasons.

=== Portland Hearts of Pine ===
In 2025, he signed for Portland Hearts of Pine in USL League One. He was Portland's primary goalkeeper for their inaugural season, and finished the 2025 season as the league leader in saves (92), and was third in save percentage. He was awarded the 2025 USL League One Save of the Year for a save in an August 9 match against the Richmond Kickers. Morse returned to the Hearts of Pine for the 2026 season.

== Honors and awards ==
=== Detroit City FC ===
- 2019 National Premier Soccer League Champions

=== Western Michigan Broncos ===
- 2022 Mid-American Conference Champions

=== Individual ===
- 2022 Mid-American Conference Co-Goalkeeper of the Year
- 2025 USL League One Save of the Year
