= Kemali Green =

Jamaican footballer (born 2000)

- Green with Portland in 2026

Personal information
- Date of birth: May 18, 2000 (age 26)
- Place of birth: Kingston, Jamaica
- Height: 6 ft 2 in (1.88 m)
- Position: Defender

Team information
- Current team: Portland Hearts of Pine
- Number: 66

College career
Years	Team	Apps	(Gls)
2019	Lock Haven Bald Eagles	15	(1)
2021–2024	Temple Owls	44	(0)

Senior career*
Years	Team	Apps	(Gls)
2025–	Portland Hearts of Pine	47	(1)
- * Club domestic league appearances and goals as of October 25, 2026

Kemali Green (born May 18, 2000) is a Jamaican professional footballer who plays as a defender for the Portland Hearts of Pine in USL League One. Primarily a centre-back, Green has also played in defensive midfield.

== Early life and education ==
Green was born and raised in Kingston, Jamaica, where he began playing soccer at a young age. Green subsequently joined the Philadelphia Union Academy, where he continued his development as a midfielder and defender.

Initially attending Commonwealth University-Lock Haven and playing for the Bald Eagles, he transferred Temple University in Philadelphia in 2021 and played for the Temple Owls men's soccer team, initially as a midfielder. During his collegiate career, Green became a key member of Temple's defense. He started every game in both 2023 and 2024 and was named second-team American Athletic Conference All-Conference in 2024. He was also named AAC Defensive Player of the Week twice and received two Philadelphia Soccer Six honors.

== Career ==
On January 17, 2025, Green signed his first professional contract with Portland Hearts of Pine ahead of the club's inaugural USL League One season. Green quickly established himself as a regular starter at center-back during Portland's inaugural season. In the 2025 USL League One regular season, he made 17 appearances and 17 starts, playing 1,501 minutes and recording one goal and one assist.

He was also recognized by the club at the end of its inaugural season, being named a co-recipient of the club's Rookie of the Year award along with forward Titus Washington.

He returned to the Hearts for the 2026 season.

== Personal life ==
Green is a childhood friend of fellow Philadelphia Union Academy alumnus Zion Scarlett. Scarlett later joined Portland Hearts of Pine and cited Green's positive experience with the club as an influence on his decision to move to Portland.

== Honors ==
Individual

- Temple: AAC All-Conference
- Portland Hearts of Pine Rookie of the Year: 2025 (co-recipient)
