= Don Roux Field =

Multi-purpose stadium in Lewiston, Maine, US

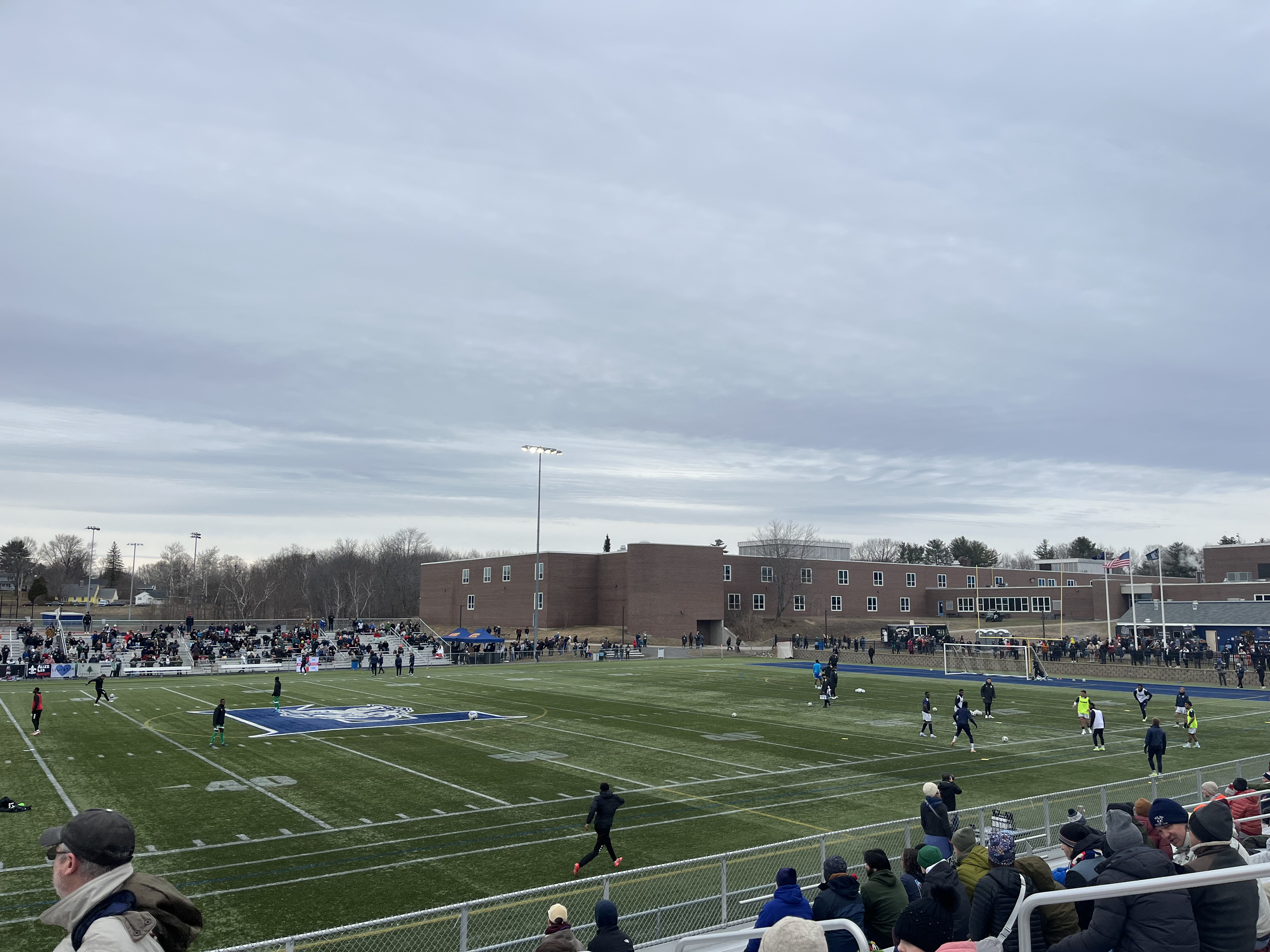
- Don Roux Field hosting the Portland Hearts of Pine in the 2025 U.S. Open Cup
- Interactive map of Don Roux Field
- Location: Lewiston, Maine, United States
- Coordinates: 44.0930°N 70.2039°W

Construction
- Opened: 2018

Tenant
- Lewiston Blue Devils football

Don Roux Field is a multi-purpose outdoor stadium in Lewiston, Maine, United States. Built in 2018, it is named after Don Roux, a graduate of Lewiston High School who won two state championships with the team.

The stadium hosts Maine's annual Lobster Bowl All-Star game, which comprises the top high school seniors. In 2025, professional soccer team Portland Hearts of Pine played three U.S. Open Cup matches at the stadium.
