= Portland Hearts of Pine =

Soccer club based in Portland, Maine, US

- Full name: Portland Hearts of Pine
- Nickname: The Hearts
- Short name: POR
- Founded: September 7, 2023; 3 years ago
- Stadium: Fitzpatrick Stadium; Portland, Maine
- Capacity: 5,500
- Coordinates: 43.65802°N 70.27668°W
- Owner(s): The Soccer Club of Maine; Gabe Hoffman-Johnson; Jonathan and Catherine Culley; Tom Caron
- President: Kevin Schohl
- Head coach: Bobby Murphy
- League: USL League One
- 2025: USL League One, 7th of 14; Playoffs: Semi-finals
- Website: heartsofpine.com
Home colors	Away colors	Third colors

The Portland Hearts of Pine is an American professional soccer team based in Portland, Maine, that competes in USL League One, the third tier of the United States soccer league system. Their home field is Fitzpatrick Stadium. The Hearts of Pine are owned by an entity known as The Soccer Club of Maine, which also owns and operates the USL W League team Maine Wildness.

== History ==
=== Founding ===
On September 7, 2023, the United Soccer League announced that the city of Portland, Maine, had been awarded a USL League One expansion team which would start play in the 2025 season. Gabe Hoffman-Johnson, a former soccer player at Dartmouth College and a standout at nearby Falmouth High School, was announced as the club founder, with the ownership group including local real-estate developers Jonathan and Catherine Culley and NESN broadcaster Tom Caron, a native of Lewiston, Maine.

On April 22, 2024, Kevin Schohl, a former vice president at DraftKings and former executive with AMB Sports and Entertainment, the owner of Major League Soccer club Atlanta United FC, was hired as president and chief business officer.

On September 19, 2024, the team announced that a League One-record 96% of its season ticket deposits had been purchased.

The club named St. Louis City 2 coach Bobby Murphy the team's inaugural head coach and sporting director on November 14, 2024. The club's first player, Trinidadian midfielder Michel Poon-Angeron, was signed on December 17, 2024. The club signed Maine native and Lewiston High School alumnus Khalid Hersi on January 8, 2025.

The team's mascot is Moxie the Moose, a nod to Moxie, the official soft drink of Maine since 2005.

=== Inaugural season ===
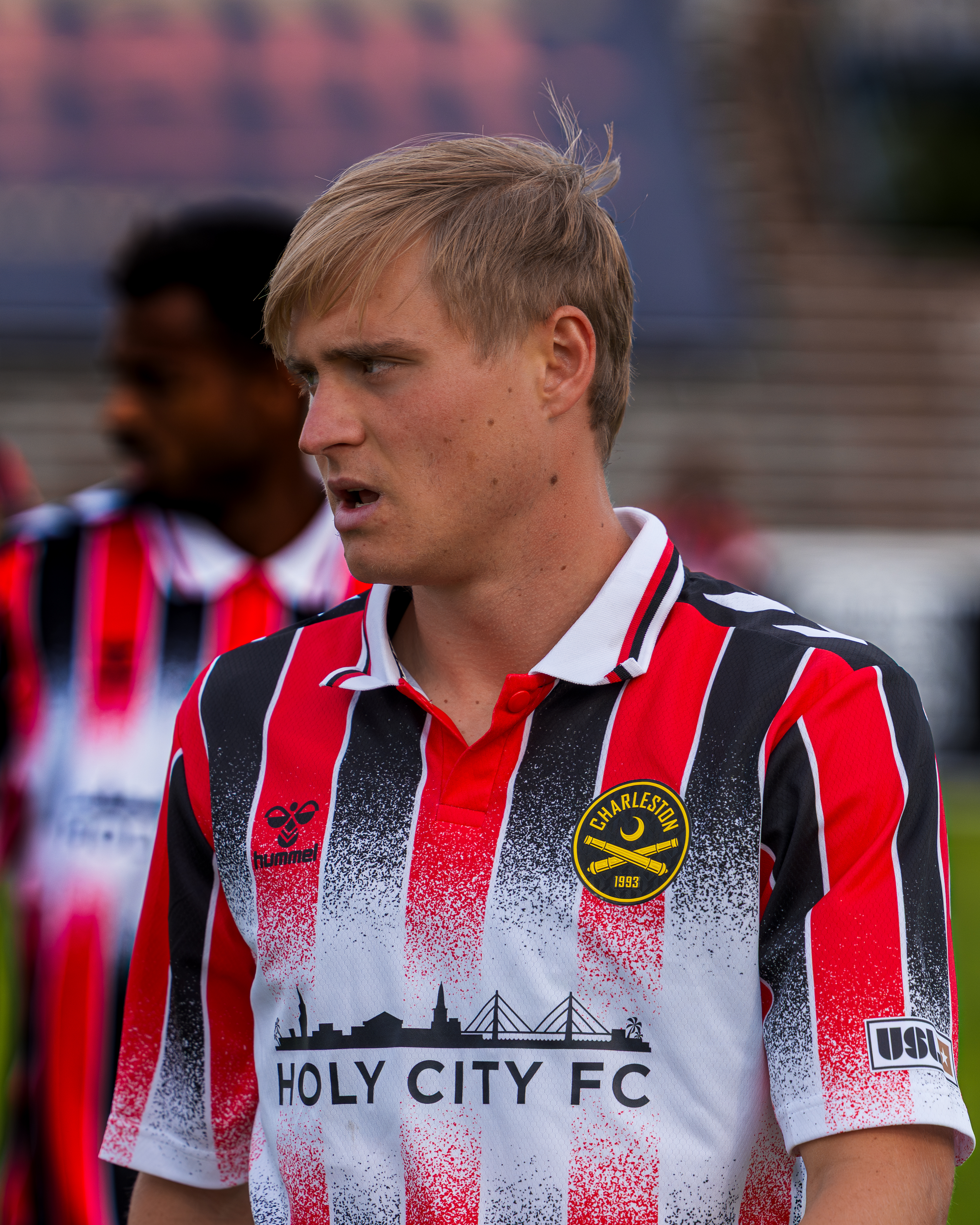
Nathan Messer was one of three players to make 39 appearances for the Hearts' inaugural season; Ollie Wright and Sean Vinberg were the others. Messer was one of two players named to the USL League One first team of the season in the Hearts' inaugural season, along with Masashi Wada.

The club played its first competitive match, a 4–0 victory over CD Faialense of the Bay State Soccer League in the U.S. Open Cup, on March 20, 2025. The club's first goal was scored in the 18th minute by Walter Varela. The match was played at Lewiston High School's Don Roux Field due to ongoing renovations at Fitzpatrick Stadium. A second U.S. Open Cup match was played at Lewiston High School against USL Championship team Hartford Athletic on April 2. After ending regulation time scoreless, the Hearts were reduced to ten men after an Azaad Liadi red card in the 96th minute, and went down 1–0 to a 107th minute Hartford goal through Jordan Scarlett. In the 117th minute, Jake Keegan equalized for the Hearts, sending the match to a penalty shoot-out. The Hearts converted all four penalties while Hartford missed two, sending the Hearts through to the third round of the Open Cup in an upset. They were eliminated in the following round after a 2–1 defeat to Rhode Island FC, again held at Lewiston High School.

The team's first league match was a 0–0 draw on the road against fellow expansion team FC Naples on March 29, 2025. Over 200 Hearts of Pine fans travelled to Naples for the match. After another 0–0 draw at Spokane Velocity, the club's first goal in league play was scored by captain Patrick Langlois in the club's third league match, a 2–1 defeat to Tormenta FC in Statesboro, Georgia.

On April 30, the Hearts of Pine announced that they had sold out their inaugural match at Fitzpatrick Stadium. The match, played on May 4 and attended by Governor Janet Mills, was a 1–1 draw for the Hearts of Pine against One Knoxville SC. Knoxville's Stuart Ritchie scored the first goal at Fitzpatrick Stadium in the second minute, while Masashi Wada scored the first Hearts of Pine goal at Fitzpatrick in first half stoppage time. Two weeks later, the Hearts of Pine celebrated their first League One victory, a 2–1 win over FC Naples at Fitzpatrick Stadium. The club earned its first road victory in the early hours of July 13, defeating fellow expansion side Texoma FC 1–0 after multiple weather delays. The Hearts of Pine clinched a playoff spot in their inaugural season following a 2–2 draw against fellow expansion team Westchester SC on October 17. The club set a USL League One attendance record three days later on October 21, when 6,440 fans attended a 6–1 victory over Spokane Velocity.

The Hearts of Pine finished the 2025 season in seventh place, and defeated the second-seeded Chattanooga Red Wolves at 1–0 on the road at Chattanooga's CHI Memorial Stadium in their first ever playoff game. The Hearts would be defeated in the next round against Spokane Velocity at One Spokane Stadium, a 2–2 draw that saw Spokane advance to the finals by winning 6–5 on penalties.

Ollie Wright finished as the Hearts' top goalscorer, with 12 in all competitions, and was selected for the 2025 All-League Second Team. Wada and defender Nathan Messer were chosen for the All-League First Team.

Ad Age reported that the Hearts of Pine had sold more merchandise than every other team in USL League One combined, and that the club projected to top League One in gross revenue and ticket sales at the conclusion of the 2025 season. Following the 2025 season, the Hearts of Pine won awards from the United Soccer League for best marketing, best consumer products, and best public relations, while club founder Gabe Hoffman-Johnson won an award for leadership, and club president Kevin Schohl won an award for business.

=== 2026 season ===
The Hearts suffered an injury-plagued season with both Wada and Wright missing significant time, and finished in 14th of 17 with an 8–14–10 record, and were eliminated by USL League Two side Vermont Green FC in the first round of the U.S. Open Cup. Rookie Aboubacar Camara finished the season as top scorer, with 11 goals across all competitions.

== Club crest and colors ==
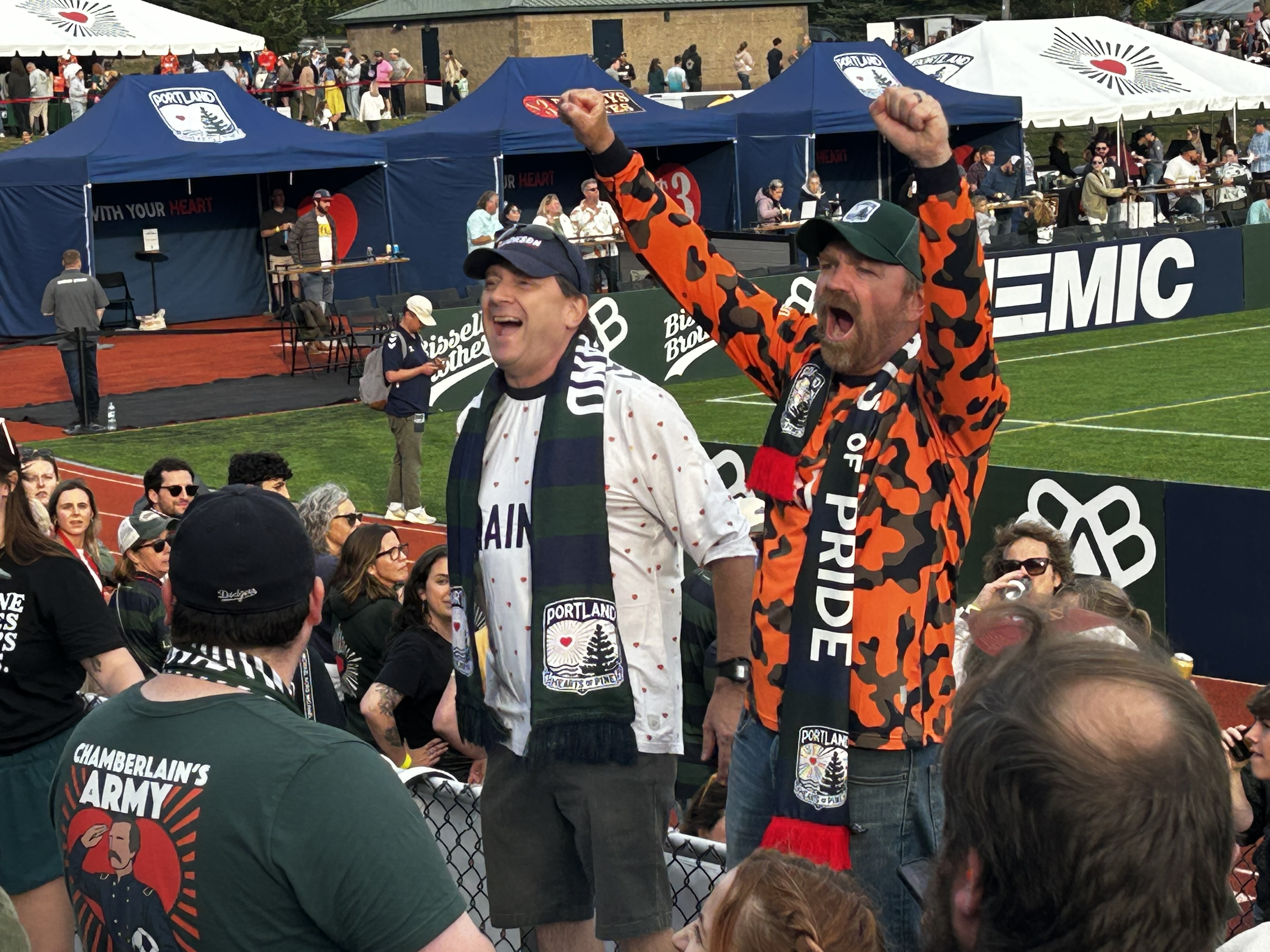
Troy Jackson (left) in a Hearts of Pine "Bandit" jersey and Graham Platner in a Hearts of Pine "Blaze" jersey at a Hearts of Pine match in 2025.

Michel Poon-Angeron in a Hearts of Pine "Woods & Water" jersey during a 2026 match against Richmond Kickers.

The club's Hearts of Pine nickname and crest were unveiled on April 27, 2024. The crest features a pine tree, waves, and a heart inside of the starburst featured on the Seal of Maine. The font for "Portland" was inspired by the Portland Company building on Portland's waterfront, and the scroll bearing "Hearts of Pine" is a nod to Maine's literary tradition. In June of 2025, the Hearts of Pine hosted an event with Dark Harbor Tattoo in Portland, with the team paying half of the cost for fans to get a team-related tattoo.

The inaugural primary jersey was unveiled on November 21, 2024, during a sold-out event at the State Theatre in Portland attended by Maine Governor Janet Mills. The primary jersey, dubbed the "Woods and Water Kit", features forest green and navy blue hoops with red accents on the collar and sleeve cuffs.

The club's inaugural secondary jersey, nicknamed the "Bandit Kit", was released on February 11, 2025. The kit is white with red hearts in a polka dot pattern, and has navy blue sleeve and collar cuffs.

On September 24, 2025, the club revealed its first-ever third kit, dubbed the "Blaze Kit". It features a blaze orange base with a darker camouflage pattern shaped like hearts as a nod to Maine's hunting tradition.

The club released two goalkeeper kits for its inaugural season: a red primary keeper with a brick motif inspired by the brick buildings in Portland's Old Port neighborhood, nicknamed the "Brick Wall Kit", and a blue secondary keeper kit, designed to look like the Welcome to Maine signs at the state's borders, called the "Welcome to Maine Kit". The club is retaining these kits for the 2026 USL League One season.

On New Year's Day 2026, the club unveiled a new kit inspired by the West Quoddy Head Light in Lubec, Maine, named the Lighthouse Kit. The kit features red and white hoops, akin to the stripes on the lighthouse. Retired United States men’s national soccer team forward Landon Donovan appeared in the kit's launch video. The Lighthouse Kit will replace the Bandit Kit as the Hearts' secondary kit for the 2026 season.

The club's identity and marketing tactics received praise, with an article in Ad Age describing the club as "the buzziest" in American soccer. The club's crest and kits have specifically been lauded for their authenticity to Maine culture, as well as their designs.

=== Kit history ===
Home and away kits.

- Home

2025–

- Away

2025	2026

- Third

2026–

=== Sponsorship ===
Seasons	Shirt manufacturer	Shirt sponsor	Sleeve sponsor
2025	(Denmark) Hummel	Maine Office of Tourism	L.L.Bean (primary, third); The Dempsey Center (secondary); Brickyard Hollow Brewing Company (primary keeper); Trellis Health (secondary keeper)
2026–present	(Denmark) Hummel	Maine Office of Tourism	L.L.Bean (outfield); Brickyard Hollow Brewing Company (primary keeper); Trellis Health (secondary keeper)

== Supporters ==
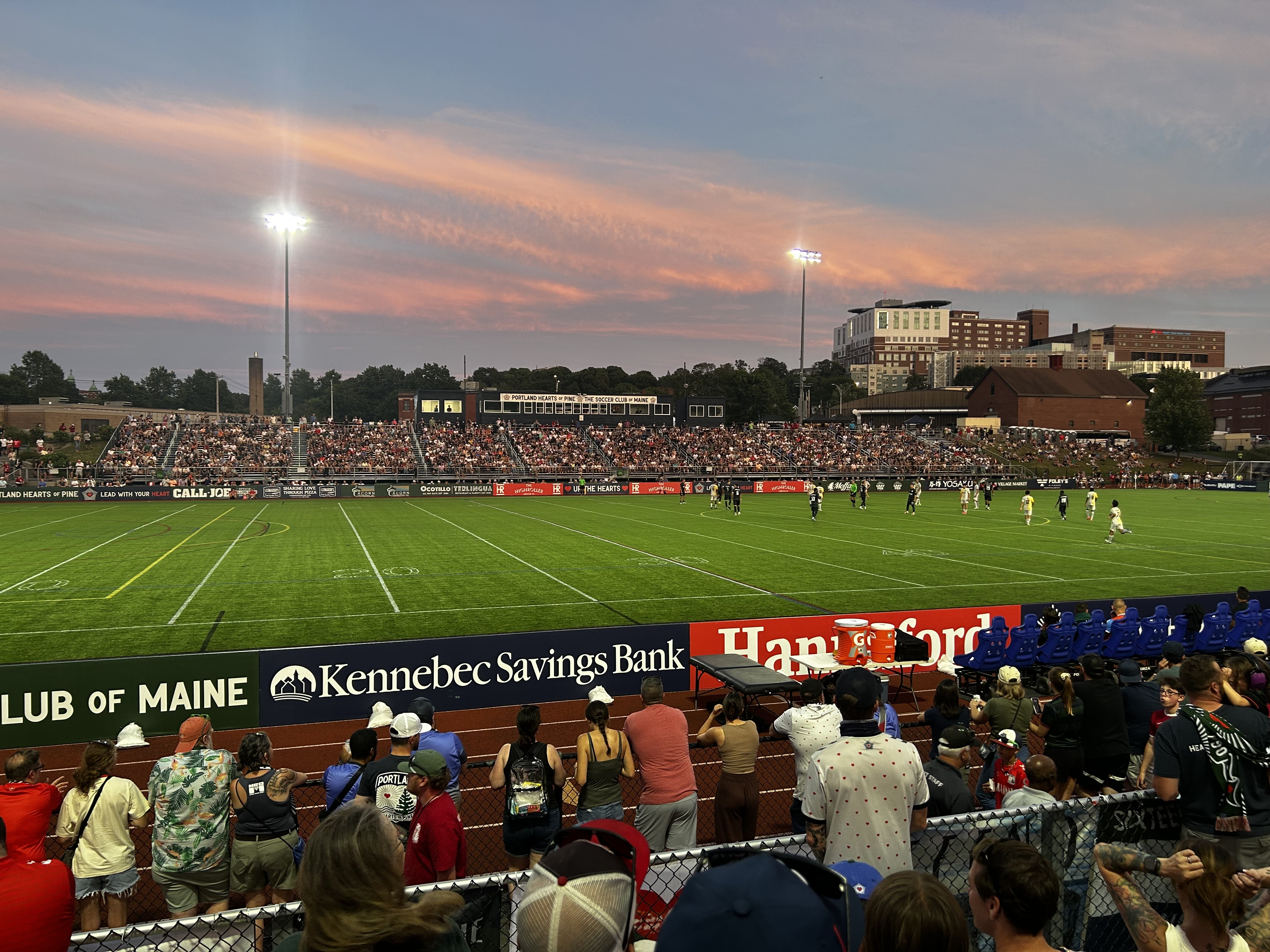
Fitzpatrick Stadium on July 25, 2025, during a Hearts of Pine match

The official supporters group is Dirigo Union, an organization founded before the club. Dīrigō (Latin "I direct" or "I lead") is the state motto of Maine.

== Stadium ==
The Hearts of Pine play at Fitzpatrick Stadium in Portland, negotiating a five-year lease in 2023. The stadium has 6,300 seats. The team funded the installation of a new artificial turf field, which eliminated the Portland High School Bulldogs logo and the sewn-in lines. The team agreed to pay to have the lines painted and removed as needed by the school sports schedule.

Due to renovations at Fitzpatrick, the team played its first three U.S. Open Cup matches in March and April 2025 in the city of Lewiston, 33 miles (53 km) north of Portland, at Lewiston High School's Don Roux Field.

=== Cassidy Point stadium project ===
On August 4, 2026, the club announced that they had purchased land on Cassidy Point in Portland's West End neighborhood with the intention of building a stadium for both the Hearts and Wildness. The club estimated that it would cost $50 million to build, and projected that the stadium would be ready for the 2029 season.

== Ownership ==
Logo for the ownership group of the Hearts and Wildness

Founder Gabe Hoffman-Johnson, real estate developers Jonathan and Catherine Culley, and NESN sportscaster Tom Caron form the majority ownership group, operating under an entity known as The Soccer Club of Maine. Dexter Paine, the owner of the ECHL's Maine Mariners and chairman of the private equity firm Paine Schwartz Partners, purchased a minority stake in the team in September 2025.

=== Maine Wildness ===
In October 2025, club ownership expressed interest in creating a women's team to compete in the USL W League, entering the league in the 2027 season at the earliest. On February 4, 2026, the club announced "USLW To Portland" and a series of town halls to engage the community around a potential USL W League team. On June 4, 2026, the club and USL announced that the W League would be expanding to Maine for the 2027 season. The team name, Maine Wildness, and logo were revealed on October 15, 2026. The club's logo and colors were chosen to be similar to, but distinct from, those of the Hearts of Pine.

Club ownership noted that the Hearts of Pine did not own Wildness, and that the clubs were coequal and shared an ownership under the Soccer Club of Maine.

== Current roster ==
As of August 17, 2026

Note: Flags indicate national team as defined under FIFA eligibility rules; some limited exceptions apply. Players may hold more than one non-FIFA nationality.

No.	Pos.	Nation	Player
0	GK	USA	Peter Morrell
1	GK	USA	Hunter Morse
2	DF	USA	Jaden Jones-Riley
4	MF	USA	Diego Letayf Escutia
5	MF	USA	Mikey Lopez (captain)
6	DF	SOM	Mo Mohamed
7	MF	CPV	Walter Varela
8	MF	TTO	Michel Poon-Angeron (vice-captain)
9	FW	GUI	Aboubacar Camara
10	MF	ENG	Ollie Wright (third captain)
11	MF	SLE	Jay Tee Kamara
14	FW	USA	Titus Washington
16	MF	USA	Diego Gonzalez (on loan from Houston Dynamo 2)
18	MF	POR	Diogo Barbosa
19	MF	USA	Khalid Hersi

No.	Pos.	Nation	Player
21	MF	CYP	Konstantinos Georgallides
22	DF	USA	Brecc Evans
23	GK	USA	Kashope Oladapo
24	FW	ARG	Felipe Rodríguez-Gentile
25	DF	USA	Esteban Espinosa
26	DF	JPN	Eiji Hata
35	MF	USA	Tyler Huck
41	DF	JAM	Zion Scarlett
44	DF	SEN	Serigne Mbacké Faye
66	DF	JAM	Kemali Green
70	FW	USA	Lagos Kunga
77	MF	JPN	Masashi Wada
98	MF	USA	Matteo Kidd
99	DF	USA	Josh Drack

== Staff ==
On November 14, 2024, the club named St. Louis City 2 coach Bobby Murphy as the team's inaugural head coach and sporting director on November 14, 2024. On August 31 2026, the Hearts named Ray Saari as sporting director.

Position	Name
Founder	(United States) Gabe Hoffman-Johnson
President	(United States) Kevin Schohl
Director of Soccer Operations	(United States) James Hilepo
Sporting Director	(United States) Ray Saari
Head Coach	(United States) Bobby Murphy
Assistant Coach	(England) Alex Ryan
Goalkeeping Coach	(Japan) Yuta Nomura

== Team records ==
As of October 7, 2025

=== Year-by-year ===
Season	League	Regular Season								Playoffs	U.S. Open Cup	USL Cup	Top scorer		Average attendance
Season	League	Pld	W	D	L	GF	GA	Pts	Pos	Playoffs	U.S. Open Cup	USL Cup	Player	Goals	Average attendance
2025	USL1	30	11	12	7	48	38	45	7th	Semifinals	Third Round	Group Stage	(England) Ollie Wright	12	5,829 ♦ Setting the inaugural season average attendance record (USL 1)
2026	USL1	32	8	14	10	48	58	34	14th	N/A	First Round	Group Stage	(Guinea) Aboubacar Camara	11	

1. Top Scorer includes all goals scored in regular season, league playoffs, U.S. Open Cup, and other competitive continental matches.

=== USL Cup ===
Season	USL Cup								Play-offs	Top Scorer	
Season	P	W	D	L	GF	GA	Pts	Pos	Play-offs	Player	G
2025	4	2	0	2	7	6	5	4th, Gr. D	N/A	(United States) Azaad Liadi	2
2026	4	2	0	2	6	9	6	4th, Gr. D	N/A	(England) Ollie Wright	2

=== Club awards ===
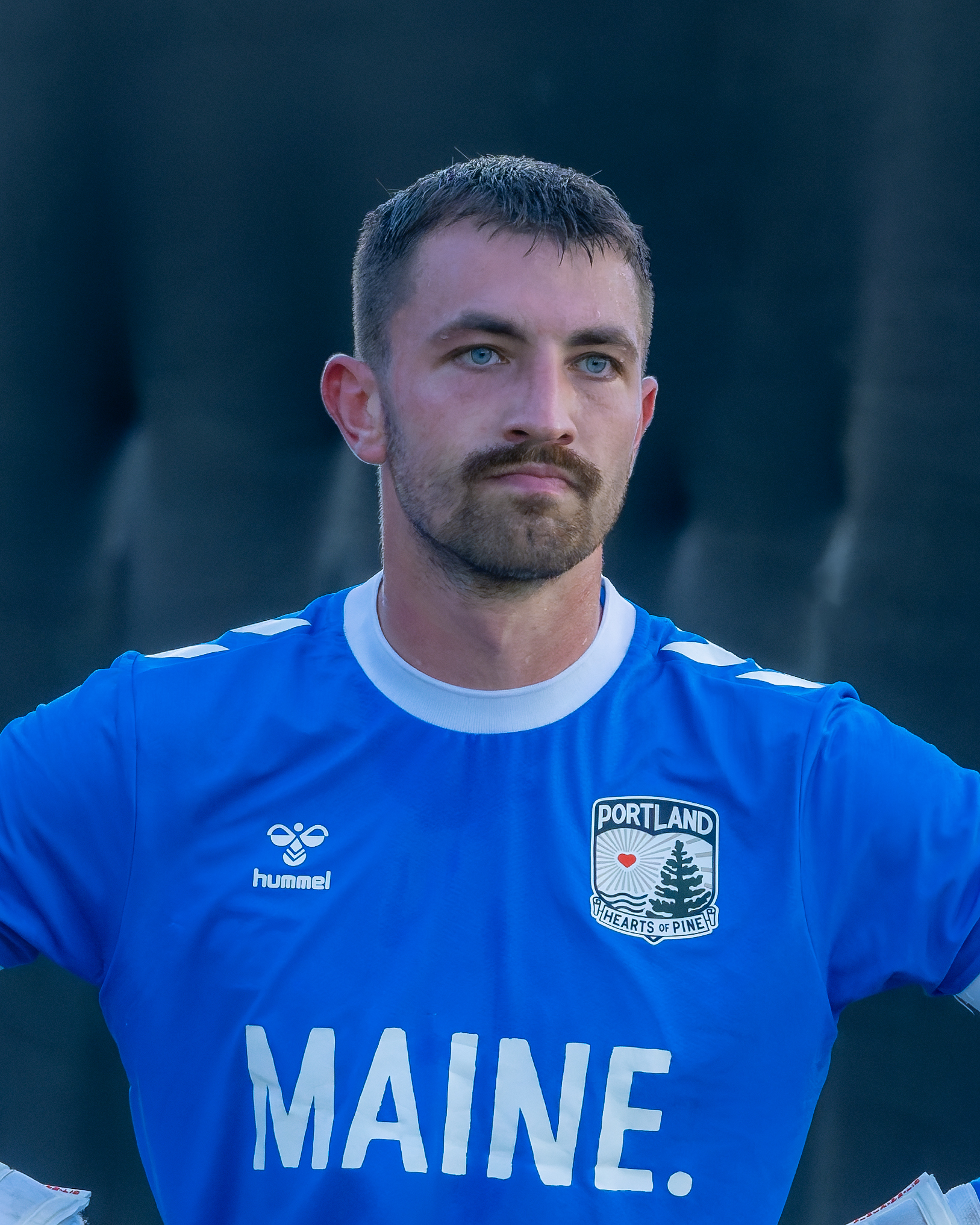
Hunter Morse was chosen as the club's most valuable player for the 2025 and 2026 seasons.

Year	Most Valuable Player	Pos.	Supporters' Player of the Year	Pos.	Rookie/Newcomer of the Year	Pos.	Lead With Your Heart Community Award	Pos.	Source
2025	(United States) Hunter Morse	GK	(England) Ollie Wright	MF	(United States) Titus Washington (Jamaica) Kemali Green	FW; DF	(United States) Mikey Lopez	MF	
2026	(United States) Hunter Morse	GK	(United States) Hunter Morse	GK	(United States) Matteo Kidd	MF	(Somalia) Mo Mohamed	DF	

=== Most appearances ===
Statistics correct as of match played October 24, 2026

Rank	Player	Nation	Appearances	Goals	Career
1	Michel Poon-Angeron	Trinidad and Tobago	68	1	2025–
2	Ollie Wright	England	65	21	2025–
2	Hunter Morse	United States	65	0	2025–
4	Kemali Green	Jamaica	62	1	2025–
5	Jay Tee Kamara	Sierra Leone	60	10	2025–
6	Mikey Lopez	United States	53	2	2025–
7	Walter Varela	Cape Verde	51	4	2025–
8	Mo Mohamed	Somalia	47	1	2025–
9	Titus Washington	United States	44	9	2025–
10	Nathan Messer	United States	39	7	2025
10	Sean Vinberg	United States	39	1	2025

=== Most goals ===
Statistics correct as of match played October 24, 2026

Rank	Player	Nation	Goals	Appearances	Career
1	Ollie Wright	England	21	65	2025–
2	Aboubacar Camara	Guinea	11	21	2026–
3	Masashi Wada	Japan	10	37	2025–
3	Jay Tee Kamara	Sierra Leone	10	53	2025–
5	Titus Washington	United States	9	44	2025–
5	Diego Gonzalez	United States	9	13	2026–
7	Nathan Messer	United States	7	39	2025
8	Azaad Liadi	United States	6	28	2025
9	Walter Varela	Cape Verde	4	51	2025–
10	Jake Keegan	United States	3	20	2025
10	Konstantinos Georgallides	Cyprus	3	25	2026–
10	Nathaniel James	Trinidad and Tobago	3	21	2025
10	Matteo Kidd	United States	3	35	2026–
