= Nathan Messer =

English footballer (born 2001)

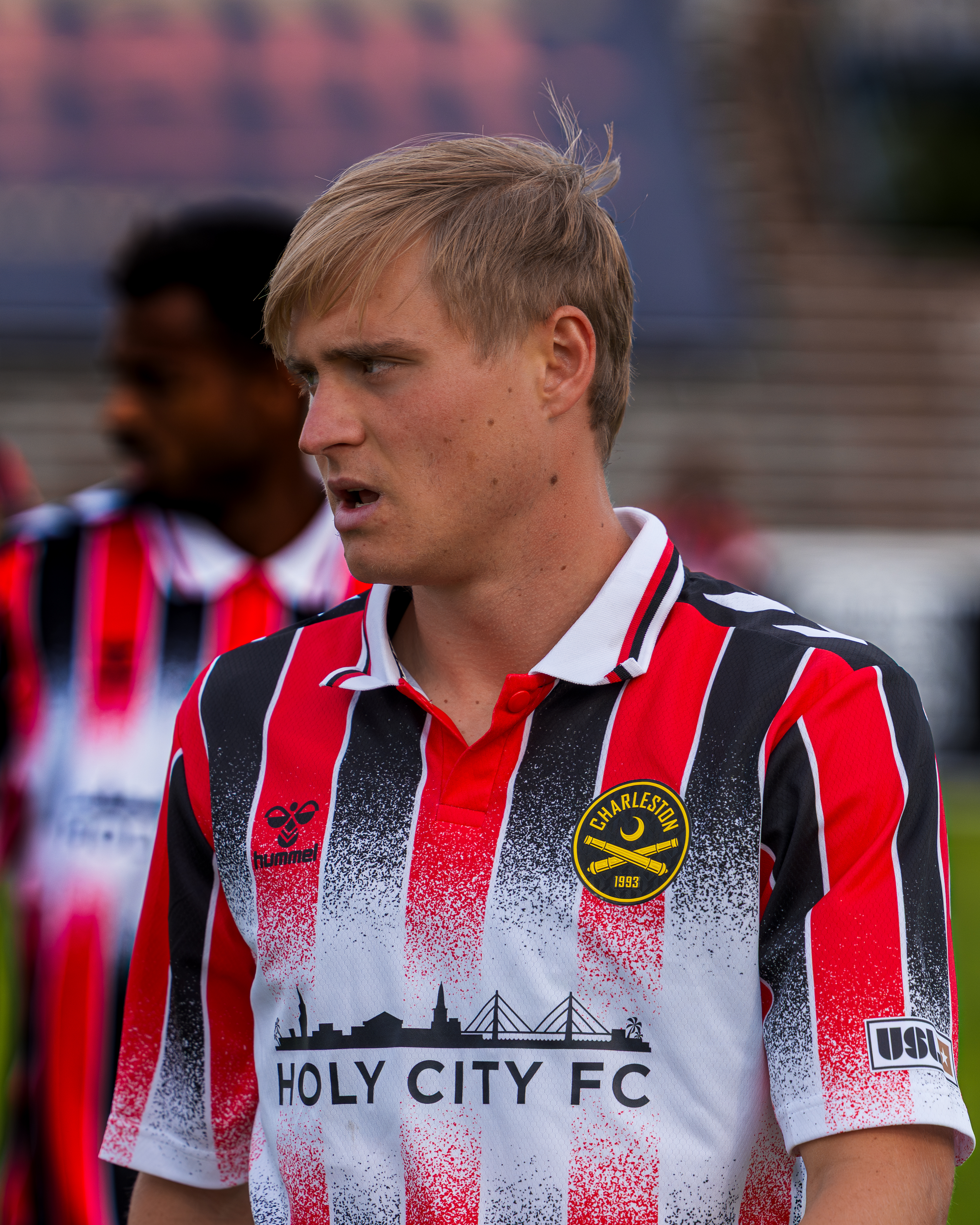
- Messer with the Charleston Battery in 2026

Personal information
- Full name: Nathan Igor Messer
- Date of birth: 6 July 2001 (age 25)
- Place of birth: London, England
- Height: 1.80 m (5 ft 11 in)
- Position: Defender

Team information
- Current team: Charleston Battery
- Number: 3

College career
Years	Team	Apps	(Gls)
2019–2022	College of William & Mary	58	(8)
2023	Providence College	17	(4)

Senior career*
Years	Team	Apps	(Gls)
2020	TSV Meerbusch	9	(0)
2021	Northern Virginia FC	10	(1)
2022	ND Primorje	1	(0)
2022–2023	Vermont Green FC	13	(0)
2024	Rhode Island FC	3	(0)
2025	Portland Hearts of Pine	32	(6)
2026–	Charleston Battery	29	(0)
- * Club domestic league appearances and goals

Nathan Igor Messer (born 6 July 2001) is an English professional footballer who currently plays as a defender for Charleston Battery in the USL Championship.

== Early life ==
Nathan Messer was born 6 July 2001 in London to a French mother and a German father. The family eventually settled in Bethesda, Maryland.

== Career ==
=== College career ===
Messer spent four years playing for the College of William & Mary Tribe, making 58 appearances, before transferring to Providence College Friars for an additional year, making 17 appearances for the Friars.

=== Pre-professional and early professional career ===
While in college, Messer played for TSV Meerbusch in Germany's Oberliga Niederrhein in 2020, and ND Primorje in Slovenia's Second League in 2022. In 2021, Messer played for Northern Virginia FC of USL League Two to begin his pre-professional career in the United States. In 2022, he moved to fellow USL League Two side Vermont Green FC, where he played from 2022 to 2023. He jointly holds the records for most career assists for the Green.

He then moved to the USL Championship team Rhode Island FC to start his professional career, where he was a part of the team that won the 2024 Eastern Conference title, but played just four times.

=== Portland Hearts of Pine (2025) ===
He signed with the USL League One team Portland Hearts of Pine in 2025. Initially a winger, he converted to left-back for the Hearts of Pine. He scored and assisted in his debut with the Hearts, a 4–0 win over CD Faialense in the U.S. Open Cup. Messer was one of three Hearts of Pine players to appear in 39 of the club's 40 matches in 2025, and was named to the USL League One team of the week on six occasions during the season. Following the conclusion of the 2025 USL League One season, Messer was voted first team All-League.

=== Charleston Battery (2026–present) ===
Messer moved to Charleston Battery of the USL Championship ahead of the 2026 season.

== Honours ==
=== Vermont Green FC ===
- Joint-most assists in club history (8)
- Joint-most assists in a season (7)

=== Portland Hearts of Pine ===
- USL League One All-League First Team
