= Michel Poon-Angeron =

Trinidadian footballer (born 2001)

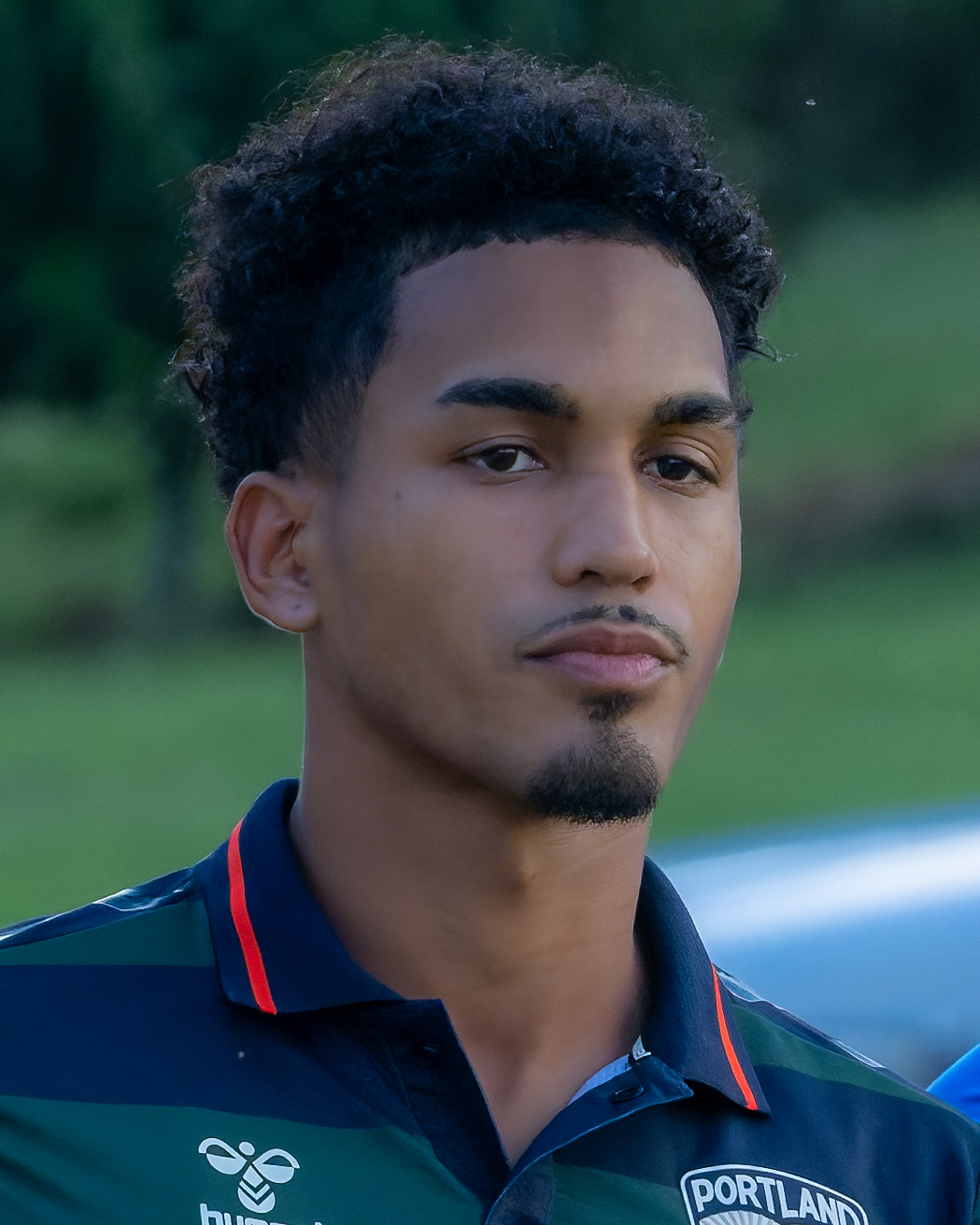
- Poon-Angeron with Portland in 2026

Personal information
- Date of birth: 19 April 2001 (age 25)
- Place of birth: Trinidad & Tobago
- Height: 1.71 m (5 ft 7 in)
- Position: Midfielder

Team information
- Current team: Portland Hearts of Pine
- Number: 8

Youth career
- –2018: Saint Mary's College
- 2019–2020: Banfield

Senior career*
| Years | Team | Apps | (Gls) |
| 2021–2023 | Banfield II | | |
| 2024 | AC Port of Spain | | |
| 2024 | Fuerte San Francisco | | |
| 2024 | AC Port of Spain | | |
| 2025– | Portland Hearts of Pine | 57 | (1) |

International career^{‡}
| 2021– | Trinidad and Tobago | 17 | (1) |
- * Club domestic league appearances and goals as of 25 October 2026 ‡ National team caps and goals as of 17 December 2024

Michel Poon-Angeron (born 19 April 2001) is a Trinidadian football player who currently plays for USL League One club Portland Hearts of Pine.

Poon-Angeron was a member of the AC Port of Spain team that won the 2023–24 TT Premier Football League.

On 17 December 2024, Poon-Angeron was announced as the first-ever signing by USL League One expansion side Portland Hearts of Pine. In February 2025, Poon-Angeron was called up by the Trinidad and Tobago national team, making him the first international call-up ever for Hearts of Pine.

== Career statistics ==
=== International ===
As of matches played 1 February 2021.

| National team | Year | Apps | Goals |
|---|---|---|---|
| Trinidad and Tobago | 2021 | 4 | 0 |
| Total | | 4 | 0 |
