= Bobby Murphy (soccer) =

American soccer coach

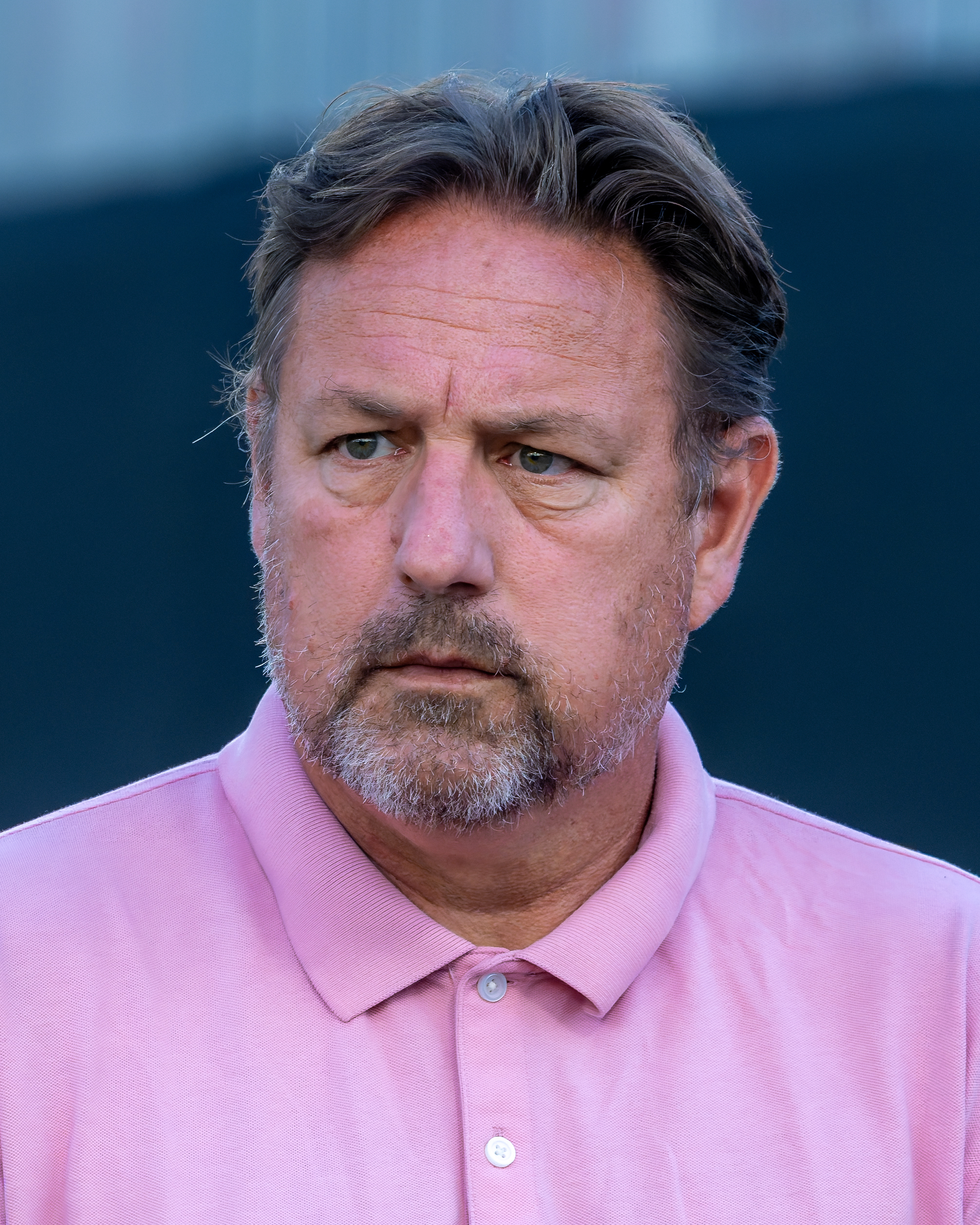
- Murphy coaching Portland in 2026

Personal information
- Place of birth: United States

Team information
- Current team: Portland Hearts of Pine (head coach)

College career
Years	Team	Apps	(Gls)
- Clemson Tigers
- New Hampshire College Penmen

Managerial career
- 1993–1998: Plymouth State Panthers (assistant)
- 1999: Southern Maine Huskies
- 2003–2016: St. Stephen's Episcopal (academy director)
- 2016–2018: Orlando City (assistant)
- 2016: Orlando City (interim)
- 2018: Orlando City (interim)
- 2020: Rio Grande Valley FC (assistant)
- 2021–2022: Union Omaha (assistant)
- 2023–2024: St. Louis City 2
- 2025–: Portland Hearts of Pine

Bobby Murphy is an American soccer coach who is currently the head coach for USL League One side Portland Hearts of Pine.

== Playing career ==
Murphy, a native of Dallas, first played for the Clemson Tigers men's soccer team, before transferring to New Hampshire College.

== Coaching career ==
=== Early career ===
Murphy began coaching at Plymouth State College while earning his master's degree in education. His first head coaching opportunity was at the University of Southern Maine.

Murphy was the director of the soccer academy at St. Stephen's Episcopal School from 2003 to 2016. Before this, he was the director of coaching for the South Texas Youth Soccer Association.

=== Orlando City ===
On January 15, 2016, Murphy joined Orlando City SC of Major League Soccer as an assistant coach. Almost seven months later, on July 7, Murphy was named the interim head coach of Orlando City after Adrian Heath was relieved of his duties. His first match as interim head coach occurred on July 8 against the Houston Dynamo. The match ended 0–0. Following the hiring of Jason Kreis, Murphy resumed his role as assistant coach and technical coordinator of the club's U.S. Soccer development academy. After Kreis was relieved of his duties in 2018, Murphy once again served as interim head coach until James O'Connor was hired, who did not retain Murphy.

=== Union Omaha ===
In March 2021, Murphy joined USL League One side Union Omaha as an assistant coach.

=== St. Louis City 2 ===
On January 23, 2023, Murphy was named head coach for St. Louis City 2 in MLS Next Pro.

In the 2024 MLS Next Pro season, Murphy led St Louis City 2 to the Western Conference Final, ultimately losing in extra time.

=== Portland Hearts of Pine ===
Murphy was named the inaugural head coach of Portland Hearts of Pine, an expansion team in USL League One, on November 14, 2024. In the 2025 season, he led the Hearts of Pine to seventh in the table. The Hearts upset second-seeded Chattanooga Red Wolves SC in the first round of the playoffs, and lost the semi-finals to Spokane Velocity on penalties.

== Personal life ==
Murphy occasionally wears a sweatshirt reading "Neat" while coaching to signify an opposition to the activities of United States Immigration and Customs Enforcement, which has targeted Maine's soccer community. Hearts of Pine fans, including Democratic senate candidate Graham Platner and gubernatorial candidate Nirav D. Shah, have also adopted the sweatshirt.

== Coaching statistics ==
As of December 29, 2025

Team	From	To	Record				
Team	From	To	G	W	D	L	Win %
Orlando City	July 7, 2016	August 7, 2016	6	1	3	2	16.67
Orlando City	June 16, 2018	July 1, 2018	3	1	0	2	33.33
St. Louis City 2	January 23, 2023	November 14, 2024	56	28	13	15	50.00
Portland Hearts of Pine	November 14, 2024	Present	39	14	15	10	35.90
Total			79	34	22	23	43.04
