= CD Faialense =

Soccur club in Cambridge, Massachusetts

- Full name: Clube Desportivo Faialense
- Founded: 1972
- League: Bay State Soccer League

Clube Desportivo Faialense, commonly known as CD Faialense, is an amateur soccer club based in Cambridge, Massachusetts founded in 1972. Named after the island of Faial in the Azores, it was originally founded by immigrants from the Azores and has historically maintained strong ties to the local Portuguese community. Many Azorean immigrants settled in the Cambridge area, particularly East Cambridge, following a volcanic eruption on Faial in 1957, and joined Portuguese immigrants already settled in the area. CD Faialense purchased its current clubhouse on Cambridge Street in 1984, which serves as both a social and operational base. Faialense players balance full-time employment with their participation, organising training, matches, and club activities collectively.

The team competes in the Bay State Soccer League (BSSL) and won consecutive Division I titles in 2023 and 2024. CD Faialense fields a roster primarily composed of former Division I college players from schools such as Merrimack College, University of New Hampshire, Boston University, Harvard, and others. Players are recruited through personal connections, prioritising team cohesion and continuity over formal tryouts.

In both 2025 and 2026, CD Faialense qualified for the U.S. Open Cup. In March 2025, they faced Portland Hearts of Pine, a Division III professional side, in the first round. In November 2025 the team qualified for the 2026 U.S. Open Cup after a 5–2 victory over FC Lonestar in the qualifying round, securing a spot in the first round proper for the second consecutive year. On January 27, 2026, they were drawn against Rhode Island FC of the Division II USL Championship. They will play in Pawtucket, Rhode Island on March 17, 2026.
