= 2026 Portland Hearts of Pine season =

Portland Hearts of Pine
2026 season
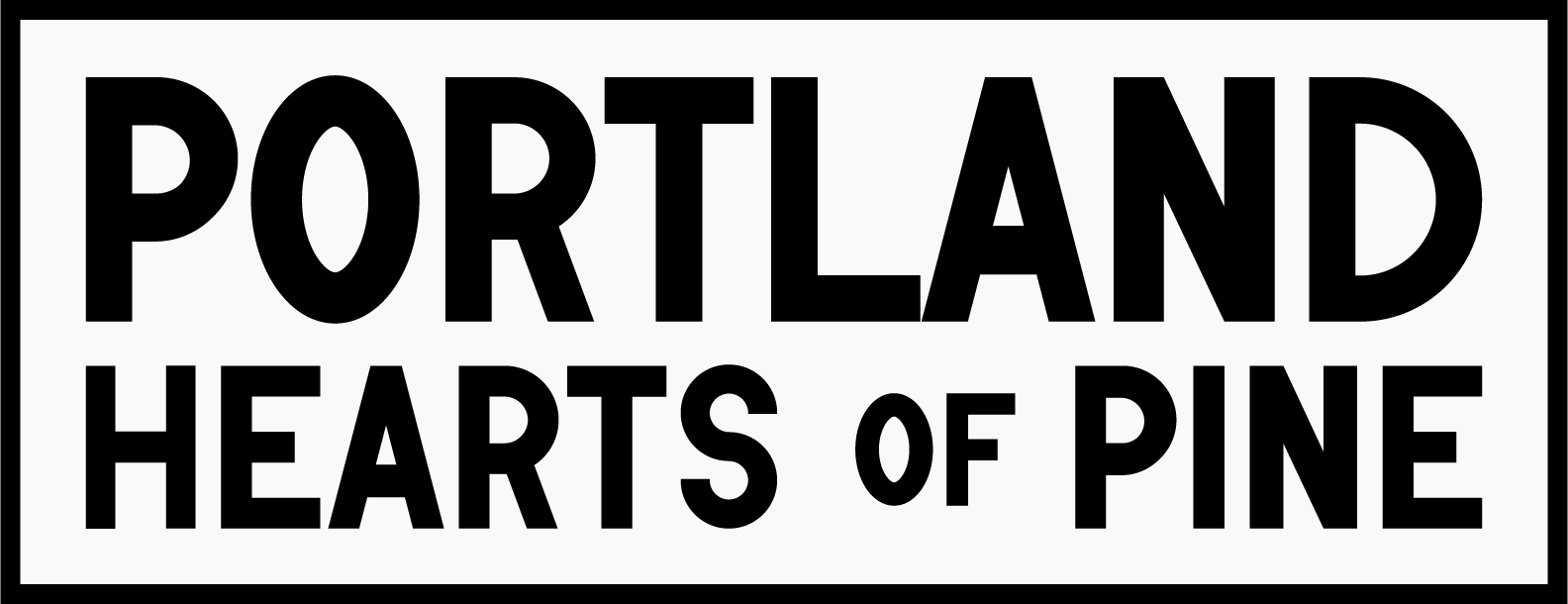
- Owner: Gabe Hoffman-Johnson; Jonathan and Catherine Culley; Tom Caron
- President: Kevin Schohl
- Head coach: Bobby Murphy
- Stadium: Fitzpatrick Stadium
- USL League One: 14th
- U.S. Open Cup: First round
- USL Cup: Group Stage, 4th Group 5
- USL Playoffs: Did not qualify
- Top goalscorer: League: (Guinea) Aboubacar Camara (10 Goals); All: (Guinea) Aboubacar Camara (11 goals)
- Highest home attendance: 6,400 vs Charlotte Independence October 24
- Lowest home attendance: 6,033 vs FC Naples April 18
- Average home league attendance: 6,245, with USL Cup 6,248
- Biggest win: Portland 5–1 Richmond Kickers, June 24
- Biggest defeat: Westchester SC 5–1 Portland, June 19
| Woods & Water colors | Lighthouse colors | Blaze colors |
- All statistics correct as of March 16, 2026.

The 2026 Portland Hearts of Pine season was the second season for the club. The club is competing in USL League One, the third-tier of American soccer, and also participated in the Lamar Hunt US Open Cup and the USL Cup.

== Players and staff ==
=== Roster ===
Players and squad numbers last updated on 17 August 2026.
Note: Flags indicate national team as defined under FIFA eligibility rules; some limited exceptions apply. Players may hold more than one non-FIFA nationality.

| No. | Pos. | Nation | Player |
|---|---|---|---|
| 0 | GK | USA | Peter Morrell |
| 1 | GK | USA | Hunter Morse |
| 2 | DF | USA | Jaden Jones-Riley |
| 4 | MF | USA | Diego Letayf Escutia |
| 5 | MF | USA | Mikey Lopez (captain) |
| 6 | DF | SOM | Mo Mohamed |
| 7 | FW | CPV | Walter Varela |
| 8 | MF | TTO | Michel Poon-Angeron (vice-captain) |
| 9 | FW | GUI | Aboubacar Camara |
| 10 | MF | ENG | Ollie Wright (third captain) |
| 11 | MF | SLE | Jay Tee Kamara |
| 14 | FW | USA | Titus Washington |
| 16 | MF | USA | Diego Gonzalez (on loan from Houston Dynamo 2) |
| 18 | MF | POR | Diogo Barbosa |
| 19 | MF | USA | Khalid Hersi |

| No. | Pos. | Nation | Player |
|---|---|---|---|
| 21 | MF | CYP | Konstantinos Georgallides |
| 22 | DF | USA | Brecc Evans |
| 23 | GK | USA | Kashope Oladapo |
| 24 | FW | ARG | Felipe Rodríguez-Gentile |
| 25 | DF | USA | Esteban Espinosa |
| 26 | DF | JPN | Eiji Hata |
| 35 | MF | USA | Tyler Huck |
| 41 | DF | JAM | Zion Scarlett |
| 44 | DF | SEN | Serigne Mbacké Faye |
| 66 | DF | JAM | Kemali Green |
| 70 | FW | USA | Lagos Kunga |
| 77 | MF | JPN | Masashi Wada |
| 98 | MF | USA | Matteo Kidd |
| 99 | DF | USA | Josh Drack |

=== Staff ===
Front Office Staff
| Founder and Chief Community Officer | (United States) Gabe Hoffman-Johnson |
| President and Chief Business Officer | (United States) Kevin Schohl |
Technical Staff
| Sporting director | (United States) Ray Saari |
| Head Coach | (United States) Bobby Murphy |
| Assistant Coach | (England) Alex Ryan |
| Goalie Coach | (Japan) Yuta Nomura |
| Director of Soccer Operations | (United States) James Hilepo |
| Equipment Manager | (Israel) Yoray Shoshani |
| Team Trainer | (United States) Ryan McNamara |

== Transfers ==
=== In ===
| Date | Position | Number | Name | From | Type | Fee | Ref. |
|---|---|---|---|---|---|---|---|
| December 3, 2025 | DF | 22 | (United States) Brecc Evans | (United States) FC Naples | Free agent | N/A | |
| December 9, 2025 | DF | 17 | (Jamaica) Zion Scarlett | (United States) Carolina Core FC | Free agent | N/A | |
| January 5, 2026 | FW | 32 | (Argentina) Emiliano Terzaghi | (United States) Richmond Kickers | Free agent | N/A | |
| January 8, 2026 | DF | 44 | (Senegal) Serigne Mbacké Faye | (Bulgaria) Etar | Free agent | N/A | |
| January 16, 2026 | DF | 25 | (United States) Esteban Espinosa | (Belgium) RWDM Molenbeek | Free agent | N/A | |
| January 29, 2026 | FW | 70 | (United States) Lagos Kunga | (United States) Union Omaha | Free agent | N/A | |
| February 3, 2026 | MF | 21 | (Cyprus) Konstantinos Georgallides | (United States) UCLA Bruins | Free agent | N/A | |
| February 20, 2026 | DF | 3 | (United States) Adam Armour | (Germany) Eintracht Nordhorn | Free agent | N/A | |
| February 24, 2026 | DF | 27 | (United States) Ernest Mensah Jr. | (United States) Syracuse Orange | Free agent | N/A | |
| March 5, 2026 | MF | 18 | (Portugal) Diogo Barbosa | (Malta) Gżira United F.C. | Free agent | N/A | |
| March 7, 2026 | MF | 98 | (United States) Matteo Kidd | (United States) St. Louis City 2 | Free agent | N/A | |
| March 10, 2026 | FW | 9 | (Guinea) Aboubacar Camara | (United States) Penn State Nittany Lions | Free agent | N/A | |
| March 10, 2026 | MF | 35 | (United States) Tyler Huck | (United States) Bowdoin Polar Bears | Free agent | N/A | |
| April 16, 2026 | DF | 99 | (United States) Josh Drack | (United States) Westchester SC | Transfer | Undisclosed | |
| April 23, 2026 | GK | 0 | (United States) Peter Morrell | (United States) Williams Ephs | Free agent | N/A | |
| June 8, 2026 | MF | 16 | (United States) Diego Gonzalez | (United States) Houston Dynamo 2 | Loan | N/A | |
| July 1, 2026 | FW | 20 | (United States) Dylan Sing | (United States) Indy Eleven | Loan | N/A | |
| August 13, 2026 | DF | 26 | (Japan) Eiji Hata | (United States) Houston Dynamo 2 | Transfer | Undisclosed | |
| August 14, 2026 | FW | 24 | (Argentina) Felipe Rodríguez-Gentile | (England) Preston North End | Free agent | N/A | |
| August 17, 2026 | MF | 4 | (United States) Diego Letayf Escutia | (United States) Vermont Green FC | Free agent | N/A | |

=== Out ===
| Date | Position | Number | Name | To | Type | Fee | Ref. |
|---|---|---|---|---|---|---|---|
| December 1, 2025 | DF | 7 | (United States) Sean Vinberg | (United States) Richmond Kickers | Contract expiration | N/A | |
| December 1, 2025 | DF | 19 | (Costa Rica) Shandon Wright | (Costa Rica) Guadalupe F.C. | Contract expiration | N/A | |
| December 1, 2025 | DF | 21 | (Puerto Rico) Colby Quiñones | Unattached | Contract expiration | N/A | |
| December 1, 2025 | DF | 45 | (France) Séga Coulibaly | (United States) Charlotte Independence | Contract expiration | N/A | |
| December 1, 2025 | MF | 6 | (United States) Pat Langlois | (United States) Corpus Christi FC | Contract expiration | N/A | |
| December 1, 2025 | MF | 17 | (United States) Mickey Reilly | Unattached | Contract expiration | N/A | |
| December 1, 2025 | MF | 47 | (Trinidad and Tobago) Nathaniel James | (United States) North Texas SC | Contract expiration | N/A | |
| December 1, 2025 | FW | 9 | (United States) Azaad Liadi | (United States) Lexington SC (Note: Liadi's contract with Lexington was not renewed following the expiry of his loan to Portland. As a free agent, Liadi joined Greenville Triumph on February 4, 2026.) | Loan expiration | N/A | |
| December 1, 2025 | FW | 11 | (United States) Evan Southern | (United States) Asheville City SC | Contract expiration | N/A | |
| December 1, 2025 | FW | 12 | (United States) Jake Keegan | (United States) Corpus Christi FC | Contract expiration | N/A | |
| December 1, 2025 | FW | 99 | (Norway) Noah Kvifte | Unattached | Contract expiration | N/A | |
| February 5, 2026 | DF | 3 | (England) Nathan Messer | (United States) Charleston Battery | Transfer | Undisclosed | |
| April 18, 2026 | DF | 3 | (United States) Adam Armour | Unattached | Released | N/A | |
| June 12, 2026 | FW | 32 | (Argentina) Emiliano Terzaghi | (United States) Sarasota Paradise | Transfer | Undisclosed | |
| July 1, 2026 | DF | 27 | (United States) Ernest Mensah Jr. | Unattached | Released | N/A | |
| August 5, 2026 | FW | 20 | (United States) Dylan Sing | (United States) Indy Eleven | Loan recall | N/A | |

== Statistics ==
=== Appearances and goals ===
| No. | Pos | Nat | Player | Total | | USL League One | | Lamar Hunt US Open Cup | | USL Cup | | USL League One Playoffs | |
| No. | Pos | Nat | Player | Apps | Goals | Apps | Goals | Apps | Goals | Apps | Goals | Apps | Goals |
|---|---|---|---|---|---|---|---|---|---|---|---|---|---|
| 0 | GK | (United States) USA | Peter Morrell | 0 | 0 | 0+0 | 0 | 0+0 | 0 | 0+0 | 0 | 0+0 | 0 |
| 1 | GK | (United States) USA | Hunter Morse | 32 | 0 | 29+0 | 0 | 1+0 | 0 | 2+0 | 0 | 0+0 | 0 |
| 2 | DF | (United States) USA | Jaden Jones-Riley | 16 | 0 | 8+6 | 0 | 0+0 | 0 | 2+0 | 0 | 0+0 | 0 |
| 3 | DF | (United States) USA | Adam Armour | 4 | 0 | 2+1 | 0 | 1+0 | 0 | 0+0 | 0 | 0+0 | 0 |
| 4 | DF | (United States) USA | Diego Letayf Escutia | 10 | 0 | 6+4 | 0 | 0+0 | 0 | 0+0 | 0 | 0+0 | 0 |
| 5 | MF | (United States) USA | Mikey Lopez | 19 | 2 | 9+8 | 2 | 0+0 | 0 | 0+2 | 0 | 0+0 | 0 |
| 6 | DF | (Somalia) SOM | Mo Mohamed | 28 | 0 | 21+3 | 0 | 0+1 | 0 | 3+0 | 0 | 0+0 | 0 |
| 7 | FW | (Cape Verde) CPV | Walter Varela | 18 | 0 | 6+9 | 0 | 0+0 | 0 | 3+0 | 0 | 0+0 | 0 |
| 8 | MF | (Trinidad and Tobago) TTO | Michel Poon-Angeron | 33 | 1 | 24+5 | 1 | 1+0 | 0 | 3+0 | 0 | 0+0 | 0 |
| 9 | FW | (Guinea) GUI | Aboubacar Camara | 30 | 11 | 21+6 | 10 | 1+0 | 0 | 1+1 | 1 | 0+0 | 0 |
| 10 | MF | (England) ENG | Ollie Wright | 26 | 8 | 18+4 | 6 | 1+0 | 0 | 3+0 | 2 | 0+0 | 0 |
| 11 | MF | (Sierra Leone) SLE | Jay Tee Kamara | 31 | 4 | 16+12 | 4 | 1+0 | 0 | 0+2 | 0 | 0+0 | 0 |
| 14 | FW | (United States) USA | Titus Washington | 9 | 1 | 3+3 | 1 | 1+0 | 0 | 2+0 | 0 | 0+0 | 0 |
| 16 | MF | (United States) USA | Diego Gonzalez | 22 | 10 | 19+2 | 9 | 0+0 | 0 | 0+1 | 1 | 0+0 | 0 |
| 18 | MF | (Portugal) POR | Diogo Barbosa | 31 | 2 | 13+14 | 2 | 1+0 | 0 | 2+1 | 0 | 0+0 | 0 |
| 19 | MF | (United States) USA | Khalid Hersi | 2 | 0 | 0+0 | 0 | 0+0 | 0 | 1+1 | 0 | 0+0 | 0 |
| 20 | FW | (United States) USA | Dylan Sing | 6 | 1 | 0+4 | 1 | 0+0 | 0 | 1+1 | 0 | 0+0 | 0 |
| 21 | MF | (Cyprus) CYP | Konstantinos Georgallides | 25 | 3 | 12+9 | 3 | 0+1 | 0 | 1+2 | 0 | 0+0 | 0 |
| 22 | DF | (United States) USA | Brecc Evans | 32 | 1 | 27+1 | 1 | 0+0 | 0 | 3+1 | 0 | 0+0 | 0 |
| 23 | GK | (United States) USA | Kashope Oladapo | 6 | 0 | 3+1 | 0 | 0+0 | 0 | 2+0 | 0 | 0+0 | 0 |
| 24 | FW | (Argentina) ARG | Felipe Rodríguez-Gentile | 10 | 2 | 4+6 | 2 | 0+0 | 0 | 0+0 | 0 | 0+0 | 0 |
| 25 | DF | (United States) USA | Esteban Espinosa | 8 | 1 | 2+3 | 0 | 0+0 | 0 | 2+1 | 1 | 0+0 | 0 |
| 26 | DF | (Japan) JPN | Eiji Hata | 10 | 0 | 10+0 | 0 | 0+0 | 0 | 0+0 | 0 | 0+0 | 0 |
| 27 | DF | (United States) USA | Ernest Mensah, Jr. | 4 | 0 | 2+1 | 0 | 1+0 | 0 | 0+0 | 0 | 0+0 | 0 |
| 32 | FW | (Argentina) ARG | Emiliano Terzaghi | 6 | 0 | 3+1 | 0 | 0+1 | 0 | 1+0 | 0 | 0+0 | 0 |
| 35 | FW | (United States) USA | Tyler Huck | 17 | 1 | 7+8 | 1 | 0+0 | 0 | 0+2 | 0 | 0+0 | 0 |
| 41 | DF | (Jamaica) JAM | Zion Scarlett | 8 | 0 | 1+5 | 0 | 0+1 | 0 | 0+1 | 0 | 0+0 | 0 |
| 44 | DF | (Senegal) SEN | Serigne Mbacké Faye | 24 | 2 | 15+5 | 2 | 1+0 | 0 | 2+1 | 0 | 0+0 | 0 |
| 66 | MF | (Jamaica) JAM | Kemali Green | 33 | 0 | 25+4 | 0 | 1+0 | 0 | 2+1 | 0 | 0+0 | 0 |
| 70 | FW | (United States) USA | Lagos Kunga | 9 | 0 | 1+5 | 0 | 0+0 | 0 | 2+1 | 0 | 0+0 | 0 |
| 77 | MF | (Japan) JPN | Masashi Wada | 5 | 1 | 4+0 | 1 | 1+0 | 0 | 0+0 | 0 | 0+0 | 0 |
| 98 | MF | (United States) USA | Matteo Kidd | 35 | 3 | 20+11 | 2 | 0+1 | 0 | 3+0 | 1 | 0+0 | 0 |
| 99 | DF | (United States) USA | Josh Drack | 23 | 0 | 19+1 | 0 | 0+0 | 0 | 2+1 | 0 | 0+0 | 0 |

=== Top goalscorers ===
| Rank | Position | Number | Name | USL1 Season | U.S. Open Cup | USL Cup | USL League One Playoffs | Total |
|---|---|---|---|---|---|---|---|---|
| 1 | FW | 9 | (Guinea) Aboubacar Camara | 10 | – | 1 | – | 11 |
| 2 | MF | 16 | (United States) Diego Gonzalez | 9 | – | 1 | – | 10 |
| 3 | MF | 10 | (England) Ollie Wright | 6 | – | 2 | – | 8 |
| 4 | MF | 11 | (Sierra Leone) Jay Tee Kamara | 4 | – | 0 | – | 4 |
| 5 | MF | 21 | (Cyprus) Konstantinos Georgallides | 3 | – | 0 | – | 3 |
| 5 | MF | 98 | (United States) Matteo Kidd | 2 | – | 1 | – | 3 |
| 7 | MF | 5 | (United States) Mikey Lopez | 2 | – | 0 | – | 2 |
| 7 | FW | 18 | (Portugal) Diogo Barbosa | 2 | – | 0 | – | 2 |
| 7 | FW | 24 | (Argentina) Felipe Rodríguez-Gentile | 2 | – | 0 | – | 2 |
| 7 | MF | 44 | (Senegal) Serigne Mbacké Faye | 2 | – | 0 | – | 2 |
| 11 | MF | 8 | (Trinidad and Tobago) Michel Poon-Angeron | 1 | – | 0 | – | 1 |
| 11 | FW | 14 | (United States) Titus Washington | 1 | – | 0 | – | 1 |
| 11 | FW | 20 | (United States) Dylan Sing | 1 | – | 0 | – | 1 |
| 11 | DF | 22 | (United States) Brecc Evans | 1 | – | 0 | – | 1 |
| 11 | MF | 35 | (United States) Tyler Huck | 1 | – | 0 | – | 1 |
| 11 | MF | 77 | (Japan) Masashi Wada | 1 | – | 0 | – | 1 |
| 11 | DF | 25 | (United States) Esteban Espinosa | 0 | – | 1 | – | 1 |
| Total | | | | 48 | 0 | 6 | 0 | 54 |

=== Assist scorers ===
| Rank | Position | Number | Name | USL1 Season | U.S. Open Cup | USL Cup | USL League One Playoffs | Total |
|---|---|---|---|---|---|---|---|---|
| 1 | MF | 10 | (England) Ollie Wright | 7 | – | 1 | – | 8 |
| 2 | MF | 11 | (Sierra Leone) Jay Tee Kamara | 6 | – | – | – | 6 |
| 2 | MF | 98 | (United States) Matteo Kidd | 5 | – | 1 | – | 6 |
| 4 | FW | 9 | (Guinea) Aboubacar Camara | 3 | – | – | – | 3 |
| 4 | MF | 21 | (Cyprus) Konstantinos Georgallides | 3 | – | – | – | 3 |
| 6 | MF | 16 | (United States) Diego Gonzalez | 2 | – | 0 | – | 2 |
| 6 | DF | 99 | (United States) Josh Drack | 2 | – | – | – | 2 |
| 8 | DF | 2 | (United States) Jaden Jones-Riley | 1 | – | – | – | 1 |
| 8 | MF | 8 | (Trinidad and Tobago) Michel Poon-Angeron | 1 | – | 0 | – | 1 |
| 8 | MF | 18 | (Portugal) Diogo Barbosa | 1 | – | – | – | 1 |
| 8 | FW | 35 | (United States) Tyler Huck | 1 | – | – | – | 1 |
| 8 | DF | 22 | (United States) Brecc Evans | 0 | – | 1 | – | 1 |
| Total | | | | 32 | 0 | 3 | 0 | 35 |

=== Clean sheets ===
| Rank | Number | Name | USL1 Season | U.S. Open Cup | USL Cup | USL1 Playoffs | Total |
|---|---|---|---|---|---|---|---|
| 1 | 1 | (United States) Hunter Morse | 1 | 0 | 0 | 0 | 1 |
| 1 | 23 | (United States) Kashope Oladapo | 1 | 0 | 0 | 0 | 1 |
| Total | | | 2 | 0 | 0 | 0 | 2 |

=== Disciplinary record ===
| No. | Pos. | Player | USL League One Regular Season | | | Lamar Hunt US Open Cup | | | USL Cup | | | USL League One Playoffs | | | Total | | |
| No. | Pos. | Player | Yellow card | (yellow card) (yellow-red card) | Red card | Yellow card | (yellow card) (yellow-red card) | Red card | Yellow card | (yellow card) (yellow-red card) | Red card | Yellow card | (yellow card) (yellow-red card) | Red card | Yellow card | (yellow card) (yellow-red card) | Red card |
| 0 | GK | (United States) Peter Morrell | 0 | 0 | 0 | 0 | 0 | 0 | 0 | 0 | 0 | 0 | 0 | 0 | 0 | 0 | 0 |
| 1 | GK | (United States) Hunter Morse | 2 | 0 | 0 | 0 | 0 | 0 | 0 | 0 | 0 | 0 | 0 | 0 | 2 | 0 | 0 |
| 2 | DF | (United States) Jaden Jones-Riley | 1 | 0 | 0 | 0 | 0 | 0 | 0 | 0 | 0 | 0 | 0 | 0 | 1 | 0 | 0 |
| 3 | DF | (United States) Adam Armour | 2 | 0 | 0 | 0 | 0 | 0 | 0 | 0 | 0 | 0 | 0 | 0 | 2 | 0 | 0 |
| 4 | MF | (United States) Diego Letayf Escutia | 3 | 0 | 0 | 0 | 0 | 0 | 0 | 0 | 0 | 0 | 0 | 0 | 0 | 3 | 0 |
| 5 | MF | (United States) Mikey Lopez | 4 | 1 | 0 | 0 | 0 | 0 | 1 | 0 | 0 | 0 | 0 | 0 | 5 | 1 | 0 |
| 6 | DF | (Somalia) Mo Mohamed | 3 | 0 | 0 | 0 | 0 | 0 | 0 | 0 | 0 | 0 | 0 | 0 | 3 | 0 | 0 |
| 7 | FW | (Cape Verde) Walter Varela | 3 | 0 | 0 | 0 | 0 | 0 | 0 | 0 | 0 | 0 | 0 | 0 | 3 | 0 | 0 |
| 8 | MF | (Trinidad and Tobago) Michel Poon-Angeron | 7 | 0 | 0 | 0 | 0 | 0 | 0 | 0 | 0 | 0 | 0 | 0 | 7 | 0 | 0 |
| 9 | FW | (Guinea) Aboubacar Camara | 1 | 0 | 0 | 0 | 0 | 0 | 0 | 0 | 0 | 0 | 0 | 0 | 1 | 0 | 0 |
| 10 | MF | (England) Ollie Wright | 7 | 0 | 0 | 1 | 0 | 0 | 1 | 0 | 0 | 0 | 0 | 0 | 9 | 0 | 0 |
| 11 | MF | (Sierra Leone) Jay Tee Kamara | 2 | 0 | 1 | 0 | 0 | 0 | 0 | 0 | 1 | 0 | 0 | 0 | 2 | 0 | 2 |
| 14 | FW | (United States) Titus Washington | 2 | 0 | 0 | 0 | 0 | 0 | 2 | 0 | 0 | 0 | 0 | 0 | 4 | 0 | 0 |
| 16 | MF | (United States) Diego Gonzalez | 4 | 0 | 0 | 0 | 0 | 0 | 0 | 0 | 0 | 0 | 0 | 0 | 4 | 0 | 0 |
| 18 | MF | (Portugal) Diogo Barbosa | 9 | 0 | 0 | 0 | 0 | 0 | 0 | 0 | 0 | 0 | 0 | 0 | 9 | 0 | 0 |
| 19 | MF | (United States) Khalid Hersi | 0 | 0 | 0 | 0 | 0 | 0 | 0 | 0 | 0 | 0 | 0 | 0 | 0 | 0 | 0 |
| 21 | MF | (Cyprus) Konstantinos Georgiallides | 0 | 0 | 0 | 0 | 0 | 0 | 0 | 0 | 0 | 0 | 0 | 0 | 0 | 0 | 0 |
| 22 | DF | (United States) Brecc Evans | 2 | 0 | 0 | 0 | 0 | 0 | 0 | 0 | 0 | 0 | 0 | 0 | 2 | 0 | 0 |
| 23 | GK | (United States) Kash Oladapo | 0 | 0 | 0 | 0 | 0 | 0 | 0 | 0 | 0 | 0 | 0 | 0 | 0 | 0 | 0 |
| 24 | FW | (Argentina) Felipe Rodríguez-Gentile | 2 | 0 | 0 | 0 | 0 | 0 | 0 | 0 | 0 | 0 | 0 | 0 | 2 | 0 | 0 |
| 25 | DF | (United States) Esteban Espinosa | 1 | 0 | 0 | 0 | 0 | 0 | 1 | 0 | 0 | 0 | 0 | 0 | 2 | 0 | 0 |
| 26 | DF | (Japan) Eiji Hata | 0 | 0 | 0 | 0 | 0 | 0 | 0 | 0 | 0 | 0 | 0 | 0 | 0 | 0 | 0 |
| 27 | DF | (United States) Ernest Mensah Jr. | 0 | 0 | 0 | 0 | 0 | 0 | 0 | 0 | 0 | 0 | 0 | 0 | 0 | 0 | 0 |
| 32 | FW | (Argentina) Emiliano Terzaghi | 1 | 0 | 0 | 0 | 0 | 0 | 1 | 0 | 0 | 0 | 0 | 0 | 2 | 0 | 0 |
| 35 | MF | (United States) Tyler Huck | 0 | 0 | 0 | 0 | 0 | 0 | 0 | 0 | 0 | 0 | 0 | 0 | 0 | 0 | 0 |
| 41 | DF | (Jamaica) Zion Scarlett | 1 | 0 | 0 | 0 | 0 | 0 | 0 | 0 | 0 | 0 | 0 | 0 | 1 | 0 | 0 |
| 44 | DF | (Senegal) Serigne Mbacké Faye | 4 | 1 | 0 | 0 | 0 | 0 | 0 | 0 | 0 | 0 | 0 | 0 | 4 | 1 | 0 |
| 66 | DF | (Jamaica) Kemali Green | 6 | 0 | 0 | 0 | 0 | 0 | 1 | 0 | 0 | 0 | 0 | 0 | 7 | 0 | 0 |
| 70 | FW | (United States) Lagos Kunga | 0 | 0 | 0 | 0 | 0 | 0 | 0 | 0 | 0 | 0 | 0 | 0 | 0 | 0 | 0 |
| 77 | MF | (Japan) Masashi Wada | 0 | 0 | 0 | 0 | 0 | 0 | 0 | 0 | 0 | 0 | 0 | 0 | 0 | 0 | 0 |
| 98 | MF | (United States) Matteo Kidd | 5 | 0 | 0 | 0 | 0 | 0 | 1 | 0 | 0 | 0 | 0 | 0 | 6 | 0 | 0 |
| 99 | DF | (United States) Josh Drack | 6 | 0 | 0 | 0 | 0 | 0 | 0 | 0 | 0 | 0 | 0 | 0 | 6 | 0 | 0 |
| | Head Coach | (United States) Bobby Murphy | 4 | 0 | 0 | 0 | 0 | 0 | 0 | 0 | 0 | 0 | 0 | 0 | 4 | 0 | 0 |
| Total | | | 82 | 2 | 0 | 1 | 0 | 0 | 8 | 0 | 1 | 0 | 0 | 0 | 91 | 2 | 2 |

== Friendlies ==
| February 5 | Bermuda | 2–3 | Portland Hearts of Pine | Devonshire, Bermuda |
| 7:00 PM | Lewis 22'; Joseph 39'; Dublin (yellow card) | Report | Huck 50'; Washington 62'; Kamara 75' | Stadium: Flora Duffy South Field Stadium |

| February 8 | Bermuda | Cancelled | Portland Hearts of Pine | Devonshire, Bermuda |
| 2:00 PM EDT | | | | Stadium: Flora Duffy South Field Stadium |

| February 18 | Clemson Tigers | 0–0 | Portland Hearts of Pine | Clemson, South Carolina |
| 7:00 PM EDT | | | | Stadium: Historic Riggs Stadium |

| July 26 Snowbird Derby | Portland Hearts of Pine | 1–2 | Sarasota Paradise | Portland, Maine |
| | Wright 69' | | 19'; 71' | Stadium: Fitzpatrick Stadium; Attendance: 6,335 |

| July 29 Snowbird Derby | Sarasota Paradise | 2–2 | Portland Hearts of Pine | Lakewood Ranch, Florida |
| | | | | Stadium: Premier Sports Campus |

| August 5 | Portland Hearts of Pine | 1–1 | Connecticut United FC | Portland, Maine |
| 7:00 PM ET | Hucks 70' | | 6' | Stadium: Fitzpatrick Stadium; Attendance: 6,403 |

== Competitive fixtures ==
=== Regular season ===
| March 14 1 | New York Cosmos | 1–3 | Portland Hearts of Pine | Paterson, New Jersey |
| 2:00 PM EDT | Sidoel 73' | Report | Georgallides 56'; Kidd (yellow card) 60'; Barbosa (yellow card) 64'; Green (yellow card) 65'; Wada 76'; Camara 86' | Stadium: Hinchliffe Stadium; Attendance: 4,099; Referee: Luis Arroyo |

| March 21 2 | AV Alta FC | 0–0 | Portland Hearts of Pine | Lancaster, California |
| 10:30 PM ET | Ramos (yellow card) 44'; Pajaro (yellow card) 72' | Report | Lopez (yellow card) 6' (yellow-red card) 58'; Armour (yellow card) 34'; Kamara (yellow card) 45+2' | Stadium: Lancaster Municipal Stadium; Attendance: 3,561; Referee: Robert Vincze |

| March 28 3 | Sarasota Paradise | 1–0 | Portland Hearts of Pine | Lakewood Ranch, Florida |
| 7:30 PM ET | Walker 8'; Karani (yellow card) 31'; Burlew (yellow card) 89'; Tainio (yellow card) 90' | Report | Armour (yellow card) 22'; Poon-Angeron (yellow card) 57' | Stadium: Premier Sports Campus; Attendance: 1,816; Referee: Carlos Rodriguez |

| April 11 4 | Portland Hearts of Pine | 0–0 | One Knoxville SC | Portland, Maine |
| | Wright (yellow card) 9'; Faye (yellow card) 31'; Mohamed (yellow card) 45+3'; Jones-Riley (yellow card) 48'; Scarlett (yellow card) 81'; Washington (yellow card) 89' | Report | Krioutchenkov (yellow card) 34'; Rodrigues (yellow card) 65' | Stadium: Fitzpatrick Stadium; Attendance: 6,153; Referee: Muhammad Kaleia |

| April 19 5 | Portland Hearts of Pine | 1–1 | FC Naples | Portland, Maine |
| 3:43 PM ET | Wright 36'; Barbosa (yellow card) 44'; Washington (yellow card) 63'; Kamara (yellow card) 74'; Kidd (yellow card) 85' | Report | Rose (yellow card) 77'; Glasser 87' | Stadium: Fitzpatrick Stadium; Attendance: 6,033; Referee: Gerald Flores |

| May 2 6 | Portland Hearts of Pine | 3–1 | New York Cosmos | Portland, Maine |
| 5:00 PM ET | Kamara 10'; Wright 18' 49'; Drack (yellow card) 33'; Poon-Angeron (yellow card) 81'; Barbosa (yellow card) 87'; Green (yellow card) 90+3' | Report | Chavez (yellow card) 16'; Noecker (yellow card) 19'; Milovanov (yellow card) 57'; Guenzatti 83' | Stadium: Fitzpatrick Stadium; Attendance: 6,162; Referee: Carlos Rodriguez |

| May 6 7 | Fort Wayne FC | 3–0 | Portland Hearts of Pine | Fort Wayne, Indiana |
| 7:30 PM ET | Smith (yellow card) 44'; Ricol 54', 64'; Dias (yellow card) 67'; Healy 70'; Rempel (yellow card) 77'; Abbey (yellow card) 83' | Report | Terzaghi (yellow card) 21'; Wright (yellow card) 39'; Lopez (yellow card) 59'; Drack (yellow card) 74' | Stadium: Fort Wayne FC Park; Attendance: 2,389; Referee: Izlen Peksenar |

| May 9 8 | Union Omaha | 2–2 | Portland Hearts of Pine | Omaha, Nebraska |
| 8:00 | Botello Faz (yellow card) 43'; Tekiela 60'; Caceres (yellow card) 76'; Owusu 90+5' | Report | Huck 6'; Drack (yellow card) 18'; Washington 45+1'; Murphy (yellow card) 64'; Varela (yellow card) 74'; Lopez (yellow card) 81' | Stadium: Morrison Stadium; Attendance: 2,406; Referee: Kalilou Jarju |

| May 23 9 | Portland Hearts of Pine | 1–1 | Greenville Triumph SC | Portland, Maine |
| 7:30 PM ET | Faye (yellow card) 30'; Barbosa (yellow card) 45+2'; Wright 78' (pen.) | Report | Lee (yellow card) 16'; Evans (yellow card) 52'; Liadi (yellow card) 58'; Robles 70'; Patti (red card) 76' | Stadium: Fitzpatrick Stadium; Attendance: 6,292; Referee: Edson Carvajal |

| May 30 10 | Portland Hearts of Pine | 2–1 | Spokane Velocity | Portland, Maine |
| 6:30 PM ET | Camara 62'; Varela (yellow card) 71'; Kamara 80' | Report | Fernandez (yellow card) 21'; John-Brown 45+2'; Veidman (yellow card) 85' | Stadium: Fitzpatrick Stadium; Attendance: 6,256; Referee: Igor Bych |

| June 3 11 | Corpus Christi FC | 3–2 | Portland Hearts of Pine | Corpus Christi, Texas |
| 8:30 PM ET | Bowen (yellow card) 30' (goal) 52'; Zayed (yellow card) 45+5'; Abeal (yellow card) 47'; Keegan (yellow card) 58'; Keaney (yellow card) 64'; Medina (yellow card) 90'; Morse 90+5' (o.g.); Roscoe 90+8' | Report | Green (yellow card) 35'; Evans 45+1'; Kamara 85'; Morse (yellow card) 90+3'; Mohamed (yellow card) 90+7' | Stadium: Cabaniss Athletic Complex; Attendance: 268; Referee: Atahan Yaya |

| June 13 12 | Portland Hearts of Pine | 1–2 | Chattanooga Red Wolves SC | Portland, Maine |
| 6:30 PM ET | Gonzalez 57'; Kidd (yellow card) 90+2' | Report | Morse 2' (o.g.); P. Hernandez 90'; O. Hernandez (yellow card) 90+2' | Stadium: Fitzpatrick Stadium; Attendance: 6,221; Referee: Thomas Snyder |

| June 19 13 | Westchester SC | 5–1 | Portland Hearts of Pine | Mount Vernon, New York |
| 7:00 PM ET | McGlynn 27', 45+2'; Jiménez 54', 88' (yellow card) 82'; Evans (yellow card) 62'; Diaz 72' | Report | Barbosa (yellow card) 87'; Camara 90+3' | Stadium: The Stadium at Memorial Field; Attendance: 2,350; Referee: Walterson Torchon |

| June 24 14 | Portland Hearts of Pine | 5–1 | Richmond Kickers | Portland, Maine |
| 7:00 PM ET | Green (yellow card) 16'; Gonzalez 19'; Morse (yellow card) 25'; Faye (yellow card) 25'; Wright 57' (yellow card) 65'; Georgallides 60'; Camara 70', 90+4'; Murphy (yellow card) 79'; Barbosa (yellow card) 89' | Report | Kirkland 25'; Fillion (yellow card) 25'; Amer (yellow card) 39'; Howell (yellow card) 87' | Stadium: Fitzpatrick Stadium; Attendance: 6,213; Referee: Jeremy Scheer |

| July 3 15 | FC Naples | 2–3 | Portland Hearts of Pine | Naples, Florida |
| 7:30 PM ET | Garcia 45'; Ferrín 73' | Report | Drack (yellow card) 12'; Faye 48'; Gonzalez 88'; Lopez 90+1' | Stadium: Paradise Coast Sports Complex; Attendance: 2,057; Referee: Rubiel Vazquez |

| July 8 16 | South Georgia Tormenta FC | v | Portland Hearts of Pine | Statesboro, Georgia |
| | | | | Stadium: Tormenta Stadium |
Note: Game cancelled following South Georgia Tormenta FC's withdrawal from USL League One.

| July 17 17 | Athletic Club Boise | 2–1 | Portland Hearts of Pine | Garden City, Idaho |
| 9:30 PM ET | Bodily 83'; Miller (yellow card) 90+3'; Amang (yellow card) 90+3' (goal) 90+10' | Report | Green (yellow card) 45+1'; Sing 78'; Poon-Angeron (yellow card) 89' | Stadium: Stadium at Expo Idaho; Attendance: 7,212; Referee: Robert Vincze |

| July 22 18 | Portland Hearts of Pine | 1–2 | Union Omaha | Portland, Maine |
| 7:00 PM ET | Gonzalez 9'; Lopez (yellow card) 39'; Wright (yellow card) 45+7'; Barbosa (yellow card) 75' | Report | Gutierrez 16'; Cabral 32'; Owusu (yellow card) 40'; Guediri (yellow card) 55'; Wootton (yellow card) 84' | Stadium: Fitzpatrick Stadium; Attendance: 6,239; Referee: Deny Kulasinac |

| August 1 20 | Greenville Triumph SC | 3–3 | Portland Hearts of Pine | Mauldin, South Carolina |
| 7:00 PM ET | Nour 37', 51'; Akio (yellow card) 61'; Liadi 90+3' | Report | Camara 28'; Barbosa 32'; Georgallides 40'; Drack (yellow card) 45+1' | Stadium: GE Vernova Park; Attendance: 3,135; Referee: Erick Lezama |

| August 8 21 | Portland Hearts of Pine | 0–2 | Corpus Christi FC | Portland, Maine |
| 7:44 PM ET | Barbosa (yellow card) 33'; Espinosa (yellow card) 85'; Varela (yellow card) 90+6' | Report | Bowen 19' (yellow card) 37'; Abeal (yellow card) 59'; Medina (yellow card) 72'; Keaney 84'; Dietrich (yellow card) 90+5' | Stadium: Fitzpatrick Stadium; Attendance: 6,289 |
Note: match was delayed 44 minutes due to rain and weather.

| August 16 22 | Portland Hearts of Pine | 1–2 | Forward Madison FC | Portland, Maine |
| 6:30 PM ET | Wright (yellow card) 4'; Kidd (yellow card) 10'; Rodríguez-Gentile (yellow card) 71'; Kamara (red card) 81'; Gonzalez 86' | Report | Karamoko 21'; Shannon (yellow card) 35'; Carmichael 57'; Annor (yellow card) 85'; Toure (yellow card) 90+3' | Stadium: Fitzpatrick Stadium; Attendance: 6,256; Referee: Drew Klemp |

| August 19 23 | One Knoxville SC | 1–1 | Portland Hearts of Pine | Knoxville, Tennessee |
| 7:00 PM ET | McRobb (yellow card) 78'; Diene 86' (yellow card) 86' | Report | Murphy (yellow card) 23'; Gonzalez (yellow card) 25' (goal) 57' | Stadium: Covenant Health Park; Attendance: 2,133; Referee: Steven Cardozo |

| August 22 24 | Richmond Kickers | 1–1 | Portland Hearts of Pine | Richmond, Virginia |
| 7:00 PM ET | Vazquez (yellow card) 29'; Espinal (yellow card) 66'; Kirkland 74'; Amer (yellow card) 85' | Report | Kidd 37'; Kamara (yellow card) 42' | Stadium: City Stadium; Attendance: 4,388; Referee: Alejo Calume |

| August 29 25 | Portland Hearts of Pine | 1–4 | Fort Wayne FC | Portland, Maine |
| 7:00 PM ET | Poon-Angeron (yellow card) 24'; Camara (yellow card) 34'; Wright 86' (yellow card) 90+1' | Report | Healy 8', 61'; Awoudor 40'; Nieto (yellow card) 49'; Lacey 77'; Dias (yellow card) 84'; Neidlinger (yellow card) 90+5' | Stadium: Fitzpatrick Stadium; Attendance: 6,268; Referee: Amin Hadzic |

| September 2 26 | Charlotte Independence | 3–2 | Portland Hearts of Pine | Matthews, North Carolina |
| 7:00 PM ET | Manin (yellow card) 15'; Bakero 20'; Riascos (yellow card) 35'; Pinho 90+6', 90+8' | Report | Letayf (yellow card) 37'; Kidd 59'; Poon-Angeron 65' (yellow card) 80' | Stadium: Mecklenburg County Sportsplex; Referee: Stephen Foster |

| September 6 27 | Portland Hearts of Pine | 2–1 | Westchester SC | Portland, Maine |
| 6:00 PM ET | Gonzalez 11' (pen.); Poon-Angeron (yellow card) 45'; Evans (yellow card) 77'; Camara 82' | Report | Dickerson 66' (yellow card) 81'; Guezen (yellow card) 77'; Jennings (yellow card) 79' | Stadium: Fitzpatrick Stadium; Attendance: 6,224; Referee: Igor Bych |

| September 13 28 | Portland Hearts of Pine | 1–0 | AV Alta FC | Portland, Maine |
| 6:00 PM ET | Letayf Escutia (yellow card) 62'; Kidd (yellow card) 78'; Gonzalez (yellow card) 89'; Faye 90+3'; Wright (yellow card) 90+10' | Report | Desdunes (yellow card) 41'; Alassane (yellow card) 50'; Pajaro (yellow card) 68'; Smith (yellow card) 83' | Stadium: Fitzpatrick Stadium; Attendance: 6,194; Referee: John Tamayo |

| September 19 29 | Chattanooga Red Wolves SC | 1–1 | Portland Hearts of Pine | East Ridge, Tennessee |
| 7:00 PM ET | Knapp (yellow card) 22'; Wessels (yellow card) 76'; Hernandez 90+1' | Report | Rodriguez-Gentile 39' | Stadium: CHI Memorial Stadium; Attendance: 1,088; Referee: Braeden Frey |

| September 26 30 | Portland Hearts of Pine | 1–4 | Sarasota Paradise | Portland, Maine |
| 5:00 PM ET | Faye (yellow card) 6' (yellow-red card) 90+1'; Kamara 19'; Rodríguez-Gentile (yellow card) 70'; Gonzalez (yellow card) 72'; Evans (yellow card) 90+3' | Report | Kiingi 4'; Røed 7', 42'; Gall (yellow card) 40' (goal) 51'; Rosa (yellow card) 49' | Stadium: Fitzpatrick Stadium; Referee: Elorm Atisu |
Note: Date originally scheduled to be a match against South Georgia Tormenta FC, a club that withdrew from USL League One shortly before the 2026 season.

| October 3 31 | Spokane Velocity | 3–3 | Portland Hearts of Pine | Spokane, Washington |
| 9:00 PM ET | Vinyals 38' (yellow card) 75'; Brett 39'; Hernández (yellow card) 45+3'; Lewis 45+3'; Mensah (yellow card) 86'; Spielman (yellow card) 90+7' | Report | Gonzalez (yellow card) 62' (goal) 90+8' (pen.); Rodriguez-Gentile 64'; Camara 73' | Stadium: One Spokane Stadium; Referee: Trevor Wiseman |

| October 10 32 | Portland Hearts of Pine | 1–2 | Athletic Club Boise | Portland, Maine |
| 5:00 PM ET | Letayf (yellow card) 41'; Gonzalez 74'; Green (yellow card) 82' | Report | Moshobane 54'; Amang 90+4' (yellow card) 90+5' | Stadium: Fitzpatrick Stadium; Attendance: 6,318; Referee: Nicholas Strednak |

| October 17 33 | Forward Madison FC | 2–0 | Portland Hearts of Pine | Madison, Wisconsin |
| 6:00 PM ET | Carmichael 5', 40' (pen.) | Report | Poon-Angeron (yellow card) 16'; Drack (yellow card) 39'; Faye (yellow card) 60' | Stadium: Breese Stevens Field; Attendance: 4,820; Referee: Christopher Calderon |

| October 24 34 | Portland Hearts of Pine | 3–1 | Charlotte Independence | Portland, Maine |
| 6:00 PM ET | Lopez (yellow card) 24' (goal) 53'; Camara 40', 90'; Barbosa (yellow card) 81' (goal) 83' | Report | Skinner 45'; Bakero (yellow card) 83' | Stadium: Fitzpatrick Stadium; Attendance: 6,400; Referee: Danielle Chesky |

==== Lamar Hunt US Open Cup ====
| March 17 First Round | Vermont Green FC | 1–0 | Portland Hearts of Pine | Burlington, Vermont |
| 7:30 PM EST | Zellefrow (yellow card) 25'; Ismail 40' | Report | Wright (yellow card) 76' | Stadium: Virtue Field; Attendance: 2,500; Referee: Gurhan Dolgun |

=== USL Cup ===
| April 25 1 | Westchester SC | 2–2 (5–4 p) | Portland Hearts of Pine | Mount Vernon, New York |
| 7:00 | McGlynn 24' (pen.); Dickerson (yellow card) 44'; Burko 50' | Report | Espinosa 7' (yellow card) 28'; Terzaghi (yellow card) 49'; Washington (yellow card) 65'; Kidd (yellow card) 65'; Lopez (yellow card) 70'; Wright 84' (yellow card) 90' | Stadium: Stadium at Memorial Field; Attendance: 1,056; Referee: Amin Hadzic |
| | Penalties |
| | Guezen (penalty scored); Burko (penalty scored); Blommestijn (penalty scored); Jiménez (penalty missed); Bouman (penalty scored); Armas (penalty scored) | | (penalty scored) Wright; (penalty missed) Huck; (penalty scored) Kamara; (penalty scored) Georgallides; (penalty scored) Green; (penalty missed) Evans |

| May 16 2 | Portland Hearts of Pine | 2–1 | Rhode Island FC | Portland, Maine |
| | Kidd 3'; Wright 27' (pen.); Washington (yellow card) 67' | Report | Kwizera (yellow card) 48'; Dorsey 61' | Stadium: Fitzpatrick Stadium; Attendance: 6,307; Referee: Calin Radosav |

| June 7 3 | Brooklyn FC | 5–1 | Portland Hearts of Pine | Brooklyn, New York |
| 3:30 PM ET | Anderson 8', 70'; Stojanovic 36', 45+2'; Vancaeyezeele 55'; Latinovich (yellow card) 75' | Report | Camara 19'; Kamara (red card) 59'; Green (yellow card) 60' | Stadium: Maimonides Park; Attendance: 1,977; Referee: Matthew Corrigan |

| July 11 4 | Portland Hearts of Pine | 1–1 (4–2 p) | New York Cosmos | Portland, Maine |
| 7:00 PM ET | Hersi (yellow card) 28'; Gonzalez 80'; Barbosa (yellow card) 85' | Report | Sidoel (yellow card) 34'; Marsh 60' | Stadium: Fitzpatrick Stadium; Attendance: 6,231; Referee: Joe Surgan |
| | Penalties |
| | Drack (penalty scored); Barbosa (penalty scored); Huck (penalty scored); Gonzalez (penalty scored) | | (penalty missed) Spengler; (penalty scored) Zielonka; (penalty scored) Mendonca; (penalty missed) Guenzatti |

== Honors and awards ==
=== Monthly Awards ===
==== USL League One Player of the Month ====
| Month | Player | Position | Ref |
|---|---|---|---|
| May | (England) Ollie Wright | MF | |

=== Weekly Awards ===
==== USL League One Team of the Week ====
| Week | Player | Opponent | Position | Ref |
|---|---|---|---|---|
| 2 | (Japan) Masashi Wada | New York Cosmos | MF | |
| 2 | (United States) Hunter Morse | New York Cosmos | GK | |
| 2 | (England) Ollie Wright | New York Cosmos | Bench | |
| 3 | (United States) Kash Oladapo | AV Alta FC | Bench | |
| 6 | (Trinidad and Tobago) Michel Poon-Angeron | One Knoxville SC | MF | |
| 7 | (United States) Josh Drack | FC Naples | DF | |
| 7 | (England) Ollie Wright | FC Naples | MF | |
| 8/9 | (Sierra Leone) Jay Tee Kamara | New York Cosmos | MF | |
| 8/9 | (England) Ollie Wright | New York Cosmos | FW | |
| 11/12 | (England) Ollie Wright | Greenville Triumph SC | Bench | |
| 13 | (Sierra Leone) Jay Tee Kamara | Spokane Velocity | MF | |
| 13 | (England) Ollie Wright | Spokane Velocity | Bench | |
| 17/18 | (Cyprus) Konstantinos Georgallides | Richmond Kickers and FC Naples | MF | |
| 17/18 | (Guinea) Aboubacar Camara | Richmond Kickers and FC Naples | FW | |
| 17/18 | (United States) Bobby Murphy | Richmond Kickers and FC Naples | Head Coach | |
| 17/18 | (United States) Jaden Jones-Riley | Richmond Kickers and FC Naples | Bench | |
| 17/18 | (United States) Diego Gonzalez | Richmond Kickers and FC Naples | Bench | |
| 19/20 | (United States) Hunter Morse | Athletic Club Boise | Bench | |
| 22 | (Cyprus) Konstantinos Georgallides | Greenville Triumph SC | FW | |
| 22 | (United States) Diego Gonzalez | Greenville Triumph SC | Bench | |
| 22 | (Guinea) Aboubacar Camara | Greenville Triumph SC | Bench | |
| 25 | (United States) Hunter Morse | One Knoxville SC and Richmond Kickers | GK | |
| 28 | (Senegal) Serigne Mbacke Faye | AV Alta FC | DF | |
| 28 | (Japan) Eiji Hata | AV Alta FC | Bench | |
| 31 | (United States) Diego Gonzalez | Spokane Velocity | MF | |
| 33 | (United States) Kash Oladapo | Forward Madison FC | Bench | |
| 34 | (United States) Josh Drack | Charlotte Independence | DF | |
| 34 | (Guinea) Aboubacar Camara | Charlotte Independence | FW | |

==== USL League One Player of the Week ====
| Week | Player | Opponent | Position | Ref |
|---|---|---|---|---|
| 8/9 | (England) Ollie Wright | New York Cosmos | FW | |
| 17/18 | (Guinea) Aboubacar Camara | Richmond Kickers and FC Naples | FW | |
| 34 | (Guinea) Aboubacar Camara | Charlotte Independence | FW | |

==== USL League One Goal of the Week ====
| Week | Player | Opponent | Position | Ref |
|---|---|---|---|---|
| 8/9 | (England) Ollie Wright | New York Cosmos | FW | |
| 30 | (Sierra Leone) Jay Tee Kamara | Sarasota Paradise | FW | |

==== USL League One Save of the Week ====
| Week | Player | Opponent | Ref |
|---|---|---|---|
| 3 | (United States) Kash Oladapo | AV Alta FC | |
| 27 | (United States) Hunter Morse | Westchester SC | |
| 29 | (United States) Hunter Morse | Chattanooga Red Wolves SC | |

=== USL Cup Awards ===
==== Prinx Tires USL Cup Team of the Round ====
| Week | Player | Opponent | Position | Ref |
|---|---|---|---|---|
| 2 | (United States) Bobby Murphy | Rhode Island FC | Head Coach | |
| 2 | (England) Ollie Wright | Rhode Island FC | Bench | |

==== Prinx Tires USL Cup Save of the Round ====
| Week | Player | Opponent | Ref |
|---|---|---|---|
| 2 | (United States) Hunter Morse | Rhode Island FC | |
