= 2026 AV Alta FC season =

AV Alta
2026 season
- Owner: John Smelzer; J. David Harden; Bob Roback
- President: John Smelzer
- Head coach: Brian Kleiban
- Stadium: Lancaster Municipal Stadium
- USL League One: 13th
- U.S. Open Cup: First Round
- USL Cup: Group Stage
- USL Playoffs: Did Not Qualify
- Top goalscorer: League: (United States) Adam Aoumaich (10 Goals); All: (United States) Adam Aoumaich (11 Goals)
- Highest home attendance: 5,024 vs Corpus Christi FC October 24
- Lowest home attendance: 2,710 vs Sarasota Paradise June 10, 1,518 vs Valley 559 FC March 18 (US Open Cup)
- Average home league attendance: 3,869, with U.S. Open Cup 3,730, with USL Cup 3,660, without US Open Cup 3,779
- Biggest win: AV Alta FC 4–0 New York Cosmos May 23
- Biggest defeat: AV Alta FC 1–3 Union Omaha April 4 Spokane Velocity 3–1 AV Alta FC April 7 El Paso Locomotive FC 2–0 AV Alta FC May 27 (USL Cup); Union Omaha 3–1 AV Alta FC July 1

The 2026 AV Alta FC season was the second season in the club's existence as well as their second in USL League One, the third-tier of American soccer.

== Players and staff ==
=== Current roster ===
As of March 24, 2026

Note: Flags indicate national team as defined under FIFA eligibility rules; some limited exceptions apply. Players may hold more than one non-FIFA nationality.

No.	Pos.	Nation	Player
2	DF	USA	Christian Ortiz
3	DF	USA	Alfredo Ortiz
4	DF	COL	Miguel Pajaro
5	MF	BEN	Maboumou Alassane
6	MF	PAN	Osvaldo Lay
7	MF	HAI	Jerry Desdunes
9	FW	USA	Joaquin Acuna
10	MF	USA	Miguel Ibarra
11	MF	FRA	Ilias Aoumaich
12	DF	USA	Nick Relerford
15	DF	NOR	Mathias Winum
16	DF	USA	Erick Gonzalez
17	MF	PHI	Javier Mariona
18	MF	USA	Adam Aoumaich
19	FW	JAM	Collin Anderson

No.	Pos.	Nation	Player
20	FW	GHA	Godwin Antwi
21	MF	USA	Jimmie Villalobos
22	GK	TTO	Denzil Smith
23	MF	USA	Renden Thomas
27	GK	USA	Djibril Doumbia
30	GK	USA	Marco Gonzalez
32	MF	USA	Elliott Jahng
34	GK	USA	Desi Nelson
41	MF	USA	Erik Hernandez Jr
42	DF	USA	Juaquin Garcia Jr.
44	DF	BUL	Kaloyan Pehlivanov
45	DF	USA	Steven Ramos
47	FW	USA	Jose Lopez
99	MF	USA	Cesar Bahena

1. USL Academy Contract

== Transfers ==
=== In ===
Date	Position	Number	Name	from	Type	Fee	Ref.
May 15, 2026	GK	27	(United States) Djibril Doumbia	(United States) New Mexico United	End of Loan	NA	
January 28, 2026	FW	20	(Ghana) Godwin Antwi	(United States) San Diego Toreros	signing	NA	
January 29, 2026	MF	11	(France) Ilias Aoumaich	(France) Pau FC	signing	NA	
January 31, 2026	FW	19	(Jamaica) Collin Anderson	(Oman) Al-Khaboura SC	signing	NA	
February 3, 2026	DF	42	(United States) Juaquin Garcia	(United States) AV Alta FC Academy	Academy Contract	NA	
February 4, 2026	GK	34	(United States) Desi Nelson	(United States) AV Alta FC Academy	Academy Contract	NA	
February 5, 2026	DF	15	(Norway) Mathias Winum	(United States) UC Irvine Anteaters	signing	NA	
February 7, 2026	MF	23	(United States) Renden Thomas	(United States) LA FC Academy	signing	NA	
February 8, 2026	DF	12	(United States) Nick Relerford	(United States) Cal State Fullerton Titans	signing	NA	
February 9, 2026	MF	32	(United States) Elliott Jahng	(United States) AV Alta FC Academy	Academy Contract	NA	
March 2, 2026	DF	3	(United States) Alfredo Ortiz	(United States) California Golden Bears	signing	NA	
March 4, 2026	MF	99	(United States) Cesar Bahena	(United States) San Diego Toreros	signing	NA	
March 6, 2026	FW	47	(United States) Jose Lopez	(United States) AV Alta FC Academy	Academy Contract	NA	
March 24, 2026	GK	30	(United States) Marco Gonzalez	(United States) AV Alta FC Academy	Academy Contract	NA	

=== Out ===
Date	Position	Number	Name	To	Type	Fee	Ref.
December 12, 2025	MF	19	(United States) Sebastian Cruz	(United States) Tampa Bay Rowdies	Signing	NA	
December 13, 2025	FW	8	(Nigeria) Emmanuel Alaribe	(United States) [[]]	Roster Decisions	NA	
December 13, 2025	DF	8	(Haiti) Ashkanov Apollon	(United States) [[]]	Roster Decisions	NA	
December 13, 2025	GK	23	(Mexico) Carlos Avilez	(United States) [[]]	Roster Decisions	NA	
December 13, 2025	FW	11	(El Salvador) Alexis Cerritos	(United States) Corpus Christi FC	Roster Decisions	NA	
December 13, 2025	DF	3	(United States) Elijah Martin	(United States) Valley 559 FC	Roster Decisions	NA	
December 13, 2025	DF	80	(El Salvador) Walmer Martinez	(United States) [[]]	Roster Decisions	NA	
December 13, 2025	DF	4	(Italy) Luca Mastrantonio	(United States) FC Naples	Roster Decisions	NA	
December 17, 2025	MF	30	(United States) Eduardo Blancas	(United States) Monterey Bay FC	signing	NA	
December 20, 2025	MF	35	(United States) Harrison Robledo	(United States) [[]]	Roster Decisions	NA	

== Non-competitive fixtures ==
=== Friendlies ===
February 21	Orange County SC	v	AV Alta FC	Irvine, California
				Stadium: Championship Soccer Stadium

== Competitive fixtures ==
=== Regular Season ===
March 7 1	AV Alta FC	1–1	Richmond Kickers	Lancaster, California
8:30 PM PDT	Desdunes 27' (pen.); Relerford (yellow card) 50'; Pehlivanov (yellow card) 90+4'	Report	Kirkland 9'; Barnathan (yellow card) 52'; Murana (yellow card) 74'	Stadium: Lancaster Municipal Stadium; Attendance: 4,508; Referee: Corbyn May

March 14 2	South Georgia Tormenta FC	v	AV Alta FC	Statesboro, Georgia
				Stadium: Tormenta Stadium
Note: Game cancelled following South Georgia Tormenta FC's withdrawal from USL League One.

March 21 3	AV Alta FC	0–0	Portland Hearts of Pine	Lancaster, California
7:30 PM PT	Ramos (yellow card) 44'; Pajaro (yellow card) 72'	Report	Lopez (yellow card) 6' (yellow-red card) 58'; Armour (yellow card) 34'; Kamara (yellow card) 45+2'	Stadium: Lancaster Municipal Stadium; Attendance: 3,561; Referee: Robert Vincze

March 28 4	AV Alta FC	2–2	Chattanooga Red Wolves SC	Lancaster, California
7:30 PM PT	Aoumaich 3'; Pajaro (red card) 60'; Anderson 67'; Antwi (yellow card) 90+4'	Report	Adewole 19'; O. Hernandez 26' (pen.); Acosta (yellow card) 45'; P. Hernández (yellow card) 49'; Kinzner (yellow card) 72'; Jolley (yellow card) 75'; Lombardi (yellow card) 90+2'	Stadium: Lancaster Municipal Stadium; Attendance: 3,528; Referee: Dion Coxe-Trieger

April 4 5	AV Alta FC	1–3	Union Omaha	Lancaster, California
7:30 PM PT	Relerford (yellow card) 17'; Desdunes (yellow card) 40'; Kleiban (yellow card) 43'; Ortiz 90+3'	Report	Tekiela 8'; Faz 20' (pen.); Billhardt 82'	Stadium: Lancaster Municipal Stadium; Attendance: 3,204; Referee: Jaclyn Metz

April 7 6	Spokane Velocity	3–1	AV Alta FC	Spokane, Washington
6:00 PM PT	Booth 45'; John-Brown 55'; Vinyals 90+3'	Report	Lay 7'; Aoumaich (yellow card) 46'; Anderson (yellow card) 55'; Kleiban (yellow card) 83'	Stadium: One Spokane Stadium; Attendance: 1,732; Referee: Trevor Wiseman

April 11 7	AV Alta FC	2–2	Athletic Club Boise	Lancaster, California
7:30 PM PT	Aoumaich 23'; Lay (yellow card) 48'; Ibarra (yellow card) 56'; Desdunes 79'; Pehlivanov (yellow card) 81'	Report	Kostyshyn 14' (yellow card) 35'; Dengler (yellow card) 56'; Moon 59'; Mayaka (yellow card) 82'; Amang (yellow card) 83'	Stadium: Lancaster Municipal Stadium; Attendance: 3,209; Referee: Steven Cardozo

May 2 8	AV Alta FC	v	South Georgia Tormenta FC	Lancaster, California
				Stadium: Lancaster Municipal Stadium
Note: Game cancelled following South Georgia Tormenta FC's withdrawal from USL League One.

May 9 9	AV Alta FC	2–0	Forward Madison FC	Lancaster, California
7:30 PM PT	Desdunes 6' (pen.); Antwi 21'; Pajaro (red card) 44'; Smith (yellow card) 57'; Ibarra (yellow card) 76'	Report	Torres (yellow card) 19'; Carmichael (yellow card) 60'; Munjoma (yellow card) 82'; Gyamfi (yellow card) 89'	Stadium: Lancaster Municipal Stadium; Attendance: 4,109; Referee: Mark Verso

May 16 10	Sarasota Paradise	1–2	AV Alta FC	Lakewood Ranch, Florida
4:30 PM PT	Rosa 49'; Linderoth (yellow card) 53'; Watters (yellow card) 90+1'	Report	Desdunes 33'; Aoumaich 76' (pen.); Ibarra (yellow card) 90+3'	Stadium: Premier Sports Campus; Attendance: 1,658; Referee: Braeden Frey

May 23 11	AV Alta FC	4–0	New York Cosmos	Lancaster, California
7:30 PM ET	Antwi 8'; Aoumaich 43', 55' (yellow card) 60'; Higareda 71'; Ortiz (yellow card) 79'	Report	Guenzatti (yellow card) 57'; Mendonca (yellow card) 83'; Bohui (yellow card) 88'	Stadium: Lancaster Municipal Stadium; Attendance: 4,003; Referee: Anthony Almeida

May 30 12	Fort Wayne FC	0–0	AV Alta FC	Fort Wayne, Indiana
7:30 PM ET	Sproat (yellow card) 26'; Jordan (yellow card) 51'; Dias (yellow card) 90+4'	Report	Alassane (yellow card) 33' (yellow-red card) 47'; Aoumaich (yellow card) 51'; Smith (yellow card) 67'	Stadium: Ruoff Mortgage Stadium; Attendance: 3,925; Referee: Alex Beehler

June 10 13	AV Alta FC	3–1	Sarasota Paradise	Lancaster, California
7:00 PM PT	Bahena Jr. 5'; C. Ortiz 18'; Aoumaich (yellow card) 62'; Antwi 77'	Report	Bender (yellow card) 72'; Watters (yellow card) 75'; Burlew 90+1'	Stadium: Lancaster Municipal Stadium; Attendance: 2,710; Referee: Kalilou Jarju

June 13 14	AV Alta FC	1–0	Spokane Velocity	Lancaster, California
8:00 PM PT	Pajaro (yellow card) 41'; Kleiban (yellow card) 57'; Higareda (yellow card) 60'; Pehlivanov (yellow card) 64'; Lay (yellow card) 69'; Anderson 79'	Report	Margvelashvili (yellow card) 90+3'	Stadium: Lancaster Municipal Stadium; Attendance: 2,813; Referee: Ivan de Cristofaro

June 20 15	Greenville Triumph SC	1–2	AV Alta FC	Mauldin, South Carolina
3:00 PM PT	Patti (yellow card) 3'; Dixon (yellow card) 22' (red card) 90+7'; Fricke 38'; Evans (yellow card) 66'	Report	C. Ortiz 72'; Bahena 87'	Stadium: GE Vernova Park; Attendance: 3,365; Referee: Muhammad Kaleia

June 24 16	Corpus Christi FC	0–0	AV Alta FC	Corpus Christi, Texas
5:30 PM PT	Keegan (yellow card) 29'	Report	Relerford (yellow card) 24'; Anderson (yellow card) 46'; Kwakwa (yellow card) 55'; Aoumaich (yellow card) 85'	Stadium: Cabaniss Athletic Complex; Attendance: 1,332; Referee: Elton García

July 1 17	Union Omaha	3–1	AV Alta FC	Omaha, Nebraska
6:30 PM PT	Lawrence (yellow card) 52'; Kallman (yellow card) 57'; Faz 74'; Cabral 81'; Gómez 87'	Report	Aoumaich 31'; Desdunes (yellow card) 80'	Stadium: Morrison Stadium; Attendance: 2,724; Referee: Matthew Corrigan

July 5 18	AV Alta FC	1–1	Charlotte Independence	Lancaster, California
8:00 PM ET	Ortiz (yellow card) 36'; Desdunes 90+1'	Report	Bakero 21' (pen.); Jaime (yellow card) 57'; Marou (yellow card) 79'; Guffroy (yellow card) 87'	Stadium: Lancaster Municipal Stadium; Attendance: 4,347; Referee: Trevor Wiseman

July 15 19	Chattanooga Red Wolves SC	1–0	AV Alta FC	East Ridge, Tennessee
4:00 PM PT	Mensah 17'; Kelly (yellow card) 45+1'; Mercer (yellow card) 61'; Ayimbila (yellow card) 81'	Report	Pehlivanov (yellow card) 54'	Stadium: CHI Memorial Stadium; Attendance: 1,322; Referee: Amin Hadzic

July 18 20	One Knoxville SC	2–3	AV Alta FC	Knoxville, Tennessee
4:30 PM PT	Baker 22'; Rosamilia 89'	Report	Bahena Jr. 26'; Desdunes 67'; Aoumaich 75'	Stadium: Covenant Health Park; Attendance: 5,205; Referee: Drew Klemp

July 25 21	AV Alta FC	0–0	Westchester SC	Lancaster, California
8:00 PM PT	Pehlivanov (yellow card) 84'; C. Ortiz (yellow card) 85'	Report	Timchenko (yellow card) 31'; Powder (yellow card) 82'; Pierre (yellow card) 83'	Stadium: Lancaster Municipal Stadium; Attendance: 3,436; Referee: Anthony Sobolevsky

August 1 22	Richmond Kickers	3–2	AV Alta FC	Richmond, Virginia
4:00 PM PT	Freeman 22' (yellow card) 45+4'; O'Malley (yellow card) 64'; Vinberg (yellow card) 67'; Kirkland 75' (yellow card) 85'; Fillion (yellow card) 77'; Bolduc 79'	Report	Villalobos 48' (yellow card) 50'; Relerford (yellow card) 74'; Desdunes (yellow card) 84'; Acuña 87'	Stadium: City Stadium; Attendance: 3,866; Referee: José Lara

August 5 23	FC Naples	2–1	AV Alta FC	Naples, Florida
4:30 PM PT	Miglietti 45+3' (yellow card) 47'; Gray (yellow card) 50'; Cisneros (yellow card) 74'; Garcia (yellow card) 80'; Ferrín 90'	Report	Pehlivanov (yellow card) 68'; C. Ortiz (yellow card) 69'; Desdunes 73' (pen.); A. Ortiz (yellow card) 83'; Acuña (yellow card) 90+3'	Stadium: Paradise Coast Sports Complex; Attendance: 2,017; Referee: Deny Kulasinac

August 8 24	AV Alta FC	3–0	Fort Wayne FC	Lancaster, California
8:00 PM PT	Desdunes 37'; Villalobos (yellow card) 47'; Ibarra 54'; Relerford (yellow card) 87'; Acuña 90'	Report	Smith (yellow card) 45+1'; Jordan (yellow card) 59'; Oyetunde (yellow card) 87'	Stadium: Lancaster Municipal Stadium; Attendance: 3,708; Referee: Igor Bych

August 15 25	New York Cosmos	1–0	AV Alta FC	Paterson, New Jersey
4:00 PM PDT	Ramos (yellow card) 39'; Guenzatti 61'	Report	Ortiz (yellow card) 52'; Kleiban (yellow card) 54'; Relerford (yellow card) 58'; Pehlivanov (yellow card) 67'; Bahena (yellow card) 86'	Stadium: Hinchliffe Stadium; Attendance: 1,174; Referee: Alejo Calume

August 22 26	AV Alta FC	1–2	FC Naples	Lancaster, California
8:00 PM PT	Acuña 45'; Relerford (red card) 45+2'; Alassane (yellow card) 90+4'	Report	Mesias (yellow card) 31'; Ferrín 65'; Osorio (yellow card) 88'; Likulia 90+5' (yellow card) 90+6'	Stadium: Lancaster Municipal Stadium; Attendance: 4,522; Referee: Abdu-Razzaq Juma

August 29 27	Charlotte Independence	5–0	AV Alta FC	Matthews, North Carolina
4:00 PM PT	Bakero 9', 45+3'; Marou 14'; Manin (yellow card) 34' (goal) 45'; Skinner (yellow card) 47'; Martínez 81'	Report	Kleiban (yellow card) 23'; Pehlivanov (yellow card) 45+2'; Antwi (yellow card) 79'	Stadium: Sportsplex at Matthews; Attendance: 752; Referee: Kevin Broadley

September 5 28	AV Alta FC	1–2	One Knoxville SC	Lancaster, California
7:30 PM PT	I. Aoumaich 21' (yellow card) 37' (yellow-red card) 49'; C. Ortiz (yellow card) 80'; Kleiban (yellow card) 80'	Report	Murphy 5'; Fuller (yellow card) 38'; Perkins (yellow card) 45+2'; Caputo (yellow card) 59'; Conway 90+2'	Stadium: Lancaster Municipal Stadium; Attendance: 4,604; Referee: Robert Vincze

September 13 29	Portland Hearts of Pine	1–0	AV Alta FC	Portland, Maine
4:00 PM PT	Letayf Escutia (yellow card) 62'; Kidd (yellow card) 78'; Gonzalez (yellow card) 89'; Faye 90+3'; Wright (yellow card) 90+10'	Report	Desdunes (yellow card) 41'; Alassane (yellow card) 50'; Pajaro (yellow card) 68'; Smith (yellow card) 83'	Stadium: Fitzpatrick Stadium; Attendance: 6,194; Referee: John Tamayo

September 19 30	Forward Madison FC	3–0	AV Alta FC	Madison, Wisconsin
4:00 PM PT	Munjoma (yellow card) 16' (goal) 20'; Carmichael (yellow card) 19' (goal) 84'; Shannon (yellow card) 42'; Glaeser (yellow card) 43'; Edwards (yellow card) 90+3'; Bolma 90+7'	Report	Alassane (yellow card) 12'; Thomas (yellow card) 28'; Lay (yellow card) 37'; Acuña (yellow card) 44'; Jahng (red card) 80'	Stadium: Breese Stevens Field; Attendance: 3,631; Referee: Justin St. Pierre

October 3 31	Westchester SC	2–1	AV Alta FC	Mount Vernon, New York
4:00 PM ET	Burko 20'; McGlynn 34' (pen.); Dickerson (yellow card) 60'; Loura (yellow card) 64'; Mackic (yellow card) 86'; Blommestijn (yellow card) 90+1'; Powder (yellow card) 90+1'	Report	Aoumaich (yellow card) 22'; Kleiban (yellow card) 78'; Lay 90+6'	Stadium: The Stadium at Memorial Field; Attendance: 1,942; Referee: Danielle Chesky

October 10 32	AV Alta FC	2–2	Greenville Triumph SC	Lancaster, California
7:30 PM ET	Winum (yellow card) 38'; Bahena Jr. (yellow card) 45+5' (goal) 45+5'; Aoumaich 58'; Thomas (yellow card) 65'; Gonzalez (yellow card) 69'	Report	Liadi 4', 36' (yellow card) 74'; Agyaakwah (yellow card) 44'; Nour (yellow card) 45+3'; Sims (yellow card) 90+1'	Stadium: Lancaster Municipal Stadium; Attendance: 4,610; Referee: Steven Cardozo

October 17 33	Athletic Club Boise	2–1	AV Alta FC	Garden City, Idaho
4:00 PM PT	Barea 16', 74'; Gasso (yellow card) 41'; Kostyshyn (yellow card) 58'; Ndiaye (yellow card) 59'; Kliewer (yellow card) 90+1'; Crull (yellow card) 90+3'	Report	Pajaro (yellow card) 29'; Bahena (yellow card) 56'; Kleiban (yellow card) 62'; Smith (yellow card) 75'; Aoumaich 78'; Ibarra (yellow card) 90+4'; Desdunes (yellow card) 90+5'; Higareda (yellow card) 90+8'	Stadium: Stadium at Expo Idaho; Attendance: 7,254; Referee: Alex Beehler

October 24 34	AV Alta FC	2–2	Corpus Christi FC	Lancaster, California
6:30 PM PT	Anderson 8'; A. Aoumaich 42'; Pehlivanov (yellow card) 69'	Report	Keegan 13'; Pondeca (yellow card) 56'; Abeal 85'	Stadium: Lancaster Municipal Stadium; Attendance: 5,024; Referee: Trevor Wiseman

=== Lamar Hunt US Open Cup ===
March 18 First Round	AV Alta FC	0–1	Valley 559 FC	Lancaster, California
7:30 PM PDT	Anderson (yellow card) 56'; Ortiz (yellow card) 90+5'	Report	Tovar (yellow card) 45'; Amarikwa 65'; Gamez (yellow card) 90+3'	Stadium: Lancaster Municipal Stadium; Attendance: 1,518; Referee: Rafael Bonilla

=== USL Cup ===
April 25 Group Stage	New Mexico United	2–1	AV Alta FC	Albuquerque, New Mexico
6:00 PM PT	Harris 36'; LaCava (yellow card) 45+3'; Bailey (yellow card) 57'; Rennicks 74'; Howell (yellow card) 78'	Report	Desdunes (yellow card) 4' (yellow-red card) 64'; I. Aoumaich 18'; Alassane (yellow card) 21'; Lay (yellow card) 37'; Pehlivanov (yellow card) 47'; Pajaro (yellow card) 86'	Stadium: Isotopes Park; Attendance: 9,605; Referee: Benjamin Meyer

May 27 Group Stage	El Paso Locomotive FC	2–0	AV Alta FC	El Paso, Texas
4:00 PM PT	Mendez (yellow card) 31'; Moreno (yellow card) 33'; Dollenmayer 72'; Abitia (yellow card) 74' (goal) 79'; Diaz (yellow card) 90+3'	Report	A. Aoumaich (yellow card) 17'	Stadium: Southwest University Park; Attendance: 5,042; Referee: Justin St. Pierre

June 6 Group Stage	AV Alta FC	2–1	Orange County SC	Lancaster, California
7:00 PM PT	Lay (yellow card) 33'; Anderson 42'; Mariona (yellow card) 57'; I. Aoumaich 76' (yellow card) 89'; Villalobos (yellow card) 86'	Report	Brewitt 27'	Stadium: Lancaster Municipal Stadium; Attendance: 3,206; Referee: Brandon Stevis

July 11 Group Stage	AV Alta FC	2–1	Phoenix Rising FC	Lancaster, California
7:00 PM PT	A. Aoumaich 12' (pen.); Bahena 32' (yellow card) 45'; Pehlivanov (yellow card) 39'; Higareda (yellow card) 89'; Kleiban (yellow card) 89'	Report	Moursou (yellow card) 24'; Pelayo (yellow card) 45'; Rivera (yellow card) 65'; Studenhofft 71'; Ping (yellow card) 72'; Ramirez (yellow card) 90+4'	Stadium: Lancaster Municipal Stadium; Attendance: 2,911; Referee: Ivan de Cristofaro

=== Appearances and goals ===
No.	Pos	Nat	Player	Total		USL League One		Lamar Hunt US Open Cup		USL Cup		USL League One Playoffs	
No.	Pos	Nat	Player	Apps	Goals	Apps	Goals	Apps	Goals	Apps	Goals	Apps	Goals
2	DF	(United States) USA	Christian Ortiz	32	3	16+11	3	0+1	0	3+1	0	0+0	0
3	DF	(United States) USA	Alfredo Ortiz	26	0	23+1	0	1+0	0	1+0	0	0+0	0
4	DF	(Colombia) COL	Miguel Pajaro	24	0	18+2	0	1+0	0	3+0	0	0+0	0
5	MF	(Benin) BEN	Maboumou Alassane	24	0	14+5	0	1+0	0	3+1	0	0+0	0
6	MF	(Panama) PAN	Osvaldo Lay	33	1	22+6	1	1+0	0	4+0	0	0+0	0
7	MF	(Haiti) HAI	Jerry Desdunes	26	8	22+3	8	0+0	0	1+0	0	0+0	0
9	FW	(United States) USA	Joaquin Acuna	11	3	5+5	3	0+0	0	0+1	0	0+0	0
10	MF	(United States) USA	Miguel Ibarra	28	1	7+18	1	0+0	0	1+2	0	0+0	0
11	FW	(France) FRA	Ilias Aoumaich	17	3	8+6	1	0+0	0	2+1	2	0+0	0
12	DF	(United States) USA	Nick Relerford	29	0	20+6	0	1+0	0	2+0	0	0+0	0
15	DF	(Norway) NOR	Mathias Winum	14	0	3+9	0	0+0	0	2+0	0	0+0	0
16	DF	(United States) USA	Erick Gonzalez	25	0	19+4	0	0+0	0	2+0	0	0+0	0
17	MF	(Philippines) PHI	Javier Mariona	8	0	1+4	0	1+0	0	1+1	0	0+0	0
18	MF	(United States) USA	Adam Aoumaich	33	11	24+5	10	0+1	0	3+0	1	0+0	0
19	FW	(Jamaica) JAM	Collin Anderson	25	4	9+12	3	1+0	0	3+0	1	0+0	0
20	FW	(Ghana) GHA	Godwin Antwi	31	3	11+15	3	1+0	0	0+4	0	0+0	0
21	MF	(United States) USA	Jimmie Villalobos	33	1	26+2	1	0+1	0	1+3	0	0+0	0
22	GK	(Trinidad and Tobago) TTO	Denzil Smith	29	0	26+1	0	1+0	0	1+0	0	0+0	0
23	MF	(United States) USA	Renden Thomas	16	0	9+4	0	0+1	0	1+1	0	0+0	0
24	DF	(United States) USA	Santiago Higareda	21	1	3+15	1	0+0	0	2+1	0	0+0	0
27	GK	(United States) USA	Djibril Doumbia	8	0	4+2	0	0+0	0	2+0	0	0+0	0
30	GK	(United States) USA	Marco Gonzalez	3	0	2+0	0	0+0	0	1+0	0	0+0	0
32	MF	(United States) USA	Elliot Zhang	7	0	3+3	0	0+0	0	0+1	0	0+0	0
34	GK	(United States) USA	Desi Nelson	0	0	0+0	0	0+0	0	0+0	0	0+0	0
41	MF	(United States) USA	Erik Hernandez	1	0	0+0	0	0+0	0	0+1	0	0+0	0
42	DF	(United States) USA	Juaquin Garcia Jr.	0	0	0+0	0	0+0	0	0+0	0	0+0	0
44	DF	(Bulgaria) BUL	Kaloyan Pehlivanov	33	0	28+1	0	1+0	0	3+0	0	0+0	0
52	DF	(United States) USA	Steven Ramos	15	0	1+12	0	0+1	0	0+1	0	0+0	0
47	FW	(United States) USA	Jose Lopez	0	0	0+0	0	0+0	0	0+0	0	0+0	0
99	MF	(United States) USA	Cesar Bahena Jr.	35	5	28+3	4	1+0	0	2+1	1	0+0	0

=== Top goalscorers ===
Rank	Position	Number	Name	USL1 Season	U.S. Open Cup	USL Cup	USL League One Playoffs	Total
1	MF	18	(United States) Adam Aoumaich	10	0	1	0	11
2	MF	7	(Haiti) Jerry Desdunes	8	0	0	0	8
3	DF	99	(United States) Cesar Bahena Jr.	4	0	1	0	5
4	FW	19	(Jamaica) Collin Anderson	3	0	1	0	4
5	DF	2	(United States) Christian Ortiz	3	0	0	0	3
5	FW	9	(United States) Joaquin Acuna	3	0	0	0	3
5	FW	20	(Ghana) Godwin Antwi	3	0	0	0	3
5	FW	11	(France) Ilias Aoumaich	1	0	2	0	3
9	MF	6	(Panama) Osvaldo Lay	2	0	0	0	2
10	MF	10	(United States) Miguel Ibarra	1	0	0	0	1
10	MF	24	(United States) Jimmie Villalobos	1	0	0	0	1
10	DF	24	(United States) Santiago Higareda	1	0	0	0	1
Total				40	0	5	0	45

=== Assist scorers ===
Rank	Position	Number	Name	USL1 Season	U.S. Open Cup	USL Cup	USL League One Playoffs	Total
1	MF	7	(Haiti) Jerry Desdunes	7	0	0	0	7
2	MF	18	(United States) Adam Aoumaich	4	0	0	0	4
2	FW	99	(United States) Cesar Bahena Jr.	4	0	0	0	4
4	MF	6	(Panama) Osvaldo Lay	2	0	0	0	2
4	FW	11	(France) Ilias Aoumaich	2	0	0	0	2
4	DF	2	(United States) Christian Ortiz	1	0	1	0	2
4	MF	21	(United States) Jimmie Villalobos	1	0	1	0	2
4	MF	23	(United States) Rendon Thomas	1	0	1	0	2
4	MF	32	(United States) Elliot Zhang	1	0	1	0	2
10	MF	16	(United States) Erick Gonzalez	1	0	0	0	1
10	FW	19	(Jamaica) Collin Anderson	1	0	0	0	1
10	DF	24	(United States) Santiago Higareda	1	0	0	0	1
Total				26	0	4	0	30

=== Clean sheets ===
Rank	Name	USL1 Season	U.S. Open Cup	USL Cup	USL League One Playoffs	Total
1	(Trinidad and Tobago) Denzil Smith	6	0	0	0	6
2	(United States) Djibril Doumbia	1	0	0	0	1
Total		7	0	0	0	7

=== Disciplinary record ===
No.	Pos.	Player	USL League One Regular Season			Lamar Hunt US Open Cup			USL Cup			USL League One Playoffs			Total		
No.	Pos.	Player	Yellow card	(yellow card) (yellow-red card)	Red card	Yellow card	(yellow card) (yellow-red card)	Red card	Yellow card	(yellow card) (yellow-red card)	Red card	Yellow card	(yellow card) (yellow-red card)	Red card	Yellow card	(yellow card) (yellow-red card)	Red card
2	DF	(United States) Christian Ortiz	6	0	0	1	0	0	0	0	0	0	0	0	7	0	0
3	DF	(United States) Alfredo Ortiz	1	0	0	0	0	0	0	0	0	0	0	0	1	0	0
4	DF	(Colombia) Miguel Pajaro	5	0	1	0	0	0	1	0	0	0	0	0	6	0	1
5	MF	(Benin) Maboumou Alassane	3	1	0	0	0	0	1	0	0	0	0	0	4	1	0
6	MF	(Panama) Osvaldo Lay	3	0	0	0	0	0	2	0	0	0	0	0	5	0	0
7	MF	(Haiti) Jerry Desdunes	5	0	0	0	0	0	1	1	0	0	0	0	6	1	0
9	FW	(United States) Joaquin Acuna	2	0	0	0	0	0	0	0	0	0	0	0	2	0	0
10	MF	(United States) Miguel Ibarra	4	0	0	0	0	0	0	0	0	0	0	0	4	0	0
11	FW	(France) Ilias Aoumaich	1	1	0	0	0	0	1	0	0	0	0	0	2	1	0
12	DF	(United States) Nick Relerford	6	0	1	0	0	0	0	0	0	0	0	0	6	0	1
15	DF	(Norway) Mathias Winum	1	0	0	0	0	0	0	0	0	0	0	0	1	0	0
16	DF	(United States) Erick Gonzalez	1	0	0	0	0	0	0	0	0	0	0	0	1	0	0
17	MF	(Philippines) Javier Mariona	0	0	0	0	0	0	1	0	0	0	0	0	1	0	0
18	MF	(United States) Adam Aoumaich	5	0	0	0	0	0	1	0	0	0	0	0	6	0	0
19	FW	(Jamaica) Collin Anderson	2	0	0	1	0	0	0	0	0	0	0	0	3	0	0
20	FW	(Ghana) Godwin Antwi	2	0	0	0	0	0	0	0	0	0	0	0	2	0	0
21	MF	(United States) Jimmie Villalobos	2	0	0	0	0	0	1	0	0	0	0	0	3	0	0
22	GK	(Trinidad and Tobago) Denzil Smith	4	0	0	0	0	0	0	0	0	0	0	0	4	0	0
23	MF	(United States) Renden Thomas	2	0	0	0	0	0	0	0	0	0	0	0	2	0	0
24	DF	(United States) Santiago Higareda	2	0	0	0	0	0	1	0	0	0	0	0	3	0	0
27	GK	(United States) Djibril Doumbia	0	0	0	0	0	0	0	0	0	0	0	0	0	0	0
30	GK	(United States) Marco Gonzalez	0	0	0	0	0	0	0	0	0	0	0	0	0	0	0
32	MF	(United States) Elliot Zhang	0	0	1	0	0	0	0	0	0	0	0	0	0	0	1
34	MF	(United States) Aaron Huerta	0	0	0	0	0	0	0	0	0	0	0	0	0	0	0
41	GK	(United States) Desi Nelson	0	0	0	0	0	0	0	0	0	0	0	0	0	0	0
42	DF	(United States) Juaquin Garcia Jr.	0	0	0	0	0	0	0	0	0	0	0	0	0	0	0
44	DF	(Bulgaria) Kaloyan Pehlivanov	9	0	0	0	0	0	2	0	0	0	0	0	11	0	0
45	DF	(United States) Steven Ramos	1	0	0	0	0	0	0	0	0	0	0	0	1	0	0
47	FW	(United States) Jose Lopez	0	0	0	0	0	0	0	0	0	0	0	0	0	0	0
99	MF	(United States) Cesar Bahena	3	0	0	0	0	0	1	0	0	0	0	0	4	0	0
	Coach	(United States) Brian Kleiban	7	0	0	0	0	0	1	0	0	0	0	0	8	0	0
Total			77	2	3	2	0	0	14	1	0	0	0	0	93	3	3

== Honors and awards ==
=== USL League One Annual Awards ===
==== All-League honorees ====
Player	Team	Position	Ref.
(Haiti) Jerry Desdunes	Second	FW	

=== Weekly Awards ===
==== USL League One Team of the Week ====
Week	Player	Opponent	Position	Ref
1	(Bulgaria) Kaloyan Pehlivanov	Richmond Kickers	DF	
1	(Haiti) Jerry Desdunes	Richmond Kickers	MF	
3	(United States) Jimmie Villalobos	Portland Hearts of Pine	Bench	
4	(United States) Cesar Bahena	Chattanooga Red Wolves SC	Bench	
6	(Haiti) Jerry Desdunes	Athletic Club Boise	MF	
6	(United States) Adam Aoumaich	Athletic Club Boise	Bench	
10	(Ghana) Godwin Antwi	Forward Madison FC	MF	
10	(United States) Renden Thomas	Forward Madison FC	Bench	
10	(Haiti) Jerry Desdunes	Forward Madison FC	Bench	
11/12	(United States) Erick Ceja Gonzalez	Sarasota Paradise and New York Cosmos	DF	
11/12	(United States) Adam Aoumaich	Sarasota Paradise and New York Cosmos	MF	
13	(Trinidad and Tobago) Denzil Smith	Fort Wayne FC	Bench	
14/15	(United States) Djibril Doumbia	Sarasota Paradise and Spokane Velocity	Goalkeeper	
14/15	(United States) Christian Ortiz	Sarasota Paradise and Spokane Velocity	DF	
14/15	(Haiti) Jerry Desdunes	Sarasota Paradise and Spokane Velocity	FW	
14/15	(United States) Brian Kleiban	Sarasota Paradise and Spokane Velocity	Head Coach	
16	(United States) Christian Ortiz	Greenville Triumph SC	DF	
17/18	(Trinidad and Tobago) Denzil Smith	Union Omaha and Charlotte Independence	Bench	
17/18	(United States) Adam Aoumaich	Union Omaha and Charlotte Independence	Bench	
19/20	(United States) Adam Aoumaich	One Knoxville SC	Bench	
23	(Haiti) Jerry Desdunes	Fort Wayne FC	FW	
24	(Trinidad and Tobago) Denzil Smith	New York Cosmos	GK	
32	(United States) Cesar Bahena	Greenville Triumph SC	FW	
34	(United States) Adam Aoumaich	Corpus Christi FC	Bench	

==== USL League One Player of the Week ====
Week	Player	Opponent	Position	Ref
11/12	(United States) Adam Aoumaich	Sarasota Paradise and New York Cosmos	MF	

==== USL League One Goal of the Week ====
Week	Player	Opponent	Position	Ref
10	(Ghana) Godwin Antwi	Forward Madison FC	MF	
14/15	(United States) Christian Ortiz	Sarasota Paradise	DF	
16	(United States) Cesar Bahena Jr.	Greenville Triumph SC	MF	
22	(United States) Jimmie Villalobos	Richmond Kickers	MF	
33	(United States) Adam Aoumaich	Athletic Club Boise	MF	

=== USL League One Save of the Week ===
Week	Player	Opponent	Ref
17/18	(Trinidad and Tobago) Denzil Smith	Corpus Christi FC	
22	(Trinidad and Tobago) Denzil Smith	Richmond Kickers	
32	(Trinidad and Tobago) Denzil Smith	Greenville Triumph SC	

=== Prinx Tires USL Cup Awards ===
==== Prinx Tires USL Cup Goal of the Round ====
Round	Player	Opponent	Position	Ref
3	(France) Ilias Aoumaich	Orange County SC	FW	

==== Prinx Tires USL Cup Team of the Round ====
Round	Player	Opponent	Position	Ref
4	(United States) Cesar Bahena	Phoenix Rising FC	MF	
