= Konstantinos Georgallides =

Cypriot footballer (born 2004)

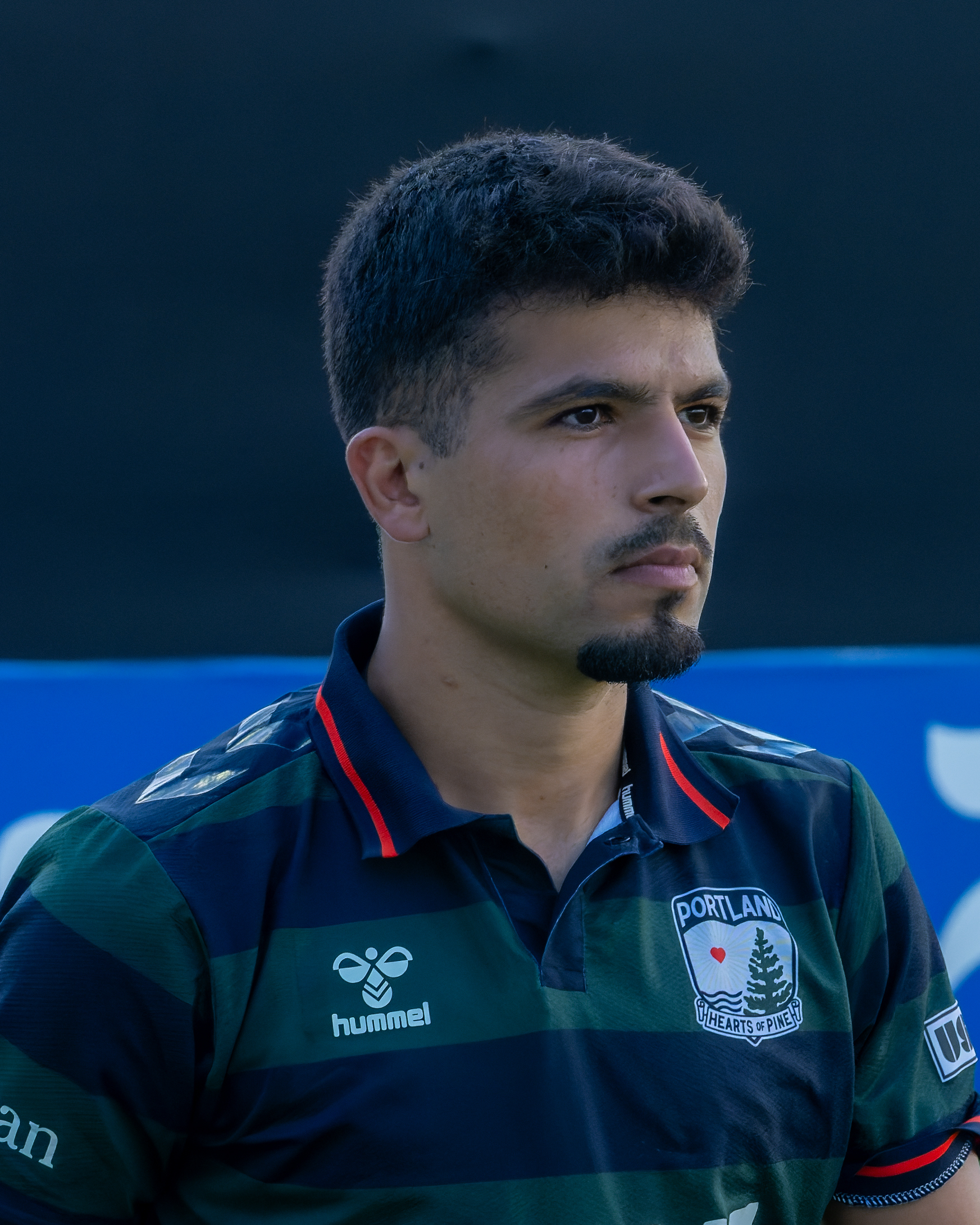
- Georgallides with Portland in 2026

Personal information
- Full name: Konstantinos Georgallides
- Date of birth: 19 January 2002 (age 24)
- Place of birth: Henderson, Kentucky, United States
- Height: 1.70 m (5 ft 7 in)
- Position: Attacking midfielder

Team information
- Current team: Portland Hearts of Pine
- Number: 21

Youth career
- 2015–2018: Anorthosis Famagusta

College career
Years	Team	Apps	(Gls)
2022–2023	Louisville Cardinals	36	(8)
2024	UNC Greensboro Spartans	15	(0)
2025	UCLA Bruins	7	(2)

Senior career*
Years	Team	Apps	(Gls)
2018–2022	Anorthosis Famagusta	3	(0)
2020–2021	ASIL Lysi	23	(0)
2024	Des Moines Menace	1	(0)
2026–	Portland Hearts of Pine	21	(3)

International career^{‡}
2018	Cyprus U17	5	(1)
2020	Cyprus U19	1	(0)
- * Club domestic league appearances and goals as of 27 July 2026 ‡ National team caps and goals as of 25 October 2026

Konstantinos Georgallides (Greek: Κωνσταντίνος Γεωργαλλίδης, born 19 January 2002) is a professional footballer who plays as an attacking midfielder for USL League One side Portland Hearts of Pine. Born in the United States and raised in Cyprus, Georgallides previously played for the Cyprus national under-17 and under-19 teams. He played professionally in Cyprus for Anorthosis Famagusta FC and ASIL Lysi before returning to the United States to pursue college soccer. He joined the Hearts of Pine in 2026.

== Early life ==
Georgallides was born in Henderson, Kentucky, and raised in his parents' native Cyprus.

== Career ==
=== Cyprus ===
Georgallides joined Cypriot First Division side Anorthosis Famagusta at age 13, and worked his way up through its academy before securing a professional contract at age 17. He made three appearances for Anorthosis' first team during the 2018–19 season, and was voted best under-17 player in the First Division at the conclusion of the season. He was sent on loan to ASIL Lysi of the Cypriot Second Division for the 2020−21 season, making 23 appearances. He returned to Anorthosis following the 2020−21 season, but made no further first team appearances and chose to pursue college soccer in the United States.

=== College and pre-professional ===
Georgallides was admitted to the University of Louisville in Louisville, Kentucky, and played there for two years for the men's soccer team, scoring eight goals in 36 appearances. Ahead of the 2024 season, he transferred to the University of North Carolina at Greensboro, making 15 appearances with the Spartans. He spent one season at UNCG before again transferring, this time to the University of California, Los Angeles. While at UCLA, Georgallides helped the Bruins secure the 2025 Big Ten men's championship with a brace in the final over the University of Michigan.

In 2024, he played one match with the pre-professional Des Moines Menace of USL League Two.

=== Portland Hearts of Pine ===
On 3 February 2026, Georgallides signed for the Portland Hearts of Pine of USL League One. He made his debut for the club as a starter in the club's first match of the 2026 season, scoring the first goal in a 3−1 victory over the New York Cosmos.

== International career ==
Eligible for both Cyprus and the United States, Georgallides made five appearances with Cyprus' U17 team in 2018 and one with the U19 team in 2020.
