= Felipe Rodríguez-Gentile =

Argentine footballer (born 2006)

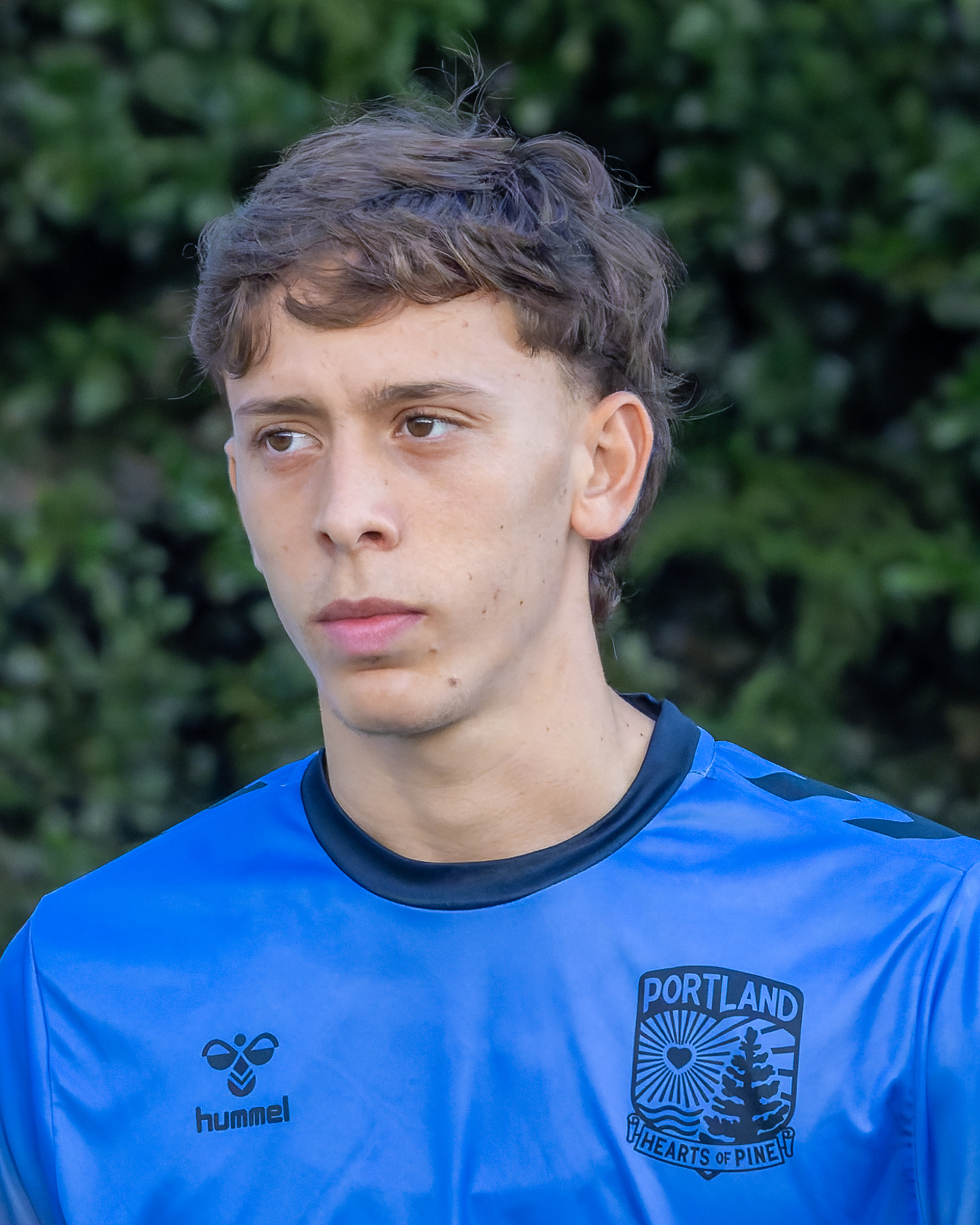
- Rodríguez-Gentile with Portland in 2026

Personal information
- Date of birth: 4 October 2006 (age 20)
- Place of birth: Vinhedo, São Paulo, Brazil
- Position: Forward

Team information
- Current team: Portland Hearts of Pine
- Number: 24

Youth career
- 2018–2019: Sant’Anna
- 2020–2021: Huyton Juniors
- 2021–2026: Preston North End

Senior career*
Years	Team	Apps	(Gls)
2026	Preston North End	0	(0)
2026	→ AFC Fylde (loan)	18	(7)
2026–	Portland Hearts of Pine	10	(2)
- * Club domestic league appearances and goals as of 11:47, 25 October 2026 (UTC)

Felipe Rodríguez-Gentile (born 4 October 2006), sometimes referred to as Felipe or Felipinho, is a professional footballer who plays as a forward for USL League One club Portland Hearts of Pine. Born in Brazil, he is a youth international for Argentina.

== Early life ==
Rodríguez-Gentile was born in Vinhedo, São Paulo to Argentine parents, Fernando and Agustina, a chemist and biologist, respectively, who left Argentina in 2002 following the Argentine great depression. His parents settled in Vinhedo, a municipality in the state of São Paulo, where Rodríguez-Gentile and his brother Mateo were born. Having also spent time living in Milan, Italy, Rodríguez-Gentile emigrated from São Paulo to Liverpool in January 2020.

== Club career ==
=== Early career ===
While attending the Merchant Taylors' Boys' School in Crosby, a friend invited him to join his Sunday league team, Huyton Juniors. Having helped Huyton Juniors retain the Merseyside and Halewood League championship title, Rodríguez-Gentile's performances earned him a trial at Premier League club Liverpool, though he was ultimately not offered a place in their academy, in part due to the COVID-19 pandemic in England.

=== Preston North End ===
==== Youth ====
He would go on to join Preston North End in 2021, with the club pre-arranging a two-year scholarship, beginning summer 2023, after recognising his potential. In Round 3 of the 2022–23 FA Youth Cup, specifically Preston's tie with Rotherham United on 9 December 2022, Rodríguez-Gentile scored five of Preston's goals in a 6–1 win. Following this performance, he began being linked with a number of Premier League sides, including Liverpool and Manchester United. Preston manager Ryan Lowe criticised the media following these links, stating that there had been no official approach from any club, and that he did not want Rodríguez-Gentile to get carried away.

Another Rodríguez-Gentile goal helped Preston progress past Gillingham in the Fourth Round of the FA Youth Cup, as they won 2–1 on 18 January 2023. He would score again as Preston beat Luton Town 3–2 in the following round on 6 February, but was unable to prevent the club from being knocked out by Southampton in the Quarter-finals. Despite his side being knocked out, Rodríguez-Gentile finished as the tournament's second top-scorer, with seven goals.

==== Senior ====
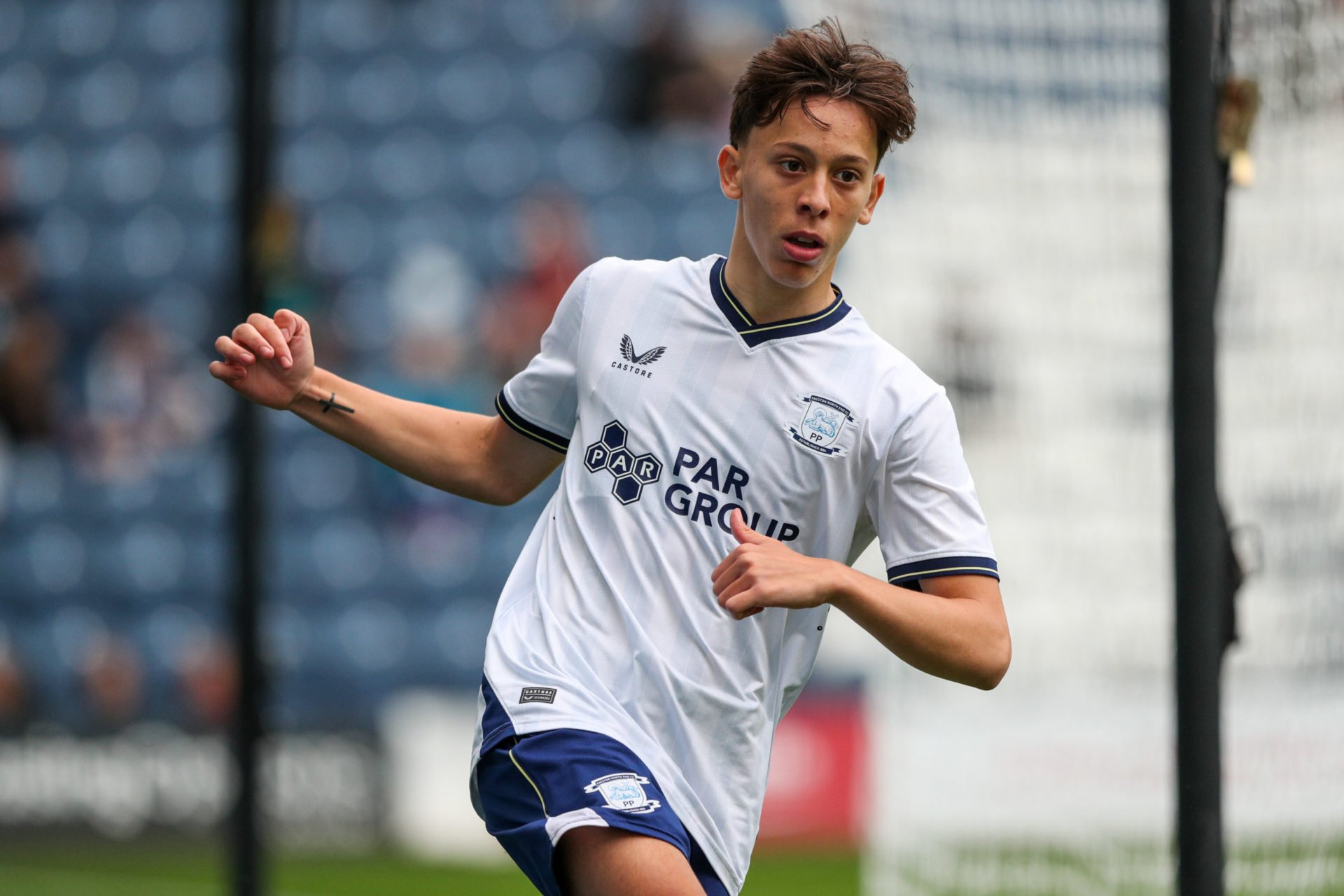
Rodríguez-Gentile with Preston North End.

The following season, having signed a scholarship deal with the club, Rodríguez-Gentile was included in the first team squad ahead of pre-season. In Preston's opening game of pre-season, a friendly game against Bamber Bridge, Rodríguez-Gentile was brought on as a second-half substitute for Mikey O'Neill, and went on to score in Preston's 7–0 win. This performance earned him a place in the squad travelling to Spain, where he would continue to impress, scoring twice more in friendlies. In a 3–0 win against Gibraltar opposition Bruno's Magpies, he calmly finished early in the second half, before scoring a consolation in a 2–1 home loss to Ipswich Town on 19 July.

Rodríguez-Gentile was included on the bench for Preston's opening game of the 2023–24 season, which they would go on to draw 1–1 away at Bristol City. He remained on the bench for the next four Championship fixtures, but due to Preston's form, winning all four matches, he found himself unable to make his debut. In early November 2023, he signed a professional contract with Preston - a deal running through summer 2026. He remained in the first-team picture for pre-season going into the 2024–25 season, though manager Ryan Lowe suggested that Rodríguez-Gentile may go out on loan to give him first-team opportunities. In December 2024, he was again linked with a move to the Premier League, with both Nottingham Forest and Tottenham Hotspur being touted as potential suitors.

==== Loan to AFC Fylde ====
On 30 January 2026, it was announced that Rodríguez-Gentile would spend the remainder of the 2025–26 season with National League North club Fylde. He made his debut the following day, as Fylde lost 1–0 at home to Southport, with Rodríguez-Gentile coming on as a second-half substitute. He would score his first goals for the club in Fylde's next game, netting a brace in the Coasters' 5–2 win against Peterborough Sports on 3 February. Goals against Curzon Ashton and Telford United followed, bringing his tally up to four goals in his first eight league appearances. He ultimately finished his time with the Coasters with seven goals in 19 appearances.

=== Portland Hearts of Pine ===
On 14 August, USL League One club Portland Hearts of Pine announced the signing of Rodríguez-Gentile. He made his first appearance two days later, coming on as a substitute in a 2–1 defeat to Forward Madison FC.

== International career ==
Rodríguez-Gentile is eligible to represent Argentina, Brazil and Spain at international level. In May 2023, he posted a photo to his Instagram story, standing in front of his television with his hand on his chest as the Argentine under-20 side stood for the national anthem ahead of their 2023 FIFA U-20 World Cup match against Nigeria. His father has stated that it is Rodríguez-Gentile's "dream" to represent Argentina.

While on holiday in Argentina, he was contacted by Argentine Football Association scout Juan Martín Tassi, who enquired with his parents about the possibility of Rodríguez-Gentile representing Argentina at youth international level. In September 2023, he was called up to the Argentina national under-17 football team for the first time by manager Diego Placente. He went on to play in two hybrid friendlies for Argentina's under-17 team against the academy teams of Boca Juniors and Barracas Central.

== Career statistics ==
=== Club ===
As of match played 17 March 2026

Appearances and goals by club, season and competition
Club	Season	League			FA Cup		EFL Cup		Other		Total	
Club	Season	Division	Apps	Goals	Apps	Goals	Apps	Goals	Apps	Goals	Apps	Goals
Preston North End	2025–26	Championship	0	0	0	0	0	0	0	0	0	0
AFC Fylde (loan)	2025–26	National League North	18	7	0	0	—		1 (Note: Appearance in FA Trophy)	0	19	7
Career total			18	7	0	0	0	0	1	0	19	7
