= Denzil Smith (footballer) =

Trinidadian footballer (born 1999)

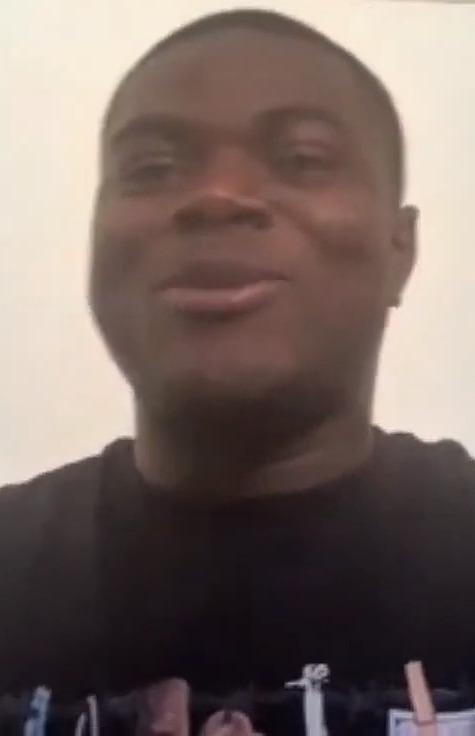
- Smith in 2025

Personal information
- Date of birth: 13 October 1999 (age 27)
- Place of birth: Siparia, Trinidad and Tobago
- Height: 1.78 m (5 ft 10 in)
- Position: Goalkeeper

Team information
- Current team: AV Alta FC
- Number: 22

Youth career
- Shiva Boys HC

Senior career*
Years	Team	Apps	(Gls)
2019–2021	W Connection		
2021–2022	Peña Raval	3	(0)
2022–2024	Club Sando		
2024–2025	AC Port of Spain		
2025–	AV Alta FC	38	(0)

International career^{‡}
2023–	Trinidad and Tobago	29	(0)
- * Club domestic league appearances and goals as of 13:02, 28 October 2026 (UTC) ‡ National team caps and goals as of 18:55, 17 November 2026 (UTC)

Denzil Smith (born 13 October 1999) is a Trinidadian football player who plays as goalkeeper for USL League One club AV Alta FC, and the Trinidad and Tobago national team.

== Career ==
Born in Siparia, Trinidad and Tobago, Smith is a youth product of Shiva Boys HC.

He began his senior career with TT Premier Football League club W Connection. During the 2021–22 season, Smith moved to Spain, briefly spending time with Athletic Club Torrellano before signing with Regional Preferente side Peña Ilicitana Raval CF in March 2022. He made three league appearances for Peña Raval during the campaign before returning to Trinidad and Tobago to play for Club Sando and AC Port of Spain.

On 10 January 2025, Smith transferred to the USL League One club AV Alta FC on a 1+1 year contract. Smith made his club debut for AV Alta FC on 15 April 2025, coming on as a late substitute prior to the penalty shootout in a third-round U.S. Open Cup match against Orange County SC, where he saved a penalty in a 4–2 shootout victory following a 2–2 draw. He made his USL League One debut four days later on 19 April 2025, starting in a 2–1 home loss to Spokane Velocity FC. Across the 2025 season, he made 11 league appearances as AV Alta finished ninth in its inaugural campaign.

After signing a contract extension in December 2025, Smith established himself as the club's primary starting goalkeeper during the 2026 season, making 27 league appearances as AV Alta finished 13th in USL League One.

== International career ==
Smith was part of the Trinidad and Tobago U20s for the 2018 CONCACAF U-20 Championship. He was first called up to the Trinidad and Tobago national team in March 2023. He made the final squad for the 2023 CONCACAF Gold Cup. He was again called up to the Trinidad and Tobago national team for the 2025 CONCACAF Gold Cup.
