= Collin Anderson =

Jamaican footballer (born 1999)

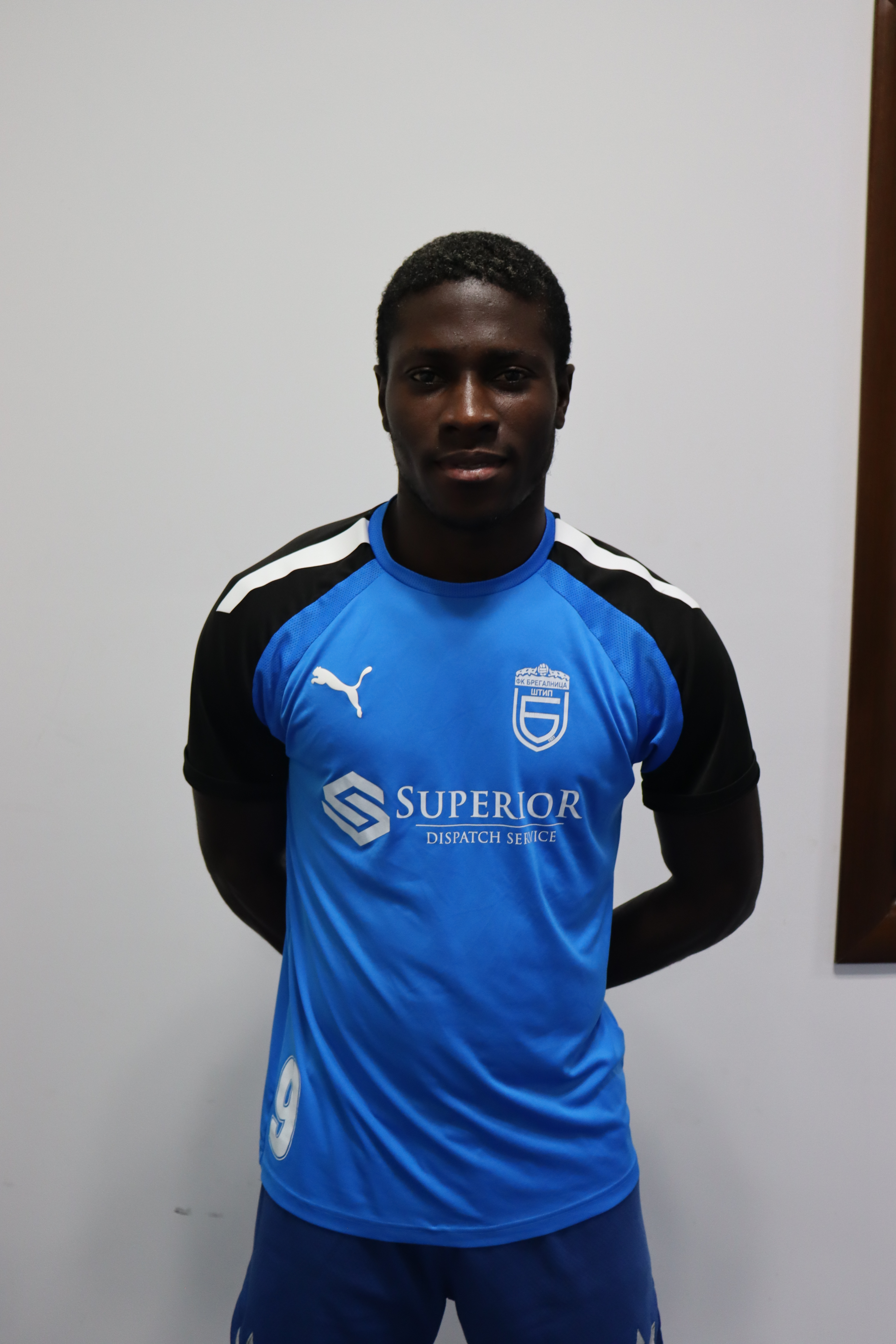

Personal information
- Full name: Collin Anthony Anderson
- Date of birth: 17 April 1999
- Place of birth: Kingston, Jamaica
- Height: 1.85 m (6 ft 1 in)
- Position: Striker

Team information
- Current team: Erbil
- Number: 9

Senior career*
Years	Team	Apps	(Gls)
2020–2023	Cavalier	66	(29)
2023–2024	Bregalnica	28	(3)
2024–2025	Erbil	6	(1)
2025	Al-Khaburah	8	(2)
2026–	AV Alta	5	(1)

International career
2023–	Jamaica	2	(0)
- * Club domestic league appearances and goals as of 9 April 2026

Collin Anthony Anderson (born April 17, 1999) is a Jamaican professional footballer who plays as a striker for AV Alta in USL League One.

== Early life ==
Anderson attended Calabar High School in Jamaica.

== Career ==
Anderson played for Jamaican side Cavalier, where he was regarded as one of the club's most important players.

=== Erbil SC ===
In August 2024, Anderson joined Iraqi Stars League Erbil SC he made his debut on September 20, starting in Erbil's 2–1 home win against Diyala. On November 6, he scored his first goal in Erbil's 4–1 win over Naft Al Basra.

== Style of play ==
Anderson mainly operates as a striker and is known for his speed.

== Personal life ==
Anderson has been nicknamed "Tracks Man".

== Honors ==
Cavalier

- Jamaica Premier League: 2021, runner-up 2022-23
- JFF Champions Cup runner-up: 2022–23

Individual

- Jamaica Premier League Golden Boot: 2022–23
