= Diego Gonzalez (soccer) =

American soccer player (born 2002)

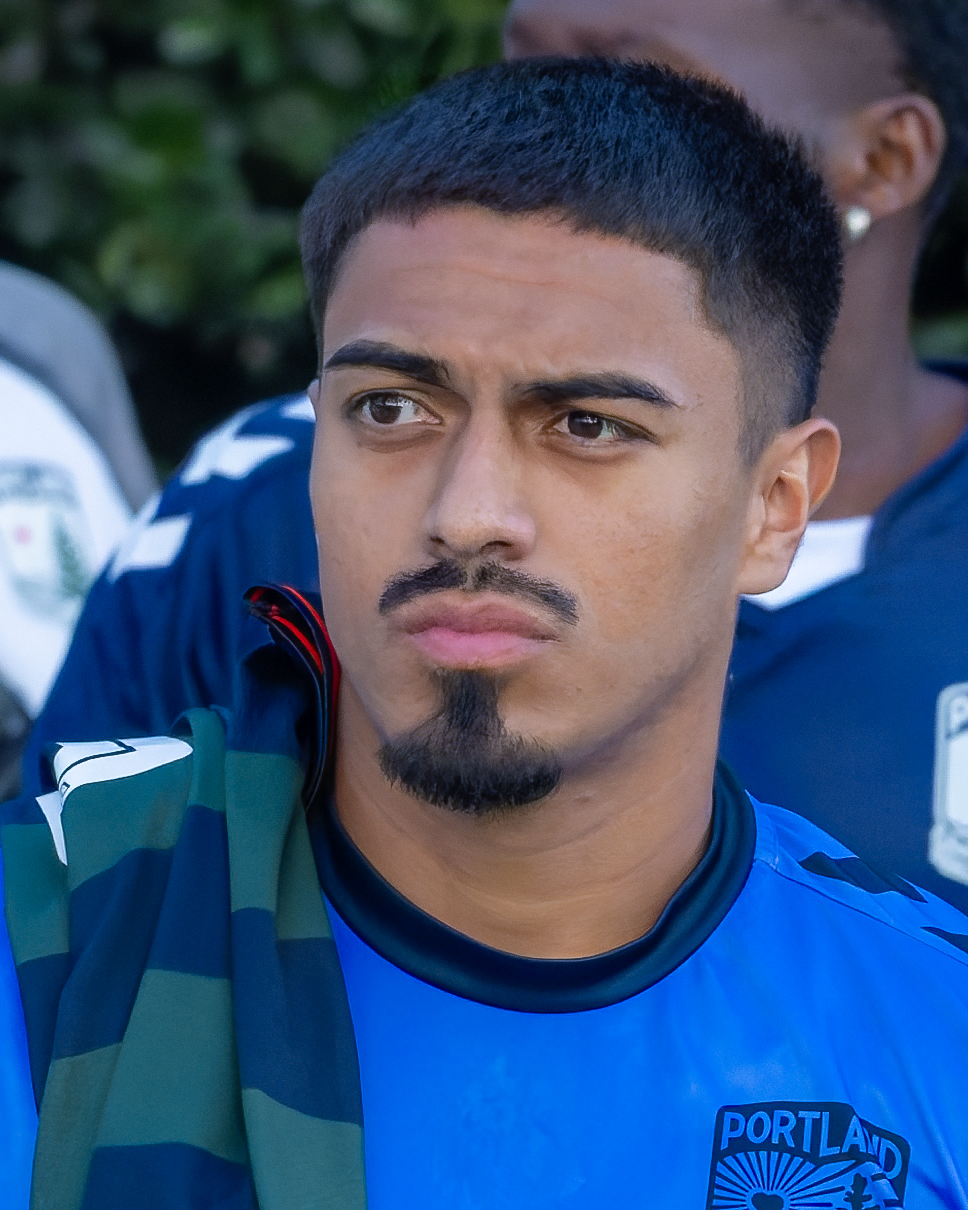
- Gonzalez with Portland in 2026

Personal information
- Date of birth: October 23, 2002 (age 24)
- Place of birth: Houston, Texas, United States
- Height: 5 ft 6 in (1.68 m)
- Position: Midfielder

Team information
- Current team: Portland Hearts of Pine (on loan from Houston Dynamo 2)
- Number: 16

Youth career
- 2014–2022: Houston Dynamo

Senior career*
Years	Team	Apps	(Gls)
2022–	Houston Dynamo	0	(0)
2022–	Houston Dynamo 2	79	(21)
2026–	→ Portland Hearts of Pine (loan)	21	(9)
- * Club domestic league appearances and goals as of October 25, 2026

Diego Gonzalez (born October 16, 2002) is an American professional soccer player who plays as a midfielder for Portland Hearts of Pine of USL League One, on loan from Houston Dynamo 2 of MLS NEXT Pro. A product of the Houston Dynamo Academy, Gonzalez has represented the club at every level of its development pathway and has earned recognition as one of the league's top young midfielders, including selection to the MLS Next Pro Best XI in 2024.

== Early life and youth career ==
Born in Houston, Texas, Gonzalez joined the Houston Dynamo Academy at the age of 12. He progressed through the club's youth system, captaining the academy's U-23 side in 2021 before signing his first professional contract with Houston Dynamo 2 ahead of the inaugural 2022 MLS NEXT Pro season.

== Club career ==
=== Houston Dynamo 2 ===
Gonzalez made his professional debut for Houston Dynamo 2 during the club's inaugural MLS NEXT Pro campaign in 2022, appearing in 19 matches and scoring two goals. He became a regular starter the following season, making 28 appearances while recording 13 goals and six assists. Houston Dynamo 2 posted a 9–1–1 record in matches in which Gonzalez scored during the 2023 season.

In February 2024, Gonzalez signed a new contract with Houston Dynamo 2 through the 2025 season. During the 2024 campaign, he established himself as one of the league's premier midfielders, finishing the regular season with six goals and ten assists while leading MLS NEXT Pro in assists and key passes. His performances earned him MLS NEXT Pro Player of the Month honors for July and selection to the 2024 MLS NEXT Pro Best XI.

In 2025, Gonzalez continued his strong form, winning MLS NEXT Pro Player of the Month for March after contributing two goals and two assists in the opening month of the season, but missed a significant amount time in the remainder of the season following a training injury.

=== Loan to Portland Hearts of Pine ===
On June 8, 2026, Gonzalez signed a loan deal with USL League One side Portland Hearts of Pine. He scored on his debut, a 2–1 loss to Chattanooga Red Wolves SC on June 13. He finished his time with the Hearts with 9 goals in 21 appearances.

== Honors ==
Individual

- MLS NEXT Pro Best XI: 2024
