= Sérigné Faye =

Senegalese footballer

Personal information
- Date of birth: 5 March 2004 (age 22)
- Place of birth: Dakar, Senegal
- Height: 1.85 m (6 ft 1 in)
- Position: Forward

Team information
- Current team: Ponferradina
- Number: 21

Youth career
- KAF

Senior career*
Years	Team	Apps	(Gls)
2022–2024	Montpellier II	18	(5)
2023–2024	Montpellier	2	(0)
2024–2025	Granada B	16	(4)
2024–2025	Granada	0	(0)
2025–2026	Rouen	30	(2)
2026–	Ponferradina	2	(1)
- * Club domestic league appearances and goals as of 4 September 2026

Sérigné Faye (born 5 March 2004) is a Senegalese professional footballer who plays as a forward for Spanish Primera Federación club Ponferradina.

== Club career ==
A youth product of the Senegalese academy KAF, Faye trialled with Montpellier in September 2022. On 12 November 2022, Faye signed with Montpellier on a 1.5 year contract. He was initially assigned to their reserves, before playing with their senior team in December 2022. He made his professional debut with Strasbourg in a 2–0 Ligue 1 win over AJ Auxerre on 29 January 2023, coming on as a late substitute.

On 6 February 2024, Faye signed for La Liga side Granada, being initially assigned to the reserves in Primera Federación. On 27 June, he renewed his contract. Faye made his debut for the senior squad of Granada on 30 October 2024 in a Copa del Rey game against Cortes.

In January 2025, Faye moved to Rouen in the French third tier.

In July 2026, Faye returned to Spain and joined Ponferradina in the third tier.
