= Jerry Desdunes =

Haitian footballer (born 2001)

Personal information
- Date of birth: 13 April 2001 (age 25)
- Place of birth: Léogâne, Haiti
- Height: 1.70 m (5 ft 7 in)
- Position: Attacking midfielder

Team information
- Current team: AV Alta FC
- Number: 7

Youth career
- Depoze FC
- Exafoot
- Kalonji SA

Senior career*
Years	Team	Apps	(Gls)
2021	Kalonji SA		
2021	Peachtree City MOBA	14	(6)
2021	San Diego 1904	18	(1)
2022	Northern Colorado Hailstorm	25	(3)
2023	Ventura County Fusion		
2025–	AV Alta FC	51	(12)
- * Club domestic league appearances and goals as of 12:59, 28 October 2026 (UTC)

Jerry Desdunes (born 13 April 2001) is a Haitian professional footballer who currently plays for AV Alta FC in the USL League One.

== Career ==
Desdunes played locally with Depoze FC and Exafoot, before moving to the United States in 2018 to join the Kalonji Soccer Academy. In 2021, Desdunes played with USL League Two club Peachtree City MOBA, where he scored six goals in 14 regular season appearances. Desdunes followed this with a spell in the NISA with San Diego 1904, making 18 appearances.

On 1 February 2022, Desdunes signed with Northern Colorado Hailstorm of the USL League One ahead of their inaugural season. He debuted for the club on 6 April 2022, starting and scoring the winning goal in extra-time in a U.S. Open Cup game against Colorado Springs Switchbacks. Following the 2022 season, Northern Colorado declined his contract option.
