= Matteo Kidd =

American soccer player (born 1998)

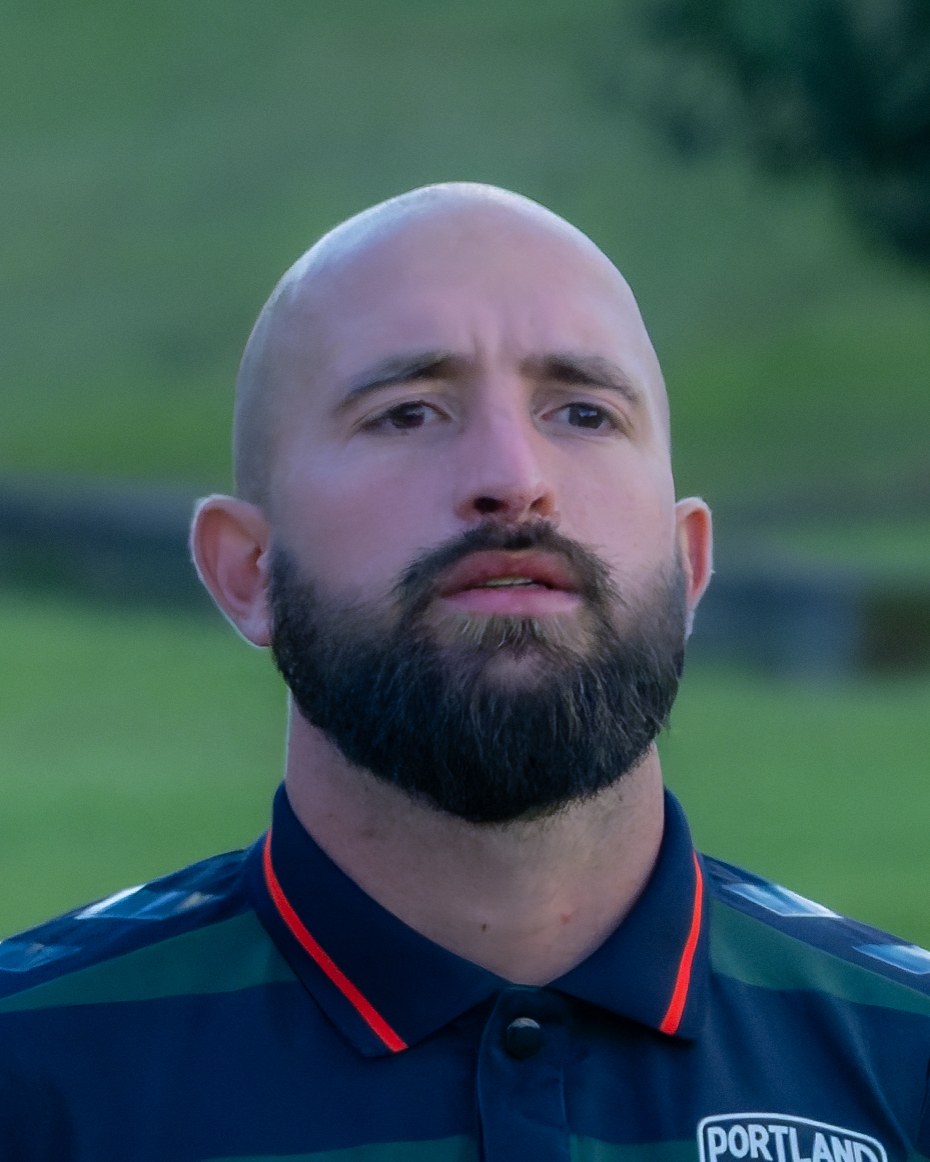
- Kidd with Portland in 2026

Personal information
- Full name: Matteo Kidd
- Date of birth: April 3, 1998 (age 28)
- Place of birth: St. Louis, Missouri, United States
- Height: 5 ft 5 in (1.65 m)
- Position: Midfielder

Team information
- Current team: Portland Hearts of Pine
- Number: 98

College career
Years	Team	Apps	(Gls)
2017–2019	Saint Louis Billikens	48	(2)

Senior career*
Years	Team	Apps	(Gls)
2021	Chicago House	18	(2)
2022–2023	Chicago Fire II	34	(1)
2024–2025	St. Louis City 2	36	(10)
2026–	Portland Hearts of Pine	31	(2)
- * Club domestic league appearances and goals as of October 25, 2026

Matteo Kidd (born April 3, 1998) is an American professional soccer player who plays as a midfielder for USL League One side Portland Hearts of Pine. Born in St. Louis, Missouri, Kidd has played in NISA, MLS Next Pro, and USL League One, including stints with Chicago Fire FC II, St. Louis City 2, and the Hearts of Pine.

== Early life ==
Kidd was born in St. Louis, Missouri, and attended Chaminade College Preparatory School in the St. Louis suburb of Creve Coeur. After a gap year, in which he trained at Saint Louis FC's academy, he attended Saint Louis University and played three seasons for their varsity soccer team, making 48 appearances and scoring two goals total. He was named Atlantic 10 All-Conference Second Team in 2019.

== Club career ==
=== Chicago House ===
Kidd began his professional career with Chicago House AC of the National Independent Soccer Association, making 18 appearances and scoring two goals for the club in the 2021 season.

=== Chicago Fire FC II ===
Following the 2021 season, Kidd moved to Chicago Fire FC II in MLS Next Pro for the league’s inaugural 2022 season. He joined C. J. Brown, who was his head coach with the House, as Brown became an assistant coach with the Fire II.

Kidd played two seasons with the Fire II, making 34 appearances and scoring one goal.

=== St. Louis City 2 ===
In 2023, Kidd joined St. Louis City 2, also in MLS Next Pro. He was signed alongside Lucas Demitra, the son of St. Louis Blues ice hockey legend Pavol Demitra. He spent two seasons with City 2, scoring 10 goals across 34 appearances, as well as five appearances in the MLS Next Pro playoffs.

=== Portland Hearts of Pine ===
Ahead of the 2026 season, Kidd signed with Portland Hearts of Pine in USL League One. He reunited with former St. Louis City 2 head coach Bobby Murphy, who is the manager of the Hearts of Pine. He scored his first goal for the Hearts of Pine in a 2–1 victory over Rhode Island FC in the USL Cup.

== Honors ==
=== Player ===
==== Saint Louis University ====
- 2019 Atlantic 10 Conference All-Conference Second Team
