= 2026 FC Naples season =

FC Naples
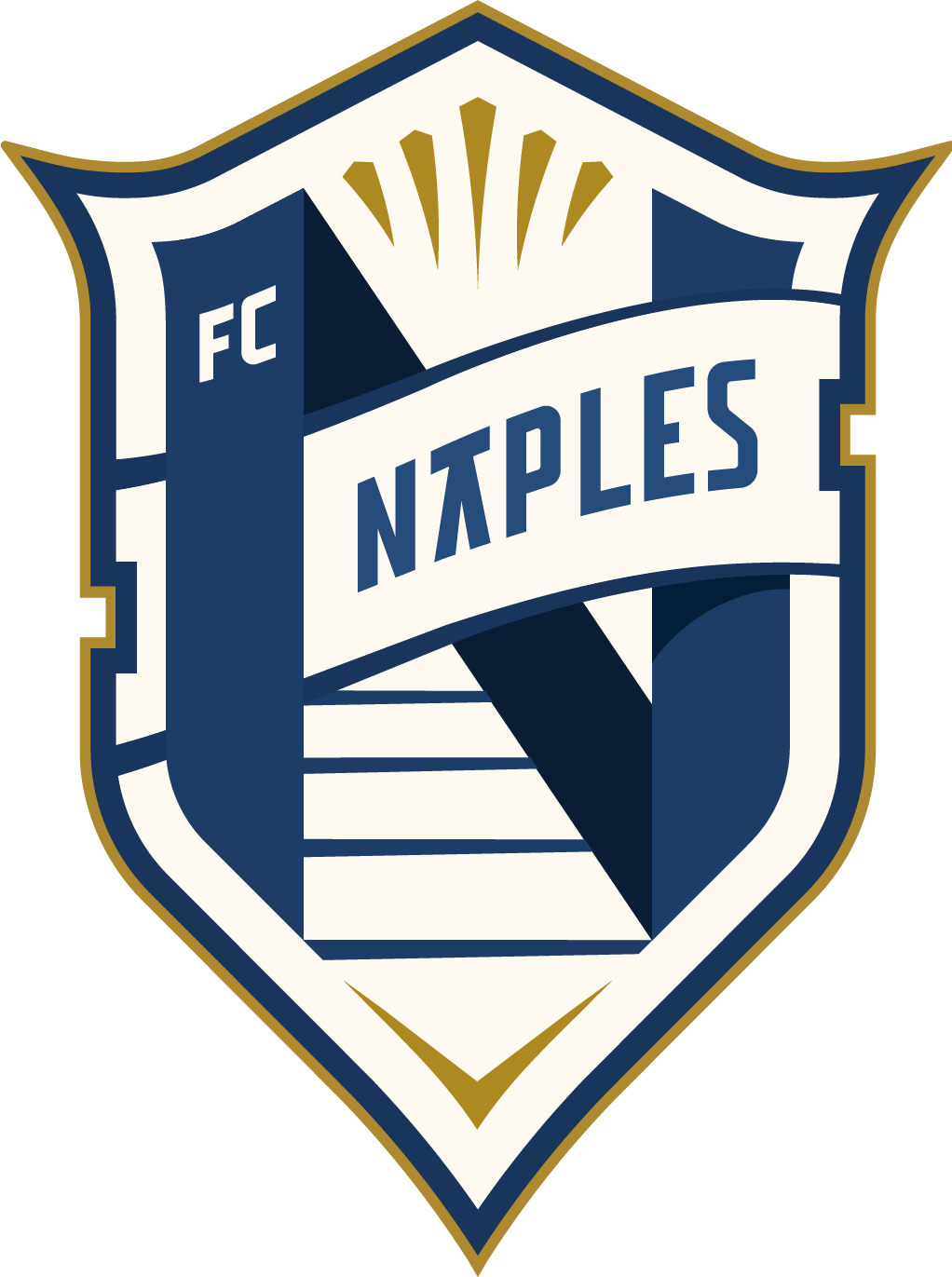
- 2026
- CEO: Roberto Moreno
- Head Coach: Matt Poland
- Stadium: Paradise Coast Sports Complex Stadium
- USL League One: 8th
- U.S. Open Cup: Round of 32
- USL Cup: Group Stage
- USL Playoffs: Quarterfinals
- Top goalscorer: League: (Colombia) Andrés Ferrín (7 Goals); All: (Colombia) Andrés Ferrín (8 Goals)
- Highest home attendance: 4,782 vs Orlando City SC US Open Cup April 15, 4,072 vs Fort Wayne FC March 7
- Lowest home attendance: 1,374 vs Richmond Kickers October 7
- Average home league attendance: 2,505, With US Open Cup 2,584, with USL Cup 2,539, With USL Cup but not US Open Cup 2,460
- Biggest win: FC Naples 3–0 Red Force March 18 31 US Open Cup; FC Naples 3–0 FC America CFL Spurs March 31 US Open Cup
- Biggest defeat: FC Naples 1–5 Charlotte Independence June 3

The 2026 FC Naples season was the second season in the club's existence as well as their second in USL League One, the third-tier of American soccer.

== Current roster ==
As of August 5, 2026

Note: Flags indicate national team as defined under FIFA eligibility rules; some limited exceptions apply. Players may hold more than one non-FIFA nationality.

| No. | Pos. | Nation | Player |
|---|---|---|---|
| 1 | GK | USA | Lalo Delgado |
| 2 | DF | USA | Jaden Strumeier |
| 3 | DF | USA | Julian Cisneros |
| 4 | DF | USA | Hal Uderitz |
| 5 | DF | ITA | Luca Mastrantonio |
| 6 | DF | SEN | Omar Ciss |
| 7 | FW | USA | Taylor Gray |
| 8 | MF | USA | Juan Osorio |
| 9 | FW | USA | Gio Miglietti |
| 10 | MF | COL | Andrés Ferrín |
| 11 | MF | USA | Christopher Garcia |
| 14 | DF | IRL | Kevin O'Connor |

| No. | Pos. | Nation | Player |
|---|---|---|---|
| 17 | GK | USA | Tony Halterman |
| 19 | MF | COL | William Arevalo |
| 20 | DF | TTO | Jaylen Yearwood |
| 21 | MF | ESP | Marc Torrellas |
| 22 | DF | USA | Joshua Yoder |
| 23 | DF | ENG | Aiden Mesias |
| — | DF | ENG | Max Broughton |
| 30 | MF | USA | Ian Cerro |
| 34 | GK | IRL | Luca Cy Fitzgerald |
| 42 | FW | FRA | Nicolas Likulia |
| 66 | MF | LBR | Aryeh Miller |
| 99 | GK | JAM | Joshua Grant |

1. USL Academy Contract

== Transfers ==
=== In ===
| Date | Position | Number | Name | from | Type | Fee | Ref. |
|---|---|---|---|---|---|---|---|
| December 10, 2025 | FW | 9 | (United States) Gio Miglietti | (United States) Huntsville City FC | Signing | NA | |
| December 22, 2025 | FW | 7 | (United States) Taylor Gray | (United States) South Georgia Tormenta FC | Signing | NA | |
| December 26, 2025 | MF | 23 | (England) Aiden Mesias | (United States) Forward Madison FC | Signing | NA | |
| December 29, 2025 | DF | | (England) Max Broughton | (United States) Pittsburgh Riverhounds SC | Signing | NA | |
| December 31, 2025 | DF | 5 | (Italy) Luca Mastrantonio | (United States) AV Alta FC | Signing | NA | |
| January 15, 2026 | GK | 99 | (Jamaica) Joshua Grant | (United States) New York Red Bulls II | Signing | NA | |
| January 20, 2026 | MF | 11 | (United States) Christopher Garcia | (United States) Forward Madison FC | Signing | NA | |
| January 21, 2026 | MF | 8 | (United States) Juan Osorio | (United States) San Antonio FC | Signing | NA | |
| February 2, 2026 | MF | 19 | (Colombia) William Arevalo | (Colombia) Maracaneiros | Signing | NA | |
| March 3, 2026 | DF | 22 | (United States) Joshua Yoder | (United States) Longwood Lancers | Signing | NA | |
| March 3, 2026 | DF | 2 | (United States) Jaden Strumeier | (United States) UNC Wilmington Seahawks | Signing | NA | |
| March 5, 2026 | DF | 31 | (United States) Tristen Rose | (United States) Maryland Terrapins | Signing | NA | |
| April 10, 2026 | MF | 77 | (Liberia) Aryeh Miller | (United States) Carolina Core FC | 25 day Contract | NA | |
| June 5, 2026 | DF | 20 | (Trinidad and Tobago) Jaylen Yearwood | (United States) Orlando City B | Transfer | NA | |
| July 3, 2026 | MF | 6 | (Senegal) Omar Ciss | (United States) Charlotte Independence | Signing | NA | |
| August 1, 2026 | DF | 4 | (United States) Hal Uderitz | (United States) Sporting Kansas City II | 25 Day Contract | NA | |
| August 5, 2026 | FW | 42 | (France) Nicolas Likulia | (United States) Virginia Dream FC | 25 Day Contract | NA | |
| August 25, 2026 | MF | | (United States) Ty Collins | (United States) Lely High School | Academy Contract | NA | |

=== Out ===
| Date | Position | Number | Name | to | Type | Fee | Ref. |
|---|---|---|---|---|---|---|---|
| July 14, 2025 | FW | 11 | (United States) Justin Weiss | NA | Retirement | NA | |
| December 1, 2025 | MF | 19 | (United States) Thomas Bowe | Unattached | Academy Contract Expired | NA | |
| December 1, 2025 | MF | 24 | (United States) Roscoe Rubinstein | Unattached | Academy Contract Expired | NA | |
| December 1, 2025 | GK | 34 | (Republic of Ireland) Luca Cy Fitzgerald | Unattached | Academy Contract Expired | NA | |
| December 1, 2025 | FW | 9 | (United States) Karsen Henderlong | (United States) Tampa Bay Rowdies | Transfer | NA | |
| December 3, 2025 | DF | 2 | (United States) Brecc Evans | (United States) Portland Hearts of Pine | Free Agent | NA | |
| December 5, 2025 | DF | 30 | (United States) Jake Dengler | (United States) Athletic Club Boise | Contract expiration | NA | |
| December 5, 2025 | DF | 6 | (United States) Gustavo Fernandes | (United States) South Georgia Tormenta FC | Contract expiration | NA | |
| December 5, 2025 | DF | 12 | (United States) Ian Garrett | Unattached | Contract expiration | NA | |
| December 5, 2025 | MF | 10 | (Uganda) Jayden Onen | Unattached | Contract expiration | NA | |
| December 5, 2025 | FW | 7 | (Scotland) Tyler Pasnik | Unattached | Contract expiration | NA | |
| December 5, 2025 | MF | 22 | (United States) Luka Prpa | Unattached | Contract expiration | NA | |
| December 5, 2025 | DF | 5 | (Argentina) Tomás Ritondale | (United States) Corpus Christi FC | Contract expiration | NA | |
| December 5, 2025 | GK | 18 | (Puerto Rico) Joel Serrano | (Puerto Rico) Academia Quintana | Contract expiration | NA | |
| December 5, 2025 | DF | 32 | (Puerto Rico) Rodolfo Sulia | (Puerto Rico) Academia Quintana | Contract expiration | NA | |
| December 5, 2025 | MF | 8 | (Australia) Chris Heckenberg | Retired | Retirement | NA | |
| May 8, 2026 | DF | 4 | (Nicaragua) Max Glasser | Retired | Retirement | NA | |
| August 19, 2026 | FW | 18 | (United States) Dominick Bachstein | (United States) Corpus Christi FC | Loan | Free | |

== Competitive fixtures ==
=== Regular season ===
| March 7 1 | FC Naples | 2–0 | Fort Wayne FC | Naples, Florida |
| 7:00 PM EDT | Torrellas (yellow card) 21'; Garcia 45'; Bachstein 88' | Report | Hernandez (yellow card) 32'; Jordan (yellow card) 42' | Stadium: Paradise Coast Sports Complex; Attendance: 4,072; Referee: Edson Carvajal |

| March 14 2 | FC Naples | 2–2 | Corpus Christi FC | Naples, Florida |
| 7:00 PM EDT | Torrellas 2'; Cisneros (yellow card) 37'; Bachstein 88' (yellow card) 90' | Report | Kwakwa (yellow card) 20'; Pondeca 43'; Abeal (yellow card) 56'; Langlois (yellow card) 78'; Keaney (yellow card) 86'; Medina 90+2' | Stadium: Paradise Coast Sports Complex; Attendance: 3,665; Referee: Alejo Calume |

| March 21 3 | Richmond Kickers | 0–1 | FC Naples | Richmond, Virginia |
| 6:00 PM EDT | Richman (red card) 43'; Kirkland (yellow card) 45'; Barnathan (yellow card) 45+6'; O'Malley (yellow card) 52'; Amer (yellow card) 63'; Layton (yellow card) 88'; Sawatzky (yellow card) 88' | Report | O'Connor 24'; Mastrantonio (yellow card) 74' | Stadium: City Stadium; Attendance: 5,494; Referee: Joe Surgan |

| March 28 4 | FC Naples | 0–1 | Forward Madison FC | Naples, Florida |
| 7:00 PM EDT | Cerro (yellow card) 51' | Report | Gyamfi 20'; Torres (yellow card) 31'; Munjoma (yellow card) 86'; Harms (yellow card) 90+4' | Stadium: Paradise Coast Sports Complex; Attendance: 3,147; Referee: Amin Hadzic |

| April 5 5 | FC Naples | 1–0 | Greenville Triumph SC | Naples, Florida |
| 7:00 PM EDT | Strumier (yellow card) 5'; Ferrín 18'; Poland (yellow card) 61'; Gay (yellow card) 72'; Miglietti (yellow card) 81'; Delgado (yellow card) 89' | Report | Beckford (yellow card) 41' | Stadium: Paradise Coast Sports Complex; Attendance: 2,749; Referee: Richonne Clark |

| April 11 6 | FC Naples | 2–0 | Sarasota Paradise | Naples, Florida |
| 7:00 PM EDT | Bachstein (yellow card) 36'; Garcia 68', 90+7'; Torrellas (yellow card) 69'; Miglietti (yellow card) 80' | Report | Walker (yellow card) 33'; Rodriguez (yellow card) 89'; Bolanos (yellow card) 90+2'; Karani (yellow card) 90+4' | Stadium: Paradise Coast Sports Complex; Attendance: 2,864; Referee: Alexandra Billeter |

| April 19 7 | Portland Hearts of Pine | 1–1 | FC Naples | Portland, Maine |
| 3:43 PM EDT | Wright 36'; Barbosa (yellow card) 44'; Washington (yellow card) 63'; Kamara (yellow card) 74'; Kidd (yellow card) 85' | Report | Rose (yellow card) 77'; Glasser 87' | Stadium: Fitzpatrick Stadium; Attendance: 6,033; Referee: Gerald Flores |

| May 2 8 | FC Naples | 0–3 | One Knoxville SC | Naples, Florida |
| 7:00 PM EDT | Torrellas (yellow card) 23' | Report | Krioutchenkov 21', 51'; Fernandez (yellow card) 45+4'; Zarokostas (yellow card) 58'; Rodrigues (yellow card) 67'; Diene 83' | Stadium: Paradise Coast Sports Complex; Attendance: 3,076; Referee: Matthew Thompson |

| May 10 9 | Spokane Velocity | 2–1 | FC Naples | Spokane, Washington |
| 6:00 PM EDT | Alexandre 8'; John-Brown (yellow card) 28'; Lewis (yellow card) 36'; Peláez 54' (pen.) | Report | Mastrantonio 90+5' | Stadium: One Spokane Stadium; Attendance: 1,948; Referee: Muhammad Kaleia |

| May 13 10 | Athletic Club Boise | 2–0 | FC Naples | Garden City, Idaho |
| 9:00 PM EDT | Amang 8'; Ricketts (yellow card) 62'; Yehya (yellow card) 69'; Gasso (yellow card) 75'; Rose 81' (o.g.); Crull (yellow card) 87' | Report | O'Connor (yellow card) 11'; Ferrín (yellow card) 33'; Torrellas (yellow card) 50'; Cisneros (yellow card) 71' | Stadium: Stadium at Expo Idaho; Attendance: 7,203; Referee: Deny Kulasinac |

| May 23 11 | FC Naples | 1–0 | Westchester SC | Naples, Florida |
| 7:30 PM EDT | Torrellas (yellow card) 33'; Arevalo 45'; Yoder (yellow card) 47' | Report | Blommestijn (yellow card) 52'; Marinelli (yellow card) 66'; Bachstein (yellow card) 66'; Powder (yellow card) 77'; Jiménez (yellow card) 81' | Stadium: Paradise Coast Sports Complex; Attendance: 2,029; Referee: Benjamin Meyer |

| May 30 12 | Union Omaha | 2–1 | FC Naples | Omaha, Nebraska |
| 8:00 PM EDT | Boudadi (yellow card) 48'; Gutierrez 68'; Jiba 75' | Report | Arevalo 23'; Gray (yellow card) 59'; Ferrín (yellow card) 63'; Gay (yellow card) 72' | Stadium: Morrison Stadium; Attendance: 2,196; Referee: Esad Omanovic |

| June 3 13 | FC Naples | 1–5 | Charlotte Independence | Naples, Florida |
| 7:30 PM EDT | Cisneros (yellow card) 14'; Gay 79' (yellow card) 85' | Report | Saydee 13'; Manin (yellow card) 20'; Marou 31'; Álvarez 39', 49'; Bakero 71'; Romero (yellow card) 79' | Stadium: Paradise Coast Sports Complex; Attendance: 1,474; Referee: Igor Bych |

| June 13 14 | Charlotte Independence | 4–3 | FC Naples | Charlotte, North Carolina |
| 7:00 PM EDT | Álvarez 6', 82' (yellow card) 72'; Marou 59'; Manin (yellow card) 65'; Ortiz 86'; Fuchs (yellow card) 90+3' | Report | Torrellas (yellow card) 9'; Arevalo 21'; Mastrantonio 68'; Miglietti 89' | Stadium: American Legion Memorial Stadium; Attendance: 878; Referee: Joe Surgan |

| June 20 15 | Chattanooga Red Wolves SC | 1–0 | FC Naples | East Ridge, Tennessee |
| 7:00 PM EDT | Hernandez 78' (pen.) | Report | Arevalo (yellow card) 18'; Poland (yellow card) 83'; Miglietti (yellow card) 83'; Gay (yellow card) 89' | Stadium: CHI Memorial Stadium; Attendance: 1,643; Referee: Mark Verso |

| July 3 16 | FC Naples | 2–3 | Portland Hearts of Pine | Naples, Florida |
| 7:30 PM EDT | Garcia 45'; Ferrín (yellow card) 73' | Report | Drack (yellow card) 12'; Faye 48'; Gonzalez 88'; Lopez 90+1' | Stadium: Paradise Coast Sports Complex; Attendance: 2,057; Referee: Rubiel Vazquez |

| July 8 17 | New York Cosmos | 1–0 | FC Naples | Paterson, New Jersey |
| 7:00 PM EDT | Marsh 56'; Guenzatti (yellow card) 69'; Chavez (yellow card) 90+3' | Report | Yearwood (yellow card) 10'; Osorio (yellow card) 82' | Stadium: Hinchliffe Stadium; Attendance: 1,505; Referee: Benjamin Meyer |

| July 18 18 | FC Naples | v | South Georgia Tormenta FC | Naples, Florida |
| | | | | Stadium: Paradise Coast Sports Complex |
Note: Game cancelled following South Georgia Tormenta FC's withdrawal from USL League One.

| July 25 19 | Forward Madison FC | 3–1 | FC Naples | Madison, Wisconsin |
| 7:00 PM EDT | Karamoko 28'; Toure (yellow card) 42'; Edwards (yellow card) 70'; Bolma 74'; Torres (yellow card) 79'; Carmichael 90+4' | Report | Mesias 80' (pen.) | Stadium: Breese Stevens Field; Attendance: 3,956; Referee: Calin Radosav |

| August 1 20 | Sarasota Paradise | P–P | FC Naples | Lakewood Ranch, Florida |
| 7:30 PM EDT | | | | Stadium: Premier Sports Campus |

| August 5 21 | FC Naples | 2–1 | AV Alta FC | Naples, Florida |
| 7:30 PM EDT | Miglietti 45+3' (yellow card) 47'; Gray (yellow card) 50'; Cisneros (yellow card) 74'; Garcia (yellow card) 80'; Ferrín 90' | Report | Pehlivanov (yellow card) 68'; C. Ortiz (yellow card) 69'; Desdunes 73' (pen.); A. Ortiz (yellow card) 83'; Acuña (yellow card) 90+3' | Stadium: Paradise Coast Sports Complex; Attendance: 2,017; Referee: Deny Kulasinac |

| August 15 22 | Westchester SC | 3–2 | FC Naples | Mount Vernon, New York |
| 7:00 PM EDT | Elias (yellow card) 10' (goal) 37'; McGlynn 29'; Jiménez 35' (yellow card) 83'; Guezen (yellow card) 71' | Report | Ferrín 48' (pen.); Ciss (yellow card) 72'; Likulia 78' | Stadium: The Stadium at Memorial Field; Attendance: 1,860; Referee: Edson Carvajal |

| August 22 23 | AV Alta FC | 1–2 | FC Naples | Lancaster, California |
| 11:00 PM EDT | Acuña 45'; Relerford (red card) 45+2'; Alassane (yellow card) 90+4' | Report | Mesias (yellow card) 31'; Ferrín 65'; Osorio (yellow card) 88'; Likulia 90+5' (yellow card) 90+6' | Stadium: Lancaster Municipal Stadium; Attendance: 4,522; Referee: Abdu-Razzaq Juma |

| August 26 24 | FC Naples | 2–0 | Union Omaha | Naples, Florida |
| 7:30 PM EDT | Ciss (yellow card) 3'; Mastrantonio (yellow card) 30'; Likulia 40'; Ferrín 75' | Report | Ors (yellow card) 51' | Stadium: Paradise Coast Sports Complex; Attendance: 1,589; Referee: Muhammad Kaleia |

| August 29 25 | Greenville Triumph SC | 4–0 | FC Naples | Mauldin, South Carolina |
| 7:00 PM EDT | Boyce 24'; Liadi (yellow card) 41' (goal) 88'; Nour 53', 87'; Evans (yellow card) 83' | Report | Cisneros (yellow card) 72'; Gordon (yellow card) 90+5' | Stadium: GE Vernova Park; Attendance: 3,628; Referee: Izlen Peksenar |

| September 6 26 | FC Naples | 0–2 | Athletic Club Boise | Naples, Florida |
| 7:30 PM EDT | Garcia (yellow card) 36' (yellow-red card) 68'; Gordon (yellow card) 65' | Report | Moon 16'; Kostyshyn 51'; Mayaka (yellow card) 57'; Gasso (yellow card) 63'; Dengler (yellow card) 86' | Stadium: Paradise Coast Sports Complex; Attendance: 1,831; Referee: Erick Lezama |

| September 11 27 | One Knoxville SC | 0–0 | FC Naples | Knoxville, Tennessee |
| 8:30 PM EDT | McRobb (yellow card) 85' | Report | Uderitz (yellow card) 49'; Gay (yellow card) 88'; Ferrín (yellow card) 90+4' | Stadium: Covenant Health Park; Attendance: 4,023; Referee: Stephen Foster |

| September 19 28 | Fort Wayne FC | 2–2 | FC Naples | Fort Wayne, Indiana |
| 7:30 PM EDT | Armas (yellow card) 65'; Thomas (yellow card) 67'; Dias 83'; Becher 90+2' | Report | Cisneros 11' (yellow card) 25'; Garcia 17'; Likulia (yellow card) 45+3'; Mastrantonio (yellow card) 54'; Delgado (yellow card) 79'; Yoder (yellow card) 90+6'; Gray (yellow card) 90+7' | Stadium: Fort Wayne FC Park; Attendance: 3,462; Referee: Anthony Sobolevsky |

| September 26 29 | FC Naples | 1–0 | Chattanooga Red Wolves SC | Naples, Florida |
| 7:00 PM EDT | Yearwood (yellow card) 12'; Miglietti 43' (pen.); Cisneros (yellow card) 49'; Uderitz (yellow card) 72'; Osorio (yellow card) 83'; Delgado (yellow card) 90+7' | Report | Kelly (yellow card) 41'; Adewole (yellow card) 41'; Lombardi (yellow card) 68'; Mensah (yellow card) 81'; Vaughan (yellow card) 90+9' | Stadium: Paradise Coast Sports Complex; Attendance: 1,856; Referee: Laith Dahhan |

| October 3 30 | FC Naples | 2–1 | New York Cosmos | Naples, Florida |
| 7:00 PM EDT | Torrellas 21'; Ciss 69'; Likulia (yellow card) 90+4' | Report | Spengler (yellow card) 24'; Jawneh 49'; Ramos (yellow card) 65' | Stadium: Paradise Coast Sports Complex; Attendance: 3,057; Referee: Deny Kulasinac |

| October 7 31 | FC Naples | 2–0 | Richmond Kickers | Naples, Florida |
| 7:00 PM EDT | Miglietti 23', 67'; Uderitz (yellow card) 34'; Ciss (yellow card) 56'; Gordon (yellow card) 90+3' | Report | Pannholzer (yellow card) 63' | Stadium: Paradise Coast Sports Complex; Attendance: 1,374; Referee: Jeremy Scheer |

| October 10 32 | Corpus Christi FC | 0–1 | FC Naples | Corpus Christi, Texas |
| 8:30 PM EDT | Bowen (yellow card) 66'; Roscoe (yellow card) 85' | Report | Collins 24'; Garcia (yellow card) 33'; Ferrín (yellow card) 90+3' | Stadium: Cabaniss Athletic Complex; Attendance: 2,830; Referee: Ivan de Cristofaro |

| October 16 33 | South Georgia Tormenta FC | v | FC Naples | Statesboro, Georgia |
| | | | | Stadium: Tormenta Stadium |
Note: Game cancelled following South Georgia Tormenta FC's withdrawal from USL League One.

| October 21 20 | Sarasota Paradise | 2–3 | FC Naples | Lakewood Ranch, Florida |
| 6:30 PM EDT | Røed 35'; Linderoth (yellow card) 57'; Watters (yellow card) 87'; Bolanos 90+1'; Walker (red card) 90+4' | Report | Collins 39'; O'Connor 61'; Mastrantonio (yellow card) 73'; Ciss (yellow card) 78'; Miglietti (yellow card) 90+2'; Uderitz (yellow card) 90+3' (goal) 90+6' | Stadium: Premier Sports Campus; Attendance: 2,394; Referee: Jorge Escobar |
Note: match was originally going to be played on August 1 but was postponed due to bad weather.

| October 24 34 | FC Naples | 1–0 | Spokane Velocity | Naples, Florida |
| 7:00 PM EDT | Mastrantonio (yellow card) 7'; Cisneros (yellow card) 41'; Osorio (yellow card) 81'; Ferrín 90+4' | Report | Alexandre (yellow card) 31'; Opara (yellow card) 39'; Miller (yellow card) 84' | Stadium: Paradise Coast Sports Complex; Attendance: 3,217; Referee: Benjamin Meyer |

=== Playoffs ===
| November 1 Quarterfinals | Charlotte Independence | 5–1 | FC Naples | Charlotte, North Carolina |
| 7:00 PM EDT | Fuchs (yellow card) 6'; Uderitz 10' (o.g.); Bakero (yellow card) 20'; Saydee 45+1'; Jaime 59'; Coulibaly (yellow card) 73'; Pinho 79', 84' | Report | Osorio (yellow card) 45+4'; Mastrantonio 88' | Stadium: American Legion Memorial Stadium; Attendance: 2,200; Referee: Carlos Rodriguez |

=== Lamar Hunt US Open Cup ===
| March 18 First Round | FC Naples | 3–0 | Red Force | Naples, Florida |
| 7:00 PM ET | Torrellas 23'; Gay 30' (yellow card) 76'; Gray 90+2' | | Quintero (yellow card) 65'; Calcagno (yellow card) 79'; Mion (yellow card) 89' | Stadium: Paradise Coast Sports Complex; Attendance: 2,283; Referee: Jorge Escobar |

| March 31 Second Round | FC Naples | 3–0 | FC America CFL Spurs | Naples, Florida |
| 7:00 PM ET | Ferrín 3' (pen.); Garcia (yellow card) 44'; Mesias (yellow card) 53'; Cisneros (yellow card) 56' (goal) 60'; Bachstein 90+2' | Report | Ortiz (yellow card) 2'; Espindola (red card) 44'; Fernandes (yellow card) 52' | Stadium: Paradise Coast Sports Complex; Attendance: 1,964; Referee: Edson Carvajal |

| April 15 Round of 32 | FC Naples | 0–1 | Orlando City SC | Naples, Florida |
| 7:00 PM ET | Garcia (yellow card) 71' | Report | Spicer 18'; Brekalo (yellow card) 40'; Ellis (yellow card) 90+7'; Guske (yellow card) 90+8' | Stadium: Paradise Coast Sports Complex; Attendance: 4,782; Referee: Elvis Osmanovic |

=== USL Cup ===
| April 29 Group Stage | Miami FC | 4–1 | FC Naples | Miami, Florida |
| 7:00 PM ET | Rocha 8'; Tunbridge 12'; Ndiaye 17' (yellow card) 51'; Knutson (yellow card) 25'; Locadia 55' (red card) 56'; Ndongo (yellow card) 87' | Report | Bachstein 30'; Gay (red card) 56' | Stadium: Pitbull Stadium; Attendance: 821; Referee: Elvis Osmanovic |
Note: Game cancelled following South Georgia Tormenta FC's withdrawal from USL League One then rescheduled with Miami FC.

| May 17 Group Stage | FC Naples | 1–1 (3–1 p) | Sporting JAX | Naples, Florida |
| 5:18 PM EDT | Cisneros 90+3' | Report | Al Qaq 17'; Kuzain (yellow card) 64'; Edwards (yellow card) 89' | Stadium: Paradise Coast Sports Complex; Attendance: 2,071; Referee: Mario Maric |
| | Penalties |
| | Ferrín (penalty scored); Mesias (penalty scored); O'Connor (penalty scored); Osorio (penalty missed) | | (penalty missed) Jääskeläinen; (penalty missed) Edwards; (penalty scored) Neville; (penalty missed) Sadlier |

| June 6 Group Stage | FC Naples | 0–2 | Sarasota Paradise | Naples, Florida |
| 7:30 PM EDT | Osorio (yellow card) 40'; Yoder (yellow card) 60'; Cisneros (yellow card) 77'; Bulai-Tudor (yellow card) 90+4' | Report | Watters 11'; Bäckstrand (yellow card) 43'; Kend (yellow card) 48'; O'Dwyer 84'; Krueger (yellow card) 85' | Stadium: Paradise Coast Sports Complex; Attendance: 2,139; Referee: Lauren Aldrich |

| July 11 Group Stage | Tampa Bay Rowdies | 2–0 | FC Naples | St. Petersburg, Florida |
| 7:30 PM EDT | Henderlong 41'; Conway 44'; Dolabella (yellow card) 45+6'; Dossantos (yellow card) 56'; Perez (yellow card) 87' | Report | Ciss (yellow card) 45+2'; Ferrín (yellow card) 81'; Rose (yellow card) 85' | Stadium: Al Lang Stadium; Attendance: 4,928; Referee: Jorge Escobar |

=== Appearances and goals ===
| No. | Pos | Nat | Player | Total | | USL League One | | Lamar Hunt US Open Cup | | USL Cup | | USL League One Playoffs | |
| No. | Pos | Nat | Player | Apps | Goals | Apps | Goals | Apps | Goals | Apps | Goals | Apps | Goals |
|---|---|---|---|---|---|---|---|---|---|---|---|---|---|
| 1 | GK | (United States) USA | Lalo Delgado | 34 | 0 | 28+0 | 0 | 3+0 | 0 | 2+0 | 0 | 1+0 | 0 |
| 2 | DF | (United States) USA | Jaden Strumeier | 9 | 0 | 3+3 | 0 | 0+1 | 0 | 1+1 | 0 | 0+0 | 0 |
| 3 | DF | (United States) USA | Julian Cisneros | 40 | 3 | 31+1 | 1 | 3+0 | 1 | 4+0 | 1 | 1+0 | 0 |
| 4 | DF | (Nicaragua) NCA | Max Glasser | 10 | 1 | 6+1 | 1 | 3+0 | 0 | 0+0 | 0 | 0+0 | 0 |
| 4 | DF | (United States) USA | Hal Uderitz | 15 | 1 | 14+0 | 1 | 0+0 | 0 | 0+0 | 0 | 1+0 | 0 |
| 5 | DF | (Italy) ITA | Luca Mastrantonio | 36 | 3 | 26+2 | 2 | 3+0 | 0 | 3+1 | 0 | 1+0 | 1 |
| 6 | MF | (Senegal) SEN | Omar Ciss | 19 | 1 | 14+3 | 1 | 0+0 | 0 | 1+0 | 0 | 1+0 | 0 |
| 7 | FW | (United States) USA | Taylor Gray | 28 | 1 | 17+4 | 0 | 1+2 | 1 | 2+2 | 0 | 0+0 | 0 |
| 8 | MF | (United States) USA | Juan Osorio | 29 | 0 | 12+11 | 0 | 1+1 | 0 | 2+1 | 0 | 1+0 | 0 |
| 9 | FW | (United States) USA | Gio Miglietti | 35 | 5 | 22+6 | 5 | 1+1 | 0 | 2+2 | 0 | 1+0 | 0 |
| 10 | MF | (Colombia) COL | Andrés Ferrín | 36 | 8 | 15+13 | 7 | 3+0 | 1 | 2+2 | 0 | 0+1 | 0 |
| | DF | (England) ENG | Max Broughton | 0 | 0 | 0+0 | 0 | 0+0 | 0 | 0+0 | 0 | 0+0 | 0 |
| 11 | MF | (United States) USA | Christopher Garcia | 32 | 5 | 18+8 | 5 | 2+0 | 0 | 3+0 | 0 | 0+1 | 0 |
| 12 | DF | (Haiti) HAI | Hudson Gay | 22 | 2 | 2+17 | 1 | 1+0 | 1 | 1+1 | 0 | 0+0 | 0 |
| 14 | DF | (Republic of Ireland) IRL | Kevin O'Connor | 40 | 2 | 29+3 | 2 | 3+0 | 0 | 2+2 | 0 | 1+0 | 0 |
| 16 | MF | (United States) USA | Alexander Bulai-Tudor | 6 | 0 | 0+5 | 0 | 0+0 | 0 | 0+1 | 0 | 0+0 | 0 |
| 17 | GK | (United States) USA | Tony Halterman | 1 | 0 | 1+0 | 0 | 0+0 | 0 | 0+0 | 0 | 0+0 | 0 |
| 18 | FW | (United States) USA | Dominick Bachstein | 20 | 4 | 7+8 | 2 | 0+2 | 1 | 3+0 | 1 | 0+0 | 0 |
| 19 | MF | (Colombia) COL | William Arevalo | 21 | 3 | 7+9 | 3 | 0+1 | 0 | 2+2 | 0 | 0+0 | 0 |
| 20 | DF | (Trinidad and Tobago) TTO | Jaylen Yearwood | 22 | 0 | 19+0 | 0 | 0+0 | 0 | 1+1 | 0 | 1+0 | 0 |
| 21 | MF | (Spain) ESP | Marc Torrellas | 37 | 3 | 26+4 | 2 | 3+0 | 1 | 3+0 | 0 | 1+0 | 0 |
| 22 | DF | (United States) USA | Joshua Yoder | 21 | 0 | 11+4 | 0 | 3+0 | 0 | 3+0 | 0 | 0+0 | 0 |
| 23 | MF | (England) ENG | Aiden Mesias | 36 | 1 | 21+8 | 1 | 2+1 | 0 | 2+1 | 0 | 0+1 | 0 |
| 24 | MF | (United States) USA | Ty Collins | 11 | 2 | 5+5 | 2 | 0+0 | 0 | 0+0 | 0 | 1+0 | 0 |
| 30 | MF | (United States) USA | Ian Cerro | 25 | 0 | 6+13 | 0 | 1+2 | 0 | 1+2 | 0 | 0+0 | 0 |
| 31 | DF | (United States) USA | Tristen Rose | 17 | 0 | 5+9 | 0 | 0+0 | 0 | 2+1 | 0 | 0+0 | 0 |
| 34 | GK | (Republic of Ireland) IRL | Luca Cy Fitzgerald | 0 | 0 | 0+0 | 0 | 0+0 | 0 | 0+0 | 0 | 0+0 | 0 |
| 45 | FW | (France) FRA | Nicolas Likulia | 14 | 3 | 4+9 | 3 | 0+0 | 0 | 0+0 | 0 | 0+1 | 0 |
| 77 | MF | (Liberia) LBR | Aryeh Miller | 0 | 0 | 0+0 | 0 | 0+0 | 0 | 0+0 | 0 | 0+0 | 0 |
| 99 | GK | (Jamaica) JAM | Joshua Grant | 8 | 0 | 4+0 | 0 | 0+1 | 0 | 2+1 | 0 | 0+0 | 0 |

=== Top goalscorers ===
| Rank | Position | Number | Name | USL1 Season | U.S. Open Cup | USL Cup | USL League One Playoffs | Total |
|---|---|---|---|---|---|---|---|---|
| 1 | MF | 10 | (Colombia) Andrés Ferrín | 7 | 1 | 0 | 0 | 8 |
| 2 | FW | 9 | (United States) Gio Miglietti | 5 | 0 | 0 | 0 | 5 |
| 2 | MF | 11 | (United States) Christopher Garcia | 5 | 0 | 0 | 0 | 5 |
| 4 | FW | 18 | (United States) Dominick Bachstein | 2 | 1 | 1 | 0 | 4 |
| 5 | MF | 19 | (Colombia) William Avarelo | 3 | 0 | 0 | 0 | 3 |
| 5 | FW | 42 | (France) Nicolas Likulia | 3 | 0 | 0 | 0 | 3 |
| 5 | MF | 21 | (Spain) Marc Torrellas | 2 | 1 | 0 | 0 | 3 |
| 5 | DF | 5 | (Italy) Luca Mastrantonio | 2 | 0 | 0 | 1 | 3 |
| 5 | DF | 3 | (United States) Julian Cisneros | 1 | 1 | 1 | 0 | 3 |
| 10 | MF | 14 | (Republic of Ireland) Kevin O'Connor | 2 | 0 | 0 | 0 | 2 |
| 10 | MF | 24 | (United States) Ty Collins | 2 | 0 | 0 | 0 | 2 |
| 10 | MF | 12 | (Haiti) Hudson Gay | 1 | 1 | 0 | 0 | 2 |
| 13 | DF | 4 | (United States) Hal Uderitz | 1 | 0 | 0 | 0 | 1 |
| 13 | DF | 4 | (Nicaragua) Max Glasser | 1 | 0 | 0 | 0 | 1 |
| 13 | MF | 6 | (Senegal) Omar Ciss | 1 | 0 | 0 | 0 | 1 |
| 13 | MF | 23 | (England) Aiden Mesias | 1 | 0 | 0 | 0 | 1 |
| 13 | FW | 7 | (United States) Taylor Gray | 0 | 1 | 0 | 0 | 1 |
| Total | | | | 39 | 6 | 2 | 1 | 48 |

=== Assist scorers ===
| Rank | Position | Number | Name | USL1 Season | U.S. Open Cup | USL Cup | USL League One Playoffs | Total |
|---|---|---|---|---|---|---|---|---|
| 1 | MF | 14 | (Republic of Ireland) Kevin O'Connor | 7 | 2 | 0 | 0 | 9 |
| 2 | MF | 11 | (United States) Christopher Garcia | 6 | 0 | 0 | 0 | 6 |
| 3 | MF | 21 | (Spain) Marc Torrellas | 3 | 0 | 1 | 0 | 4 |
| 4 | DF | 3 | (United States) Julian Cisneros | 3 | 0 | 0 | 0 | 3 |
| 5 | MF | 6 | (Senegal) Omar Ciss | 1 | 0 | 0 | 1 | 2 |
| 6 | GK | 1 | (United States) Edward Delgado | 1 | 0 | 0 | 0 | 1 |
| 6 | MF | 8 | (United States) Juan Osorio | 1 | 0 | 0 | 0 | 1 |
| 6 | FW | 9 | (United States) Gio Miglietti | 1 | 0 | 0 | 0 | 1 |
| 6 | DF | 20 | (Trinidad and Tobago) Jaylen Yearwood | 1 | 0 | 0 | 0 | 1 |
| 6 | MF | 24 | (United States) Ty Collins | 1 | 0 | 0 | 0 | 1 |
| 6 | DF | 4 | (Nicaragua) Max Glasser | 0 | 1 | 0 | 0 | 1 |
| 6 | FW | 7 | (United States) Taylor Gray | 0 | 1 | 0 | 0 | 1 |
| 6 | MF | 30 | (United States) Ian Cerro | 0 | 1 | 0 | 0 | 1 |
| 6 | MF | 10 | (Colombia) Andrés Ferrín | 0 | 0 | 1 | 0 | 1 |
| Total | | | | 25 | 5 | 2 | 1 | 33 |

=== Clean sheets ===
| Rank | Number | Name | USL1 Season | U.S. Open Cup | USL Cup | Total |
|---|---|---|---|---|---|---|
| 1 | 1 | (United States) Edward Delgado | 4 | 2 | 0 | 6 |
| 2 | 99 | (Jamaica) Joshua Grant | 1 | 0 | 0 | 1 |
| Total | | | 5 | 2 | 0 | 7 |

=== Disciplinary record ===
| No. | Pos. | Player | USL League One Regular Season | | | Lamar Hunt US Open Cup | | | USL Cup | | | USL League One Playoffs | | | Total | | |
| No. | Pos. | Player | Yellow card | (yellow card) (yellow-red card) | Red card | Yellow card | (yellow card) (yellow-red card) | Red card | Yellow card | (yellow card) (yellow-red card) | Red card | Yellow card | (yellow card) (yellow-red card) | Red card | Yellow card | (yellow card) (yellow-red card) | Red card |
| 1 | GK | (United States) Lalo Delgado | 3 | 0 | 0 | 0 | 0 | 0 | 0 | 0 | 0 | 0 | 0 | 0 | 3 | 0 | 0 |
| 2 | DF | (United States) Jaden Strumeier | 1 | 0 | 0 | 0 | 0 | 0 | 0 | 0 | 0 | 0 | 0 | 0 | 1 | 0 | 0 |
| 3 | DF | (United States) Julian Cisneros | 8 | 0 | 0 | 1 | 0 | 0 | 1 | 0 | 0 | 0 | 0 | 0 | 10 | 0 | 0 |
| 4 | DF | (Nicaragua) Max Glasser | 0 | 0 | 0 | 0 | 0 | 0 | 0 | 0 | 0 | 0 | 0 | 0 | 0 | 0 | 0 |
| 4 | DF | (United States) Hal Uderitz | 4 | 0 | 0 | 0 | 0 | 0 | 0 | 0 | 0 | 0 | 0 | 0 | 4 | 0 | 0 |
| 5 | DF | (Italy) Luca Mastrantonio | 5 | 0 | 0 | 0 | 0 | 0 | 0 | 0 | 0 | 0 | 0 | 0 | 5 | 0 | 0 |
| 6 | MF | (Senegal) Omar Ciss | 4 | 0 | 0 | 0 | 0 | 0 | 1 | 0 | 0 | 0 | 0 | 0 | 5 | 0 | 0 |
| 7 | FW | (United States) Taylor Gray | 3 | 0 | 0 | 0 | 0 | 0 | 0 | 0 | 0 | 0 | 0 | 0 | 3 | 0 | 0 |
| 8 | MF | (United States) Juan Osorio | 4 | 0 | 0 | 0 | 0 | 0 | 1 | 0 | 0 | 1 | 0 | 0 | 6 | 0 | 0 |
| 9 | FW | (United States) Gio Miglietti | 5 | 0 | 0 | 0 | 0 | 0 | 0 | 0 | 0 | 0 | 0 | 0 | 5 | 0 | 0 |
| 10 | MF | (Colombia) Andres Ferrin | 4 | 0 | 0 | 0 | 0 | 0 | 1 | 0 | 0 | 0 | 0 | 0 | 5 | 0 | 0 |
| 11 | MF | (United States) Christopher Garcia | 2 | 1 | 0 | 2 | 0 | 0 | 0 | 0 | 0 | 0 | 0 | 0 | 4 | 1 | 0 |
| 12 | DF | (Haiti) Hudson Gay | 5 | 0 | 0 | 1 | 0 | 0 | 0 | 0 | 1 | 0 | 0 | 0 | 6 | 0 | 1 |
| 14 | DF | (Republic of Ireland) Kevin O'Connor | 1 | 0 | 0 | 0 | 0 | 0 | 0 | 0 | 0 | 0 | 0 | 0 | 1 | 0 | 0 |
| 16 | MF | (United States) Alexander Bulai-Tudor | 0 | 0 | 0 | 0 | 0 | 0 | 1 | 0 | 0 | 0 | 0 | 0 | 1 | 0 | 0 |
| 17 | GK | (United States) Tony Halterman | 0 | 0 | 0 | 0 | 0 | 0 | 0 | 0 | 0 | 0 | 0 | 0 | 0 | 0 | 0 |
| 18 | FW | (United States) Dominick Bachstein | 3 | 0 | 0 | 0 | 0 | 0 | 0 | 0 | 0 | 0 | 0 | 0 | 3 | 0 | 0 |
| 19 | MF | (Colombia) William Arevalo | 1 | 0 | 0 | 0 | 0 | 0 | 0 | 0 | 0 | 0 | 0 | 0 | 1 | 0 | 0 |
| 20 | DF | (Trinidad and Tobago) Jaylen Yearwood | 2 | 0 | 0 | 0 | 0 | 0 | 0 | 0 | 0 | 0 | 0 | 0 | 2 | 0 | 0 |
| 21 | MF | (Spain) Marc Torrellas | 6 | 0 | 0 | 0 | 0 | 0 | 0 | 0 | 0 | 0 | 0 | 0 | 6 | 0 | 0 |
| 22 | DF | (United States) Joshua Yoder | 2 | 0 | 0 | 0 | 0 | 0 | 1 | 0 | 0 | 0 | 0 | 0 | 3 | 0 | 0 |
| 23 | MF | (England) Aiden Mesias | 1 | 0 | 0 | 1 | 0 | 0 | 0 | 0 | 0 | 0 | 0 | 0 | 2 | 0 | 0 |
| 30 | MF | (United States) Ian Cerro | 1 | 0 | 0 | 0 | 0 | 0 | 0 | 0 | 0 | 0 | 0 | 0 | 1 | 0 | 0 |
| 31 | DF | (United States) Tristen Rose | 1 | 0 | 0 | 0 | 0 | 0 | 1 | 0 | 0 | 0 | 0 | 0 | 2 | 0 | 0 |
| 34 | GK | (Republic of Ireland) Luca Cy Fitzgerald | 0 | 0 | 0 | 0 | 0 | 0 | 0 | 0 | 0 | 0 | 0 | 0 | 0 | 0 | 0 |
| 45 | FW | (France) Nicolas Likulia | 3 | 0 | 0 | 0 | 0 | 0 | 0 | 0 | 0 | 0 | 0 | 0 | 3 | 0 | 0 |
| 77 | MF | (Liberia) Aryeh Miller | 0 | 0 | 0 | 0 | 0 | 0 | 0 | 0 | 0 | 0 | 0 | 0 | 0 | 0 | 0 |
| 99 | GK | (Jamaica) Joshua Grant | 0 | 0 | 0 | 0 | 0 | 0 | 0 | 0 | 0 | 0 | 0 | 0 | 0 | 0 | 0 |
| | DF | (England) Max Broughton | 0 | 0 | 0 | 0 | 0 | 0 | 0 | 0 | 0 | 0 | 0 | 0 | 0 | 0 | 0 |
| | Coaching | (United States) Matt Poland | 2 | 0 | 0 | 0 | 0 | 0 | 0 | 0 | 0 | 0 | 0 | 0 | 2 | 0 | 0 |
| | Coaching | (United States) Zak Gordon | 3 | 0 | 0 | 0 | 0 | 0 | 0 | 0 | 0 | 0 | 0 | 0 | 3 | 0 | 0 |
| Total | | | 74 | 1 | 0 | 5 | 0 | 0 | 7 | 0 | 1 | 1 | 0 | 0 | 87 | 1 | 1 |

== Honors and awards ==
=== USL League One Team of the Week ===
| Week | Player | Opponent | Position | Ref |
|---|---|---|---|---|
| 1 | (United States) Julian Cisneros | Fort Wayne FC | DF | |
| 1 | (Spain) Marc Torrellas | Fort Wayne FC | MF | |
| 1 | (United States) Lalo Delgado | Fort Wayne FC | Bench | |
| 1 | (United States) Christopher Garcia | Fort Wayne FC | Bench | |
| 2 | (United States) Christopher Garcia | Corpus Christi FC | FW | |
| 3 | (United States) Lalo Delgado | Richmond Kickers | GK | |
| 3 | (United States) Julian Cisneros | Richmond Kickers | DF | |
| 3 | (Republic of Ireland) Kevin O’Connor | Richmond Kickers | MF | |
| 3 | (Italy) Luca Mastrantonio | Richmond Kickers | Bench | |
| 3 | (Spain) Marc Torrellas | Richmond Kickers | Bench | |
| 5 | (Italy) Luca Mastrantonio | Greenville Triumph SC | Bench | |
| 6 | (United States) Christopher Garcia | Sarasota Paradise | FW | |
| 6 | (Spain) Marc Torrellas | Sarasota Paradise | Bench | |
| 7 | (Nicaragua) Max Glasser | Portland Hearts of Pine | DF | |
| 12 | (Colombia) William Arevalo | Westchester SC | Bench | |
| 14/15 | (Republic of Ireland) Kevin O’Connor | Charlotte Independence | Bench | |
| 23 | (Republic of Ireland) Kevin O’Connor | Charlotte Independence | MF | |
| 23 | (United States) Lalo Delgado | Charlotte Independence | Bench | |
| 25 | (United States) Christopher Garcia | AV Alta FC | FW | |
| 25 | (Trinidad and Tobago) Jaylen Yearwood | AV Alta FC | Bench | |
| 28 | (United States) Lalo Delgado | One Knoxville SC | GK | |
| 28 | (Spain) Marc Torrellas | One Knoxville SC | MF | |
| 30 | (United States) Lalo Delgado | Chattanooga Red Wolves SC | GK | |
| 30 | (United States) Gio Miglietti | Chattanooga Red Wolves SC | Bench | |
| 31 | (Senegal) Omar Ciss | New York Cosmos | MF | |
| 31 | (Spain) Marc Torrellas | New York Cosmos | Bench | |
| 32 | (United States) Lalo Delgado | Richmond Kickers and Corpus Christi FC | GK | |
| 32 | (United States) Zak Gordon | Richmond Kickers and Corpus Christi FC | Head Coach | |
| 32 | (United States) Gio Miglietti | Richmond Kickers | Bench | |
| 34 | (Republic of Ireland) Kevin O’Connor | Sarasota Paradise and Spokane Velocity | MF | |
| 34 | (United States) Zak Gordon | Sarasota Paradise and Spokane Velocity | Head Coach | |
| 34 | (United States) Hal Uderitz | Sarasota Paradise and Spokane Velocity | Bench | |
| 34 | (United States) Ty Collins | Sarasota Paradise and Spokane Velocity | Bench | |

=== USL League One Goal of the Week ===
| Week | Player | Opponent | Position | Ref |
|---|---|---|---|---|
| 1 | (United States) Christopher Garcia | Fort Wayne FC | FW | |
| 24 | (France) Nicolas Likulia | Westchester SC | FW | |
| 29 | (United States) Julian Cisneros | Fort Wayne FC | DF | |
| 31 | (Senegal) Omar Ciss | New York Cosmos | MF | |
| 34 | (Colombia) Andrés Ferrín | Spokane Velocity | MF | |

=== USL League One Save of the Week ===
| Week | Player | Opponent | Ref |
|---|---|---|---|
| 5 | (United States) Edward Delgado | Greenville Triumph SC | |
| 28 | (United States) Edward Delgado | One Knoxville SC | |
| 30 | (United States) Edward Delgado | Chattanooga Red Wolves SC | |

=== USL League One Monthly Awards ===
==== USL League One Player of the Month ====
| Month | Player | Position | Ref |
|---|---|---|---|
| September | (United States) Lalo Delgado | GK | |

==== USL League One Coach of the Month ====
| Month | Coach | Ref |
|---|---|---|
| October | (United States) Zak Gordon | |
