= 2026 Forward Madison FC season =

Forward Madison FC
2026 season
- Owner: Big Top Events
- Chief operating officer: Conor Caloia
- Head coach: Matt Glaeser
- Stadium: Breese Stevens Field
- USL League One: 4th
- USL1 Playoffs: Semifinals
- U.S. Open Cup: First round
- USL Cup: Group 4: 6th
- Top goalscorer: League: Ryan Carmichael (14); All: Ryan Carmichael (16)
- Highest home attendance: 4,820 (October 17 vs. POR)
- Lowest home attendance: 3,106 (September 2 vs. KNX)
- Average home league attendance: 3,780
- Biggest win: 4 goals: MAD 5–1 ACB (June 13); MAD 4–0 RIC (July 15)
- Biggest defeat: 2 goals: FCB 2–0 MAD (March 19, USOC); LEX 4–2 MAD (April 25, USL Cup); AV 2–0 MAD (May 9); CLT 3–1 MAD (May 23); IND 2–0 MAD (June 6, USL Cup)
- All statistics correct as of November 8, 2026.

The 2026 Forward Madison FC season was the eighth season in the soccer team's history, where they compete in USL League One of the third division of American soccer.

== Club ==
=== Roster ===
No.	Pos.	Nat.	Name	Date of birth (age)	Since	On loan from
1	GK	(United States)	JT Harms	March 1, 2002 (age 24)	2026	
3	DF	(United States)	AJ Edwards	October 31, 2002 (age 24)	2026	
4	DF	(United States)	Collin McCamy	May 16, 2003 (age 23)	2026	
5	DF	(United States)	Jaylen Shannon	February 10, 2000 (age 26)	2026	
6	DF	(South Africa)	Geni Kanyane	September 19, 2001 (age 25)	2026	
7	MF	(Ghana)	Joshua Bolma	April 10, 2002 (age 24)	2026	
8	MF	(United States)	Mark Segbers	April 18, 1996 (age 30)	2026	
9	FW	(Northern Ireland)	Ryan Carmichael	August 3, 2001 (age 25)	2026	
11	FW	(Ivory Coast)	Claudel N'goubou	June 22, 2001 (age 25)	2026	
12	MF	(United States)	Roman Torres	March 30, 2002 (age 24)	2026	
13	DF	(United States)	Turner Humphrey	October 16, 2000 (age 26)	2026	
14	FW	(Ghana)	Stephen Annor Gyamfi	May 19, 2003 (age 23)	2026	
16	MF	(United States)	Jackson Castro	December 24, 2002 (age 23)	2026	
17	FW	(United States)	Derek Gebhard	October 15, 1995 (age 31)	2021	
19	GK	(United States)	Tenzing Manske	August 21, 2002 (age 24)	2026	
20	DF	(United States)	Kevin Carmichael	June 10, 2002 (age 24)	2026	
21	FW	(United States)	Hakim Karamoko	November 1, 2005 (age 21)	2026	D.C. United
23	DF	(United States)	Eddie Munjoma	July 18, 1998 (age 28)	2025	
24	DF	(United States)	Jahlane Forbes	February 5, 2002 (age 24)	2026	
27	FW	(United States)	Herbert Endeley	October 9, 2001 (age 25)	2026	
28	DF	(United States)	Joe Hildal (Note: USL Academy contract)	September 19, 2007 (age 19)	2026	Forward Madison FC Academy
30	MF	(Panama)	Enrique Machasen	December 17, 2003 (age 22)	2026	(Panama) C.D. Universitario
33	DF	(Canada)	Kerfalla Toure	February 22, 2001 (age 25)	2026	
38	FW	(United States)	Maouloune Goumballe	June 21, 2001 (age 25)	2026	
57	MF	(United States)	Ben Augee	March 1, 2004 (age 22)	2026	
99	GK	(United States)	Kevin Flores	May 16, 2008 (age 18)	2026	Forward Madison FC Academy

=== Left team mid-season ===
No.	Pos.	Nat.	Name	Date of birth (age)	Since	On loan from
18	MF	(United States)	Kage Romanshyn Jr.	June 19, 2005 (age 21)	2026	Minnesota United FC 2
25	FW	(United States)	Tyler Trimnal	January 28, 2004 (age 22)	2026	

=== Coaching staff ===
Name	Position
(United States) Matt Glaeser	Head coach and technical director
(United States) Aaron Hohlbein	Assistant coach
(United States) Jim Launder	Assistant coach
(Ghana) Patrick Nyarko	Assistant coach
(United States) Kyle Swanson	Goalkeeper coach
(United States) Jacob Schmidt	Sports performance director

=== Front office staff ===
Name	Position
(United States) Conor Caloia	Chief operating officer
(England) Matt Cairns	Sporting director
(United States) Keith Tiemeyer	Director of Soccer Operations & Development

== Player movement ==
=== Returning players ===
Date	Position	Player	Notes	Ref.
December 2, 2025	FW	(United States) Derek Gebhard	Re-signed	
March 13, 2026	DF	(United States) Eddie Munjoma	Re-signed	

=== Transfers in ===
Date	Position	Player	Last team	Type	Ref.
December 3, 2025	MF	(United States) Mark Segbers	Charleston Battery	Free transfer	
December 17, 2025	FW	(Northern Ireland) Ryan Carmichael	Atlanta United 2	Free transfer	
January 7, 2026	DF	(United States) Collin McCamy	New York City FC II	Free transfer	
January 9, 2026	DF	(United States) Turner Humphrey	Las Vegas Lights FC	Free transfer	
January 12, 2026	MF	(Panama) Enrique Machasen	(Panama) C.D. Universitario	Loan	
January 14, 2026	DF	(South Africa) Geni Kanyane	Chicago Fire FC II	Free transfer	
January 21, 2026	MF	(United States) Jackson Castro	Whitecaps FC 2	Free transfer	
January 23, 2026	FW	(Ivory Coast) Claudel N'goubou	UCF Knights	Free transfer	
January 27, 2026	DF	(Canada) Kerfalla Toure	Florida Atlantic Owls	Free transfer	
February 3, 2026	DF	(United States) Jaylen Shannon	Chicago Fire FC II	Free transfer	
February 5, 2026	DF	(United States) AJ Edwards	Sacramento Republic FC	Free transfer	
February 5, 2026	MF	(United States) Roman Torres	Minnesota United FC 2	Free transfer	
February 13, 2026	GK	(United States) JT Harms	North Texas SC	Free transfer	
February 17, 2026	DF	(United States) Kevin Carmichael	Huntsville City FC	Free transfer	
February 20, 2026	GK	(United States) Tenzing Manske	Georgetown Hoyas	Free transfer	
February 27, 2026	FW	(Ghana) Stephen Annor Gyamfi	Houston Dynamo 2	Free transfer	
March 10, 2026	GK	(United States) Kevin Flores	Forward Madison FC Academy	Loan	
March 13, 2026	MF	(United States) Kage Romanshyn Jr.	Minnesota United FC 2	Loan	
March 18, 2026	FW	(United States) Tyler Trimnal	South Carolina Gamecocks	Free transfer	
April 9, 2026	MF	(Ghana) Joshua Bolma	Houston Dynamo 2	Free transfer	
May 27, 2026	FW	(United States) Hakim Karamoko	D.C. United	Loan	
June 4, 2026	DF	(United States) Joe Hildal	Forward Madison FC Academy	Loan	
June 29, 2026	FW	(United States) Herbert Endeley	FC Dallas	Free transfer	
June 30, 2026	DF	(United States) Jahlane Forbes	Las Vegas Lights FC	Paid transfer	
August 11, 2026	MF	(United States) Ben Augee	FC Cincinnati 2	Free transfer	
August 31, 2026	FW	(United States) Maouloane Goumballe	Sporting Kansas City II	Free transfer	

=== Transfers out ===
Date	Position	Player	To	Type	Ref.
October 27, 2025	MF	(Puerto Rico) Isaac Angking	Rhode Island FC	End of loan	
October 27, 2025	FW	(Jamaica) Nico Brown	Lexington SC	End of loan	
October 27, 2025	FW	(Brazil) Lucca Dourado	Birmingham Legion FC	End of loan	
October 27, 2025	MF	(Nigeria) Temi Ereku	Birmingham Legion FC	End of loan	
October 27, 2025	FW	(United States) Adrien Graffin	(Brazil) Amazonas	End of loan	
November 1, 2025	FW	(South Africa) Nazeem Bartman		Retired	
November 12, 2025	FW	(United States) Garrett McLaughlin	Sarasota Paradise	Free transfer	
December 11, 2025	GK	(United States) Wallis Lapsley		Retired	
December 26, 2025	MF	(England) Aiden Mesias	FC Naples	Free transfer	
January 12, 2026	DF	(Austria) Jake Crull	Athletic Club Boise	Free transfer	
January 14, 2026	MF	(United States) Devin Boyce	Greenville Triumph SC	Free transfer	
January 20, 2026	MF	(United States) Christopher Garcia	FC Naples	Free transfer	
January 20, 2026	MF	(United States) John Murphy Jr.	One Knoxville SC	Free transfer	
January 21, 2026	DF	(Israel) Michael Chilaka	(Israel) Maccabi Jaffa F.C.	Free transfer	
January 24, 2026	GK	(Philippines) Bernd Schipmann	Fort Wayne FC	Free transfer	
January 26, 2026	MF	(Germany) Jackson Dietrich	Corpus Christi FC	Free transfer	
April 12, 2026	FW	(United States) Tyler Trimnal		Contract expired	
May 1, 2026	GK	(Australia) Mitch Osmond		Retired	
August 21, 2026	MF	(United States) Kage Romanshyn Jr.	Minnesota United FC 2	Recalled from loan	

== Exhibitions ==
February 13, 2026 Preseason 1	Minnesota United FC 2	1–1	Forward Madison FC	Blaine, Minnesota
				Stadium: National Sports Center
Note: Closed to the public.

February 21, 2026 Preseason 2	Chicago Fire FC II	0–4	Forward Madison FC	Bridgeview, Illinois
		Report	Edwards; Torres; Gyamfi; Trialist	Stadium: Bridgeview Sports Dome
Note: Closed to the public.

February 27, 2026 Preseason 3	Indy Eleven	0–0	Forward Madison FC	Westfield, Indiana
10:00 AM EST		Report		Stadium: Grand Park Events Center
Note: Closed to the public.

March 7, 2026 Preseason 4	Detroit City FC	v	Forward Madison FC	Kalamazoo, Michigan
		Report		Stadium: WMU Soccer Complex
Note: Closed to the public. Score not announced.

July 4, 2026 Midseason 1	Forward Madison FC	1–1	Peoria City	Madison, Wisconsin
6:30 PM CDT	Karamoko 3' (Edwards)	Report	Karmbor 61'	Stadium: Breese Stevens Field

August 26, 2026 Midseason 2	Forward Madison FC	1–2	FC Juárez U21	Madison, Wisconsin
7:00 PM CDT	Kigeya 13' (Akale)	Report	84'	Stadium: Breese Stevens Field

== Competitions ==
=== Overview ===
Competition	First match	Last match	Starting round	Final position	Record							
Competition	First match	Last match	Starting round	Final position	Pld	W	D	L	GF	GA	GD	Win %
USL League One	March 14, 2026	October 24, 2026	Matchday 1	4th	32	16	8	8	54	30	+24	50.00
USL1 Playoffs	October 30, 2026	November 8, 2026	Quarterfinals	Semifinals	2	1	0	1	3	3	+0	50.00
U.S. Open Cup	March 19, 2026		First round	First round	1	0	0	1	0	2	−2	0.00
USL Cup	April 25, 2026	July 11, 2026	Group stage	Group 4: 6th	4	1	0	3	6	10	−4	25.00
Total					39	18	8	13	63	45	+18	46.15

Source: Competitions

=== USL League One ===
==== Standings ====
Pos	Team	Pld	W	L	T	GF	GA	GD	Pts	Qualification
2	Union Omaha	32	19	8	5	54	34	+20	62	Playoffs
3	AC Boise	32	17	8	7	51	41	+10	58	Playoffs
4	Forward Madison FC	32	16	8	8	54	30	+24	56	Playoffs
5	Spokane Velocity FC	32	16	10	6	50	44	+6	54	Playoffs
6	One Knoxville SC	32	15	8	9	52	36	+16	54	Playoffs

Source: USL League One
Rules for classification: 1) points; 2) total wins; 3) total goal differential; 4) total goals scored; 5) points earned against top four finishers; 6) disciplinary points; 7) drawing of lots.

==== Results summary ====
Overall								Home						Away					
Pld	W	D	L	GF	GA	GD	Pts	W	D	L	GF	GA	GD	W	D	L	GF	GA	GD
32	16	8	8	54	30	+24	56	9	6	1	35	11	+24	7	2	7	19	19	0

Source: USL League One

==== Results by round ====
Round	1	2	3	4	5	6	7	8	9	10	11	12	13	14	15	16	17	18	19	20	21	22	23	24	25	26	27	28	29	30	31	32
Stadium	A	A	A	A	A	A	A	H	A	H	H	H	A	H	H	H	H	A	H	A	H	A	H	A	H	A	H	H	A	A	H	H
Result	W	W	L	D	W	L	L	W	L	W	D	W	W	W	W	W	W	L	D	W	D	W	D	W	D	L	W	L	D	L	W	D
Position	4	2	4	3	2	6	10	7	9	6	6	4	4	4	3	2	1	2	3	3	3	3	3	2	3	3	3	3	3	4	3	4
Points	3	6	6	7	10	10	10	13	13	16	17	20	23	26	29	32	35	35	36	39	40	43	44	47	48	48	51	51	52	52	55	56

Source: USL League One
H = Home; A = Away; W = Win; D = Draw; L = Loss

==== Matches ====
March 14, 2026 1	One Knoxville SC	1–2	Forward Madison FC	Knoxville, Tennessee
7:00 PM EDT	Murphy Jr. 16'; Caputo (yellow card) 34'; Zarokostas (yellow card) 42'	Report	K. Carmichael (yellow card) 13'; Humphrey 24' (Torres); Kanyane (yellow card) 36'; Annor Gyamfi 39' (Kanyane); Segbers (yellow card) 45+4'; Machasen (yellow card) 52'; Torres (yellow card) 56'	Stadium: Covenant Health Park; Attendance: 4,568; Referee: Edson Carvajal

March 28, 2026 2	FC Naples	0–1	Forward Madison FC	Naples, Florida
7:00 PM EDT	Cerro (yellow card) 51'	Report	Annor Gyamfi 20' (Torres); Torres (yellow card) 31'; Munjoma (yellow card) 86'; Harms (yellow card) 90+4'	Stadium: Paradise Coast Sports Complex Stadium; Attendance: 3,147; Referee: Amin Hadzic

April 11, 2026 3	Union Omaha	1–0	Forward Madison FC	Omaha, Nebraska
4:00 PM CDT	Botello Faz 78' (pen.); Knapp (yellow card) 80'; Wootton (yellow card) 85'; Gómez (yellow card) 90'	Report	Edwards (yellow card) 51'	Stadium: Morrison Stadium; Attendance: 1,520; Referee: Alejo Calume

April 19, 2026 4	New York Cosmos	2–2	Forward Madison FC	Paterson, New Jersey
2:00 PM EDT	Koffi (yellow card) 37'; Spengler 49'; Guenzatti 50'	Report	Kanyane 22' (red card) 32'; R. Carmichael 34'; N'goubou (yellow card) 74'; Torres (yellow card) 90+2'	Stadium: Hinchliffe Stadium; Attendance: 931; Referee: Jeremy Scheer

May 2, 2026 5	Sarasota Paradise	1–3	Forward Madison FC	Lakewood Ranch, Florida
7:30 PM EDT	Bolanos 27' (Røed); Watters (yellow card) 68'	Report	Gebhard 24'; Edwards (yellow card) 58'; Humphrey 84' (Machasen); Bolma 86' (Annor Gyamfi)	Stadium: Premier Sports Complex at Lakewood Ranch; Attendance: 1,437; Referee: Elvis Osmanovic

May 9, 2026 6	AV Alta FC	2–0	Forward Madison FC	Lancaster, California
7:30 PM PDT	Desdunes 6' (pen.); Antwi 21' (Thomas); Pajaro (red card) 44'; Smith (yellow card) 57'; Ibarra (yellow card) 76'	Report	Torres (yellow card) 19'; K. Carmichael (yellow card) 60'; Munjoma (yellow card) 82'; Annor Gyamfi (yellow card) 89'	Stadium: Lancaster Municipal Stadium; Attendance: 4,109; Referee: Mark Verso

May 20, 2026	South Georgia Tormenta FC	v	Forward Madison FC	Statesboro, Georgia
7:30 PM EDT				Stadium: Tormenta Stadium
Note: Game cancelled following South Georgia Tormenta FC's withdrawal from USL League One.

May 23, 2026 7	Charlotte Independence	3–1	Forward Madison FC	Matthews, North Carolina
7:00 PM EDT	Álvarez 17'; Manzinga 24' (Saydee); Skinner (yellow card) 80'; Lyons 88'	Report	Annor Gyamfi 14' (Munjoma); Torres (yellow card) 38' (red card) 90+2'; Munjoma (yellow card) 42'; Gebhard (yellow card) 67'	Stadium: Sportsplex at Matthews; Attendance: 548; Referee: Kyle Johnston

May 29, 2026 8	Forward Madison FC	3–0	Corpus Christi FC	Madison, Wisconsin
6:00 PM CDT	Annor Gyamfi 8' (Castro); Gebhard 22'; Shannon (yellow card) 31'; N'goubou 73' (Bolma); Castro (yellow card) 90+1'	Report	Roscoe (yellow card) 40'; Kwakwa (yellow card) 81'; Keaney (yellow card) 87'	Stadium: Breese Stevens Field; Attendance: 3,963; Referee: Laadi Issaka

June 3, 2026 9	Greenville Triumph SC	1–0	Forward Madison FC	Mauldin, South Carolina
7:00 PM EDT	Liadi 14' (Boyce), (yellow card) 56'; Seagrist (yellow card) 44'; Boyce (yellow card) 45+2'; Herrera (yellow card) 79'	Report	Toure (yellow card) 83'; Segbers (yellow card) 89'; K. Carmichael (yellow card) 90+2'	Stadium: GE Vernova Park; Attendance: 4,252; Referee: Benjamin Meyer

June 13, 2026 10	Forward Madison FC	5–1	Athletic Club Boise	Madison, Wisconsin
7:00 PM CDT	Gebhard 39' (N'goubou); Bolma (yellow card) 49'; Kanyane (yellow card) 53'; Karamoko 66' (N'goubou); K. Carmichael (yellow card) 70'; R. Carmichael 71' (Torres); Torres 75' (Castro); Toure 90+1' (McCamy); Segbers (yellow card) 90+3'	Report	Ricketts (yellow card) 43'; Brito 50' (Amang)	Stadium: Breese Stevens Field; Attendance: 3,393; Referee: Carlos Rodriguez

June 17, 2026 11	Forward Madison FC	1–1	Fort Wayne FC	Madison, Wisconsin
8:00 PM CDT	Toure (yellow card) 23'; Bolma 28' (R. Carmichael); Torres (yellow card) 86'	Report	Ricol (yellow card) 45'; Becher 59'; Jordan (yellow card) 80'; Gafar (yellow card) 82'	Stadium: Breese Stevens Field; Attendance: 3,170; Referee: John Griggs

June 20, 2026 12	Forward Madison FC	3–1	New York Cosmos	Madison, Wisconsin
7:00 PM CDT	K. Carmichael (yellow card) 17'; R. Carmichael 25' (Torres); Torres 28'; Toure (yellow card) 38'; Castro 48', (yellow card) 56'; Karamoko (yellow card) 85'	Report	Spengler (yellow card) 73'; Guenzatti 76' (Zielonka); Chavez (yellow card) 85'	Stadium: Breese Stevens Field; Attendance: 3,449; Referee: Cristian Campo

July 1, 2026 13	Spokane Velocity FC	0–1	Forward Madison FC	Spokane, Washington
7:00 PM PDT	Covi (yellow card) 85'	Report	Segbers (yellow card) 2'; Margvelashvili 31' (o.g.); Edwards (yellow card) 72'; Karamoko (yellow card) 85'; Annor Gyamfi (yellow card) 90+3'	Stadium: One Spokane Stadium; Attendance: 1,748; Referee: Justin St. Pierre

July 4, 2026	Forward Madison FC	v	South Georgia Tormenta FC	Madison, Wisconsin
6:30 PM CDT				Stadium: Breese Stevens Field
Note: Game cancelled following South Georgia Tormenta FC's withdrawal from USL League One.

July 15, 2026 14	Forward Madison FC	4–0	Richmond Kickers	Madison, Wisconsin
7:00 PM CDT	Toure 30', 45+4' (Kanyane); R. Carmichael 60' (Torres); Annor Gyamfi (yellow card) 63', (goal) 65' (R. Carmichael)	Report	Fillion (yellow card) 19'; Barnathan (yellow card) 42'; O'Malley (yellow card) 43'; Pannholzer (yellow card) 45+2'; Anderson (yellow card) 46'; Howell (yellow card) 82'	Stadium: Breese Stevens Field; Attendance: 3,341; Referee: Laadi Issaka

July 25, 2026 15	Forward Madison FC	3–1	FC Naples	Madison, Wisconsin
6:00 PM CDT	Karamoko 28' (Kanyane); Toure (yellow card) 42'; Edwards (yellow card) 70'; Bolma 74'; Torres (yellow card) 79'; R. Carmichael 90+4'	Report	Mesias 80' (pen.)	Stadium: Breese Stevens Field; Attendance: 3,956; Referee: Calin Radosav

July 29, 2026 16	Forward Madison FC	5–2	Chattanooga Red Wolves SC	Madison, Wisconsin
7:00 PM CDT	R. Carmichael 7' (K. Carmichael), 44' (Torres), 62' (pen.); Toure 35' (Bolma); Torres 65' (Karamoko); Harms (yellow card) 90+3'; N'goubou (yellow card) 90+3'; Segbers (yellow card) 90+3'	Report	Adewole 14' (Wessels); Bentley 32' (O. Hernandez); Wessels (yellow card) 56'; Ramos (yellow card) 72'; Lombardi (yellow card) 90+2'	Stadium: Breese Stevens Field; Attendance: 3,297; Referee: Igor Bych

August 1, 2026 17	Forward Madison FC	2–0	Westchester SC	Madison, Wisconsin
7:00 PM CDT	Karamoko 32' (Munjoma); K. Carmichael (yellow card) 47'; McCamy (yellow card) 52'; Torres (yellow card) 55'; Edwards (yellow card) 73'; Annor Gyamfi 86' (Edwards)	Report	Pierre (yellow card) 8' (yellow-red card) 19'	Stadium: Breese Stevens Field; Attendance: 3,488; Referee: Esad Omanovic

August 8, 2026 18	Athletic Club Boise	2–1	Forward Madison FC	Garden City, Idaho
7:30 PM MDT	Mayaka 45+5' (Barea), (yellow card) 90+5'; Barea (yellow card) 45+9'; Bodily (yellow card) 78', (goal) 87' (Amang); Kostyshyn (yellow card) 90'; Amang (yellow card) 90+1'	Report	Munjoma (yellow card) 31'; Edwards 83' (N'goubou); Toure (yellow card) 90+3' (red card) 90+3'	Stadium: Stadium at Expo Idaho; Attendance: 7,201; Referee: John Matto

August 12, 2026 19	Forward Madison FC	1–1	Greenville Triumph SC	Madison, Wisconsin
7:00 PM CDT	Karamoko 44' (Torres); Castro (yellow card) 57'	Report	Nour 27', (yellow card) 28'; Fricke (yellow card) 40'; Bubb (yellow card) 46'; Evans (yellow card) 74'	Stadium: Breese Stevens Field; Attendance: 3,805; Referee: Stephen Foster

August 16, 2026 20	Portland Hearts of Pine	1–2	Forward Madison FC	Portland, Maine
6:30 PM EDT	Wright (yellow card) 4'; Kidd (yellow card) 10'; Felipe (yellow card) 71'; Kamara (red card) 81'; Gonzalez	Report	Karamoko 21' (Bolma); Shannon (yellow card) 35'; R. Carmichael 57'; Annor Gyamfi (yellow card) 85'; Toure (yellow card) 90+3'	Stadium: Fitzpatrick Stadium; Attendance: 6,256; Referee: Drew Klemp

August 22, 2026 21	Forward Madison FC	1–1	Charlotte Independence	Madison, Wisconsin
7:00 PM CDT	R. Carmichael 58' (Annor Gyamfi); N'goubou (yellow card) 67'; Toure (yellow card) 82'; Munjoma (yellow card) 90+1'	Report	Skinner 11' (Manin); Manzinga (yellow card) 90+3'	Stadium: Breese Stevens Field; Attendance: 4,486; Referee: Jaclyn Metz

August 29, 2026 22	Richmond Kickers	1–2	Forward Madison FC	Richmond, Virginia
7:00 PM EDT	Freeman (yellow card) 64'; Anderson (yellow card) 90+1' (red card) 90+3'; Kirkland 90+6' (Pannholzer)	Report	Torres 2' (Bolma), (yellow card) 26'; Kanyane (yellow card) 12'; Munjoma 58' (Torres); N'goubou (yellow card) 90+1'	Stadium: City Stadium; Attendance: 4,520; Referee: Erick Lezama

September 2, 2026 23	Forward Madison FC	1–1	One Knoxville SC	Madison, Wisconsin
7:00 PM CDT	Segbers (yellow card) 45+1'; Garibay 89' (o.g.); Toure (yellow card) 90+7'	Report	McRobb (yellow card) 45+2'; Conway; Perkins (yellow card) 76'; Baker (yellow card) 80'	Stadium: Breese Stevens Field; Attendance: 3,106; Referee: Edson Carvajal

September 5, 2026 24	Corpus Christi FC	0–2	Forward Madison FC	Corpus Christi, Texas
7:30 PM CDT	Booth (yellow card) 53'; Johnson (yellow card) 64'; Keaney (yellow card) 66'; Keegan (yellow card) 90+1'; Gomez (red card) 90+6'	Report	Torres (yellow card) 1'; Edwards (yellow card) 23'; N'goubou 61'; R. Carmichael 67' (pen.); Goumballe (yellow card) 80'	Stadium: Cabaniss Athletic Complex; Attendance: 1,159; Referee: Edgar García

September 12, 2026 25	Forward Madison FC	1–1	Sarasota Paradise	Madison, Wisconsin
5:00 PM CDT	N'goubou 54' (Kanyane); Bolma (yellow card) 58'; Torres (yellow card) 64'	Report	Kiingi (yellow card) 18'; Krueger 39' (Bolanos); Bolanos (yellow card) 44'; Sögaard (yellow card) 90+3'	Stadium: Breese Stevens Field; Attendance: 4,012; Referee: Izlen Peksenar

September 16, 2026 26	Chattanooga Red Wolves SC	1–0	Forward Madison FC	East Ridge, Tennessee
7:00 PM EDT	O. Hernandez 6' (Lelin); Knapp (yellow card) 36'; Lelin (yellow card) 45+5'; Kinzner (yellow card) 50'; Vaughan (yellow card) 63'; Ayimbila (yellow card) 90+6'	Report	Forbes (yellow card) 28'; Edwards (yellow card) 60'	Stadium: CHI Memorial Stadium; Attendance: 1,173; Referee: Mario Maric

September 19, 2026 27	Forward Madison FC	3–0	AV Alta FC	Madison, Wisconsin
6:00 PM CDT	Munjoma (yellow card) 16', (goal) 20' (R. Carmichael); K. Carmichael (yellow card) 19'; Shannon (yellow card) 42'; R. Carmichael 84' (Torres); Edwards (yellow card) 90+3'; Bolma 90+7' (Augee)	Report	Alassane (yellow card) 12'; Thomas (yellow card) 28'; Lay (yellow card) 37'; Acuna (yellow card) 44'; Jahng (red card) 80'	Stadium: Breese Stevens Field; Attendance: 3,631; Referee: Justin St. Pierre

September 26, 2026 28	Forward Madison FC	0–1	Spokane Velocity FC	Madison, Wisconsin
5:00 PM CDT	McCamy (yellow card) 48'; R. Carmichael (yellow card) 83'	Report	Peláez (yellow card) 57'; Denton 73' (Opara); Spielman (yellow card) 83'	Stadium: Breese Stevens Field; Attendance: 4,235; Referee: Jorge Escobar

October 3, 2026 29	Fort Wayne FC	0–0	Forward Madison FC	Fort Wayne, Indiana
7:30 PM EDT	Neidlinger (yellow card) 70'; Becher (yellow card) 88'	Report	Torres (yellow card) 16'; Edwards (yellow card) 80'	Stadium: Ruoff Mortgage Stadium; Attendance: 3,849; Referee: Muhammad Kaleia

October 10, 2026 30	Westchester SC	3–2	Forward Madison FC	Mount Vernon, New York
7:00 PM EDT	Blommestijn 13' (Evans), 45+3' (Burko), (yellow card) 64'; Elias 72' (Evans)	Report	Kanyane (yellow card) 23'; Toure (yellow card) 24'; Bolma 55'; Humphrey (yellow card) 83'; Edwards (yellow card) 85'; Karamoko 90+6'	Stadium: The Stadium at Memorial Field; Attendance: 2,056; Referee: Joe Surgan

October 17, 2026 31	Forward Madison FC	2–0	Portland Hearts of Pine	Madison, Wisconsin
5:00 PM CDT	R. Carmichael 5', 40' (pen.)	Report	Poon-Angeron (yellow card) 16'; Drack (yellow card) 39'; Faye (yellow card) 60'	Stadium: Breese Stevens Field; Attendance: 4,820; Referee: Christopher Calderon

October 24, 2026 32	Forward Madison FC	0–0	Union Omaha	Madison, Wisconsin
5:00 PM CDT	Torres (yellow card) 37'	Report	Guediri (yellow card) 31'; Klein (yellow card) 46'; Gutierrez (yellow card) 54'	Stadium: Breese Stevens Field; Attendance: 4,324; Referee: Carlos Rodriguez

==== USL League One Playoffs ====
Quarterfinals; October 30—November 1
1	Charlotte Independence	5
8	FC Naples	1
4	Forward Madison FC	2
5	Spokane Velocity FC	1
2	Union Omaha	1 (4)
7	Chattanooga Red Wolves SC	1 (5)
3	Athletic Club Boise	2
6	One Knoxville SC	0

Semifinals; November 7—8
1	Charlotte Independence	2
4	Forward Madison FC	1
7	Chattanooga Red Wolves SC	0
3	Athletic Club Boise	1

Final; November 14
1	Charlotte Independence	4
3	Athletic Club Boise	2

Forward Madison entered the 2026 USL League One Playoffs as the fourth seed.

October 30, 2024 Quarterfinals	Forward Madison FC	2–1	Spokane Velocity FC	Madison, Wisconsin
6:30 PM CDT	Karamoko 7' (R. Carmichael); Bolma 12' (R. Carmichael); McCamy (yellow card) 48'; Torres (yellow card) 80'; Munjoma (yellow card) 88'	Report	Opara 11' (Vinyals); A. Lewis (yellow card) 30'; Elmasnaouy (yellow card) 45+1'	Stadium: Breese Stevens Field; Attendance: 3,192; Referee: Alexandra Billeter; Assistant referees: Art Arustamyan, Jake Brochu; Fourth official: Lauren Aldrich

November 8, 2024 Semifinals	Charlotte Independence	2–1	Forward Madison FC	Charlotte, North Carolina
7:00 PM EST	Bakero 9'; Coulibaly; Manin (yellow card) 70'; Dimick (yellow card) 90+4'	Report	Karamoko 11' (R. Carmichael); Annor Gyamfi (yellow card) 80'	Stadium: American Legion Memorial Stadium; Attendance: 2,189; Referee: Elvis Osmanovic; Assistant referees: Alexander Arita, Race Williams; Fourth official: Amin Hadzic

=== U.S. Open Cup ===
As a returning member of USL League One, Forward Madison FC participated in the 2026 U.S. Open Cup.

March 19, 2026 First round	Flint City Bucks (Michigan)	2–0	(Wisconsin) Forward Madison FC	Grand Blanc, Michigan
6:30 PM EDT	Gyamfi 13' (o.g.); Carnevale (yellow card) 45+3'; Lopez 67' (Roman); Kamara (yellow card) 74'; Spadafora (yellow card) 90+2'	Report	Edwards (yellow card) 42'; Humphrey (yellow card) 90+2' (red card) 90+2'	Stadium: Don Batchelor Stadium; Attendance: 3,027; Referee: Quinton McFarlen

=== Prinx Tires USL Cup ===
==== Standings — Group 4 ====
Pos	Lg	Team	Pld	W	PKW	PKL	L	GF	GA	GD	Pts	Qualification
1	USLC	Louisville City FC	4	3	1	0	0	12	4	+8	11	Advance to knockout stage
2	USLC	Detroit City FC	4	2	0	2	0	4	2	+2	8	
3	USLC	Indy Eleven	4	1	2	0	1	5	4	+1	7	
4	USL1	Union Omaha	4	2	0	0	2	10	12	−2	6	
5	USLC	Lexington SC	4	1	1	1	1	7	7	0	6	
6	USL1	Forward Madison FC	4	1	0	0	3	6	10	−4	3	
7	USL1	Fort Wayne FC	4	0	0	1	3	6	11	−5	1	

Rules for classification: 1) points; 2) goals for in cup match play (only for determining wild card); 3) head-to-head points earned in small group play; 4) total wins in small group play; 5) total wins in all cup matches; 6) goals for in small group play; 7) goals for in cup match play; 8) goals assisted in cup match play; 9) goal differential in cup match play; 10) disciplinary points; 11) coin toss.

==== Results summary ====
Overall									Home							Away						
Pld	W	SOW	SOL	L	GF	GA	GD	Pts	W	SOW	SOL	L	GF	GA	GD	W	SOW	SOL	L	GF	GA	GD
4	1	0	0	3	6	10	−4	3	1	0	0	1	4	4	0	0	0	0	2	2	6	−4

Source: USL League One

==== Group stage matches ====
April 25, 2026 1	Lexington SC	4–2	Forward Madison FC	Lexington, Kentucky
7:00 PM EDT	Goodrum (yellow card) 22', (goal) 90+2' (Epps); Burks (yellow card) 35'; Zengue 39' (Epps); Greene 63'; Epps 68' (Ferri)	Report	Edwards 45+1' (McCamy); Zengue 70' (o.g.)	Stadium: Lexington SC Stadium; Attendance: 4,209; Referee: Jorge Escobar

May 16, 2026 2	Forward Madison FC	0–1	Detroit City FC	Madison, Wisconsin
5:00 PM CDT	Torres (yellow card) 13'; Munjoma (yellow card) 18'; Kanyane (yellow card) 69'; Annor Gyamfi (yellow card) 70'; Machasen (red card) 77'	Report	Silva (yellow card) 42'; Yamazaki (yellow card) 48', (goal) 88' (Amoo-Mensah); Diop (yellow card) 57'	Stadium: Breese Stevens Field; Attendance: 4,178; Referee: Robert Vincze

June 6, 2026 3	Indy Eleven	2–0	Forward Madison FC	Indianapolis, Indiana
7:00 PM EDT	Quinn (yellow card) 21'; Craig 48' (Rendón); O'Brien 54', (yellow card) 68'	Report	Torres (yellow card) 12'; Shannon (yellow card) 47'; Kanyane (yellow card) 50'; Toure (yellow card) 58'	Stadium: Carroll Stadium; Attendance: 8,586; Referee: Muhammad Kaleia

July 11, 2026 4	Forward Madison FC	4–3	Union Omaha	Madison, Wisconsin
7:00 PM CDT	Bolma 31'; R. Carmichael 35' (K. Carmichael), 63' (Torres); Segbers (yellow card) 41'; Forbes (yellow card) 45+2'; Castro (yellow card) 77'; Karamoko 90+6', (yellow card) 90+7'	Report	Gómez; Cáceres (yellow card) 36'; Boudadi (yellow card) 47'; Owusu (yellow card) 70'; Ors Navarro 79' (Gavilanes); Wootton (yellow card) 90+2'	Stadium: Breese Stevens Field; Attendance: 3,573; Referee: Elton García

== Statistics ==
All statistics as of October 30, 2026.

=== Appearances and goals ===
No.	Pos.	Nat.	Name	USL1 Season			USL1 Playoffs			U.S. Open Cup			USL Cup			Total		
No.	Pos.	Nat.	Name	Apps	Starts	Goals	Apps	Starts	Goals	Apps	Starts	Goals	Apps	Starts	Goals	Apps	Starts	Goals
1	GK	(United States)	JT Harms	31	31	0	2	2	0	0	0	0	3	3	0	36	36	0
3	DF	(United States)	AJ Edwards	23	10	1	2	0	0	1	1	0	2	1	1	28	12	2
4	DF	(United States)	Collin McCamy	31	25	0	2	2	0	1	0	0	4	2	0	38	29	0
5	DF	(United States)	Jaylen Shannon	24	15	0	1	0	0	1	1	0	3	2	0	29	18	0
6	DF	(South Africa)	Geni Kanyane	27	25	1	2	2	0	1	1	0	4	3	0	34	31	1
7	MF	(Ghana)	Joshua Bolma (Note: Joined Forward Madison FC after the team was eliminated from the 2026 U.S. Open Cup.)	29	19	5	2	2	1				4	2	1	35	23	7
8	MF	(United States)	Mark Segbers	23	16	0	2	2	0	0	0	0	2	2	0	27	20	0
9	FW	(Northern Ireland)	Ryan Carmichael	32	28	14	2	2	0	1	1	0	4	4	2	39	35	16
11	FW	(Ivory Coast)	Claudel N'goubou	30	13	3	2	0	0	1	1	0	3	2	0	36	16	3
12	MF	(United States)	Roman Torres	30	28	4	2	2	0	1	0	0	4	4	0	37	34	4
13	DF	(United States)	Turner Humphrey	9	8	2	1	0	0	1	1	0	2	2	0	13	11	2
14	FW	(Ghana)	Stephen Annor Gyamfi	31	20	6	2	0	0	1	1	0	4	3	0	38	24	6
16	MF	(United States)	Jackson Castro	20	13	1	1	0	0	0	0	0	4	2	0	25	15	1
17	FW	(United States)	Derek Gebhard	12	12	3	0	0	0	1	0	0	2	1	0	15	13	3
19	GK	(United States)	Tenzing Manske	1	1	0	0	0	0	1	1	0	1	1	0	3	3	0
20	DF	(United States)	Kevin Carmichael	32	32	0	2	2	0	0	0	0	3	3	0	37	37	0
21	FW	(United States)	Hakim Karamoko	18	6	6	2	2	2				2	1	1	22	9	9
23	DF	(United States)	Eddie Munjoma	32	23	2	2	2	0	1	0	0	4	2	0	39	27	2
24	DF	(United States)	Jahlane Forbes	13	4	0	0	0	0				1	1	0	14	5	0
27	FW	(United States)	Herbert Endeley	0	0	0	0	0	0				0	0	0	0	0	0
28	DF	(United States)	Joe Hildal	0	0	0	0	0	0				0	0	0	0	0	0
30	MF	(Panama)	Enrique Machasen	10	2	0	0	0	0	1	1	0	2	0	0	13	3	0
33	DF	(Canada)	Kerfalla Toure	23	19	4	2	2	0	1	1	0	3	2	0	29	24	4
38	FW	(United States)	Maouloane Goumballe (Note: Joined Forward Madison FC after the team was eliminated from the 2026 USL Cup.)	3	0	0	0	0	0							3	0	0
57	MF	(United States)	Ben Augee	11	1	0	1	0	0							12	1	0
99	GK	(United States)	Kevin Flores	0	0	0	0	0	0	0	0	0	0	0	0	0	0	0
Players who left Forward Madison FC during the season
18	MF	(United States)	Kage Romanshyn Jr. (Note: Left Forward Madison FC before the team began play in the 2026 USL League One Playoffs.)	6	1	0				1	1	0	3	1	0	10	3	0
25	FW	(United States)	Tyler Trimnal (Note: Left Forward Madison FC before the team began play in the 2026 USL Cup.)	1	0	0				1	0	0				2	0	0

=== Goalscorers ===
Rank	Position	Name	USL1 Season	USL1 Playoffs	U.S. Open Cup	USL Cup	Total
1	FW	(Northern Ireland) Ryan Carmichael	14	0	0	2	16
2	FW	(United States) Hakim Karamoko	6	2	0	1	9
3	MF	(Ghana) Joshua Bolma	5	1	0	1	7
4	FW	(Ghana) Stephen Annor Gyamfi	6	0	0	0	6
5	MF	(United States) Roman Torres	4	0	0	0	4
5	DF	(Canada) Kerfalla Toure	4	0	0	0	4
7	FW	(United States) Derek Gebhard	3	0	0	0	3
7	FW	(Ivory Coast) Claudel N'goubou	3	0	0	0	3
9	DF	(United States) AJ Edwards	1	0	0	1	2
9	DF	(United States) Turner Humphrey	2	0	0	0	2
9	DF	(United States) Eddie Munjoma	2	0	0	0	2
12	MF	(United States) Jackson Castro	1	0	0	0	1
12	DF	(South Africa) Geni Kanyane	1	0	0	0	1
Own goal			2	0	0	1	3
Total			54	3	0	6	63

=== Assist scorers ===
Rank	Position	Name	USL1 Season	USL1 Playoffs	U.S. Open Cup	USL Cup	Total
1	MF	(United States) Roman Torres	9	0	0	1	10
2	FW	(Northern Ireland) Ryan Carmichael	3	3	0	0	6
3	MF	(Ghana) Joshua Bolma	4	0	0	0	4
3	DF	(South Africa) Geni Kanyane	4	0	0	0	4
5	FW	(Ivory Coast) Claudel N'goubou	3	0	0	0	3
6	FW	(Ghana) Stephen Annor Gyamfi	2	0	0	0	2
6	DF	(United States) Kevin Carmichael	1	0	0	1	2
6	MF	(United States) Jackson Castro	2	0	0	0	2
6	DF	(United States) Collin McCamy	1	0	0	1	2
6	DF	(United States) Eddie Munjoma	2	0	0	0	2
11	MF	(United States) Ben Augee	1	0	0	0	1
11	DF	(United States) AJ Edwards	1	0	0	0	1
11	FW	(United States) Hakim Karamoko	1	0	0	0	1
11	MF	(Panama) Enrique Machasen	1	0	0	0	1
Total			35	3	0	3	41

=== Clean sheets ===
Rank	Name	USL1 Season	USL1 Playoffs	U.S. Open Cup	USL Cup	Total
1	(United States) JT Harms	10	0	0	0	10
Total		10	0	0	0	10

=== Disciplinary record ===
Rank	Position	Name	USL1 Season				USL1 Playoffs				U.S. Open Cup				USL Cup				Total			
Rank	Position	Name	Yellow card	(yellow card) (yellow-red card)	Red card	(yellow card) (red card)	Yellow card	(yellow card) (yellow-red card)	Red card	(yellow card) (red card)	Yellow card	(yellow card) (yellow-red card)	Red card	(yellow card) (red card)	Yellow card	(yellow card) (yellow-red card)	Red card	(yellow card) (red card)	Yellow card	(yellow card) (yellow-red card)	Red card	(yellow card) (red card)
1	MF	(United States) Roman Torres	12	1	0	0	1	0	0	0	0	0	0	0	2	0	0	0	15	1	0	0
2	DF	(Canada) Kerfalla Toure	8	0	0	1	0	0	0	0	0	0	0	0	1	0	0	0	9	0	0	1
3	DF	(United States) AJ Edwards	10	0	0	0	0	0	0	0	1	0	0	0	0	0	0	0	11	0	0	0
4	DF	(South Africa) Geni Kanyane	4	0	1	0	0	0	0	0	0	0	0	0	2	0	0	0	6	0	1	0
5	DF	(United States) Eddie Munjoma	6	0	0	0	1	0	0	0	0	0	0	0	1	0	0	0	8	0	0	0
6	DF	(United States) Kevin Carmichael	7	0	0	0	0	0	0	0	0	0	0	0	0	0	0	0	7	0	0	0
6	MF	(United States) Mark Segbers	6	0	0	0	0	0	0	0	0	0	0	0	1	0	0	0	7	0	0	0
8	FW	(Ghana) Stephen Annor Gyamfi	4	0	0	0	1	0	0	0	0	0	0	0	1	0	0	0	6	0	0	0
9	DF	(United States) Turner Humphrey	0	0	0	0	0	0	0	0	0	0	0	1	0	0	0	0	0	0	0	1
9	MF	(Panama) Enrique Machasen	1	0	0	0	0	0	0	0	0	0	0	0	0	0	1	0	1	0	1	0
11	MF	(United States) Jackson Castro	3	0	0	0	0	0	0	0	0	0	0	0	1	0	0	0	4	0	0	0
11	FW	(Ivory Coast) Claudel N'goubou	4	0	0	0	0	0	0	0	0	0	0	0	0	0	0	0	4	0	0	0
11	DF	(United States) Jaylen Shannon	3	0	0	0	0	0	0	0	0	0	0	0	1	0	0	0	4	0	0	0
14	FW	(United States) Hakim Karamoko	2	0	0	0	0	0	0	0	0	0	0	0	1	0	0	0	3	0	0	0
14	DF	(United States) Collin McCamy	2	0	0	0	1	0	0	0	0	0	0	0	0	0	0	0	3	0	0	0
16	MF	(Ghana) Joshua Bolma	2	0	0	0	0	0	0	0	0	0	0	0	0	0	0	0	2	0	0	0
16	GK	(United States) JT Harms	2	0	0	0	0	0	0	0	0	0	0	0	0	0	0	0	2	0	0	0
16	DF	(United States) Jahlane Forbes	1	0	0	0	0	0	0	0	0	0	0	0	1	0	0	0	2	0	0	0
19	FW	(Northern Ireland) Ryan Carmichael	1	0	0	0	0	0	0	0	0	0	0	0	0	0	0	0	1	0	0	0
19	FW	(United States) Derek Gebhard	1	0	0	0	0	0	0	0	0	0	0	0	0	0	0	0	1	0	0	0
19	FW	(United States) Maouloane Goumballe	1	0	0	0	0	0	0	0	0	0	0	0	0	0	0	0	1	0	0	0
Total			80	1	1	1	4	0	0	0	1	0	0	1	12	0	1	0	97	1	2	2

== Honors and awards ==
=== USL League One Yearly Awards ===
==== Individual awards ====
Award	Finish	Player	Ref.
Goalkeeper of the Year	Finalist	(United States) JT Harms	

==== USL League One All-League Teams ====
Team	Position	Player	Ref.
First	FW	(Northern Ireland) Ryan Carmichael	
Second	GK	(United States) JT Harms	
Second	MF	(United States) Roman Torres	

==== USL Player's Association Player's Choice Best XI ====
Position	Player	Ref.
FW	(Northern Ireland) Ryan Carmichael	

=== USL League One Monthly Awards ===
==== Coach of the Month ====
Month	Coach	Ref.
March	(United States) Matt Glaeser	
July	(United States) Matt Glaeser	

=== USL League One Weekly Awards ===
==== Player of the Week ====
Week	Position	Player	Ref.
2	MF	(United States) Roman Torres	
13	MF	(Ivory Coast) Claudel N'goubou	
19/20	DF	(Canada) Kerfalla Toure	
22	FW	(Northern Ireland) Ryan Carmichael	

==== Save of the Week ====
Week	Player	Opponent	Ref.
8/9	(United States) JT Harms	Sarasota Paradise	
23	(United States) JT Harms	Athletic Club Boise	
24	(United States) JT Harms	Greenville Triumph SC	

==== Team of the Week ====
Bold denotes Player of the Week.

Week	Position	Player	Ref.
2	Coach	(United States) Matt Glaeser	
2	DF	(United States) Turner Humphrey	
2	MF	(United States) **Roman Torres**	
2	Bench	(South Africa) Geni Kanyane	
4	GK	(United States) JT Harms	
4	MF	(United States) Roman Torres	
8/9	DF	(United States) Turner Humphrey	
13	DF	(United States) Derek Gebhard	
13	MF	(Ivory Coast) **Claudel N'goubou**	
14/15	FW	(Ivory Coast) Claudel N'goubou	
14/15	MF	(United States) Roman Torres	
14/15	Bench	(United States) Collin McCamy	
14/15	Bench	(Canada) Kerfalla Toure	
16	Bench	(United States) Jackson Castro	
16	Bench	(United States) Roman Torres	
17/18	GK	(United States) JT Harms	
19/20	FW	(Northern Ireland) Ryan Carmichael	
19/20	DF	(Canada) **Kerfalla Toure**	
19/20	Bench	(United States) Roman Torres	
21	FW	(Ghana) Joshua Bolma	
22	FW	(Northern Ireland) **Ryan Carmichael**	
22	Coach	(United States) Matt Glaeser	
22	MF	(United States) Roman Torres	
24	MF	(United States) Roman Torres	
25	MF	(United States) Roman Torres	
26	GK	(United States) JT Harms	
26	MF	(United States) Roman Torres	
26	Bench	(United States) Eddie Munjoma	
27	FW	(Northern Ireland) Ryan Carmichael	
27	Bench	(United States) JT Harms	
27	Bench	(Ivory Coast) Claudel N'goubou	
28	Bench	(United States) Roman Torres	
29	FW	(Northern Ireland) Ryan Carmichael	
29	Bench	(Ghana) Joshua Bolma	
31	MF	(United States) Roman Torres	
33	Bench	(United States) Kevin Carmichael	
33	Bench	(Northern Ireland) Ryan Carmichael	
33	Bench	(United States) Eddie Munjoma	
33	Bench	(United States) Roman Torres	
34	DF	(Canada) Kerfalla Toure	

=== Prinx Tires USL Cup Awards ===
==== Team of the Round ====
Round	Position	Player	Ref.
3	Bench	(United States) Tenzing Manske	
4	Bench	(Northern Ireland) Ryan Carmichael	
