= Kevin O'Connor (footballer, born 1995) =

Irish footballer (born 1995)

Personal information
- Full name: Kevin Patrick O'Connor
- Date of birth: 7 May 1995 (age 31)
- Place of birth: Enniscorthy, Ireland
- Height: 1.83 m (6 ft 0 in)
- Positions: Left back; midfielder

Team information
- Current team: FC Naples
- Number: 14

Youth career
- St Patrick's Athletic

Senior career*
Years	Team	Apps	(Gls)
2013–2014	Waterford	43	(3)
2015–2017	Cork City	69	(3)
2017–2020	Preston North End	8	(0)
2018	→ Fleetwood Town (loan)	4	(0)
2018	→ Crewe Alexandra (loan)	6	(0)
2019	→ Cork City (loan)	18	(1)
2020	→ Waterford (loan)	4	(1)
2020	Cork City	13	(0)
2021	Shelbourne	25	(1)
2022	Cork City	28	(2)
2024	FC Motown	0	(0)
2025–	FC Naples	61	(3)

International career^{‡}
2011–2012	Republic of Ireland U17	3	(0)
2016–2017	Republic of Ireland U21	4	(0)
- * Club domestic league appearances and goals as of 14:46, 24 October 2026 (UTC) ‡ National team caps and goals as of 10:14, 19 October 2017 (UTC)

Kevin Patrick O'Connor (born 7 May 1995) is an Irish professional footballer who plays as a midfielder and full back for FC Naples in the USL League One.

== Club career ==
=== Republic of Ireland ===
Born in 1995, O'Connor began his career with Waterford United in 2013. In his second season with the club, he scored twice, once in a 3–1 victory against Wexford and another goal in a 1–1 draw against Galway. After trialling with English Championship club Bournemouth, he signed for League of Ireland club Cork City on 28 April 2015. On 31 August 2015, he scored his debut goal for the club in a 3–1 victory over St Patrick's Athletic. On 22 July 2016, he scored the lone goal in a 1–0 victory over Swedish club Häcken in the UEFA Europa League. He volleyed a free kick of Greg Bolger, which entered the goal following a deflection from Häcken defender Emil Wahlstrom. On 6 December 2016, he renewed his contract with the club for the 2017 League of Ireland Premier Division season.

=== England ===
On 30 June 2017, O'Connor signed for English Championship club Preston North End on a three-year deal for an undisclosed fee. On 8 August, he made his debut for the club, featuring in a 3–2 defeat against League Two club Accrington Stanley in the EFL Cup. He made his league debut in a 2–0 defeat against Aston Villa in November. He received praise of club manager Alex Neil for his performance.

In 2018, O'Connor had a loan spell at Fleetwood Town, making five first team appearances. In August 2018, he was signed on loan by Crewe Alexandra until January 2019, making his Crewe debut in a 3–0 home win over Macclesfield Town.

=== United States ===
After taking a year out of the game O'Connor moved to the United States and made 1 appearance for FC Motown on 22 March 2024 in a U.S. Open Cup defeat to New York City FC II. On 13 December 2024, it was announced that O'Connor would join third-tier US side FC Naples ahead of their inaugural season in the USL League One in 2025.

== Style of play ==
Cork City manager John Caulfield has described O'Connor as a "strong, quick, left-footed" player. O'Connor has said that although he is a full back, he prefers playing as an attacking full-back.

== Personal ==
O'Connor won €1,000,000 in the Irish National Lottery's 2017 Christmas Millionaire Raffle, with a ticket bought as a Christmas present by his uncle.

== Career statistics ==
=== Club ===
As of match played on 28 September 2025

Appearances and goals by club, season and competition
Club	Season	League			National Cup (Note: Includes FAI Cup, FA Cup & U.S. Open Cup)		League Cup (Note: Includes League of Ireland Cup, EFL Cup & USL Cup)		Continental		Other		Total	
Club	Season	Division	Apps	Goals	Apps	Goals	Apps	Goals	Apps	Goals	Apps	Goals	Apps	Goals
Waterford	2013	LOI First Division	21	1	0	0	1	0	—		—		22	1
Waterford	2014	LOI First Division	22	2	0	0	1	0	—		—		23	1
Waterford	Total		43	3	0	0	2	0	—		—		45	2
Cork City	2015	LOI Premier Division	21	1	3	0	1	0	2 (Note: Appearances in UEFA Europa League)	0	—		27	1
Cork City	2016	LOI Premier Division	28	1	3	0	2	0	6	1	—		39	2
Cork City	2017	LOI Premier Division	20	1	0	0	0	0	4	0	1 (Note: Appearance in President of Ireland's Cup)	0	25	1
Cork City	Total		69	3	6	0	3	0	12	1	1	0	91	4
Preston North End	2017–18	Championship	8	0	0	0	1	0	—		—		9	0
Fleetwood Town (loan)	2017–18	League One	4	0	0	0	0	0	—		1 (Note: Appearances in EFL Cup)	0	5	0
Crewe Alexandra (loan)	2018–19	League Two	6	0	1	0	0	0	—		3	0	10	0
Cork City (loan)	2019	LOI Premier Division	18	1	1	0	1	0	1	0	2 (Note: 1 appearance, 1 goal in President of Ireland's Cup & 1 appearance in Munster Senior Cup)	1	23	2
Waterford (loan)	2020	LOI Premier Division	4	1	—		—		—		—		4	1
Cork City	2020	LOI Premier Division	13	0	2	0	—		—		0	0	15	0
Shelbourne	2021	LOI First Division	25	1	1	0	—		—		—		26	1
Cork City	2022	LOI First Division	28	2	2	0	—		—		0	0	30	2
FC Motown	2024	National Premier Soccer League	0	0	1	0	—		—		—		1	0
FC Naples	2025	USL League One	29	1	3	1	3	1	—		2	0	37	3
FC Naples	2027	USL League One	32	2	3	0	4	0	—		0	0	39	2
Career total			279	14	19	1	14	1	13	1	9	1	316	18
