= Hal Uderitz =

American soccer player (born 1999)

Personal information
- Date of birth: September 16, 1999 (age 27)
- Place of birth: Kansas City, Missouri, United States
- Height: 1.91 m (6 ft 3 in)
- Positions: Defender; midfielder

Youth career
- 2016–2018: Crossfire Premier

College career
Years	Team	Apps	(Gls)
2018–2021	Seattle Redhawks	69	(13)

Senior career*
Years	Team	Apps	(Gls)
2019	Crossfire Redmond	10	(1)
2022–2023	Tacoma Defiance	43	(6)
2024	Colorado Rapids 2	1	(0)
2025	Sporting Kansas City II	6	(1)
- * Club domestic league appearances and goals as of December 14, 2025

Hal Uderitz (born September 16, 1999) is an American soccer player who plays as a midfielder.

== Career ==
=== Youth ===
Born in Kansas City, Missouri, He is the son of Scott Uderitz, a former MLS player.

Uderitz grew up in Snohomish, Washington, and played for the state championship-winning Snohomish High School team in 2015. He also played club soccer for Crossfire Premier, making the final eight in the USSDA playoffs in 2017.

=== College ===
In 2018, Uderitz attended Seattle University to play college soccer. In four seasons with the Redhawks, Uderitz made 69 appearances, scoring 13 goals and tallying eight assists. He earned honors including WAC All-Freshman Team in 2018, and WAC All-Tournament Team and All-Far West Region Second Team in 2021.

While at college, Uderitz also played with Crossfire Redmond in the National Premier Soccer League during their 2019 season.

=== Professional ===
On January 11, 2022, Uderitz was selected 76th overall in the 2022 MLS SuperDraft by Seattle Sounders FC. On March 18, 2022, it was announced that Uderitz had signed with Seattle's MLS Next Pro side Tacoma Defiance ahead of their 2022 season. During the 2022 season, he made 19 appearances and scored two goals.
