= Luca Mastrantonio =

Italian footballer (born 1996)

Personal information
- Date of birth: 27 May 1996 (age 30)
- Place of birth: Rome, Italy
- Height: 1.88 m (6 ft 2 in)
- Position: Defender

Team information
- Current team: FC Naples

College career
Years	Team	Apps	(Gls)
2016	UNOH Racers	23	(7)
2017	Rockhurst Hawks	21	(0)
2019	UC Irvine Anteaters	17	(0)

Senior career*
Years	Team	Apps	(Gls)
2015–2016	Ostia Mare	28	(0)
2017–2018	Thunder Bay Chill	27	(2)
2021–2022	FC Tucson	46	(4)
2023–2024	Union Omaha	58	(1)
2025	AV Alta	20	(2)
2026–	FC Naples	28	(2)
- * Club domestic league appearances and goals as of October 31, 2026

Luca Mastrantonio (born 27 May 1996) is an Italian professional footballer who plays as a defender for FC Naples in USL League One.

== Career ==
=== Ostia Mare ===
Mastrantonio played a single season for Serie D side Ostia Mare, making 28 appearances.

=== College & Thunder Bay Chill ===
In 2016, Mastrantonio moved to the United States to play college soccer at the University of Northwestern Ohio, where he scored 7 goals and tallied 3 assists in 23 appearances for the Racers. The following year, he transferred to Rockhurst University in Kansas City, Missouri, making 21 appearances. For the NCAA Division II college, he helped lead the team to become Conference regular season and tournament champions with a 12-1-1 record, and was named to the NCAA Division II All-Tournament Team and All-Midwest Region.

In 2017, Mastrantonio appeared in the USL PDL for Thunder Bay Chill. In 2018, Mastrantonio didn't play a college season, but spent another season in the PDL with Thunder Bay, making 14 appearances.

Mastrantonio returned to play college soccer in 2019 at the University of California, Irvine, where he played 17 games and was named to the All-Big West First Team. He didn't play in 2020 due to the Big West season been cancelled due to the COVID-19 pandemic.

=== FC Tucson ===
On 1 March 2021, Mastrantonio signed with FC Tucson of USL League One. He made his debut on 19 June 2021, appearing as an injury-time substitute during a 0–0 draw with North Texas SC.

=== Union Omaha ===
Following Tucson's voluntary relegation to USL League Two, Mastrantonio signed with USL League One club Union Omaha in January 2023. During his time with Omaha, Mastrantonio helped the club to two consecutive first place finishes and the 2024 USL League Championship.

=== AV Alta FC ===
Mastrantonio joined AV Alta on 1 January 2025, ahead of the club's inaugural season in USL League One.

=== FC Naples ===
On 5 January 2026, Mastrantonio signed for FC Naples.
