= Gio Miglietti =

American soccer player (born 1999)

Personal information
- Full name: Raul Giovanni Miglietti
- Date of birth: September 5, 1999 (age 27)
- Place of birth: Hawthorne, California
- Height: 6 ft 1 in (1.85 m)
- Positions: Forward; midfielder

Team information
- Current team: FC Naples
- Number: 9

Youth career
- –2017: Pateadores SC
- 2017–2018: Seattle Sounders FC

College career
Years	Team	Apps	(Gls)
2018–2022	Washington Huskies	79	(19)

Senior career*
Years	Team	Apps	(Gls)
2018	Seattle Sounders 2	7	(0)
2023–2024	Tacoma Defiance	42	(12)
2025	Huntsville City FC	17	(0)
2026–	FC Naples	28	(5)
- * Club domestic league appearances and goals as of November 1, 2026

Raul Giovanni "Gio" Miglietti (born September 5, 1999) is an American professional soccer player who plays for USL League One club FC Naples.

== Career ==
Miglietti attended El Segundo High School in El Segundo, California. Miglietti has played within the academies of Seattle Sounders FC and Pateadores SC. In 2018, he played for the USL Championship team Seattle Sounders FC 2, starting in 4 of the 7 matches he appeared in that season. Following the end of the 2018 USLC season, he joined the Huskies men's soccer team at the University of Washington.

After finishing his college career in 2022, Miglietti signed with Tacoma Defiance (the rebranded Sounders FC 2) on January 26, 2023.
