= Omar Ciss =

Senegalese footballer

Personal information
- Date of birth: August 4, 2001 (age 25)
- Place of birth: Dakar, Senegal
- Height: 5 ft 11 in (1.80 m)
- Position: Midfielder

Team information
- Current team: FC Naples
- Number: 6

Youth career
- 2017–2020: Montverde Academy

Senior career*
Years	Team	Apps	(Gls)
2020–2021	Austin Bold	38	(0)
2022–2025	Charlotte Independence	111	(9)
2026–	FC Naples	17	(1)
- * Club domestic league appearances and goals as of October 31, 2026

Omar Ciss (born 4 August 2001) is a Senegalese footballer who currently plays for FC Naples in the USL League One.

== Career ==
=== Montverde Academy ===
Ciss was part of the Florida-based Montverde Academy.

=== Austin Bold ===
On 21 April 2020, Ciss signed for USL Championship team Austin Bold. He made his debut on 17 July 2020, starting in a 3-1 loss to OKC Energy.

=== Charlotte Independence ===
On 5 April 2022, Ciss joined Charlotte Independence in the USL League One, signing a one-year contract.
