= Jaylen Yearwood =

Trinidadian footballer (born 2004)

Personal information
- Date of birth: 27 August 2004 (age 22)
- Place of birth: Conyers, Georgia, US
- Height: 6 ft 0 in (1.83 m)
- Position: Defender

Team information
- Current team: FC Naples
- Number: 37

Youth career
- 2018–2022: Gwinnett Soccer Academy

College career
Years	Team	Apps	(Gls)
2022–2025	North Florida Ospreys	60	(1)

Senior career*
Years	Team	Apps	(Gls)
2024–2025	East Atlanta FC	7	(0)
2026	Orlando City B	10	(0)
2026–	FC Naples	19	(0)

International career^{‡}
2026–	Trinidad and Tobago	2	(0)
- * Club domestic league appearances and goals as of 02:36, 30 October 2026 (UTC) ‡ National team caps and goals as of 05:51, 11 July 2026 (UTC)

Jaylen Yearwood (born 27 August 2004) is a professional footballer who plays as an defender for USL League One club FC Naples. Born in the United States, he plays for the Trinidad and Tobago national team.

== Early career ==
Yearwood played youth soccer with Gwinnett Soccer Academy, where he was a 4-year varsity starter. In college, he played for the North Florida Ospreys, where he won two ASUN men's soccer tournaments was named 2025 ASUN Defensive Player of the Year in his senior year.

== Club career ==
Yearwood played seven games with USL League Two club East Atlanta FC during 2024.

On 18 December 2025, Yearwood was drafted 14th overall by Orlando City for the 2026 MLS SuperDraft. On 27 February 2026, Yearwood signed with their MLS Next Pro affiliate, Orlando City B, through the 2026 season.

Yearwood signed with USL League One club FC Naples on 5 June 2026. The following day, Yearwood made his debut when he started for FC Naples in a USL Cup game, which they lost 3–0 to Sarasota Paradise.

== International career ==
Born in the United States, Yearwood is of Trinidadian descent through his father. He was called up to the Trinidad and Tobago national team for a set of 2026 FIFA Series matches in March 2026.

== Career statistics ==
=== Club ===
As of match played 1 November 2026

Appearances and goals by club, season and competition
Club	Season	League			U.S. Open Cup		Playoffs		Other		Total	
Club	Season	Division	Apps	Goals	Apps	Goals	Apps	Goals	Apps	Goals	Apps	Goals
East Atlanta FC	2024	USL League Two	7	0	—		—		—		7	0
Orlando City B	2026	MLS Next Pro	10	0	—		—		—		10	0
FC Naples	2026	USL League One	19	0	—		1	0	2 (Note: Appearances in USL Cup)	0	22	0
Career total			36	0	0	0	1	0	2	0	39	0

=== International ===
As of match played 30 May 2026

Appearances and goals by national team and year
National team	Year	Apps	Goals
Trinidad and Tobago	2026	2	0
Total		2	0

== Honours ==
North Florida Ospreys

- ASUN men's soccer tournament: 2024, 2025

Individual

- 2025 ASUN Defensive Player of the Year
