= FC Naples =

Naples
- Full name: Football Club Naples
- Short name: FCN
- Founded: January 2024; 2 years ago
- Stadium: Paradise Coast Sports Complex Stadium
- Capacity: 5,000
- CEO: Roberto Moreno
- Head Coach: Zak Gordon (interim)
- League: USL League One
- 2025: USL League One, 4th of 14; Playoffs: Semi-finals
- Website: fcnaples.com
Home colors	Away colors

FC Naples is a professional American soccer club based in Naples, Florida. Founded in January 2024, the club began play in 2025, as part of USL League One, the third tier of the American soccer pyramid. Their home stadium is at the Paradise Coast Sports Complex in Collier County, Florida.

The club is the first professional soccer club in Southwest Florida. La Barra 239 is the supporters' group.

== History ==
The club's official name, crest, and branding were revealed on June 15, 2024. Roberto Moreno is the club president and co-founder. Formerly a CFO of the fitness and apparel brand Zumba, Moreno first became a minority stake investor for EFL League One Leyton Orient in April 2021. In January 2022 he invested in Belgian lower side Patro Eisden, and Bundesliga 2 club Preussen Munster the following year. Moreno considered buying the Tampa Bay Rowdies. Although a deal never happened, he formed a connection with USL deputy CEO Justin Papadakis. After Papadakis made a trip to Naples and visited the Paradise Coast Sports Complex, he was convinced of a new location for a new USL franchise.

Nico Cantor is also a part owner of the club. He contributes to CBS Sports' UEFA Champions League and Europa League coverage and hosts The Golazo! Show. On July 17, 2024, FC Naples announced Matt Poland as their first head coach. First round of tryouts were held on September 7, 2024. Naples have won the Battle for Paradise with Sarasota Paradise and the Derby of the Gulf with Tampa Bay Rowdies.

== Inaugural season ==
FC Naples started off their inaugural 2025 season by a 1-1 draw with the Chattanooga Red Wolves, with the team's first ever goal being scored by Andres Ferrin. Following this, the team collected wins against Forward Madison FC, Spokane Velocity and Texoma FC. However, they were eliminated from the U.S. Open Cup on penalies against the Tampa Bay Rowdies and suffered their first league defeat against One Knoxville SC. They did recover from this earning a 1-0 victory over USL Championship side Charleston Battery in their first ever USL Cup match, with a goal from Karsen Henderlong. They finished their inaugural regular season in 4th place out of 14 teams, qualifying for the playoffs. They ended up losing in the USL League One semifinals to eventual champions One Knoxville SC.

== Stadium ==
Built in 2020, Paradise Coast Sports Complex Stadium serves as the club's current home, and holds up to 5,000 spectators. The field surface is synthetic turf.

== Identity ==
On February 19, 2024, FC Naples announced a fan outreach initiative in which it would seek input on club branding from local residents.

The club's badge is meant to be representative of Naples as a whole, and the city's defining relationship with the sea. Itself in the shape of a lightning whelk, it is adorned in gold with of shapes of a boat keel at its bottom and an art deco shell crown pattern at its top. The 'A' in the 'FC Naples' wordmark is stylized in the shape of pier pilings.

The club's signature shade of deep blue is representative of the waters along which the city of Naples is located. The club announced that Hummel International will be their kit supplier. Physicians Regional Healthcare System is their primary kit sponsor, along with paradisecoast.com as their back sponsor, PFS Wealth Management as their sleeve sponsor and Tide Cleaners as their short sponsor.

== Current roster ==
As of June 5, 2026

Note: Flags indicate national team as defined under FIFA eligibility rules; some limited exceptions apply. Players may hold more than one non-FIFA nationality.

No.	Pos.	Nation	Player
1	GK	USA	Edward Delgado
2	DF	USA	Jaden Strumier
3	DF	USA	Julian Cisneros
4	DF	USA	Hal Uderitz
5	DF	ITA	Luca Mastrantonio
6	MF	SEN	Omar Ciss
7	FW	USA	Taylor Gray
8	MF	USA	Juan Osorio
9	FW	USA	Gio Miglietti
10	MF	COL	Andrés Ferrín
11	FW	USA	Christopher Garcia
12	DF	HAI	Hudson Gay
14	MF	IRL	Kevin O'Connor

No.	Pos.	Nation	Player
16	MF	USA	Alexander Bulai-Tudor
17	GK	USA	Tony Halterman
18	FW	USA	Dominick Bachstein
19	MF	COL	William Arevalo
21	MF	ESP	Marc Torrellas
22	DF	USA	Joshua Yoder
23	MF	ENG	Aiden Mesias
30	MF	USA	Ian Cerro
31	DF	USA	Tristen Rose
34	GK	IRL	Luca Fitzgerald
37	DF	TTO	Jaylen Yearwood
45	FW	RSA	Nicolas Likulia
99	GK	JAM	Joshua Grant
