= Paradise Coast Sports Complex =

Sports facility in Collier County, Florida, U.S.

- Interactive map of Paradise Coast Sports Complex
- Address: 3940 City Gate Blvd N, Naples, Florida, United States 34117
- Location: Collier County, Florida, U.S.
- Coordinates: 26.164715°N 81.673358°W
- Operator: Sports Force Parks
- Facilities: Paradise Coast Sports Complex Stadium
- Acreage: 145 Acres

Construction
- Built: 2017–2020 (first phase)
- Cost: USD$114 million
- Architect: Coastal Vista
- General contractor: Sports Facilities Companies

Tenants
- FC Naples (USL1) (2025–present); Naples United FC (NPSL)

Website
- playparadisecoast.com

The Paradise Coast Sports Complex is a sports complex located in Collier County, Florida, United States. The complex contains facilities for an extensive lists of sports, including American football and lacrosse. The complex is anchored by the Paradise Coast Sports Complex Stadium, where professional soccer club FC Naples of the USL League One plays their matches.

The complex originated from a desire for regions to capitalize on the sports tourism emerging market, where it has been praised as a prime example for future sports complexes.

== History ==
Planning for the sports complex first came in 2016, with construction on the first phase of the complex beginning in 2017. Funding for the complex came from Collier County tourism tax dollars, with a cost of $80 million to open the first phase of the complex. The complex first opened up in July 2020.

Additions continued to occur at the sports complex throughout the 2020s in a sporadic manner, with the construction of additional sports facilities held up due to lack of public funds and construction disputes, with Phase 2 completing in 2023. Despite the delay of the opening of sports facilities, the sports complex saw growth in usage in profit, bringing in $1.67 million in profit in 2024.

In July 2025, following the passing of a controversial proposal to bring baseball and softball facilities to the complex, which approval to consider construction of, alongside future phases of the park, passed by the slim margin in county legislation 3–2, a feasibility study on the ability of the sports complex to host bat-and-ball sports was conducted. The estimated costs of completing phases 3 and 4, which would construct five softball fields and six baseball fields, would cost upwards of $49 million.

== Facilities ==
The complex sports nineteen synthetic turf fields that can be used for sports such as soccer and lacrosse, plus eight synthetic turf baseball fields. In addition, the complex hosts an indoor field house for basketball and volleyball. In addition to the complex's sports facilities, bars are present on the campus. An auditorium with a video board is also located on campus, which hosts concerts amongst other events.

The sports complex has been hosts to national sporting events at the complex. The first major event at the stadium was the Top Gun Showcase, an annual invite-only football skills showcase that has become an annual event at Paradise Coast Sports Complex.USA Field Hockey has previously held the National 2024 Hockey Festival at the complex.

=== Paradise Coast Sports Complex Stadium ===
The main facility at the Paradise Coast Sports Complex is its 3,500-seat stadium. Home of FC Naples, a member of third division league USL League One, and semi-professional club Naples United FC of the National Premier Soccer League, the stadium has a beer garden, premium seating options, and a forty-foot video board screen. In addition to soccer, the stadium has the ability to host football and lacrosse.
