= Christopher Garcia =

American soccer player (born 2003)

Personal information
- Date of birth: January 13, 2003 (age 23)
- Place of birth: El Paso, Texas, United States
- Height: 5 ft 7 in (1.70 m)
- Position: Winger

Team information
- Current team: FC Naples
- Number: 11

Youth career
- 2018–2020: Real Salt Lake

Senior career*
Years	Team	Apps	(Gls)
2020–2022	Real Salt Lake	3	(0)
2021–2022	Real Monarchs	13	(1)
2021	→ Ljungskile SK (loan)	5	(1)
2022	→ El Paso Locomotive (loan)	6	(0)
2023	El Paso Locomotive	17	(1)
2024	→ Austin FC II (loan)	8	(0)
2025	Forward Madison	24	(1)
2026–	FC Naples	26	(5)
- * Club domestic league appearances and goals as of October 31, 2026

Christopher Garcia (born January 13, 2003) is an American professional soccer player who plays as a winger for USL League One team FC Naples.

== Career ==
Garcia grew up in El Paso, Texas before moving to Utah where he joined the Real Salt Lake academy in 2018. He scored 18 goals in 38 appearances for the USSDA side.

=== Real Salt Lake ===
On February 10, 2020, Garcia signed with the Real Salt Lake first team on a homegrown player contract. Garcia made his professional debut on September 19, 2020, appearing as an injury-time substitute during a 2–1 loss to Vancouver Whitecaps FC.

=== Ljungskile SK ===
On August 10, 2021, Garcia was loaned to Swedish side Ljungskile SK for the remainder of the 2021 season.

=== El Paso Locomotive ===
Garcia was loaned to USL Championship club El Paso Locomotive on September 1, 2022. Following his release from Salt Lake at the end of the 2022 season, Garcia joined El Paso Locomotive on a permanent basis on January 5, 2023.

=== Austin FC II ===
On January 11, 2024, Austin FC II announced they had signed Garcia on a season-long loan from El Paso for the 2024 MLS Next Pro season.

=== Forward Madison ===
Prior to the 2025 season, USL League One club Forward Madison announced they signed Garcia for the upcoming season.

== Personal life ==
Born in the United States, Garcia is of Mexican descent.
