= Ian Cerro =

American soccer player (born 1996)

Personal information
- Date of birth: December 9, 1996 (age 29)
- Place of birth: Florida, United States
- Height: 5 ft 8 in (1.73 m)
- Position: Attacking midfielder

Team information
- Current team: FC Naples
- Number: 30

Youth career
- –2015: Colorado Storm
- 2015–2016: Real Juvencia

College career
| Years | Team | Apps | (Gls) |
| 2016–2017 | SIU Edwardsville Cougars | 7 | (0) |

Senior career*
| Years | Team | Apps | (Gls) |
| 2018 | Colorado Pride Switchbacks U23 | 12 | (1) |
| 2019 | Cañuelas | | |
| 2021 | FC Milwaukee Torrent | 10 | (2) |
| 2021 | Chicago House | 12 | (4) |
| 2022 | Chattanooga FC | 24 | (4) |
| 2023 | Rio Grande Valley FC | 27 | (2) |
| 2024 | Georgia FC | 18 | (0) |
| 2025– | FC Naples | 41 | (2) |
- * Club domestic league appearances and goals as of November 1, 2026

Ian Cerro (born December 9, 1996) is an American professional soccer player who currently plays for FC Naples in the USL League One.

== Career ==
=== Youth and college ===
Cerro was born in Florida, but moved to Aurora, Colorado in 2001. Cerro played soccer at Grandview High School where he was chosen as the Rookie of the Year in the Centennial League as a freshman. Cerro also played club soccer with the Colorado Storm Academy, earning a State Championship in 2013. He later spent a season playing soccer with Spanish Segunda División B side Real Juvencia as well as training in Rosario, Argentina.

In 2017, Cerro returned to the United States to attend Southern Illinois University Edwardsville. He made seven appearances for the Cougars across two seasons, with all the appearances coming in his freshman year. He spent time in 2018 playing with USL PDL side Colorado Pride Switchbacks U23, scoring one goal and tallying one assist in 12 matches.

=== Professional ===
2019 saw Cerro sign his first professional contract with Argentinian Primera C Metropolitana side Cañuelas. He returned to the United States in 2021, playing with National Premier Soccer League side FC Milwaukee Torrent where he was 2021 Midwest Region XI and NPSL National XI. Later in the year, he signed with the National Independent Soccer Association side Chicago House AC. In 2022, he stayed in the NISA with Chattanooga FC, scoring four goals in 24 regular season games.

On January 24, 2023, Cerro signed with USL Championship side Rio Grande Valley FC.

Cerro signed with new National Independent Soccer Association side Georgia FC during their inaugural season.

Cerro was announced a new signing for new USL League One side FC Naples ahead of their debut season in 2025.
