= Ryan Carmichael =

Northern Irish footballer (born 2001)

Personal information
- Full name: Ryan Carmichael
- Date of birth: 3 August 2001 (age 25)
- Place of birth: Madden, County Armagh, Northern Ireland
- Height: 1.80 m (5 ft 11 in)
- Position: Forward

Team information
- Current team: Forward Madison
- Number: 9

College career
Years	Team	Apps	(Gls)
2020–2023	Hofstra Pride	75	(46)

Senior career*
Years	Team	Apps	(Gls)
2018–2020	Portadown	39	(6)
2021	Georgia Revolution		
2022–2023	Long Island Rough Riders	25	(17)
2024	Inter Miami II	25	(9)
2025	Atlanta United 2	28	(1)
2026–	Forward Madison	32	(14)
- * Club domestic league appearances and goals as of 18:08, 31 October 2026 (UTC)

Ryan Carmichael (born 3 August 2001) is a Northern Irish professional footballer who plays as a forward for USL League One club Forward Madison.

== College career ==
In 2020, Carmichael would be given an opportunity of a four-year scholarship to play in the United States of America at an NCAA Division I school, which would be Hofstra University or continue to play in Northern Ireland with Portadown. He would choose to leave Northern Ireland and move to the United States of America to represent Hofstra University and play for Hofstra Pride men's soccer team. Carmichael made 75 appearances and recorded 46 goals and 18 assists for Hofstra University in 4 seasons.

== Club career ==
Carmichael made his professional debut for Portadown in the NIFL Championship in March 2018 against Institute. He made over 60 appearances for the team across all competitions, scoring six league goals.

He also played for National Premier Soccer League side Georgia Revolution in 2021, and later with Long Island Rough Riders as they reached the USL League Two play-offs in 2022.

In December 2023, Ryan Carmichael was one of the four players selected by Inter Miami in the 2024 MLS SuperDraft. He was drafted in the first round (24th overall). Although drafted by Inter Miami, Ryan Carmichael was signed to the reserved team, Inter Miami II for the 2024 season. He made his MLS Next Pro debut with Inter Miami II on 2 April 2024 in a 2–0 win against Orlando City B, he recorded an assist. He scored his debut goal the following match against Huntsville City on 7 April 2024, in a 2–1 win. That goal later earned him MLS Pro Next Goal of Matchweek 4.

Carmichael signed with Atlanta United 2 for the 2025 season.

In December 2025, Forward Madison signed Carmichael for its 2026 season.

== Career statistics ==
As of match played 25 August 2024

Appearances and goals by club, season and competition
Club	Season	League			Playoffs		National cup (Note: Includes Irish Cup)		Other		Total	
Club	Season	Division	Apps	Goals	Apps	Goals	Apps	Goals	Apps	Goals	Apps	Goals
Portadown	2018-2019	NIFL Championship	19	4	8	1	1	1	3 (Note: Appearance(s) in Northern Ireland Football League Cup)	1	31	7
Portadown	2019-2020	NIFL Championship	20	2	—		—		—		20	2
Total			39	6	8	1	1	1	3	1	51	9
Long Island Rough Riders	2022	USL League Two	14	10	3	3	—		—		17	13
Long Island Rough Riders	2023	USL League Two	11	7	1	0	—		—		12	8
Long Island Rough Riders	Total		25	17	4	3	0	0	0	0	29	21
Inter Miami II	2024	MLS Next Pro	19	7	0	0	—		—		19	7
Career total			83	29	12	4	1	1	3	1	99	35
