= Joshua Bolma =

Ghanaian footballer (born 2002)

Josh Bolma
Personal information
- Full name: Joshua Bolma
- Date of birth: 10 April 2002 (age 24)
- Place of birth: Accra, Ghana
- Height: 1.75 m (5 ft 9 in)
- Position: Midfielder

Team information
- Current team: Forward Madison
- Number: 7

Youth career
- –2017: Rising Stars Academy
- 2017–2021: Black Rock FC

College career
Years	Team	Apps	(Gls)
2021–2022	Maryland Terrapins	38	(6)

Senior career*
Years	Team	Apps	(Gls)
2021	Ocean City Nor'easters	1	(0)
2022	Westchester Flames	7	(3)
2023–2024	New England Revolution	1	(0)
2023–2024	New England Revolution II	43	(3)
2025	Houston Dynamo 2	18	(2)
2026–	Forward Madison	29	(5)
- * Club domestic league appearances and goals as of October 31, 2026

Joshua Bolma (born 10 April 2002) is a Ghanaian footballer who currently plays for USL League One club Forward Madison FC.

== Early life ==
Bolma was born in Accra, Ghana. He moved from Ghana to the United States after graduating from the Rising Stars of Africa Academy in Ghana and was awarded a scholarship to attend the South Kent High School in Connecticut. He attended the University of Maryland where he played soccer for the Maryland Terrapins and was the Big Ten Freshman of the Year in 2021 and earned First Team All-Big Ten honors as both a freshman and sophomore. He was also only the fourth player in Maryland history to earn multiple first-team All-Big Ten honors.

== Career ==
Entering the 2023 MLS SuperDraft, New England Revolution had the tenth overall pick. However they traded up with the San Jose Earthquakes to take Bolma as the 4th pick overall in the draft. They gave San Jose their No. 10 overall pick, $200,000 in 2023 General Allocation Money (GAM) and $50k GAM in 2024. Bolma signed on to a Generation Adidas contract and New England head coach Bruce Arena was quoted as saying “Josh Bolma is a really good, quick attacking player. He can play a number of positions and we are going to try him as a No. 8 in the center midfield.”

Bolma made his MLS debut on July 15, 2023, as a 64th-minute substitute in the Revolution's 4–0 win over D.C. United in front of a crowd of 29,884 at Gillette Stadium.

New England declined Bolma's contract option following their 2024 season.
