= 2026 Detroit City FC season =

American soccer team season

Detroit City FC
2026 season
- CEO: Sean Mann
- Manager: Danny Dichio
- Stadium: Keyworth Stadium; Hamtramck, Michigan
- USL Championship: 3rd (Eastern Conference); 4th (Overall)
- USL Championship Playoffs: Conference Quarterfinals
- U.S. Open Cup: Round of 32
- USL Cup: Group Stage
- Top goalscorer: League: 14 goals: Darren Smith; All: 16 goals: Darren Smith
- Highest home attendance: 7,387 vs Rhode Island FC (October 10)
- Lowest home attendance: 5,053 vs Miami FC (May 20)
- Average home league attendance: 6,251
- Biggest win: 2-6 at Sporting JAX (June 13)
- Biggest defeat: 2-0 at Charleston Battery (May 30)
Home colors	Away colors

The 2026 Detroit City FC season was the club's eighth professional season since the club was established in 2012, and the team's fifth season in the USL Championship.

== Kits ==
Home	Away	Pride for Ruth Ellis Center	Charity for Capuchin Soup Kitchen

== Roster ==
Final 2026 roster

Note: Flags indicate national team as defined under FIFA eligibility rules; some limited exceptions apply. Players may hold more than one non-FIFA nationality.

No.	Pos.	Nation	Player
1	GK	MEX	Carlos Herrera
2	DF	USA	Rhys Williams
3	DF	USA	Aedan Stanley
4	DF	CAN	Callum Montgomery
6	MF	ENG	Ryan Williams
7	FW	RSA	Darren Smith
8	MF	SEN	Abdoulaye Diop
9	FW	ENG	Ben Morris
10	FW	ECU	Jeciel Cedeño
11	FW	USA	Connor Rutz
12	MF	USA	Michael Bryant
14	MF	JPN	Haruki Yamazaki
15	FW	USA	Alex Dalou
16	GK	ZIM	Tatenda Mkuruva
17	MF	BRA	Rafael Mentzingen
18	FW	CMR	Tabort Etaka Preston
19	FW	SEN	Cheikhou Niang (on loan from FC Cincinnati 2)
20	DF	USA	Rio Hope-Gund
21	MF	USA	Maxi Rodriguez
22	MF	USA	Kobe Hernandez-Foster
23	FW	ENG	Kian Williams (on loan from Indy Eleven)
26	FW	NGR	Chisom Egbuchulam
30	DF	USA	Devon Amoo-Mensah
32	FW	SEN	Ates Diouf
33	DF	USA	Tommy Silva
66	MF	PLE	Bilal Obeid
91	GK	MEX	Carlos Saldaña

1. USL Academy Contract

== Coaching staff ==
Technical staff
Head Coach	(England) Danny Dichio
Assistant Coach	(Canada) Phillip Dos Santos
Sports Performance Coach	(United States) Elisa Baeron
Goalkeeper Coach	(United States) Emerson Lovato

== Transfers ==
For transfers in, dates listed are when Detroit City FC officially signed the players to the roster. Transactions where only the rights to the players are acquired are not listed. For transfers out, dates listed are when Detroit City FC officially removed the players from its roster, not when they signed with another club. If a player later signed with another club, his new club will be noted, but the date listed here remains the one when he was officially removed from the Detroit City FC roster.

=== In ===
No.	Pos.	Player	Transferred from	Fee/notes	Date	Source
32	FW	(Senegal) Ates Diouf	(United States) Lexington SC	Undisclosed	December 5, 2025	
3	DF	(United States) Aedan Stanley	(United States) Indy Eleven		December 16, 2025	
15	FW	(United States) Alex Dalou	(United States) FC Tulsa		December 18, 2025	
19	DF	(United States) Rio Hope-Gund	(United States) Rhode Island FC		December 18, 2025	
21	MF	(United States) Maxi Rodriguez	(United States) Rhode Island FC	Undisclosed	December 19, 2025	
33	DF	(United States) Tommy Silva	(United States) Real Salt Lake		January 22, 2026	
4	DF	(Canada) Callum Montgomery	(Canada) Cavalry FC		February 3, 2026	
26	FW	(Nigeria) Chisom Egbuchulam	(Saudi Arabia) Al-Jandal SC		February 20, 2026	
18	FW	(Cameroon) Tabort Etaka Preston	(United States) Birmingham Legion FC		February 23, 2026	
17	FW	(Brazil) Rafael Mentzingen	(United States) North Carolina FC		April 1, 2026	
23	FW	(England) Kian Williams	(United States) Indy Eleven	Loan	August 21, 2026	
19	FW	(Senegal) Cheikhou Niang	(United States) FC Cincinnati 2	Loan	September 10, 2026	

=== Out ===
No.	Pos.	Player	Transferred to	Fee/notes	Date	Source

== Competitions ==
=== Preseason and friendlies ===
Detroit City announced their preseason schedule on January 28, 2026.

February 4	Detroit City FC	2–2	Sporting JAX	Bradenton, FL
1 PM EST	Hernandez-Foster (1st half); Diop (2nd half)	Report		Stadium: IMG Academy

February 7	Detroit City FC	0–1	FC Cincinnati	Clearwater, FL
12 PM EST		Report	Denkey 38' (pen.)	Stadium: Walter Campbell Sports Park

February 11	Detroit City FC	1–1	FC Naples	Sarasota, FL
2 PM EST	Diop (1st half)	Report

February 18	Detroit City FC	Cancelled	Oakland Golden Grizzlies	Auburn Hills, MI
1 PM EST				Stadium: Oakland University

February 21	Detroit City FC	2–0	Toronto FC II	Canton, MI
9 PM EST	Smith (1st half); Cedeño (2nd half)	Report

February 28	Detroit City FC	4–0	Western Michigan Broncos	Detroit, MI
2 PM EST	Smith (1st half); Cedeño (1st half); Diouf (1st half) (2nd half)	Report		Stadium: Wayne State University

March 7	Detroit City FC	1–3	Forward Madison FC	Kalamazoo, MI
2 PM EST	Rodriguez (2nd half)	Report		Stadium: WMU Soccer Complex

=== USL Championship ===
==== Eastern Conference ====
Pos	Team	Pld	W	L	T	GF	GA	GD	Pts	Qualification
1	Tampa Bay Rowdies (S)	30	18	5	7	52	26	+26	61	Playoffs
2	Charleston Battery	30	16	9	5	56	35	+21	53	Playoffs
3	Detroit City FC	30	14	7	9	34	21	+13	51	Playoffs
4	Louisville City FC	30	13	9	8	51	43	+8	47	Playoffs
5	Pittsburgh Riverhounds SC	30	13	11	6	33	30	+3	45	Playoffs

Updated to match(es) played on October 24, 2026. Source: USL Championship Standings
Rules for classification: 1) total wins against conference opponents; 2) goal differential against conference opponents; 3) goals scored against conference opponents; 4) head-to-head points against conference opponents; 5) points per game against conference opponents; 6) points per game against non-conference opponents; 7) fewest disciplinary points; 8) coin toss or drawing of lots
(S) Players' Shield winner

Overall								Home						Away					
Pld	W	D	L	GF	GA	GD	Pts	W	D	L	GF	GA	GD	W	D	L	GF	GA	GD
30	14	9	7	34	21	+13	51	10	4	1	17	5	+12	4	5	6	17	16	+1

Last updated: October 25, 2026.
Source: Match reports

==== Matches ====
On December 16, 2025, the USL Championship released the schedule for all 25 teams for both the regular season and the Prinx Tires USL Cup.

March 14 1	Detroit City FC	3–0	Brooklyn FC	Hamtramck, MI
4:00 PM EDT	Smith 3' 32'; Egbuchulam 85'; Dalou (yellow card) 90+2'	Report	Vancaeyezeele (yellow card) 45+2'; Servania (yellow card) 52'	Stadium: Keyworth Stadium; Attendance: 5,559; Referee: Rodrigo Albuquerque

March 21 2	Indy Eleven	2–1	Detroit City FC	Indianapolis, IN
7:00 PM EDT	Sing 43'; Rendón 62'; Mitrano (yellow card) 77'	Report	Smith 56'	Stadium: Michael A. Carroll Stadium; Attendance: 9,357; Referee: Matthew Corrigan

March 28 3	Detroit City FC	1–0	Charleston Battery	Hamtramck, MI
4:00 PM EDT	Diouf (yellow card) 63'; Smith 75'	Report	Berry (yellow card) 20'; Akpunonu (yellow card) 86'	Stadium: Keyworth Stadium; Attendance: 5,419; Referee: Muhammad Hassan

April 4 4	Rhode Island FC	0–0	Detroit City FC	Pawtucket, RI
4:00 PM EDT	Williams (yellow card) 13'	Report	Diouf (yellow card) 54'; Diop (yellow card) 61'	Stadium: Centreville Bank Stadium; Attendance: 6,590; Referee: John Griggs

April 11 5	Detroit City FC	1–0	Sporting JAX	Hamtramck, MI
4:00 PM EDT	Smith 6'; Rutz (yellow card) 90'	Report	Jääskeläinen (yellow card) 29'; Edwards (yellow card) 42'; Neville (yellow card) 65'	Stadium: Keyworth Stadium; Attendance: 5,379; Referee: Elvis Osmanovic

April 18 6	Pittsburgh Riverhounds	2–1	Detroit City FC	Pittsburgh, PA
7:00 PM EDT	Dikwa 2' 83'; Mertz (yellow card) 6'; Walti (yellow card) 44'; Ahl (yellow card) 76'; Campuzano (yellow card) 90'	Report	Egbuchulam 90+2'; Smith (yellow card) 90+3'	Stadium: Highmark Stadium; Attendance: 3,946; Referee: Elton García

May 2 7	Detroit City FC	2–1	Louisville City FC	Hamtramck, MI
6:00 PM EDT	Moguel 38' (o.g.); Egbuchulam (yellow card) 43'; Diop (yellow card) 51'; Rutz 71'	Report	Adams (yellow card) 39'; Wilson 45+2'; Donovan (yellow card) 49'	Stadium: Keyworth Stadium; Attendance: 6,110; Referee: Matthew Thompson

May 9 8	Hartford Athletic	2–1	Detroit City FC	Hartford, CT
7:00 PM EDT	Anderson (yellow card) 7'; Makangila (yellow card) 36'; Rodriguez 59' (o.g.); Diz Pe 89'	Report	Silva (yellow card) 38'; Diop (yellow card) 63'; Diouf (yellow card) 75'; Diz Pe 84' (o.g.)	Stadium: Trinity Health Stadium; Attendance: 1,148; Referee: Nabil Bensalah

May 20 9	Detroit City FC	2–1	Miami FC	Hamtramck, MI
8:00 PM EDT	Diop (red card) 28'; Rodriguez (yellow card) 44'; Diouf 46'; Saldaña (yellow card) 57'; Smith 84'	Report	Locadia (yellow card) 23'; Ndiaye (yellow card) 40'; Calfo (yellow card) 64'; Musto 76' (yellow card) 78'; Diallo (yellow card) 90+2'; Díaz (yellow card) 90+5'	Stadium: Keyworth Stadium; Attendance: 5,053; Referee: Alyssa Pennington

May 23 10	Loudoun United	0–0	Detroit City FC	Leesburg, VA
6:00 PM EDT	Mazzaferro (yellow card) 21'; Souper (yellow card) 56'; Aman (yellow card) 58'; Niyongabire (yellow card) 59'; Adnan (yellow card) 84'; Bandré (yellow card) 86'	Report	Montgomery (yellow card) 52'; Dalou (yellow card) 68'	Stadium: Segra Field; Attendance: 957; Referee: Drew Klemp

May 30 11	Charleston Battery	2–0	Detroit City FC	Mount Pleasant, SC
6:00 PM EDT	Swan 14'; Blackstock 16'; Berry (yellow card) 35'; Blackstock (yellow card) 45+1'; Ycaza (yellow card) 49'; Martínez (yellow card) 70'; Pakhomov (yellow card) 90+4'	Report	Ry. Williams (yellow card) 24'; Montgomery (yellow card) 75'	Stadium: Patriots Point Soccer Complex; Referee: Jeremy Scheer

June 10 12	Detroit City FC	1–1	El Paso Locomotive FC	Hamtramck, MI
8:51 PM EDT	Yamazaki (yellow card) 6'; Stanley (yellow card) 30'; Diop 49'	Report	Moreno 42'; Méndez (yellow card) 44'; Calvillo (yellow card) 69'	Stadium: Keyworth Stadium; Attendance: 6,103; Referee: Abdou Ndiaye

June 13 13	Sporting JAX	2–6	Detroit City FC	Jacksonville, FL
9:10 PM EDT	Jääskeläinen 9'; Rito (yellow card) 45'; Kuzain (yellow card) 65'; Sadlier 69'; Gomez (yellow card) 90+1'	Report	Smith 13' 26' 45+3' 57' 81'; Diouf (yellow card) 48'; Amoo-Mensah (yellow card) 56'; Rutz (yellow card) 84'; Hernandez-Foster 90+2'	Stadium: Hodges Stadium; Attendance: 450; Referee: Jorge Escobar

July 2 14	Birmingham Legion	1–2	Detroit City FC	Birmingham, AL
8:00 PM EDT	Pasher 24' (pen.); Antwi (yellow card) 37'; Tregarthen (yellow card) 52'; Brown (yellow card) 84'; Saucedo (yellow card) 90+9'	Report	Hope-Gund 2'; Silva (yellow card) 31'; Hernandez-Foster (yellow card) 45+6'; Stanley (yellow card) 88'; Morris 90+2'	Stadium: Protective Stadium; Attendance: 3,615; Referee: Kalilou Jarju

July 18 15	Detroit City FC	2–0	Indy Eleven	Hamtramck, MI
7:00 PM EDT	Rodriguez (yellow card) 11' (goal) 52'; Yamazaki (yellow card) 35'; Mentzingen 47'; Diouf (yellow card) 55'	Report	Rasheed (yellow card) 83'; Rendón (yellow card) 87'; Lindley (yellow card) 89'; Mitrano (yellow card) 90+3'	Stadium: Keyworth Stadium; Attendance: 6,509; Referee: Joshua Encarnación

July 25 16	Detroit City FC	0–1	Las Vegas Lights FC	Hamtramck, MI
7:00 PM EDT	Diop (yellow card) 45+2'; Amoo-Mensah (yellow card) 88'	Report	Anderson 1'; Pinzón (yellow card) 42'; Locker (yellow card) 46'; Anderson (yellow card) 52'; Probo (yellow card) 71'; Leal (yellow card) 88'	Stadium: Keyworth Stadium; Attendance: 7,252; Referee: Muhammad Hassan

August 1 17	Miami FC	2–2	Detroit City FC	Miami, FL
8:28 PM EDT	Rocha (yellow card) 43'; Calfo (yellow card) 44'; Locadia 55' (yellow card) 62'; Díaz 64'; Milanés (yellow card) 87'; Knutson (yellow card) 90+4'	Report	Yamazaki (yellow card) 26'; Rodriguez 34' (yellow card) 70'; Hernandez-Foster (yellow card) 54'; Stanley (yellow card) 66'; Silva 89'	Stadium: Pitbull Stadium; Attendance: 656; Referee: Rodrigo Albuquerque

August 8 18	FC Tulsa	0–1	Detroit City FC	Tulsa, OK
8:30 PM EDT	Stauffer (yellow card) 4'; Batista (yellow card) 48'	Report	Yamazaki (yellow card) 15'; Montgomery (yellow card) 53'; Smith 51'	Stadium: ONEOK Field; Attendance: 3,537; Referee: Servando Berna Rico

August 15 19	Detroit City FC	0–0	Loudoun United	Hamtramck, MI
7:00 PM EDT	Diop (yellow card) 26'; Amoo-Mensah (yellow card) 47'	Report	Niyongabire (yellow card) 81'	Stadium: Keyworth Stadium; Attendance: 7,239; Referee: Muhammad Kaleia

August 22 20	Detroit City FC	1–0	Tampa Bay Rowdies	Hamtramck, MI
7:00 PM EDT	Yamazaki (yellow card) 20'; Diouf 36' (yellow card) 45+2'; Hernandez-Foster (yellow card) 56'	Report	Dossantos (yellow card) 45+5'; Ostrem (yellow card) 58'	Stadium: Keyworth Stadium; Attendance: 7,124; Referee: John Griggs

August 29 21	Louisville City FC	0–0	Detroit City FC	Louisville, KY
8:00 PM EDT	McFadden (yellow card) 20'	Report	Rodriguez (yellow card) 43'; Stanley (yellow card) 89'	Stadium: Lynn Family Stadium; Attendance: 10,082; Referee: Abdou Ndiaye

September 5 22	Detroit City FC	1–1	Hartford Athletic	Hamtramck, MI
7:00 PM EDT	Amoo-Mensah (yellow card) 77'; K. Williams (yellow card) 90+3'; Rodriguez 90+5'	Report	Adedokun (yellow card) 38'; Williams 90+10' (pen.)	Stadium: Keyworth Stadium; Attendance: 6,472; Referee: Elvis Osmanovic

September 12 23	Sacramento Republic FC	1–0	Detroit City FC	Sacramento, CA
10:00 PM EDT	Timmer 14'	Report		Stadium: Heart Health Park; Attendance: 10,005; Referee: Elton García

September 19 24	Detroit City FC	1–0	Pittsburgh Riverhounds	Hamtramck, MI
7:00 PM EDT	Hernandez-Foster (yellow card) 14'; Diouf (yellow card) 67'; K. Williams 73'	Report	Wälti (yellow card) 29'; Souza (yellow card) 45'	Stadium: Keyworth Stadium; Attendance: 5,319; Referee: Matthew Thompson

September 26 25	Detroit City FC	0–0	Colorado Springs Switchbacks	Hamtramck, MI
7:00 PM EDT	Amoo-Mensah (yellow card) 18'; Montgomery (yellow card) 27'	Report	Creek (yellow card) 54'; Perez (yellow card) 56'; Masereka (yellow card) 83'	Stadium: Keyworth Stadium; Attendance: 6,258; Referee: Benjamin Meyer

September 30 26	Brooklyn FC	1–3	Detroit City FC	Brooklyn, NY
7:00 PM EDT	McNamara 70' (pen.)	Report	Ry. Williams (yellow card) 35'; Smith 53'; Bryant (yellow card) 59'; Montgomery 72'; Dalou (yellow card) 84'; Hernandez-Foster 90+3'	Stadium: Maimonides Park; Attendance: 891; Referee: Atahan Yaya

October 3 27	Detroit City FC	1–0	Birmingham Legion FC	Hamtramck, MI
7:00 PM EDT	Hernandez-Foster 22' (pen.); Rodriguez (yellow card) 29'; Dalou (yellow card) 82'; Smith (yellow card) 90+6'	Report	Vassell (yellow card) 58'; Diarbian (yellow card) 75'; McIllhatton (yellow card) 90+1'	Stadium: Keyworth Stadium; Attendance: 6,575; Referee: Matthew Corrigan

October 10 28	Detroit City FC	1–0	Rhode Island FC	Hamtramck, MI
7:00 PM EDT	Herrera (red card) 23'; Smith 56'	Report	Scardina (yellow card) 45+5'; Stoneman (yellow card) 55'; Sanchez (yellow card) 61'; Yao (yellow card) 62'; Herivaux (yellow card) 65'	Stadium: Keyworth Stadium; Attendance: 7,387; Referee: Muhammad Kaleia

October 17 29	Tampa Bay Rowdies	1–0	Detroit City FC	St. Petersburg, FL
7:30 PM EDT	Schneider (yellow card) 19'; Dolabella (yellow card) 26'; Cruz 88'	Report	Dalou (yellow card) 38'; Bryant (yellow card) 51'; Yamazaki (yellow card) 65'; Hernandez-Foster (yellow card) 83'	Stadium: Al Lang Stadium; Attendance: 4,783; Referee: Erick Lezama

October 24 30	Louisville City FC	0–0	Detroit City FC	Louisville, KY
7:00 PM EDT	Niang (yellow card) 31'; Morris (yellow card) 47'; Serrano (yellow card) 88'	Report	Hernandez-Foster (yellow card) 32'; Montgomery (yellow card) 33'	Stadium: Lynn Family Stadium; Attendance: 9,859; Referee: Ekaterina Koroleva

==== Playoffs ====
October 30 Eastern Quarterfinals	Detroit City FC	1–2	Hartford Athletic	Hamtramck, MI
8:00 PM EDT	Hernandez-Foster (red card) 19'; Amoo-Mensah 45'	Report	Anaku 33' 75'	Stadium: Keyworth Stadium; Attendance: 7,027; Referee: Elton García

=== Prinx Tires USL Cup ===
Detroit City was placed into group 4 for the group stage, the only group with seven teams, alongside USL Championship sides Indy Eleven, Lexington and Louisville City, and USL League 1 sides Fort Wayne, Forward Madison, and Union Omaha. They were eliminated on the final day of the group stage despite a 2–1 win against Fort Wayne.

==== Table ====
Pos	Lg	Team	Pld	W	PKW	PKL	L	GF	GA	GD	Pts	Qualification
1	USLC	Louisville City FC	4	3	1	0	0	12	4	+8	11	Advance to knockout stage
2	USLC	Detroit City FC	4	2	0	2	0	4	2	+2	8	
3	USLC	Indy Eleven	4	1	2	0	1	5	4	+1	7	
4	USL1	Union Omaha	4	2	0	0	2	10	12	−2	6	
5	USLC	Lexington SC	4	1	1	1	1	7	7	0	6	
6	USL1	Forward Madison FC	4	1	0	0	3	6	10	−4	3	
7	USL1	Fort Wayne FC	4	0	0	1	3	6	11	−5	1	

==== Matches ====
May 16 Group stage	Forward Madison FC	0–1	Detroit City FC	Madison, WI
6:00 PM EDT	Torres (yellow card) 13'; Munjoma (yellow card) 18'; Kanyane (yellow card) 69'; Annor (yellow card) 70'; Machasen (red card) 77'	Report	Silva (yellow card) 42'; Yamazaki (yellow card) 48'; Diop (yellow card) 57'; Yamazaki 88'	Stadium: Breese Stevens Field; Attendance: 4,178; Referee: Robert Vincze

June 6 Group stage	Detroit City FC	1–1 (1–3 p)	Lexington SC	Hamtramck, MI
4:00 PM EDT	Montgomery 28'; Smith (yellow card) 59'; Amoo-Mensah (yellow card) 68'; Hernandez-Foster (yellow card) 84'	Report	Zengue (yellow card) 15'; Scott (yellow card) 36'; Ferri (yellow card) 51'; Greene (yellow card) 55'; Molloy (yellow card) 84'; Blessing 90+5'	Stadium: Keyworth Stadium; Attendance: 6,356; Referee: Thomas Snyder
	Penalties
	Diop (penalty missed); Tabortetaka (penalty missed); Stanley (penalty missed); Morris (penalty scored)		Molloy (penalty scored); Adedokun (penalty scored); Firmino (penalty missed); Epps (penalty scored)

June 20 Group stage	Detroit City FC	0–0 (3–4 p)	Louisville City FC	Hamtramck, MI
4:00 PM EDT	Silva (yellow card) 39'; Amoo-Mensah (yellow card) 81'	Report	Showunmi (yellow card) 16'; Duncan (yellow card) 51'	Stadium: Keyworth Stadium; Attendance: 7,051; Referee: Matthew Corrigan
	Penalties
	Hernandez-Foster (penalty missed); Morris (penalty scored); Stanley (penalty scored); Rodriguez (penalty missed)		Totsch (penalty scored); Davila (penalty scored); Moguel (penalty scored); Huerman (penalty scored)

July 11 Group stage	Fort Wayne FC	1–2	Detroit City FC	Fort Wayne, IN
7:30 PM EDT	Sproat (yellow card) 53'; Ricol 86'	Report	Diouf (yellow card) 40'; Smith 62'; Mentzingen 71'; Hernandez-Foster (yellow card) 90+2'	Stadium: Fort Wayne FC Park; Attendance: 4,214; Referee: Carlos Rodriguez

=== U.S. Open Cup ===
March 17 First Round	Detroit City FC (Michigan)	5–1	Michigan Rangers FC	Brighton, MI
7:30 PM EDT	Tabortetaka 22' 86'; Rodriguez 56'; Dalou (yellow card) 41' (goal) 65'; Diouf 81'	Report	Barone 6'; Mpomo (yellow card) 90'	Stadium: Legacy Center Sports Complex; Attendance: 675; Referee: Ryan Homik

April 1 Second Round	Flint City Bucks (Michigan)	0–1	(Michigan) Detroit City FC	Grand Blanc, MI
7:30 PM EDT	Carnevale (yellow card) 80'; O'Riordan (yellow card) 90+3'	Report	Hernandez-Foster (yellow card) 3'; Dalou 40'	Stadium: Don Batchelor Field; Attendance: 2,700; Referee: Atahan Yaya

April 14 Round of 32	Detroit City FC (Michigan)	1–2	(Illinois) Chicago Fire FC	Hamtramck, MI
7:30 PM EDT	Smith (yellow card) 38' (goal) 79'; Egbuchulam (yellow card) 90+1'	Report	Pineda (yellow card) 14'; Shokalook 34' 36'; Oregel (yellow card) 60'; Dithejane (red card) 80'; Waterman (yellow card) 86'	Stadium: Keyworth Stadium; Attendance: 6,229; Referee: Abdou Ndiaye

== Statistics ==
No.	Pos	Nat	Player	Total		USL		USL Playoffs		USL Cup		U.S. Open Cup	
No.	Pos	Nat	Player	Apps	Goals	Apps	Goals	Apps	Goals	Apps	Goals	Apps	Goals
Goalkeepers
1	GK	(Mexico) MEX	Carlos Herrera	32	0	27	0	1	0	3	0	1	0
16	GK	(Zimbabwe) ZIM	Tatenda Mkuruva	0	0	0	0	0	0	0	0	0	0
91	GK	(Mexico) MEX	Carlos Saldaña	7	0	4	0	0	0	1	0	2	0
Defenders
2	DF	(United States) USA	Rhys Williams	8	0	4	0	0	0	2	0	2	0
3	DF	(United States) USA	Aedan Stanley	31	0	24	0	1	0	4	0	2	0
4	DF	(Canada) CAN	Callum Montgomery	37	2	30	1	1	0	3	1	3	0
20	DF	(United States) USA	Rio Hope-Gund	19	1	14	1	0	0	2	0	3	0
30	DF	(United States) USA	Devon Amoo-Mensah	37	1	30	0	1	1	3	0	3	0
33	DF	(United States) USA	Tommy Silva	30	1	23	1	0	0	4	0	3	0
Midfielders
6	MF	(England) ENG	Ryan Williams	27	0	22	0	0	0	4	0	1	0
8	MF	(Senegal) SEN	Abdoulaye Diop	36	1	28	1	1	0	4	0	3	0
12	MF	(United States) USA	Michael Bryant	7	0	6	0	1	0	0	0	0	0
14	MF	(Japan) JPN	Haruki Yamazaki	37	1	29	0	1	0	4	1	3	0
17	MF	(Brazil) BRA	Rafael Mentzingen	12	2	9	1	0	0	3	1	0	0
21	MF	(United States) USA	Maxi Rodriguez	30	4	24	3	1	0	3	0	2	1
22	MF	(United States) USA	Kobe Hernandez-Foster	38	3	30	3	1	0	4	0	3	0
Forwards
7	FW	(South Africa) RSA	Darren Smith	32	16	27	14	1	0	3	1	1	1
9	FW	(England) ENG	Ben Morris	20	1	16	1	0	0	4	0	0	0
10	FW	(Ecuador) ECU	Jeciel Cedeño	19	0	16	0	0	0	0	0	3	0
11	FW	(United States) USA	Connor Rutz	14	1	8	1	0	0	3	0	3	0
15	FW	(United States) USA	Alex Dalou	29	2	22	0	1	0	3	0	3	2
18	FW	(Cameroon) CMR	Preston Tabortetaka	11	2	9	0	0	0	1	0	1	2
19	FW	(Senegal) SEN	Cheikhou Niang	9	0	8	0	1	0	0	0	0	0
23	FW	(England) ENG	Kian Williams	10	1	9	1	1	0	0	0	0	0
26	FW	(Nigeria) NGR	Chisom Egbuchulam	16	2	13	2	0	0	0	0	3	0
32	FW	(Senegal) SEN	Ates Diouf	35	3	27	2	1	0	4	0	3	1
66	FW	(Palestine) PLE	Bilal Obeid	0	0	0	0	0	0	0	0	0	0

Last updated: October 31, 2026.

=== Top scorers ===
Rank	Position	Number	Name	USL	USL Playoffs	USL Cup	U.S. Open Cup	Total
1	FW	7	Darren Smith	14	0	1	1	16
2	MF	21	Maxi Rodriguez	3	0	0	1	4
3	FW	32	Ates Diouf	2	0	0	1	3
3	MF	22	Kobe Hernandez-Foster	3	0	0	0	3
5	FW	15	Alex Dalou	0	0	0	2	2
5	FW	26	Chisom Egbuchulam	2	0	0	0	2
5	MF	17	Rafael Mentzingen	1	0	1	0	2
5	DF	4	Callum Montgomery	1	0	1	0	2
5	FW	18	Preston Tabortetaka	0	0	0	2	2
10	DF	30	Devon Amoo-Mensah	0	1	0	0	1
10	MF	8	Abdoulaye Diop	1	0	0	0	1
10	DF	20	Rio Hope-Gund	1	0	0	0	1
10	FW	9	Ben Morris	1	0	0	0	1
10	FW	11	Connor Rutz	1	0	0	0	1
10	DF	33	Tommy Silva	1	0	0	0	1
10	FW	23	Kian Williams	1	0	0	0	1
10	MF	14	Haruki Yamazaki	0	0	1	0	1

Last updated: October 31, 2026.
