= Detroit City FC =

American professional soccer club based in Detroit

- Full name: Detroit City Football Club
- Nickname: Le Rouge
- Short name: DCFC; City
- Founded: 2012; 14 years ago
- Stadium: Keyworth Stadium; Hamtramck, Michigan
- Capacity: 7,933
- CEO: Sean Mann
- Head coach: Danny Dichio
- League: USL Championship
- 2025: 8th, Eastern Conference; Playoffs: Conference Semifinals
- Website: detcityfc.com
Home colors	Away colors

Detroit City FC is an American professional soccer club based in Detroit, Michigan, that competes in the USL Championship. The club played in the National Premier Soccer League from 2012 to 2019, and the National Independent Soccer Association in 2020 and 2021. Detroit City plays its home matches at Keyworth Stadium in Hamtramck, an enclave of Detroit. A new stadium, AlumniFi Field in southwestern Detroit, is planned to open in 2028.

The team's nickname is Le Rouge, derived from Detroit's French roots and the River Rouge that flows through Detroit and many of its suburbs. As well as fielding a men's professional team, Detroit City also fields a women's outdoor team in the USL W League and an indoor team in the MASLW, a reserve and academy team competing in United Premier Soccer League and USL Academy, and various youth teams throughout Southeast and Mid Michigan.

== History ==
=== Early years ===
Detroit City FC was started by a group of five Detroit residents who wanted a club of their own that would promote the city and help build community through soccer. In their first season in the National Premier Soccer League (NPSL), Detroit City FC finished second in the five team Great Lakes Conference of the Midwest Region. Le Rouge went on to lose 2–1 to AFC Cleveland in the Great Lakes Conference Semi-finals, ending their season with a 5–2–5 record. In December 2012, it was announced that head coach Kylie Stannard and associate coach Cale Wassermann would not return for a second season due to other obligations. The following month, Ben Pirmann took over as head coach and Adil Salmoni was hired as associate head coach.

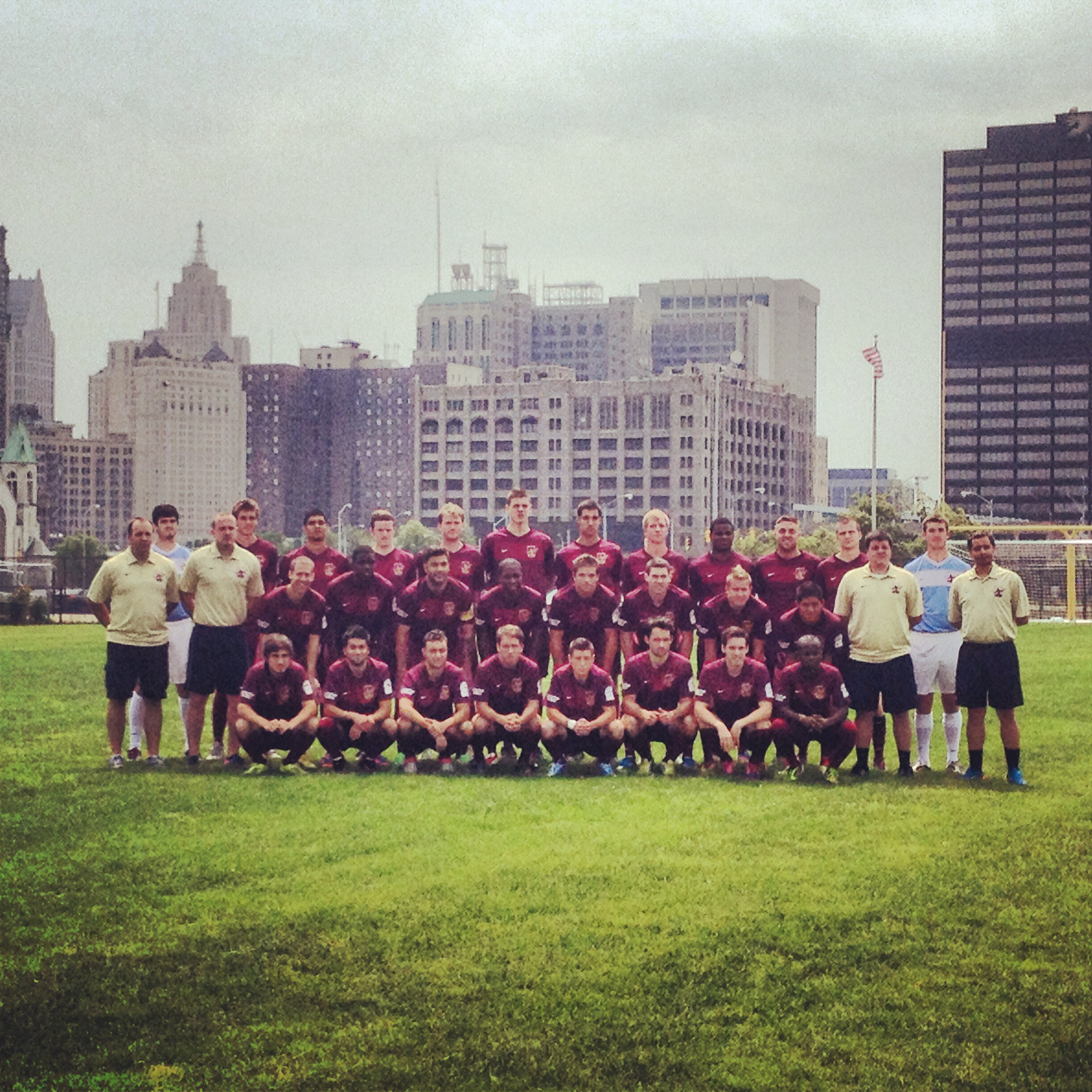
2013 Detroit City team

In 2013, Detroit City finished first in the Great Lakes Conference of the Midwest Region and was ranked No. 1 in the NPSL following an undefeated regular season and a Rust Belt Derby Championship. After beating rival AFC Cleveland for the third time that season in the semi-finals 3–1, DCFC lost to the Erie Admirals, ending the season with a 12–1–1 record.

The club went 8–3–3 in all competitions in 2014 and finished second in the newly aligned Great Lakes West Conference of the NPSL Midwest Region. Detroit City FC made its Lamar Hunt U.S. Open Cup debut on May 7, losing to RWB Adria in penalty kicks after a 2–2 draw. In the NPSL regular season, the club claimed the Rust Belt Derby trophy for its second-straight year. The team also extended its home winning streak to 15 games, with its last home loss in July 2013. In attendance, the club reached its Cass Tech record of 3,884 supporters for its 3–1 win against the Michigan Stars on July 11, 2015.

=== Move to Keyworth ===
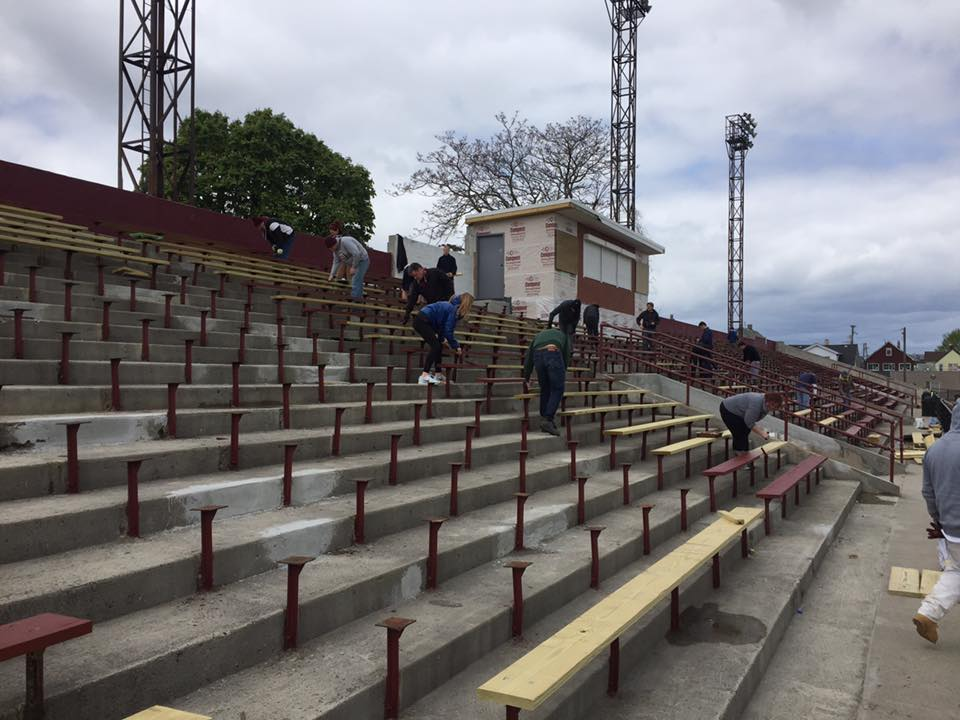
Volunteers work on refurbishing the west grandstand at Keyworth Stadium prior to the 2016 season

Keyworth Stadium within Wayne County, Michigan with the city of Hamtramck highlighted.
Keyworth Stadium within Michigan

The 2016 pre-season began with the Keyworth investment drive, which raised $741,250 for restorations and renovations on Keyworth Stadium. On March 10, Detroit City began roster announcements confirming the return of the 2015 Black Arrow MVP Dave Edwardson. Detroit City played its first home game in Keyworth on May 20, 2016, drawing 1–1 against AFC Ann Arbor in front of a then-record 7,410 supporters. Detroit City saw success in the US Open Cup beating the Michigan Bucks on penalties before falling to Louisville City FC, a professional team and part of the then third division USL, also on penalties. The 2016 NPSL regular season proved less successful, with the team failing to make it to the play-offs and finishing with a 4–4–4 record. In August 2016, Detroit City confirmed Ben Pirmann would return for a fifth season with the club.

After the launch of the 2017 season tickets, the club announced from Belfast that they would face off against Glentoran F.C. in May to celebrate the fiftieth anniversary of the Detroit Cougars. Glentoran FC played in the United Soccer Association as the Detroit Cougars in the 1967 season when they went 3–6–3. Detroit City also had an international friendly against Venezia FC that they won 2–0. Despite starting the 2017 NPSL campaign with two points from three games, Detroit City went on a nine-game winning streak to finish second overall in the Great Lakes Conference. The post-season included three wins, including a 3–2 win over first place Ann Arbor to win the Midwest Championship. Detroit ended its season in the NPSL national semi-finals with a loss on penalties against Midland-Odessa FC, from Texas, in front of a record crowd of 7,533.

Early in 2018, original founder Ben Steffans left the ownership group and was replaced by Mike Lasinski as a full partner, and Joe Richert, a minor partner who was not outwardly announced or involved with running the club. Following the conclusion of the 2018 season, the club opened the Detroit City Fieldhouse in Detroit, Michigan. The Fieldhouse includes a "clubhouse" bar, two indoor soccer fields, and the club's front office and training facilities. It was also announced that head coach Ben Pirmann was stepping down to join Memphis 901 FC as an assistant coach. His successor, Trevor James, a former Ipswich Town F.C. player who later was an assistant coach and scout under Bobby Robson, was announced January 4, 2019.

Detroit City finished first in the Midwest-Great Lakes conference for the 2019 season, but was knocked out in the region finals by Cleveland SC on penalties. In the NPSL Members Cup, Detroit City came in first with an overall record of 8–1–1.

=== Moving up to professional soccer ===
On August 15, 2019, the National Independent Soccer Association announced that Detroit City FC would join the NISA for the 2020 season. On September 28, 2019, Detroit City FC announced that they would be adding a women's side in 2020, participating in United Women's Soccer (UWS).

The 2020 seasons were complicated by the COVID-19 pandemic. The NISA 2019–20 Spring season was canceled after Detroit City played only one match, and the 2020 UWS season was canceled in the months before kickoff. On June 19, 2020, Detroit City announced that they would host a UWS Stadium Showcase at the end of July. In the showcase, the Detroit City women would compete against Lansing United, Midwest United, and Livonia FC. Detroit won their first-ever home match 2–1 against Lansing, but lost to Midwest United 1–3 in the final. NISA announced on July 1, 2020, of an Independent Cup involving 15 teams in 4 regions. Detroit City FC would compete in the Great Lakes Division with former NPSL rivals FC Buffalo and Cleveland SC.

On July 30, 2020, the front office announced the sale of non-share "units" to fans and the public at large, allowing fan investment in the club, while the newly created Board of Managers would remain in control of decisions through Class A Membership. Originally announced to run through November 20, more than 2,000 supporters pledged over $1,000,000 in five days, bringing the club to its investment limit.

=== Joining the USL ===
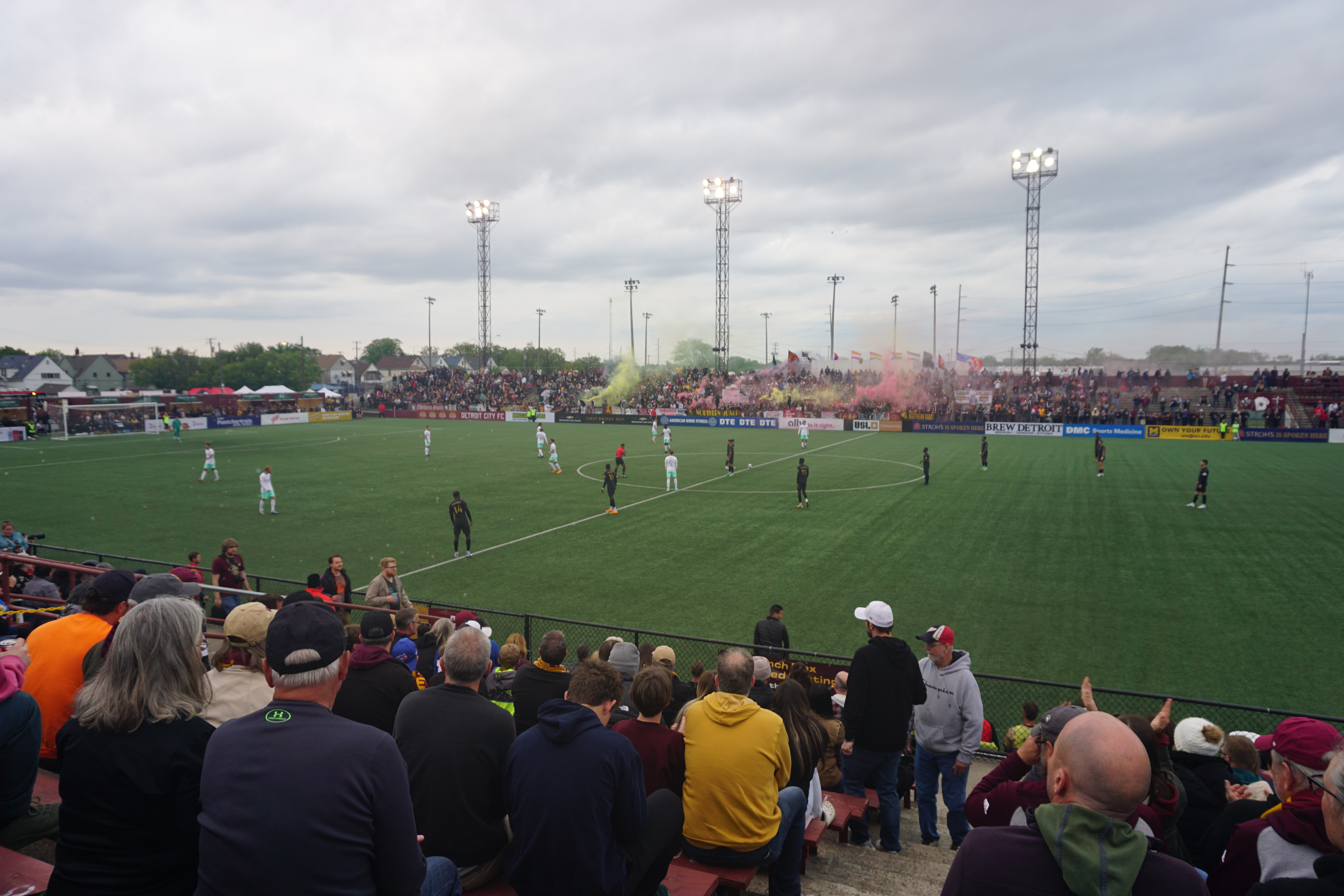
Detroit City FC playing against San Antonio FC at Keyworth Stadium in 2023

On November 13, 2021, it was announced that Detroit City would join the USL Championship for the 2022 season, becoming the third NISA team to join the league after Miami FC and Oakland Roots SC.

After playing them to a home draw (and watching Sacramento Republic FC beat Miami FC in a late-night game by a goal by Michigan-native Russell Cicerone to keep City tied on points with Miami and advance by clinching the last playoff spot, holding the season series over Miami 1-0-1), City would go into top-ranked Pittsburgh (who had 19 wins and 67 points that season), and, from a Dominic Gasso (who had just signed a pro contract, the first to come from an academy contract) goal (his first-ever pro goal) in the 78' and late saves by goalie Nate Steinwascher, Detroit upset Pittsburgh as the 8-seed, giving them their first playoff win since joining the league, having made the playoffs the season before but having lost the first round to Memphis 901 FC.

On May 16, 2024, the club announced plans to build a new soccer-specific stadium at the location of the abandoned Southwest Detroit Hospital near Corktown and Mexicantown. Groundwork and site preparation began in May 2026, with an official groundbreaking ceremony in mid-July. The club hopes to complete the stadium in time for the start of the 2028 season. The stadium was named AlumniFi Field in August 2025.

The club has reported losses of $9.62 million since joining the USL, including $1.23 million in 2021, $2.91 million in 2022, $2.27 million in 2023, and $3.21 million in 2024.

== Club culture ==
=== In the community ===
Since its beginning in 2012, Detroit City FC has been dedicated to supporting the city of Detroit and building community through its own partnerships and philanthropic missions, as noted in the club's motto, "Passion for our city. Passion for the game."

The club operates the Detroit City Futbol League, a recreational, community-driven adult soccer league in the summer. In 2014, the team announced its first fall recreational adult league, Soktoberfest. Detroit City FC also works with Think Detroit PAL to operate free youth soccer clinics and provide free admission to Detroit PAL participants.

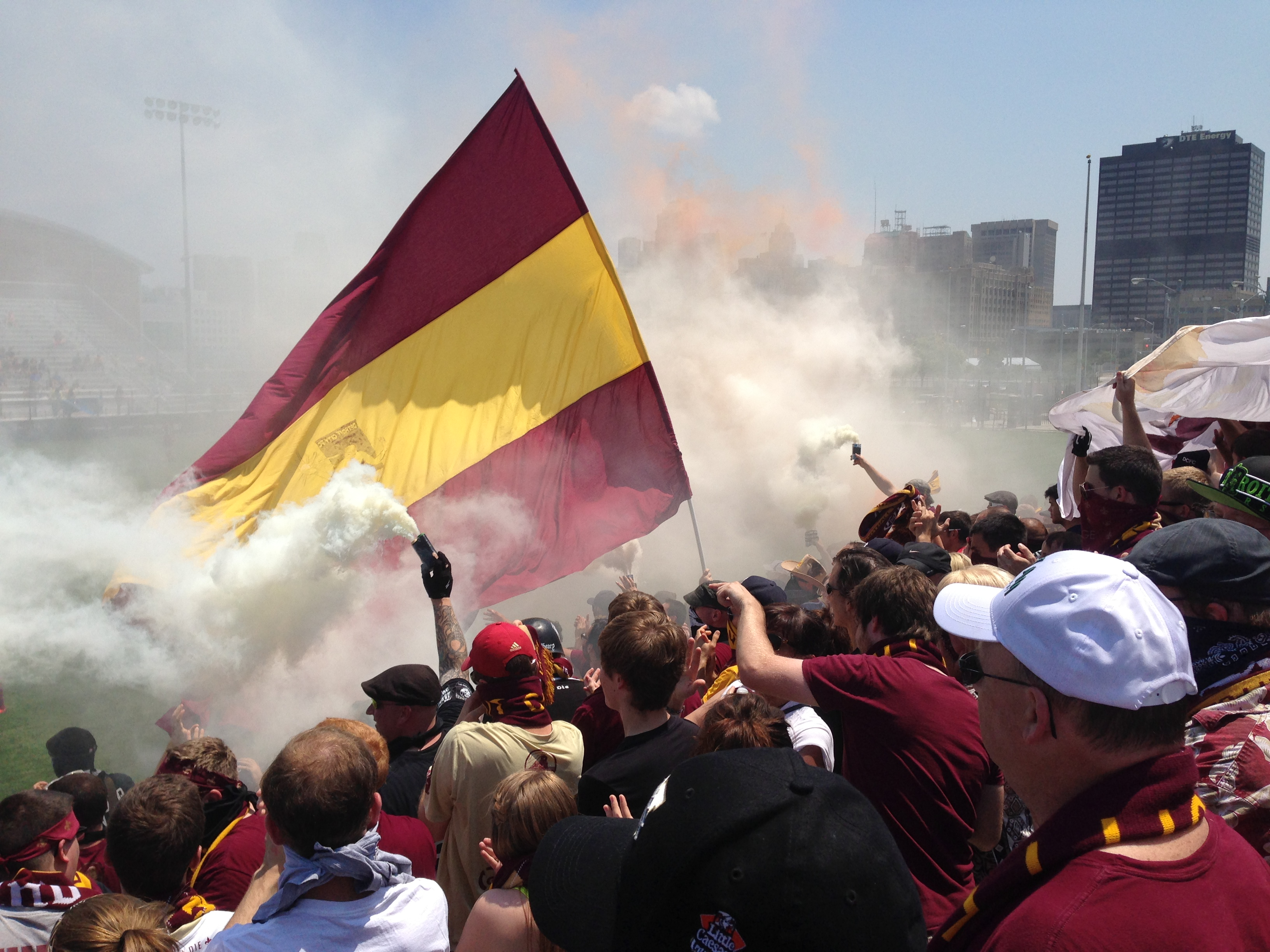
Detroit City FC supporters with the city's skyline behind them during a match at Cass Tech in 2013.

Each season, one regular-season home game is dedicated as a fundraiser for a Detroit-area charity. On May 26, 2013, the club's match against Zanesville Athletic benefited the Wounded Warrior Project and Hooligans for Heroes, a nonprofit started by members of the Northern Guard Supporters. On June 6, 2014, the club became the first American sports team to wear a uniform in support of LGBTQ+ inclusion in a regulation match. Le Rouge dedicated the June 6 match versus Erie Admirals S.C. to inclusivity in sports, auctioning off the commemorative jerseys to benefit the Ruth Ellis Center, a Highland Park, MI., shelter for at-risk, runaway and homeless LGBTQ youth. For the 2015 season, City donned their alternate kits to support Think Detroit PAL, auctioning the game-worn kits to support youth league soccer in the city. On June 9, 2016, it was announced that the June 25 game against Dayton Dynamo would be their annual charity match, supporting Freedom House Detroit, a non-profit supporting refugees seeking asylum in the United States and Canada.

In 2014, the club announced its partnership with United Way of Southeastern Michigan to support its "Michigan No Kid Hungry" initiative and promote healthy lifestyles for youth in Detroit. On September 7, 2014, City hosted its inaugural Detroit Public Schools Showcase, which featured a friendly match for City followed by a regulation match between Cass Tech High School and Detroit Renaissance High School, with proceeds from the night going toward the boys soccer programs. The club has strong ties with Cass Tech High School, investing thousands of dollars into improving the Cass Tech field, a benefit to both the soccer and football programs. City also presented the Cass Tech girls soccer program with new uniforms early in the 2014 season.

=== Supporters ===
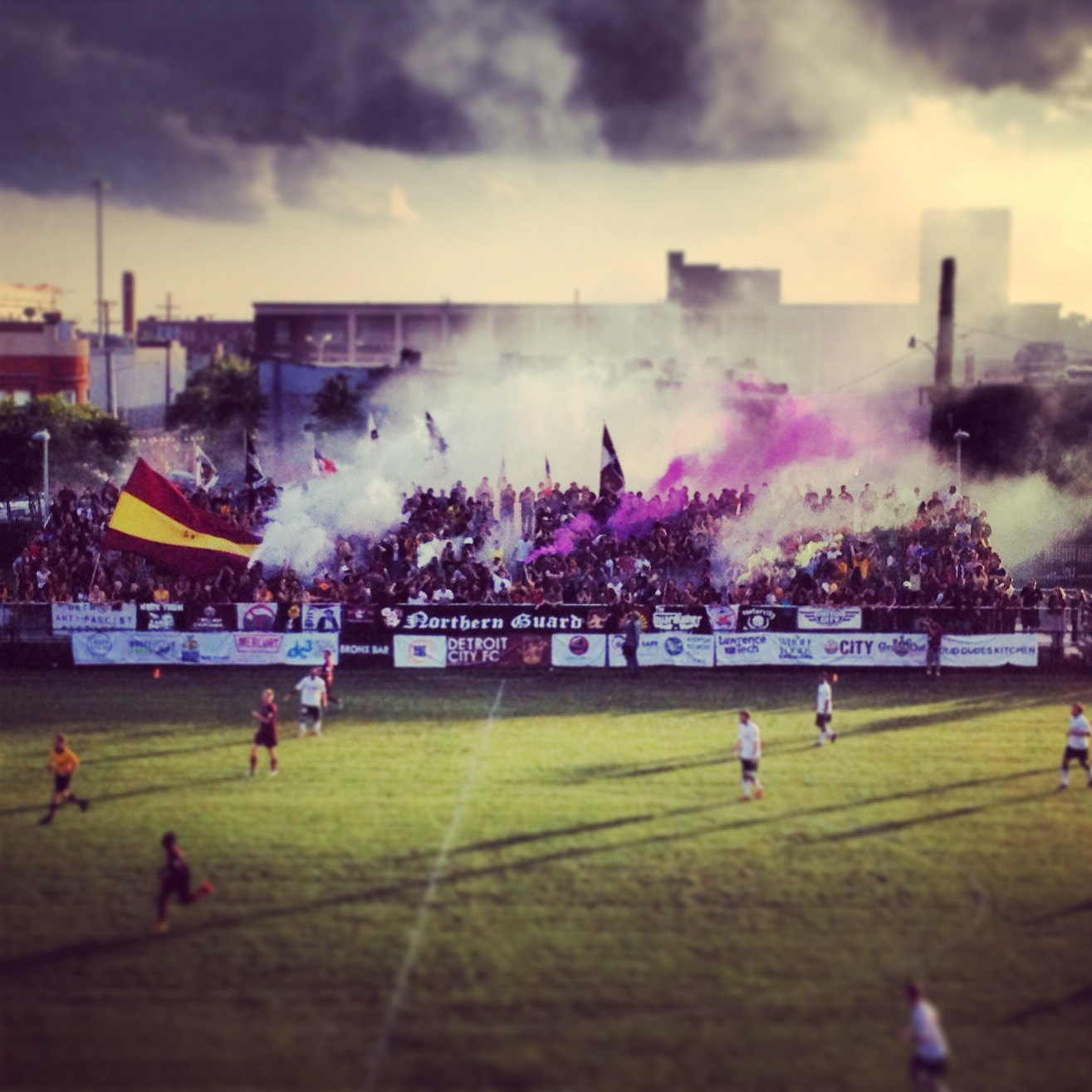
The Northern Guard celebrate a goal during a home game at Cass Tech

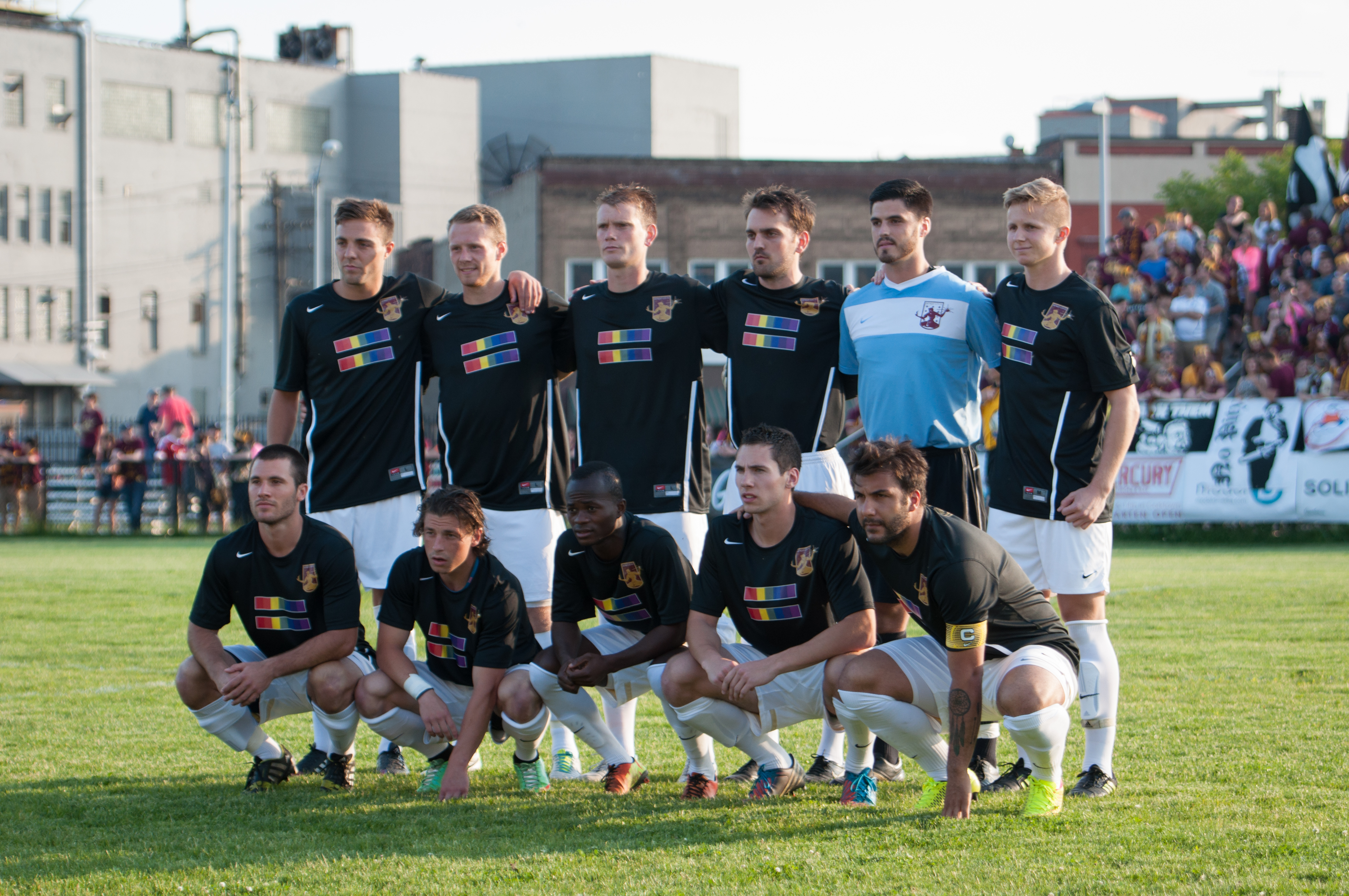
Detroit City FC players wearing kits in support of pro-LGBTQ causes and the Ruth Ellis Center in 2014

Detroit City has several supporter groups, with the largest and most notable being the Northern Guard Supporters. The majority of the supporter culture is politically left-leaning, and banners and flags supporting various traditionally left-wing causes and issues can be seen throughout their section of the stadium.

According to a 2020 feature in the Morning Star, the club and its supporters are noted for their progressive, anti-fascist and community-driven ethos. Founded in 2012, Detroit City FC was established as part of efforts to aid Detroit's cultural and social regeneration through grassroots football. The Northern Guard Supporters are described as anti-racist, anti-fascist and inclusive, with open support for movements such as Black Lives Matter and LGBTQ+ equality. A smaller group, the Keyworth Casuals, is portrayed as more explicitly leftist, engaging in social activism including refugee support and local equality campaigns.

Both the club's management and supporters are reported to share a commitment to maintaining independence and resisting commercialisation. Chief executive Sean Mann has rejected investor offers that would alter the club's ethos, emphasising community ownership and social responsibility. Supporters also back various social causes, including the annual Prideraiser campaign and local partnerships benefiting LGBTQ+ youth.

=== Rivalries ===
Prior to the break-up of the NPSL Midwest-Great Lakes conference, supporters of Detroit City FC, FC Buffalo, and AFC Cleveland formed the 'Rust Belt Derby'. The winner of the Derby was based on the head-to-head record of the clubs during regular season NPSL matches. These were typically high pressure games and particular fan favorites, especially by Detroit City FC supporter groups who have been known to greatly antagonize DCFC's opponents. Cleveland won the inaugural Rust Belt Derby on June 23, 2012, following a 1–1 draw with Detroit. Detroit City FC would come back and win the 2013 Rust Belt Derby trophy after beating FC Buffalo 2–1. The 2014 trophy went to Detroit on goal differential after all three teams finished with a win and a loss in Derby play, and Detroit would win again in 2015 after a 1–1 draw in the FC Buffalo-AFC Cleveland Derby match that Buffalo needed to win by more than a goal to take the trophy. The last Derby was in 2016 after the Great Lakes conference was split into East and West. FC Buffalo and Detroit City FC contested the derby without AFC Cleveland through home and away friendlies.

AFC Ann Arbor was another rival of Detroit City prior to the two clubs leaving the NPSL and joining the USL League Two and NISA respectively. The history and proximity of the two cities cause their clashes to be important to supporters. In 2017, Ann Arbor won the Midwest Conference Regular Season title over City, who finished in second. Both teams qualified for the NPSL playoffs. The two teams faced each other again in the playoffs, with the Midwest Region title on the line. City defeated 10-man Ann Arbor 3–2 to ensure their passage into the NPSL Semifinals.

A cross-league rivalry has developed with the Flint City Bucks (formerly the Michigan Bucks), the other major 4th Division team in Metro-Detroit. The two faced off in the Opening Round of the U.S. Open Cup in 2015, 2016, and 2018, with the Bucks winning the first meeting 3–0 and City taking the second two meetings in penalties (0–0, 4–3 PK) in 2016 and (1–1, 5–4 PK) in 2018. The two sides met for a friendly on May 4, 2019. Flint City won the match 1–0. The 2026 U.S. Open Cup saw another matchup, with Detroit City defeating Flint City 1-0 in the second-round game.

Detroit City supporters have demonstrated an antipathy for the U.S. professional system, particularly Major League Soccer, who has long targeted Detroit for expansion. DCFC has played well against MLS opposition, including a 2–1 victory over the Columbus Crew in the 2022 U.S. Open Cup and the Houston Dynamo in the 2024 edition.

With the announcement of a women's team joining the United Women's Soccer in 2020, Detroit City would be rejoining previous rivals AFC Ann Arbor and Lansing United. They would later continue that rivalry with AFC Ann Arbor in 2021 after both teams moved to the newly returning USL W-League.

== Team image ==
=== Crest ===
Detroit City FC's crest depicts The Spirit of Detroit against a maroon background dotted with gold fleurs-de-lis, in homage to Detroit’s Francophone heritage.

=== Kit ===
Detroit City FC home kits are predominantly a dark shade of red or maroon, referred to as "rouge" as a reference to the club's nickname. Away kits are most often white, though champagne kits have also been worn, most recently in 2021. In 2019 Detroit issued its first set of third kits, which were black. Starting in 2013 and each season afterwards, the club releases an extra kit design as a "charity kit". These kits are then auctioned off at the end of a specified match to raise funds for a local Detroit charity. In 2020 there was no charity kit given the much shorter schedule due to the COVID-19 pandemic.

=== Kit history ===
Home, away, and third kits.

- Home

2012	2013	2014	2015	2016	2017	2018	2019	2020

2021	2022	2023	2024	2025	2026

- Away

2012	2013	2014	2015	2016	2017	2018	2019	2020

2021	2022	2023	2024	2025	2026

- Third

2024	2025

=== Sponsorship ===
Years	Kit manufacturer	Kit sponsor		Charity kit
Years	Kit manufacturer	Front sponsor	Secondary sponsor	Charity kit
2012	Nike	Independent Detroit businesses sponsored individual players	Slows to Go, Michigan Greensafe Products	—
2013	Nike	—	CorePower, MillKing it Productions	Wounded Warrior Project
2014	Nike	—	CorePower, MillKing it Productions	Ruth Ellis Center
2015	Nike	Metro Detroit Chevy Dealers	Henry Ford Health System, M1 Imaging Center	Detroit PAL
2016	Nike	Metro Detroit Chevy Dealers	M1 Imaging Center, Faygo, Henry Ford Health System	Freedom House Detroit
2017	Adidas	Metro Detroit Chevy Dealers	Faygo, Henry Ford Health System, Strategic Staffing Solutions	Alternatives for Girls
2018	Adidas	Lyft	Henry Ford Health System, Strategic Staffing Solutions	United Community Housing Coalition
2019	Adidas	Stroh's	Henry Ford Health System, Strategic Staffing Solutions	We the People of Detroit
2020	Adidas	Metro Detroit Chevy Dealers	Stroh's, Strategic Staffing Solutions	—
2021	Adidas	Metro Detroit Chevy Dealers	Ally Financial, Google Fi, DTE Energy, Strategic Staffing Solutions	Give Merit
2022	Adidas	Metro Detroit Chevy Dealers	Ally Financial, DTE Energy, Strategic Staffing Solutions (Note: Bang was also originally announced in 2022, but the partnership was ended due to fan outcry.)	Women: Hamtramck Historical Museum; Men: The Special Olympics
2023	Adidas	Metro Detroit Chevy Dealers	Ally Financial, DTE Energy, Strategic Staffing Solutions	Spartan Strong Fund, Brilliant Detroit
2024	Adidas	Metro Detroit Chevy Dealers	Ally Financial, DTE Energy, Strategic Staffing Solutions	CHASS Center
2025	Adidas	AlumniFi	DTE Energy, Strategic Staffing Solutions, Wayne State University	Michigan Immigrant Rights Center
2026	Adidas	AlumniFi	DTE Energy, Strategic Staffing Solutions, Wayne State University, Motor City Casino	Capuchin Soup Kitchen

== Players and staff ==
=== Current roster ===
As of September 10, 2026

Note: Flags indicate national team as defined under FIFA eligibility rules; some limited exceptions apply. Players may hold more than one non-FIFA nationality.

No.	Pos.	Nation	Player
1	GK	MEX	Carlos Herrera
2	DF	USA	Rhys Williams
3	DF	USA	Aedan Stanley
4	DF	CAN	Callum Montgomery
6	MF	ENG	Ryan Williams
7	FW	RSA	Darren Smith
8	MF	SEN	Abdoulaye Diop
9	FW	ENG	Ben Morris
10	FW	ECU	Jeciel Cedeño
11	FW	USA	Connor Rutz
12	MF	USA	Michael Bryant
14	DF	JPN	Haruki Yamazaki
15	FW	USA	Alex Dalou
16	GK	ZIM	Tatenda Mkuruva

No.	Pos.	Nation	Player
17	MF	BRA	Rafael Mentzingen
18	FW	CMR	Tabort Etaka Preston
19	FW	SEN	Cheikhou Niang (on loan from FC Cincinnati 2)
20	DF	USA	Rio Hope-Gund
21	MF	USA	Maxi Rodriguez
22	MF	USA	Kobe Hernandez-Foster
23	FW	ENG	Kian Williams (on loan from Indy Eleven)
26	FW	NGR	Chisom Egbuchulam
30	DF	USA	Devon Amoo-Mensah (C)
32	FW	SEN	Ates Diouf
33	DF	USA	Tommy Silva
66	MF	PLE	Bilal Obeid
91	GK	USA	Carlos Saldaña

1. USL Academy Contract

=== Head coaches ===
- Men's: (England) Danny Dichio
- Women's (USL W League): (United States) Dani Evans
- Women's (Major Arena Soccer League): (United States) Dani Evans

=== Sporting Director ===
- Vacant

=== Board of Managers ===
- (United States) Sean Mann – CEO
- (United States) Todd Kropp – COO
- (United States) Alex Wright
- (United States) David Dwaihy
- (United States) Mike Lasinski

=== Managerial History ===
Years	Name	Nation
2012	Kylie Stannard	United States
2013– 2018	Ben Pirmann	United States
2019– 2023	Trevor James	England
2024–	Danny Dichio	England

=== Club captains ===
Years	Name	Nation
2012–2015	Josh Rogers	United States
2016–2018	Dave Edwardson	England
2019–2025	Stephen Carroll	Ireland
2026–present	Devon Amoo-Mensah	United States

=== MVP recipients ===
At the conclusion of each season fans get to vote for the team's most valuable players, the Black Arrow Award. The title of the trophy is taken from the nickname of Gil Heron, a Jamaican born player who lived in Detroit and who later became the first-ever black player for Celtic F.C.

==== Black Arrow Award (Men's) ====
- 2012: (Scotland) Keith Lough and (United States) Josh Rogers
- 2013: (United States) Zach Myers
- 2014: (United States) Cyrus Saydee
- 2015: (England) David Edwardson
- 2016: (United States) Tommy Catalano
- 2017: (South Africa) Tyrone Mondi
- 2018: (Republic of Ireland) Stephen Carroll
- 2019: (Jamaica) Shawn Lawson
- 2020: (Zimbabwe) Tendai Jirira
- 2021: (United States) Connor Rutz
- 2022: (United States) Nate Steinwascher
- 2023: (United States) Devon Amoo-Mensah
- 2024: (United States) Maxi Rodriguez
- 2025: (United States) Michael Bryant
- 2026: (Japan) Haruki Yamazaki

==== Black Arrow Award (Women's) ====
- 2020: (United States) Sydney Blomquist
- 2021: (United States) Madison Duncan
- 2022: (United States) Shannon McCarthy
- 2023: (United States) Avery Peters
- 2024: (United States) Gabby Schriver
- 2025: (United States) Hannah Crum
- 2026: (United States) Allison LaPoint

== Honors ==
Detroit City FC honors
Type	Competition	Titles	Seasons
Domestic	NISA Season Championship	2	2020–21, 2021
Domestic	NISA Fall Championship	1^{s}	2020
Domestic	NISA Legends Cup	1	2021
Domestic	NISA Independent Cup: Great Lakes Region	2^{s}	2020, 2021
Domestic	NPSL Midwest Region	1	2017
Domestic	NPSL Great Lakes Conference Regular Season	2^{s}	2013, 2019
Domestic	NPSL Members Cup	1^{s}	2019
Derby	Rust Belt Derby	6	2013, 2014, 2015, 2016, 2020, 2021

- record
- ^{s} shared record

== Record ==
=== Men's team ===
==== Year-by-year ====
This is a partial list of the last five seasons completed by Detroit City. For the full season-by-season history, see List of Detroit City FC seasons.

Season	Tier	League	Conf/Div	Record							Position		Playoffs	USOC	USL Cup	Avg. Attendance	Top goalscorer	
Season	Tier	League	Conf/Div	Pld	W	D	L	GF	GA	Pts	Conf	Ovr	Playoffs	USOC	USL Cup	Avg. Attendance	Name	Goals
2021 Fall	3	NISA		18	14	3	1	35	10	45	-	1st	W	NH	-	4,280	(United States) Maxi Rodriguez	7
2022	2	USLC	Eastern	34	14	12	8	44	30	54	7th	10th	R1	Ro32	-	6,118	(United States) Maxi Rodriguez	9
2023	2	USLC	Eastern	34	11	8	15	30	39	41	8th	18th	QF	R3	-	6,032	(England) Ben Morris	7
2024	2	USLC	Eastern	34	15	11	8	46	32	56	3rd	4th	R1	Ro16	DNP	6,312	(United States) Maxi Rodriguez	12
2025	2	USLC	Eastern	30	9	10	11	33	35	37	8th	15th	QF	Ro32	R1	6,229	(South Africa) Darren Smith	13
2026	2	USLC	Eastern	30	14	9	7	34	21	51	3rd	4th	R1	Ro32	R1	6,251	(South Africa) Darren Smith	16

==== Tournaments ====
Name	Year	Group	Pos.	Pl.	W	D	L	GS	GA	Pts.	Playoffs	Top goalscorer	
Name	Year	Group	Pos.	Pl.	W	D	L	GS	GA	Pts.	Playoffs	Name	Total
NPSL Members Cup	2019	N/A	1st	10	8	1	1	17	4	25	N/A	(South Africa) Yazeed Matthews	5
NISA Independent Cup	2020	Great Lakes	1st	2	2	0	0	6	0	6	N/A	(Jamaica) Shawn Lawson (United States) Connor Rutz	2
NISA Legends Cup	2021	Group 2	3rd	2	1	1	0	2	0	4	Champions	Six players tied	1
NISA Independent Cup	2021	Great Lakes	1st	3	3	0	0	17	2	9	N/A	(South Africa) Yazeed Matthews	4

==== Yearly attendance ====
Year	League	Stadium	Avg Reg. Season Attendance	Avg Attendance (All games) (Note: Includes regular season, playoffs, U.S. Open Cup, and friendlies)	Total attendance
2012	NPSL	Cass Technical High School Stadium	1,296	1,244	9,948
2013	NPSL	Cass Technical High School Stadium	1,484	1,591	15,914
2014	NPSL	Cass Technical High School Stadium	2,857	2,642	23,755 (Note: The May 7, U.S. Open Cup match versus RWB Adria, which is not included in the source's data, has been added. The game, which was played at Stevenson High School in Livonia, Michigan with Detroit City designated as host, drew a crowd of 753.)
2015	NPSL	Cass Technical High School Stadium	3,528	3,306	29,752
2016	NPSL	Keyworth Stadium	5,208	5,255	52,550
2017	NPSL	Keyworth Stadium	5,367	5,498	87,965
2018	NPSL	Keyworth Stadium	5,584	5,946	77,298
2019	NPSL	Keyworth Stadium	6,341	6,037	66,401
2019–20	NISA	Keyworth Stadium	5,498 (Note: Only includes Members Cup as no home games were played prior to the 2019–20 NISA season being canceled)	5,647	45,177
2020–21	NISA	Keyworth Stadium	0	0	0 (Note: Due to the COVID-19 pandemic, fans were not allowed to attend home matches in 2020)
2021	NISA	Keyworth Stadium	4,280	4,280	38,516
2022	USLC	Keyworth Stadium	6,118	–	104,012
2023	USLC	Keyworth Stadium	6,032	–	102,544
2024	USLC	Keyworth Stadium	6,261	–	113,621
2025	USLC	Keyworth Stadium	6,229	–	108,189

===== Record attendances =====
- Cass Technical High School Stadium: 3,884 (July 11, 2015, vs. Michigan Stars)
- Keyworth Stadium: 7,887 (July 31, 2018, vs. Frosinone Calcio)

==== International friendlies ====
Starting in 2016, after the move to Keyworth, Detroit City began a yearly tradition to invite at least one international club for a friendly per year. This excludes Windsor TFC, which is based just miles away in neighboring Windsor and was played yearly since the club's first season up until 2020. These invitations are often extended to a club that has a similar ethos to Detroit City, or holds historical significance to the city of Detroit. The 2018 match against Serie A side Frosinone Calcio set a new club attendance record of 7,887. In 2019, after announcing that the club was to play Lobos BUAP of Mexico, Lobos faced financial trouble and was replaced both in the Liga MX and the friendly with FC Juárez.

Year	Opponent	Result
2016	(England) FC United of Manchester	3–3
2017	(Northern Ireland) Glentoran FC	1–0
2017	(Italy) Venezia F.C.	2–0
2018	(Germany) FC St. Pauli	2–6
2018	(Mexico) Club Necaxa	1–2
2018	(Italy) Frosinone Calcio	0–10
2019	(Mexico) FC Juárez	1–3
2019	(Mexico) Club Atlas	2–1
2024	(Mexico) Pumas UNAM	1–0
2025	(Mexico) Club Santos Laguna	0–1

=== Women's team ===
==== Year-by-year ====
Season				Record							Position	Playoffs
Year	Tier	League	Conf/Div	Pld	W	D	L	GF	GA	Pts	Div	Playoffs
2021	4	United Women's Soccer	Midwest North	10	6	0	4	32	12	18	3rd	did not qualify
2022	4	USL W League	Great Lakes	12	3	3	6	15	22	12	5th	did not qualify
2023	4	USL W League	Great Lakes	12	5	3	4	19	17	18	3rd	did not qualify
2024	4	USL W League	Great Lakes	12	10	2	0	24	5	32	1st	SF
2025	4	USL W League	Great Lakes	10	7	1	2	18	6	22	1st	Conf. SF
2026	4	USL W League	Great Lakes	10	4	2	4	18	15	14	3rd	did not qualify
