= Southwest Detroit Hospital =

Defunct hospital in Detroit

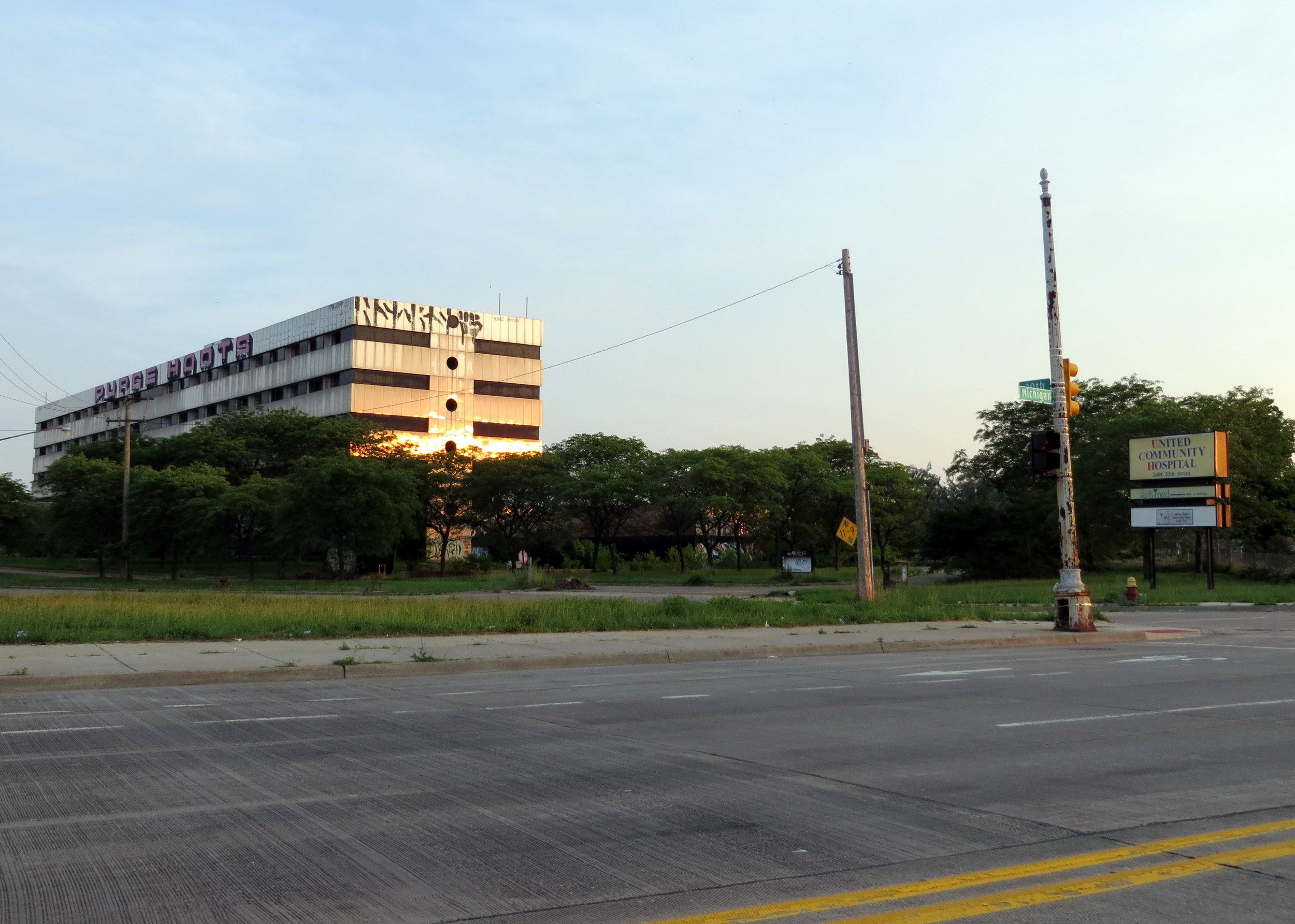
- The hospital in 2013. The short-lived United Community Hospital branding is seen to the right.

Geography
- Location: 2401 20th Street, Detroit, Michigan, United States
- Coordinates: 42°19′48″N 83°05′02″W

Organization
- Type: Community hospital

Services
- Beds: 246 beds

History
- Founded: 1973 (original), 1997 (UCH rebrand)
- Closed: 1991 (original), 2006 (UCH rebrand)
- Demolished: 2026

Links
- Lists: Hospitals in Michigan

Southwest Detroit Hospital was a hospital located in the Corktown neighborhood of Detroit, Michigan, United States. It opened in 1973 as the first Detroit hospital to hire and accredit African American doctors and nurses, which was uncommon in the United States at that time. The original hospital was only in existence for 17 years; in 1991, it declared bankruptcy and closed down.

In 1997, the hospital re-opened as United Community Hospital; however, due to financial struggles, the hospital closed again in January 2006. Since then, the building remained abandoned.

In 2024, Detroit City Football Club acquired the former hospital site as the preferred location for a new soccer stadium, with demolition of the hospital completed by early 2026.

== History ==
Before and during the civil rights movement, the lack of hospitals accepting Black patients lead to poorer health among African-Americans compared to their white counterparts. African-American doctors were usually segregated to black-only hospitals; it was very uncommon for them to be working within larger hospitals. Many of these hospitals are now gone, including those that led to the founding of Southwest Detroit Hospital. (The only black-owned and operated hospital remaining in the U.S. is Howard University Hospital in Washington, D.C.)

By the late 1960s, several small black-only hospitals in Detroit had merged to form one larger hospital to serve their communities better. This merged hospital became Southwest Detroit Hospital. By the early 1970s, the hospitals of Boulevard General, Delray General, Burton Mercy, and Trumbull General (the last being black-owned and the newest hospital of the group) had decided to merge their resources for a larger hospital, deciding on a 246-bed hospital at a cost of $21 million. The hospital's construction was completed by 1973, being granted the deed to the building in October 1973. The hospital operated under stable conditions for the first few years; in the late 1970s, the hospital began to encounter numerous lawsuits and controversies.

In 1977, a doctor at Southwest, Leonardo Lopez, was charged for selling illegal forms of amphetamines and was suspended from practicing medicine for 6 months. Lopez returned to the hospital on the condition that he could only prescribe there. Lopez attempted to appeal the ruling but was unsuccessful. This was part of a larger operation; over 86 doctors had faced various charges related to unethical medical decisions.

In 1990, the 6th District court in Michigan heard the case of Elease Thornton, who sued the hospital. According to Thornton, she had stayed at the hospital for 21 days in August 1987, and the hospital released her while she was in an unstable condition following a stroke. In December 1987, Thornton was admitted to a local rehabilitation center following an initial denial into the center due to a lack of health insurance. Even though the Circuit Court of Appeals ruled alongside the 6th District that Thornton was stable enough to be discharged from the hospital (therefore following the Emergency Medical Treatment and Active Labor Act), the case could have been a final blow to the hospital, as the hospital would soon declare bankruptcy and close a year later in 1991. Despite the bankruptcy, and a candlelight vigil to save the hospital, several operations continued to stay open until 1993.

== Re-opening as United Community Hospital ==
In 1996, Ultimed, a company owned and led by Detroit businessman and developer Harley K. Brown, purchased the building for $1.5 million and re-opened the hospital under the name United Community Hospital, which then opened in 1997. In 1999, Brown invested $6 million in renovations and updates for the first two floors of the hospital. Despite this investment, the hospital still struggled, similar to its predecessor on the same grounds.

By this point, Ultimed directors—including Brown—were involved in unethical financial decisions with funds from small businesses that Ulticare was providing insurance to, including $15 million in taxpayer funds it was receiving from Wayne County. The directors had also used their corporate American Express cards on lavish, non-company expenses, such as trips to the Virgin Islands, Japan, China, and Las Vegas; meals at top-of-the-line restaurants; and various other luxury expenses. Additionally, Ultimed did not pay numerous claims, which led to as many as 1,500 complaints to the county.

On January 25, 2006, following nearly $2.5 million in unpaid claims, Ultimed was placed into rehabilitation by the Michigan Office of Financial and Insurance Regulation and placed under the hands of a court-appointed rehabilitator, until the company was determined if it should be declared insolvent.

The company no longer exists, and the building sat abandoned until its demolition. Brown continued to own the building and, in 2018, was facing jail time for unpaid child support.

== Post-closure and demolition ==
Harley K. Brown owned the building until it was sold to the Detroit City Football Club; however, Brown did not pay the taxes on the building. Instead, these taxes had been paid by Detroit landlord Dennis Kefallinos from 2016 to 2024. The building was completely gutted in 2017 and sits plainly as a steel structure. A sign depicting a mixed-use development, including businesses, restaurants, and a second location of Detroit pizza chain Niki's Pizza, appeared on the property in May 2018; however, these developments never came. According to the Detroit Free Press, Kefallinos had been looking to lease the building to a third party.

Many urban exploration bloggers and YouTubers who had visited the structure claim that it still contained leftover items from the hospital's operations, including medical records, hospital equipment, and mechanical operations equipment. A blogger from the site Pixable commented that the basement was completely frozen over due to flooding. The building had also been covered in bullet holes and various graffiti visible from nearby I-96, including a large tag that reads "Purge Suey". In 2015, city officials ordered Brown to remove the graffiti and interior debris, as well as pump out the flooded basement.

The location will be the future home of the Detroit City Football Club Stadium, named AlumniFi Field. Demolition of the hospital building and construction began in 2025, with the structure fully removed by February 2026. As of July 2026, Barton Malow was selected as the primary contractor to construct AlumniFi Field. In June, a statement was issued pushing back the opening date from early 2027 to spring 2028.
