= Callum Montgomery =

Canadian soccer player (born 1997)

Personal information
- Date of birth: May 14, 1997 (age 29)
- Place of birth: Nanaimo, British Columbia, Canada
- Height: 1.90 m (6 ft 3 in)
- Position: Defender

Team information
- Current team: Detroit City FC

Youth career
- Nanaimo SA
- 2011–2015: Vancouver Island Wave

College career
Years	Team	Apps	(Gls)
2015–2018	Charlotte 49ers	73	(11)

Senior career*
Years	Team	Apps	(Gls)
2016–2018	Victoria Highlanders	25	(4)
2019–2020	FC Dallas	0	(0)
2019	→ North Texas SC (loan)	20	(3)
2020	→ San Antonio FC (loan)	9	(2)
2021–2022	Minnesota United	0	(0)
2021	→ San Diego Loyal (loan)	17	(1)
2022	→ Minnesota United 2 (loan)	8	(0)
2023–2025	Cavalry FC	60	(2)
2026–	Detroit City FC	30	(1)

International career^{‡}
2021	Canada U23	2	(0)
- * Club domestic league appearances and goals as of November 4, 2026 ‡ National team caps and goals as of March 28, 2021

Callum Montgomery (born May 14, 1997) is a Canadian soccer player who plays for USL Championship side Detroit City FC.

== Early life ==
Montgomery was born in Nanaimo, British Columbia to a Canadian father and Fijian mother. He began playing youth soccer at age four with the Nanaimo Soccer Association. Afterwards, he joined the Vancouver Island Wave in 2011. In Grade 11, he began attending boarding school at St. Michaels University School, and helped them to a BC Provincial AA Championship title in 2014, scoring the winning goal in the final and being named tournament MVP.

== College career ==
In 2015, Montgomery began attending the University of North Carolina at Charlotte, where he played for the men's soccer team. He scored his first collegiate goal on October 20, 2015 against the Virginia Tech Hokies. At the end of the season, he was named to the Conference USA All-Freshman Team.

During his sophomore season, he helped the 49ers win the Conference USA regular-season title, and was named a Second-Team CoSIDA Academic All-American, Conference USA All-Academic team, and First-Team CoSIDA Academic All-District.

During his junior season, he was a Second-team CoSIDA Academic All-American, earned CoSIDA Academic All-District, United Soccer Coaches All-South Region Scholar and Conference USA All-Academic honours, and was named to the Second Team All-Southeast Region, was a First Team All-Conference USA and First Team All-State.

In his senior season, he was named a First Team All-American, a First-Team CoSIDA Academic All-American, the Conference USA Scholar-Athlete of the Year, Conference USA Defensive Player of the Year, First-team All-Southeast Region, First-Team All-Conference USA, was named to the Conference USA All-Tournament team, was a semifinalist for the MAC Hermann Trophy, was a Second-team Senior CLASS Award All-American, First-team Scholar All-American, First-team Scholar All-South Region, Second-team TopDrawerSoccer.com All-American, First-team NCCSIA All-State, and was named Team MVP. He scored 11 goals in 73 appearances, over his four seasons, and was invited to the MLS Combine, ahead of the 2019 MLS SuperDraft. He was named the top centre-back prospect ahead of the draft.

== Club career ==
From 2016 to 2018, he played with the Victoria Highlanders in the Premier Development League, captaining the side in his final two seasons. In 2016, he was named Lake Side Buoys Supporters’ Choice Award as the Highlanders’ player of the year. In 2018, he was named to the 2018 PDL All-League and the PDL All-Western Conference teams.

In January 2019, he was selected in the first round (fourth overall) of the 2019 MLS SuperDraft by FC Dallas. He officially signed with the club in February, after having participated in the club's pre-season and playing five pre-season matches, in which he scored one goal. He spent the 2019 season on loan with the second team, North Texas SC, in USL League One. In February 2020, he was loaned to San Antonio FC in the USL Championship. He made his debut for San Antonio on March 7, 2020, scoring his first goal against the Real Monarchs. After the 2020 season, his contract option was declined by Dallas.

In December 2020, Montgomery's MLS rights were traded to Minnesota United FC in exchange for a fourth round pick in the 2022 MLS SuperDraft and $50,000 in conditional General Allocation Money. In February 2021, he signed a new contract with Minnesota. In June 2021, he was loaned to USL Championship side San Diego Loyal SC for the rest of the 2021 season. In November 2022, Minnesota United declined his club option for the 2023 season.

In February 2023, he signed with Cavalry FC of the Canadian Premier League. In December 2023, Montgomery re-signed with Cavalry for the 2024 season, with a club option for 2025. In January 2025, Montgomery would sign a contract extension with Cavalry.

In February 2026, Detroit City FC announced they had signed Montgomery to a contract for the 2026 USL Championship season with a club option for 2027.

== International career ==
In 2019, he was named to the Canada U23 player pool ahead of qualification for the 2020 Olympics. In 2020, he was officially named to the Canada U23 team for the 2020 CONCACAF Men's Olympic Qualifying Championship, later being re-named to the squad in March 2021 (as the tournament was delayed from 2020 due to the COVID-19 pandemic. He made his debut in the first group game against El Salvador, where he suffered an injury, returning in the semi-final loss to Mexico.

== Career statistics ==
As of match played May 30, 2026

Appearances and goals by club, season and competition
Club	Season	League			Playoffs		National Cup		Continental		Total	
Club	Season	Division	Apps	Goals	Apps	Goals	Apps	Goals	Apps	Goals	Apps	Goals
Victoria Highlanders	2016	Premier Development League	12	1	—		—		—		12	1
Victoria Highlanders	2017	Premier Development League	3	1	—		—		—		3	1
Victoria Highlanders	2018	Premier Development League	10	2	—		—		—		10	2
Victoria Highlanders	Total		25	4	0	0	0	0	0	0	25	4
North Texas SC (loan)	2019	USL League One	20	3	2	0	—		—		22	3
San Antonio FC (loan)	2020	USL Championship	9	2	0	0	—		—		9	2
San Diego Loyal SC (loan)	2021	USL Championship	17	1	1	0	—		—		18	1
Minnesota United FC 2 (loan)	2022	MLS Next Pro	8	0	—		—		—		8	0
Cavalry FC	2023	Canadian Premier League	11	0	2	0	1	0	—		14	0
Cavalry FC	2024	Canadian Premier League	21	1	2	0	2	0	2	0	27	1
Cavalry FC	2025	Canadian Premier League	24	1	0	0	1	0	2	0	27	1
Cavalry FC	Total		56	2	4	0	4	0	4	0	68	2
Detroit City FC	2026	USL Championship	11	0	0	0	4	0	0	0	15	0
Career total			146	12	7	0	8	0	4	0	165	12

== Honours ==
Cavalry FC

- Canadian Premier League: 2024
