= Ruth Ellis (activist) =

American LGBT rights activist

- Ellis c. 1945
- Born: Ruth Charlotte Ellis; July 23, 1899; Springfield, Illinois, U.S.
- Died: October 5, 2000 (aged 101); Detroit, Michigan, U.S.
- Education: Springfield High School
- Occupations: Printer, LGBT activist
- Years active: 1937–2000

Ruth Charlotte Ellis (July 23, 1899 – October 5, 2000) was an African-American LGBT rights activist and one of the oldest surviving open lesbians at the age of 101. Her life is celebrated in Yvonne Welbon's documentary film Living With Pride: Ruth C. Ellis @ 100.

== Early life ==
Ellis was born in Springfield, Illinois, on July 23, 1899. She was the youngest of four children and the only girl. Ellis' mother, Carrie Farro Ellis, died when she was a teen, while her father, Charles Ellis Sr., was the first African-American mail carrier in Illinois. Ellis Sr.'s appointment was controversial and he was called a racial slur in a Springfield newspaper following his appointment. Along with the racism her father faced, Ruth Ellis was exposed to much racism and racial violence in her upbringing. As a young child, Ellis witnessed Springfield race riot of 1908, during which her father defended their home with a sword from their front porch.

Ellis became open about her identity as a lesbian around 1915, but claims to never have had to come out, as her family was accepting of her orientation. She graduated from Springfield High School in 1919, at a time when fewer than seven percent of African Americans graduated from secondary school. In the 1920s, she met the only woman she ever lived with, Ceciline "Babe" Franklin.

== Career ==
Ellis worked for a printing company in the 1920s. She learned printing and typesetting while working at Black-owned print shop I.E. Foster & Co.

Ellis and Franklin moved to Detroit together in 1937. Like many other African Americans in the Great Migration, they sought better employment opportunities in the city. Like many other African American women, Ellis found work in the domestic sphere: she babysat a young boy in Highland Park, for $7 a week.

She then got a printing position with Waterfield and Heath, where she worked until opening her own press out of the West Side home she shared with Franklin. Their printing business, the Ellis & Franklin Printing Co., was the first woman-owned printing shop in the state of Michigan.

== Personal life ==
Her hobbies included dance, bowling, painting, piano, and photography.

Ellis lived with Babe Franklin mostly in the period prior to the Civil Rights Movement and the national Gay liberation movement, during which black queer people in Detroit were often excluded from white queer spaces. Ellis and Franklin's house was known in the African-American community as the "gay spot," a central location for gay and lesbian parties, particularly as a refuge for African-American gays and lesbians. Ellis often supported those who needed books, food, or assistance with college tuition.

Ellis and Franklin were together for over 30 years before separating. In 1971, Ellis and Franklin's home in Detroit was demolished in an urban renewal construction project. In 1973, Franklin suffered a heart attack on her way to work and passed away (some sources state her death date was in 1975, but her grave places it at December 12, 1973).

== Death ==
Ellis was hospitalized in 2000 for two weeks with heart problems, but wanted to spend her last days at home. She died in her sleep in the early morning of October 5, 2000. Her ashes were spread in the following Michigan Womyn's Music Festival and in the Atlantic Ocean off the coast of Ghana.

== Recognition ==
Ellis became a staple at the Michigan Womyn's Music Festival soon after it began. On her 100th birthday, she was sung "Happy Birthday" by the San Francisco Dyke March of 1999, which she led.

Ellis has been recognized in major LGBT publications across the country. A documentary movie about her was made called Living With Pride: Ruth Ellis @ 100. The film won several awards at film festivals. In 2009, Ellis was inducted into the Michigan Women's Hall of Fame. In 2013, she was inducted into the Legacy Walk, an outdoor public display which celebrates LGBT history and people.

Ellis was the oldest contributor to Piece of My Heart: A Lesbian of Colour Anthology, in which she was interviewed by Terri L. Jewell.

In 2025, Ellis was featured in Kaila Adia Story's article "Black Dahlias – The Radical Black Femme and Black Feminist Traditions Within Black Studies." An analysis of her life and her contributions to her community was placed in historical context with other Black femme and queer activists across American history: "Her advocacy for Detroit's Black LGBTQ+ community, and the opening up of her home as a place of respite and rejoice, indeed laid the groundwork for our modern-day concepts of "safe spaces," and "chosen family."

=== Ruth Ellis Center ===
The Ruth Ellis Center honors the life and work of Ruth Ellis and is one of only four agencies in the United States dedicated to homeless LGBT youth and young adults. Among their services are a drop-in center, supportive housing programs, and an integrated Health and Wellness Center that provides medical and mental health care.

The center had its grand opening in September of 2000, and the 101-year-old Ellis attended the event and spoke: "It's been a miracle to me to see my name on a building, the Ruth Ellis Center, that's taking care of young people. I hope you have plenty of success and I hope you get grants that will help you go further and further."

=== Bentley Historical Library Collection ===
In 2000, Ellis assembled and donated a collection of materials from her life from around 1910-2000 to the Bentley Historical Library at the University of Michigan in Ann Arbor. The collection, called the Ruth Ellis papers, includes photos of Ellis and her friends and family, correspondence to and from her, and a recording of a radio interview with her. The collection also includes Keith Boykin's book Respecting the Soul:Daily Reflections for Black Lesbians and Gays which is dedicated to Ellis.
