= AlumniFi Field =

Future soccer stadium in Detroit

- Interactive map of AlumniFi Field
- Address: 2401 20th Street; Detroit, Michigan, United States
- Coordinates: 42.3299°N 83.0845°W
- Owner: Detroit City FC
- Operator: Detroit City FC
- Capacity: 15,000 (planned)
- Surface: Grass

Construction
- Groundbreaking: July 15, 2026
- Opened: 2028 (planned)
- Cost: US$200 million
- Architects: HOK; Disbrow Iannuzzi (interiors)
- General contractor: Barton Malow

Tenant
- Detroit City FC (2028–future)

Website
- alumnififield.com

AlumniFi Field is a soccer-specific stadium under construction in the Corktown neighborhood of Detroit, Michigan, United States. It will be home to USL Championship club Detroit City FC. It is expected to have 15,000 seats and cost $200 million to construct.

== History ==
Having bought the site in March 2024, Detroit City FC announced on May 16, 2024, that they had purchased the land at the abandoned Southwest Detroit Hospital site in Corktown, located in southwest Detroit, with intentions to build a 15,000 seat soccer-specific stadium. A project estimated to cost around $150 million. Later estimates, after capacity was increased from 14,000, expect a cost of $200 million. The development has additions to the site includes mixed-use development that includes housing, commercial space, and a parking garage. The team named in July architects HOK to help design the stadium, with the architect firm having worked on previous soccer stadiums like Lynn Family Stadium and Energizer Park.

The city council of Detroit approved $6.9 million of public funds in April 2025 to be allocated to the aid in the $7.5 million cost expected to fully demolish the abandoned hospital site. Work on the site began in May, with over two million gallons of water having to be pumped out of the basement of the hospital. Actual construction on the site was delayed from the planned start of July, in part of the club having found a body inside the basement during the drainage process.

AlumniFi Credit Union was announced as the naming rights sponsor in August 2025.

Detroit City FC announced in June 2026 that interior spaces for AlumniFi Field would be designed by architecture firm Disbrow Iannuzzi. AlumniFi Field announced the general contractor for construction would be Barton Malow. The club revised the planned opening date from 2027 to spring 2028. A formal groundbreaking ceremony was held on July 15, 2026.
