= Northern Guard Supporters =

Independent supporters' group for Detroit City FC

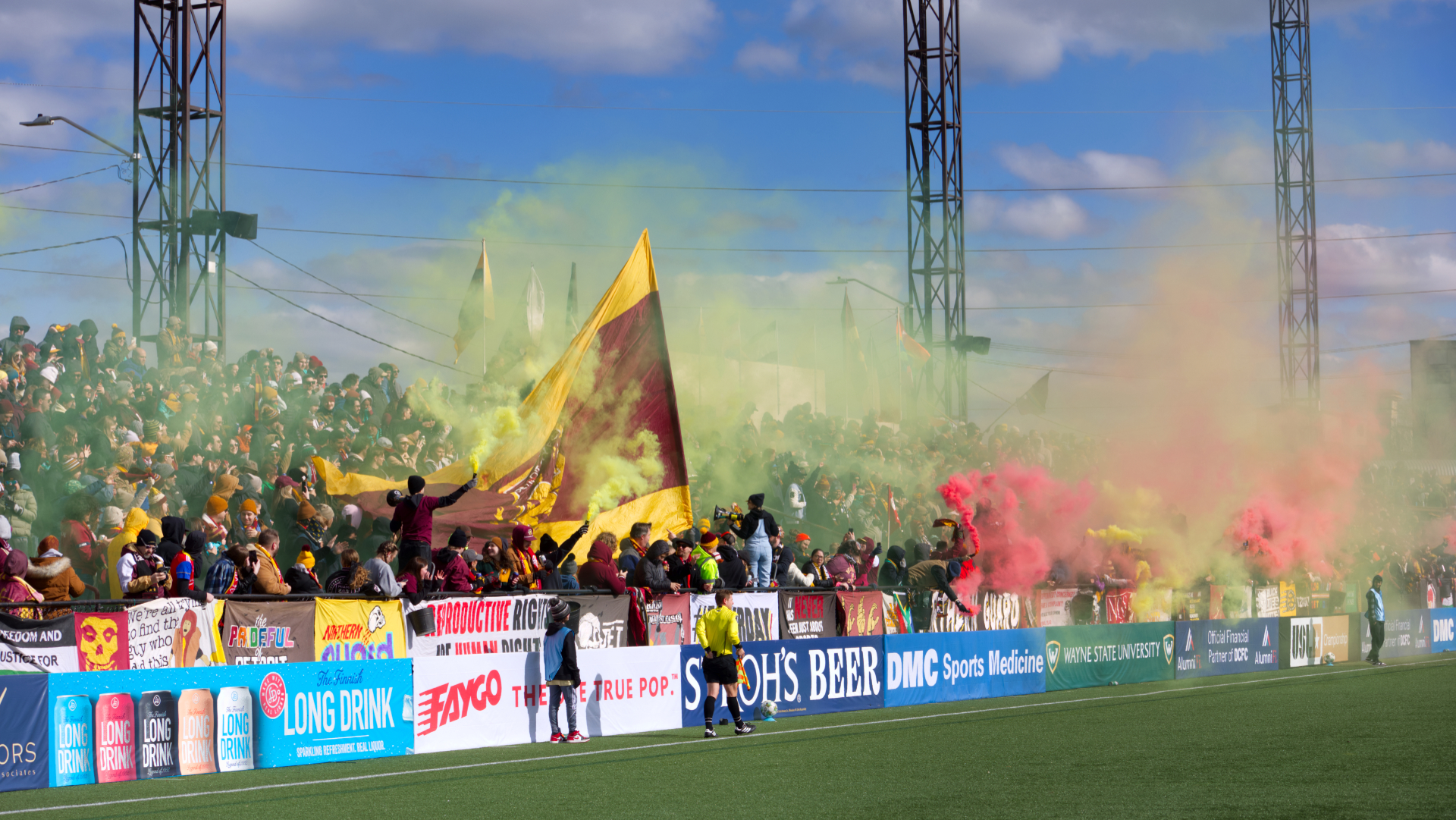
- NGS @ DCFC v Birmingham Legion FC in March, 2025
- Abbreviation: NGS
- Established: 2012
- Type: Supporters' group
- Team: Detroit City FC
- Motto: Come And Get It
- Location: Hamtramck, Michigan
- Stadium: Keyworth Stadium
- Membership: More than 800 (estimated)
- Colors: "Rouge" (red), gold, and black
- Website: noonelikes.us

The Northern Guard Supporters are an independent supporters group for Detroit City FC (DCFC) of USL W League and of the USL Championship. DCFC’s men’s side formerly played in the National Premier Soccer League's (NPSL) Midwestern Conference before joining NISA in 2019, and women's side formerly playing in the United Women's Soccer’s (UWS) Midwest Conference.

The Northern Guard have received national and international attention in the soccer community for their passionate and creative support in the stands at DCFC's home Keyworth Stadium that exceeds support traditionally associated with the fourth tier of soccer in the United States. The former commissioner of the NPSL, Michael Hitchcock, called the atmosphere created by the Northern Guard "one of my U.S. soccer highlights" and an "incredible experience." and Sean Spence, the editor of SB Nation's Chicago Fire blog, wrote that "When association football takes over the USA...It will be because of ultras like the Northern Guard, Detroit City FC's rabid, profane, hilarious supporters group."

== History ==
Founded in 2012 by brothers Gene and Ken Butcher, the Northern Guard brought drums, smoke bombs, flares and flags to the first-ever DCFC match to create an atmosphere similar to European supporter stands.

Over the course of two seasons, attendance in the supporters' stands at DCFC matches grew to fill the 800 person-capacity section and many more supporters began to bring their own drums, flags, smoke, and costumes to add to the atmosphere.

In June 2013, a pair of Northern Guard Supporters were married at midfield at halftime of a DCFC match.

== Traditions and controversies ==
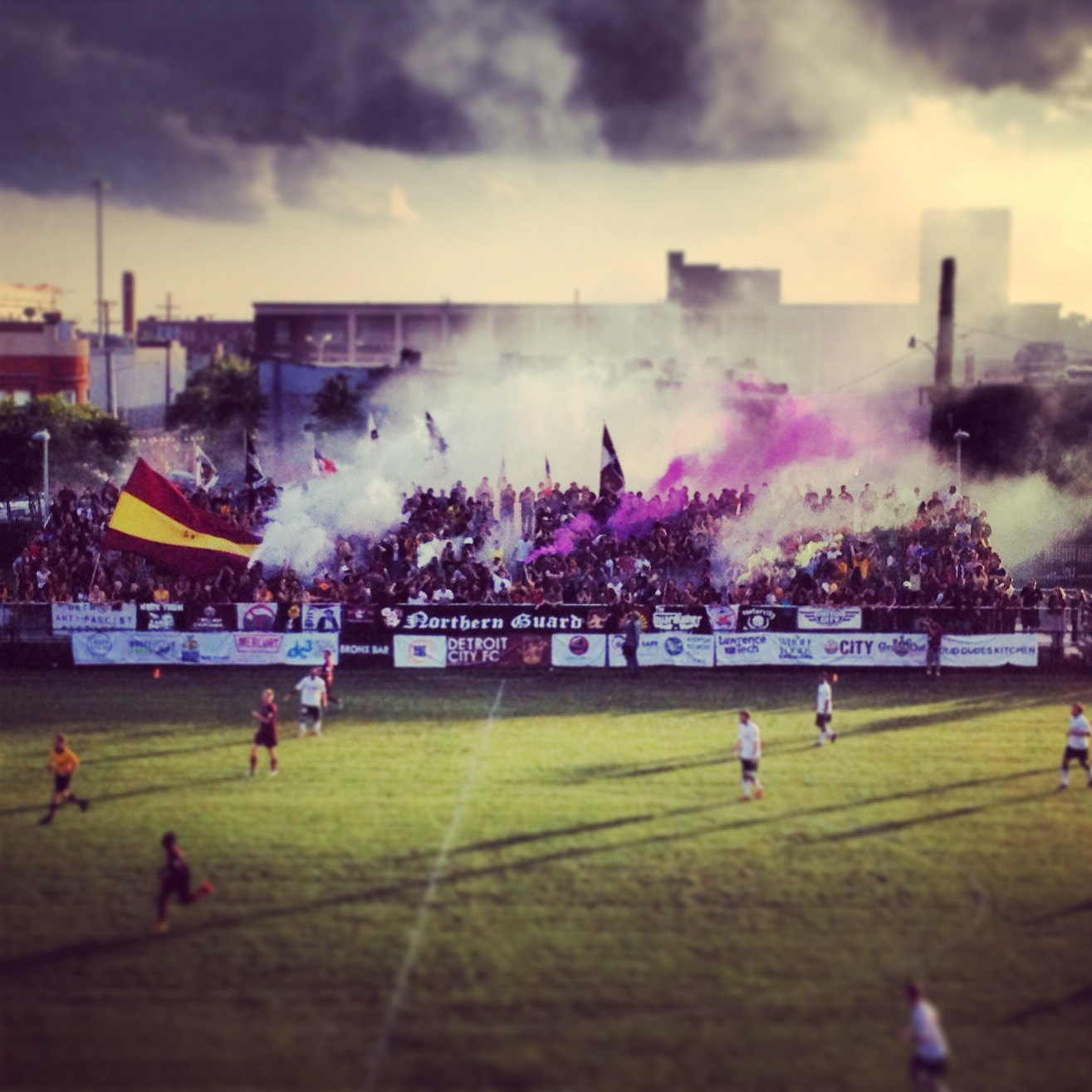
The Northern Guard celebrate a goal during a home game at Cass Tech

Many Northern Guard members wear skull facemasks and skulls are common symbols in the group's flags and apparel. Founder Ken Butcher explained, "We wore face masks that looked like skulls because we kept hearing that the city of Detroit was dead. Well, if we are dead, then we were gonna be the walking dead."

Before home matches, the Northern Guard gather at Fowling Warehouse in Hamtramck and march to the stadium, where they gather outside the stadium's gates and chant "Can you hear (opponent) sing? We don't hear a fucking thing."

As the opposing team enters the field, the Northern Guard chant "Come and get it," which has become the group's unofficial motto.

The Northern Guard are known for their use of smoke bombs, lighting dozens of large bombs a match in their stands, as well as for vulgarity and profanity. SB Nation soccer editor Sean Spence wrote that "...despite the presence of several families in their midst, they are loudly, hilariously vulgar, and use profanity with a ferociousness and familiarity that is almost admirable." (Spence also cautioned that "the Northern Guard is where family-friendly entertainment went slumming and got stomped biker-style into an intensive care ward.")

Once in each half, the Northern Guard will "Tetris" in the stands, linking arms and dancing side-to-side while singing the melody to "Korobeiniki," the theme song to the video game Tetris.

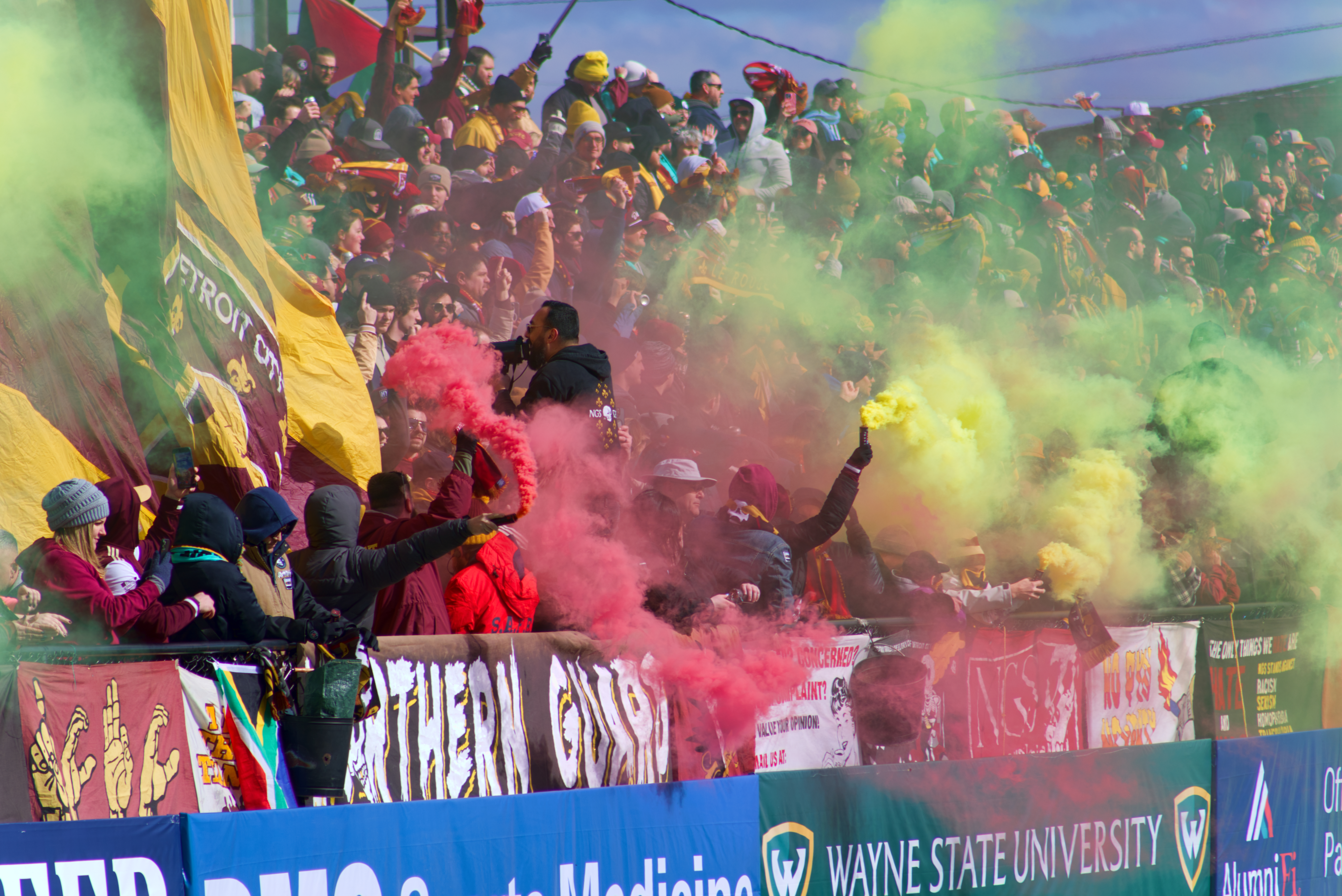
NGS @ Detroit City FC v Birmingham Legion FC 3/25

They have also adopted songs and chants that celebrate the group's unusually confrontational style for American lower-tier soccer supporters, including "No one likes us, we don't care" originally popularized by Millwall FC supporters and "We're ruining football and we don't care" from Manchester City FC's supporters.

The Northern Guard sing the first and last verses of The Pogues' arrangement of Ewan MacColl's song "Dirty Old Town." If the team is winning, the Northern Guard will sing in the 80th minute. If the team is losing or the score is even, the song is sung after the match.

The Northern Guard is notorious for chanting "Fuck Ohio", especially, but not exclusively, when playing against teams from that state. In the 2013–14 offseason, the Northern Guard offered a scarf for sale with the words "FUCK OHIO" on one side, which received attention in the U.S. soccer community when one was shown on the ESPN broadcast of the 2014 MLS All-Star Game. Before the 2014 season, DCFC ownership banned chants, signs, tifo and apparel (including the scarf) with "the F-word" from the stadium.

== Hooligans for Heroes ==
In 2012, members of the Northern Guard founded Hooligans for Heroes (H4H), a nonprofit that engages soccer supporters on behalf of wounded veterans of the United States Armed Forces. Detroit City FC ownership is supportive of H4H, and played a benefit match on Memorial Day of 2013 where DCFC players wore camouflage jerseys that were auctioned off after the match with proceeds going to the Wounded Warrior Project through H4H.

== John Bieniewicz Fundraising ==
On June 29, 2014, soccer referee John Bieniewicz was assaulted by Baseel Abdul Amir Saad, a player in an amateur match he was officiating in the suburbs of Detroit. Bieniewicz died two days later of his injuries, and Saad was charged with second-degree murder. A memorial fund was set up to support Bieniewicz's family, and at Detroit City FC's next home match, the Northern Guard passed around a "swear jar" to raise donations for the fund, playing on their reputation for profane language during matches. The Northern Guard also organized a minute of silence in Bieniewicz's memory in the match's 44th minute, during which they held up red cards in symbolic rejection of violence against officials. Through these efforts, the Northern Guard raised more than $3,000 that was then matched by Detroit City FC ownership for a total donation of $6,560 to the memorial fund.
