= Terri L. Jewell =

American poet, Black lesbian activist (1954–1995)

- Born: Terri Lynn Jewell; October 4, 1954; Louisville, Kentucky, U.S.
- Died: November 26, 1995 (aged 41); Lansing, Michigan, U.S.
- Education: Montclair State College
- Occupations: Poet, Black lesbian activist, author
- Partner: Stephanie Byrd

Terri Lynn Jewell (October 4, 1954 – November 26, 1995) was an American author, poet and Black lesbian activist. She was the editor of The Black Woman’s Gumbo Ya-Ya, which received the New York City Library Young Persons Reading Award in 1994.

== Early life ==
Jewell was born on October 4, 1954, in Louisville, Kentucky, the only daughter of Mildred (Midge) and Miller LaRue Jewell Jr. She had a half-brother, Marcus Tandy.

In 1968, Jewell won first prize, a $25 savings bond, in the third annual Negro History Essay Contest, sponsored by the Louisville, Kentucky chapter of the Links, Inc.

Jewell spent two years majoring in biology at the University of Louisville before transferring to another college. She graduated in 1979 from Montclair State College in New Jersey with a Bachelors of Science degree in health education.

She became politically active in the women's movement in New York while attending Montclair State College. She participated in marches and readings dealing with feminist issues. During her college years, Jewell acknowledged she was a lesbian. She wrote about coming out to her mother in her 1990 article "A Short Account of My Behavior." In 1985, Jewell outlined the political, class and other challenges experienced by a Black lesbian in a relationship with a white woman in "An Alliance of Differences".

== Career ==
Jewell's poetry and critical essays appeared in over 300 publications in the United States and internationally. These included The African-American Review, The Black Scholar, Black Maria, Body Politic, Calyx, Common Lives/Lesbian Lives, Kalliope, The Lavender Letter, Obsidian II, OutWeek, Poetry Detroit, Sing Heavenly Muse, Sisterlode, Spare Rib, Sinister Wisdom, Violent Virgins, and Women of Power.

In 1993, she was one of the first people to publish a biography and critical essay about writer Sapphire.

In about 1989/1990, Jewell interviewed Ruth Ellis, an African-American woman who became widely known as the oldest surviving open lesbian, for the publication Piece of My Heart: A Lesbian of Colour Anthology.

== Publications ==
Books by Terri L. Jewell
Title	Published	Publisher	OCLC	Notes
The Black Woman's Gumbo Ya-Ya: Quotations by Black Women	1993	Crossing Press (Freedom, CA)	OCLC 28424061	Features words, thoughts, observations, poems, lyrics and proverbs from 350 black women worldwide.
Succulent Heretic: Poetry	1994	Opal Tortuga Press (Lansing, MI)	OCLC 32405266	Poems explicitly discuss mental health.
Our Names Are Many: The Black Woman's Book of Days	1996	Crossing Press (Freedom, CA)	OCLC 35653162	

Jewell's poems and essays were also published in journals and anthologies including:

- "Barbara Smith and Kitchen Table Women of Color Press" Hot Wire: The Journal of Women's Music and Culture (May 1990), pages 20–22, 58.
- "Interview with Stephanie Byrd" (essay) in Does Your Mama Know?: An Anthology of Black Lesbian Coming Out Stories (1997), pages 129–138.
- "Investment of Worth" (poem) in When I Am An Old Woman I Shall Wear Purple (1991), page 76.
- "Spiderplant' (poem) in If I Had My Life to Live Over, I Would Pick More Daisies (1992), page 48.

== Awards ==
Jewell was the recipient of several awards and honors, including:

- The Prism Award (1994) in recognition of Jewell's work in the Lansing, Michigan gay and lesbian community
- The National Women's Music Festival and Writers Conference Board of Directors Award (1990)
- The American Society for Aging Poetry Competition (1988)
- The Michigan "New Voices" State Poetry Competition (1986)
- The Kentucky Poetry Society Competition (1983)

== Death ==
Jewell was diagnosed as manic-depressive and at times was hospitalized to "renew" herself. She wrote about being a survivor of incest, and experienced flashbacks about violence involving family members.

On November 26, 1995, Jewell's body was found at Michigan Park in Ionia County. The medical examiner listed the cause of death as a self-inflicted gunshot wound.

In 1993, the Arts Foundations of Michigan had awarded Jewell a $1,150 grant to support new poetry about African American poet, writer and activist James Baldwin. "She was on the verge of a great breakthrough with the James Baldwin poems she was writing...She would read me parts... It was an amazing work," according to Michigan State University colleague and author Lev Raphael. At the time of Jewell's death, her manuscript of poems about Baldwin was unpublished.

At the time of her death, Jewell had also been editing Dreadsisters, Lock-Sisters; a collection of writings by and about dreadwomen. Additionally, she had been an active member of the editorial board of The Lesbian Review of Books since its inception.

== Archival resources ==
The Terri L. Jewell papers (1968–1996) are at Michigan State University. The collection, approximately 15.6 linear feet of materials, consists of manuscripts of poetry, manuscripts of anthology projects, notebooks, reviews, interviews, research material, photographs, correspondence, obituary, and memorial program. The collection was donated by Lee Michael Sayles in 1996, with an accrual donated in 2018.

== Influences ==
Amber L. Katherine, who wrote her dissertation about the implications of feminist Audre Lorde's open letter to Mary Daly regarding Daly's Gyn/Ecology: The Metaethics of Radical Feminism, noted that she shared the subject of her dissertation with Jewell, who "was encouraging and affirmed the importance of the project." Katherine noted that Jewell's affirmation "was vitally important" because Katherine "loved [Jewell's] work and because of the kinship between [Jewell's] work and Audre Lorde's." Katherine mentions wanting to understand why Jewell thought Katherine's dissertation would be important, but was hesitant to ask her. After Jewell's death, Katerine felt she found the answer in Jewell's poem "Show You Here."

Valerie Jean, an African American poet, writes about her five-year correspondence with Jewell, their mutual admiration for Audre Lorde, and the personal impact Jewell's death had on Jean's writing and life.

Lisa C. Moore, the founder and editor of RedBone Press, dedicated Does Your Mama Know?: An Anthology of Black Lesbian Coming Out Stories "In memory of Terri Jewell, who lit a fire in my heart and under my butt and kept me going."

In 2018, Voices of the Revolution, a spoken word group, formed by Susan Harris, Laurie Hollinger, and TariMuñiz, celebrated the work of Pat Parker, Terri Jewell, June Jordan, and other powerful, revolutionary women at the 33rd Annual Women in the Arts Festival held at the Edgewood United Church in East Lansing, Michigan.

In 2019, Su Penn led a discussion on Jewell's life at the 34th Annual Women in the Arts Festival held at the Edgewood United Church in East Lansing, Michigan.

== See also ==
- List of feminist poets
