= Darren Smith (footballer, born 1996) =

South African soccer player (born 1996)

Personal information
- Date of birth: 26 March 1996 (age 30)
- Place of birth: Cape Town, South Africa
- Height: 1.76 m (5 ft 9 in)
- Position: Forward

Team information
- Current team: Detroit City
- Number: 7

Youth career
- –2014: Ajax Cape Town

Senior career*
Years	Team	Apps	(Gls)
2014–2016	AmaZulu	3	(0)
2015–2016	→ Vasco da Gama (loan)	21	(2)
2016–2017	Santos	13	(3)
2017–2019	SuperSport United	5	(1)
2019	→ Ubuntu Cape Town (loan)	10	(0)
2020	EIF	22	(18)
2021	Honka	24	(8)
2022	AS FAR	9	(1)
2023–2024	Inter Turku	53	(17)
2025–	Detroit City	55	(24)
- * Club domestic league appearances and goals as of November 4, 2026

Darren Smith (born 26 March 1996) is a South African professional soccer player who plays for Detroit City in USL Championship. Smith started in a youth sector of Ajax Cape Town, before joining Kwazulu-Natal club AmaZulu in 2014.

== Career ==
=== South Africa ===
Smith started his senior career in his native South Africa with AmaZulu in 2014. During his six professional years in his native country, he played mostly in second tier National First Division, and additionally made a total of six appearances and scored once in first tier South African Premier Division. He represented Vasco da Gama, Santos, SuperSport United and Ubuntu Cape Town between 2015 and 2019. In the 2017–18 season while playing with SuperSport United, Smith represented his club at CAF Confederation Cup matches. His contract with SuperSport was terminated in late 2019.

=== Ekenäs IF ===
In early 2020, Smith moved abroad for the first time, and after a trial with IFK Mariehamn, he signed a contract with Finnish club Ekenäs IF (EIF), playing in the country's second-tier Ykkönen. In his first season abroad, which was affected by the COVID-19 pandemic, Smith scored 18 goals in 22 matches, making him the top goalscorer in the division. He was named the Ykkönen Player of the Year.

=== Honka ===
On 11 November 2020, Honka in Finnish premier division Veikkausliiga announced the signing of Smith for the 2021 season. Smith made 24 appearances in the league, scoring eight goals. He also represented Honka in the 2021–22 UEFA Europa Conference League qualifiers in four matches. However, he asked the club not to exercise his option and left Honka after the season.

=== AS FAR ===
In early 2022, Smith signed with Moroccan club AS FAR Rabat, playing in Botola Pro, the country's premier division, becoming the first South African football player to sign with a Moroccan club. In May 2022, Smith won the title of the postponed 2019–20 Moroccan Throne Cup with AS FAR.

=== Inter Turku ===
In November 2022, Smith returned to Finland and signed a two-year deal with Inter Turku in Veikkausliiga, starting in 2023. During his first season with the club, Smith scored eight goals in 27 league appearances. In the 2024 Finnish League Cup, Smith scored five goals in six cup matches as Inter Turku won its second Finnish League Cup title on 30 March 2024, by defeating KuPS on penalties in the final. Smith also scored five goals in six matches in the club's 2024 Finnish Cup campaign, as Inter reached the Finnish Cup final in September, where they eventually fell short to KuPS 2–1.

=== Detroit City ===
On 29 January 2025, Smith signed for Detroit City in USL Championship on a two-year deal. On 12 April, in an away match against Phoenix Rising, Smith scored a brace for Detroit late in the game as a substitute, helping his side to win the match 3–2, after having trailed 2–0.

== Personal life ==
Smith was born to a Christian family in Cape Town, South Africa. At the age of 16, Smith suffered a tragic loss when his older brother Keenan was killed in a traffic accident, when a bus driver ran red lights and fatally crashed his car.

While living in South Africa, Smith's other sport was track and field, and especially hurdling. He has also studied to become a personal trainer. After his contract termination with SuperSport and before moving to Finland, Smith worked as a model in commercials.

Smith is married to Courteney and the couple have a child, a daughter named Uriah, who was born in Turku, Finland.

== Career statistics ==
As of 22 July 2025

Appearances and goals by club, season and competition
Club	Season	League			National cup (Note: Includes Nedbank Cup, Suomen Cup, Moroccan Throne Cup, and U.S. Open Cup)		League cup (Note: Includes Finnish League Cup and USL Cup)		Continental		Total	
Club	Season	Division	Apps	Goals	Apps	Goals	Apps	Goals	Apps	Goals	Apps	Goals
AmaZulu	2014–15	South African Premiership	1	0	0	0	0	0	—		1	0
AmaZulu	2015–16	NFD	2	0	0	0	—		—		2	0
AmaZulu	Total		3	0	0	0	0	0	0	0	3	0
Vasco da Gama (loan)	2014–15	NFD	12	1	4	0	—		—		16	1
Vasco da Gama (loan)	2015–16	NFD	9	1	0	0	—		—		9	1
Vasco da Gama (loan)	Total		21	2	4	0	0	0	0	0	25	2
Santos	2016–17	NFD	13	3	1	0	—		—		14	3
SuperSport United	2017–18	South African Premiership	5	1	1	0	0	0	3 (Note: Appearance(s) in CAF Confederation Cup)	0	9	1
SuperSport United	2018–19	South African Premiership	0	0	0	0	0	0	0	0	0	0
SuperSport United	Total		5	1	1	0	0	0	3	0	9	1
Ubuntu Cape Town (loan)	2018–19	NFD	10	0	0	0	—		—		10	0
EIF	2020	Ykkönen	22	18	5	3	—		—		27	21
Honka	2021	Veikkausliiga	24	8	6	2	—		4 (Note: Appearance(s) in UEFA Europa Conference League)	0	34	10
AS FAR Rabat	2021–22	Botola Pro	9	1	2	0	—		0	0	11	1
Inter Turku	2023	Veikkausliiga	27	8	1	0	6	1	—		34	9
Inter Turku	2024	Veikkausliiga	26	9	6	5	6	5	—		38	19
Inter Turku	Total		53	17	7	5	12	6	0	0	72	28
Detroit City	2025	USL Championship	17	7	2	1	3	2	–		22	10
Career total			177	57	29	11	15	8	7	0	228	76

== Honours ==
AS FAR

- Moroccan Throne Cup: 2019–20

Inter Turku

- Finnish Cup runner-up: 2024
- Finnish League Cup: 2024

Individual

- Ykkönen Player of the year: 2020
- Ykkönen Top Goalscorer: 2020
