= Alex Dalou =

American soccer player (born 2000)

Personal information
- Full name: Alexander Marcus Dalou
- Date of birth: August 24, 2000 (age 26)
- Place of birth: West Bloomfield, Michigan, United States
- Height: 1.70 m (5 ft 7 in)
- Position: Midfielder

Team information
- Current team: Detroit City
- Number: 15

Youth career
- 2008–2018: Michigan Jaguars
- 2014–2018: Walled Lake Central Vikings

College career
Years	Team	Apps	(Gls)
2018	Schoolcraft Ocelots	13	(8)

Senior career*
Years	Team	Apps	(Gls)
2021	Oakland County	4	(1)
2021–2022	Achyronas Liopetriou	11	(0)
2022	Oakland County	9	(3)
2023	Gold Star Detroit	10	(2)
2023	Albion San Diego	9	(2)
2024–2025	FC Tulsa	53	(4)
2026–	Detroit City	22	(0)
- * Club domestic league appearances and goals as of November 4, 2026

Alexander Marcus Dalou (born August 24, 2000) is an American soccer player who plays for Detroit City in the USL Championship.

== Early career ==
Dalou played club soccer with the Michigan Jaguars youth program from ages 8–18. He played on the Michigan Jaguars 00 Green team that was the Region II champions in both 2017 and 2018, making it to the US Youth Nationals. He also played for his high school, Walled Lake Central High School, captaining the team for both his junior and senior years and earning Second Team All-State recognition. He was recruited by and initially committed to Western Michigan University, but ultimately ended up attending Schoolcraft College in 2018. Dalou scored eight goals in 13 appearances in his single season with the Ocelots, where he received first-team All-MCCAA honors, was recognized as the MCCAA Player of the Year and the MCCAA Freshman of the Year, and was named to the NJCAA Division III All-Region Team.

== Senior career ==
In 2021, Dalou joined USL League Two side Oakland County FC, making four appearances and scoring one goal.

Dalou moved to the Cyprus second division with newly promoted Achyronas Liopetriou for the 2021–22 season, where he appeared in 11 games.

He returned to the United States and Oakland County FC for the 2022 season, making nine appearances and scoring three goals.

=== NISA ===
In 2023, Dalou joined NISA with the newly formed Gold Star FC Detroit. Midway through the season, he moved to the west coast with another NISA team, Albion San Diego. He appeared in ten games and nine games respectively, scoring two goals for each team.

=== FC Tulsa ===
Dalou joined USL Championship club FC Tulsa as a trialist for their 2024 season, performing well enough to earn a spot on the team, and appeared in 22 games throughout the season. His performance earned him another year with Tulsa, who re-signed him for 2025. He appeared in 31 games and contributed four goals during the season, helping the team to first place in the Western Conference, and to the USL Championship playoff finals.

=== Detroit City FC ===
In 2026, Dalou switched USL Championship conferences and made a return to his home state, joining Detroit City FC for the 2026 season with an option for 2027.
