= Kian Williams =

English footballer (born 2000)

Personal information
- Full name: Kian Paul James Williams
- Date of birth: 1 July 2000 (age 26)
- Place of birth: Leicester, England
- Height: 1.83 m (6 ft 0 in)
- Position: Midfielder

Team information
- Current team: Detroit City (on loan from Indy Eleven)
- Number: 23

Youth career
- Leicester City

Senior career*
Years	Team	Apps	(Gls)
2018–2019	Leicester City	0	(0)
2018	→ Barwell (loan)	3	(0)
2019	→ Stratford Town (loan)	10	(0)
2019	Magni Grenivík	14	(5)
2019	Stratford Town	0	(0)
2020–2022	Keflavík	52	(11)
2023–2025	Valour FC	34	(6)
2026–	Indy Eleven	5	(0)
2026–	→ Detroit City (loan)	9	(1)
- * Club domestic league appearances and goals as of November 4, 2026

Kian Paul James Williams (born 1 July 2000) is an English footballer who plays as a midfielder for Detroit City FC in the USL Championship on loan from Indy Eleven.

== Early life ==
Williams played in the Leicester City youth system from the U10 level through to the U21s.

== Career ==
In August 2018, Leicester City sent him on loan to Barwell in the seventh tier Southern Football League Premier Division Central. In January 2019, he went on loan to Stratford Town also in the seventh tier Southern Football League Premier Division Central.

In August 2019, Williams joined Icelandic club Magni Grenivík in the second tier 1. deild karla. Three months later, following the season, he returned to England.

In October 2019, he returned to Stratford Town.

In February 2020, he signed with Keflavík ÍF in the Icelandic second tier. He helped them earn promotion to the top tier Úrvalsdeild and signed an extension through 2022. After the 2022 season, he departed the club. Afterwards, he returned to England and was training with Burton Albion.

In December 2022, he signed with Canadian Premier League club Valour FC for the 2023 season. Cavalry FC had also been interested in signing Williams, but he chose to join Valour. He scored his first CPL goal on 30 April in a 1-1 draw against Cavalry. After beginning the season as a winger, he transitioned to the striker role late in the season. In 2023, he finished tied for the team lead in goals with four and led the team in assists with five. In February 2024, he signed an extension with the club through the 2025 season. Before the beginning of the 2024 season, he tore his ACL, requiring three surguries and causing him to miss the entire season. On 1 October 2025, he agreed to a mutual termination of the remainder of his contract with the club.

In January 2026, Williams joined Indy Eleven in the USL Championship. In August, 2026 Detroit City FC announced they had acquired Williams on loan from Indy Eleven for the reminder of the 2026 USL Championship season.
