= Chisom Egbuchulam =

Nigerian footballer (born 1992)

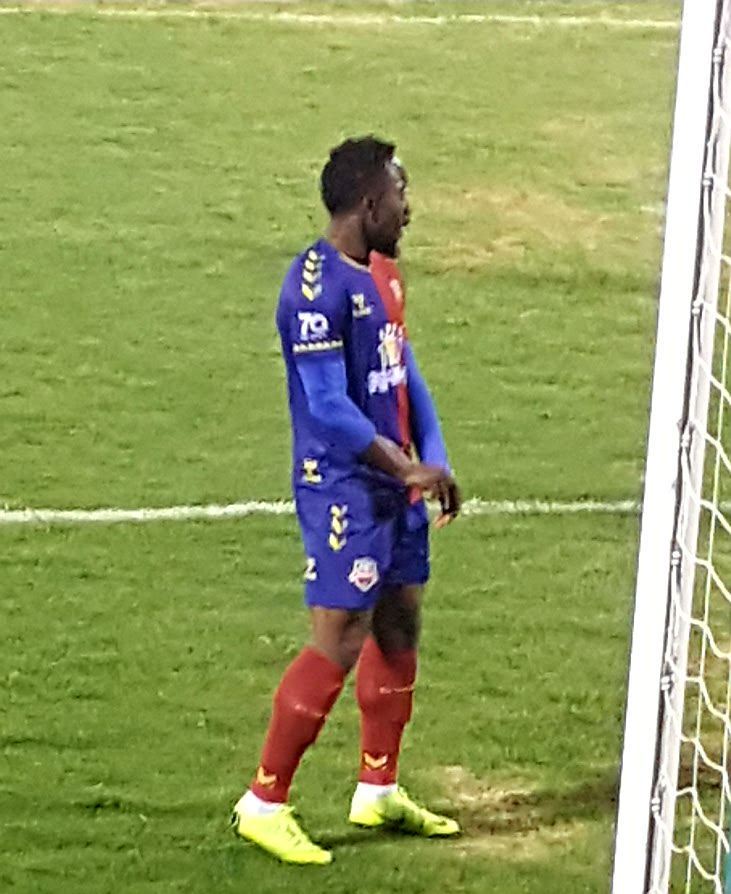

Personal information
- Date of birth: 22 February 1992 (age 34)
- Place of birth: Enugu, Nigeria
- Height: 1.75 m (5 ft 9 in)
- Position: Striker

Team information
- Current team: Detroit City FC
- Number: 26

Senior career*
Years	Team	Apps	(Gls)
2013–2018	Enugu Rangers		
2017	→ BK Häcken (loan)	10	(0)
2018	Falkenberg	26	(14)
2019	Suwon FC	33	(18)
2020–2023	Meizhou Hakka	71	(27)
2023	Sichuan Jiuniu	18	(9)
2024	Hatta	10	(5)
2024–2026	Al-Jandal		
2026–	Detroit City FC	13	(2)
- * Club domestic league appearances and goals as of November 4, 2026

Chisom Egbuchulam (born 22 February 1992) is a Nigerian professional footballer who plays as a striker for American club Detroit City FC.

== Club career ==
Egbuchulam moved on loan from Enugu Rangers to Swedish club BK Häcken in February 2017. He signed for Falkenberg in April 2018. In January 2019 he moved to South Korean club Suwon FC.

In January 2020 he signed for Meizhou Hakka. He would go on to be utilized as a vital member of the team that gained promotion to the top tier after coming second within the division at the end of the 2021 China League One campaign.

On 1 July 2023, Egbuchulam joined China League One club Sichuan Jiuniu.

On 9 February 2024, Egbuchulam joined UAE Pro League club Hatta.

On 6 August 2024, Egbuchulam joined Saudi First Division club Al-Jandal.

On 20 February 2026, Egbuchlam joined USL Championship club Detroit City FC.

== International career ==
In October 2016, Egbuchulam was called up to the Nigeria senior squad and was an unused substitute as the Super Eagles beat Zambia 2–1.

== Career statistics ==
As of 22 March 2024.

Club	Season	League			National Cup		Continental		Other		Total	
Club	Season	Division	Apps	Goals	Apps	Goals	Apps	Goals	Apps	Goals	Apps	Goals
BK Häcken (loan)	2017	Allsvenskan	10	0	1	0	-		-		11	0
BK Häcken (loan)	2018	Allsvenskan	0	0	1	3	0	0	-		1	3
BK Häcken (loan)	Total		10	0	2	3	0	0	0	0	12	3
Falkenberg	2018	Superettan	26	14	0	0	-		-		26	14
Falkenberg	2019	Allsvenskan	0	0	1	2	-		-		1	2
Falkenberg	Total		26	14	1	2	0	0	0	0	27	16
Suwon FC	2019	K League 2	33	18	1	2	-		-		34	20
Meizhou Hakka	2020	China League One	13	4	0	0	-		-		13	4
Meizhou Hakka	2021	China League One	33	20	0	0	-		-		33	20
Meizhou Hakka	2022	Chinese Super League	19	3	1	5	-		-		20	8
Meizhou Hakka	2023	Chinese Super League	6	0	0	0	-		-		6	0
Meizhou Hakka	Total		71	27	1	5	0	0	0	0	72	32
Sichuan Jiuniu	2023	China League One	18	9	0	0	-		-		18	9
Hatta	2023–24	UAE Pro League	2	2	0	0	-		-		2	2
Career total			160	70	5	12	0	0	0	0	165	82

== Honours ==
=== Club ===
Enugu Rangers

- Nigeria Premier League: 2016
