= Haruki Yamazaki =

Japanese footballer (born 2000)

Haruki Yamazaki 山﨑 晴紀
Personal information
- Date of birth: 11 December 2000 (age 25)
- Place of birth: Nara, Japan
- Height: 1.78 m (5 ft 10 in)
- Positions: Defender; midfielder

Team information
- Current team: Detroit City
- Number: 14

College career
Years	Team	Apps	(Gls)
2020–2021	Northwest Trappers	8	(5)
2021–2022	Davis & Elkins Senators	42	(11)
2023	Oral Roberts Golden Eagles	16	(2)

Senior career*
Years	Team	Apps	(Gls)
2022	Asheville City	9	(1)
2024	Northern Colorado Hailstorm	20	(1)
2025–	Detroit City	51	(0)
- * Club domestic league appearances and goals as of 31 October 2026

Haruki Yamazaki (山﨑 晴紀, Yamazaki Haruki; born 11 December 2000) is a Japanese professional footballer who plays for Detroit City FC in the USL Championship.

== College career ==
Yamazaki began playing soccer in the United States for the 2020–21 season, his sophomore year of college, at Northwest College in Wyoming. While there, he led the team in scoring with 5 goals.

Beginning with his junior year, Yamazaki transferred to Davis & Elkins College, where he participated in both the 2021 and 2022 seasons. In the 2021 season, he helped the team to the finals of the Mountain East Conference Men's Soccer Tournament, as well as the last 16 of the NCAA Division II Men's Soccer Championship, in which they drew 0–0 against University of Charleston before being eliminated on PKs. In both seasons, he earned All-MEC First Team honors. Additionally in 2021, he was named to the All-MEC Tournament Team.

Yamazaki maintained eligibility for an additional senior year, and transferred to Oral Roberts University for his final college season in 2023. He once again received First Team honors, this time with the Summit League

== Club career ==
=== Asheville City ===
Yamazaki joined Asheville City SC of USL League 2 on an amateur contract for the 2022 season, between his time at Davis & Elkins and Oral Roberts. While there, he helped them to a second place finish in the South Central division, and the Southern Conference semi-finals in the USL League 2 playoffs.

=== Northern Colorado Hailstorm ===
Coming off of a positive 2023 season with Oral Roberts, Yamazaki signed his first professional contract with Northern Colorado Hailstorm FC for the 2024 season, at the time competing in USL League 1. He played in 11 of 22 games in the regular season, with the team finishing in second. He also played in the first 9 of 10 matches of the inaugural USL Cup, en route to the team winning the competition.

On 14 November 2024, USL announced that they had terminated Northern Colorado Hailstorm's franchise agreement, making Yamazaki a free agent.

=== Detroit City ===
Yamazaki joined Detroit City FC of the USL Championship for the 2025 season, with a club option for 2026. Playing well through 22 games across all competition, that option was exercised for the '26 season and announced as part of DCFC's first wave of roster construction for that season, along with 12 other players.

On October 10th, 2026, Yamazaki was named the 2026 Black Arrow Award recipient as Detroit City FC MVP.
