= Carlos Saldaña (footballer) =

American soccer player (born 1996)

Personal information
- Full name: Carlos Alberto Saldaña Moreno
- Date of birth: October 27, 1996 (age 30)
- Place of birth: Vallejo, California
- Height: 1.88 m (6 ft 2 in)
- Position: Goalkeeper

Team information
- Current team: Detroit City
- Number: 91

Youth career
- 2011–2014: De Anza Force
- 2014–2020: Guadalajara

Senior career*
Years	Team	Apps	(Gls)
2016–2019	Guadalajara Premier	30	(0)
2019–2020	→ Tepatitlán (loan)	2	(0)
2020	Halcones de Zapopan		
2021–2023	Sacramento Republic	22	(0)
2024–	Detroit City	30	(0)
- * Club domestic league appearances and goals as of October 31, 2026

Carlos Alberto Saldaña Moreno (Note: In this Spanish name, the first or paternal surname is Saldaña and the second or maternal family name is Moreno.) (born 27 October 1996) is an American professional soccer player who currently plays for Detroit City in the USL Championship.

== Career ==
Saldaña was born in Vallejo, California, but spent time in both America and El Nayar, Nayarit throughout his childhood.

Saldaña played with USSDA club side De Anza Force before he joined the Guadalajara academy, where he played at various levels, including 30 regular season appearances for the club's Guadalajara Premier side until it disbanded in 2019. In 2019, he led Chivas to the reserve league finals, only to fall on aggregate. He also spent time on loan with Liga de Expansión MX side Tepatitlán.

In July 2020, Saldaña signed with Club Halcones de Zapopan during their inaugural season in the newly formed Liga de Balompié Mexicano, which would be the club's only season in the league.

On September 15, 2021, Saldaña signed with USL Championship side Sacramento Republic for the remainder of the season. He left Sacramento following their 2023 season.

On 30 January 2024, Saldaña signed with USL Championship club Detroit City for their upcoming 2024 season.
