= Kobe Hernandez-Foster =

American soccer player (born 2002)

Personal information
- Full name: Kobe Andre Hernandez-Foster
- Date of birth: June 26, 2002 (age 24)
- Place of birth: Los Angeles, California, United States
- Height: 5 ft 9 in (1.75 m)
- Position: Defensive midfielder

Team information
- Current team: Detroit City
- Number: 22

Youth career
- 2016–2020: LA Galaxy
- 2020–2021: VfL Wolfsburg

Senior career*
Years	Team	Apps	(Gls)
2018–2020	LA Galaxy II	3	(0)
2021	VfL Wolfsburg	0	(0)
2022–2023	HamKam	35	(1)
2024–2025	Birmingham Legion	49	(2)
2025	Las Vegas Lights	0	(0)
2025–	Detroit City	42	(4)

International career^{‡}
2018–2019	United States U17	23	(3)
- * Club domestic league appearances and goals as of November 4, 2026 ‡ National team caps and goals as of October 27, 2024

Kobe Andre Hernandez-Foster (born June 26, 2002) is an American soccer player who currently plays for Detroit City. Besides the United States, he has played in Germany for VfL Wolfsburg in the German Bundesliga.

== Club career ==
Hernandez-Foster joined LA Galaxy's academy in 2016 and appeared for Galaxy's USL side LA Galaxy II as an injury-time substitute during a 3–1 loss to OKC Energy on September 12, 2018.

On July 13, 2020, it was announced that Hernandez-Foster, along with fellow United States youth national teamer Bryang Kayo, signed with VfL Wolfsburg of the German Bundesliga. It was announced that Hernandez-Foster would begin playing with the club's U-19 team.

Hernandez-Foster trained with Norwegian club HamKam during the autumn of 2021, but was not signed due to the team having a foreign player limit. After the team secured promotion to Eliteserien they signed him on a two-year deal on November 4, 2021.

On March 12, 2024, Hernandez-Foster returned to the United States, signing with USL Championship side Birmingham Legion. On July 26, 2025, Hernandez-Foster was transferred to Las Vegas Lights, but five days later was transferred to Detroit City.

== International career ==
Hernandez-Foster was born in the United States to a Honduran father and Guatemalan mother. In October 2019, he was named to the United States squad for the 2019 FIFA U-17 World Cup in Brazil.

== Honors ==
Individual

- CONCACAF U-17 Championship Best XI: 2019
