= Ruth Ellis Center =

Detroit area social services agency

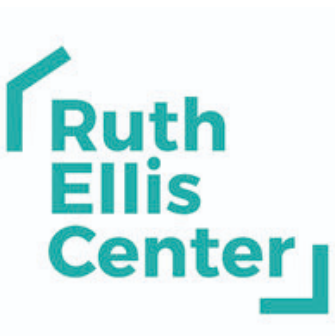
- Ruth Ellis Center logo
- Founded: 1999
- Purpose: Runaway, homeless and at-risk LGBTQ youth
- Location: Detroit, Michigan
- Region served: Southeast Michigan
- Services: Drop-in center, street outreach program, transitional living, and emergency housing shelter
- Key people: Mark Erwin, executive director
- Website: www.ruthelliscenter.org

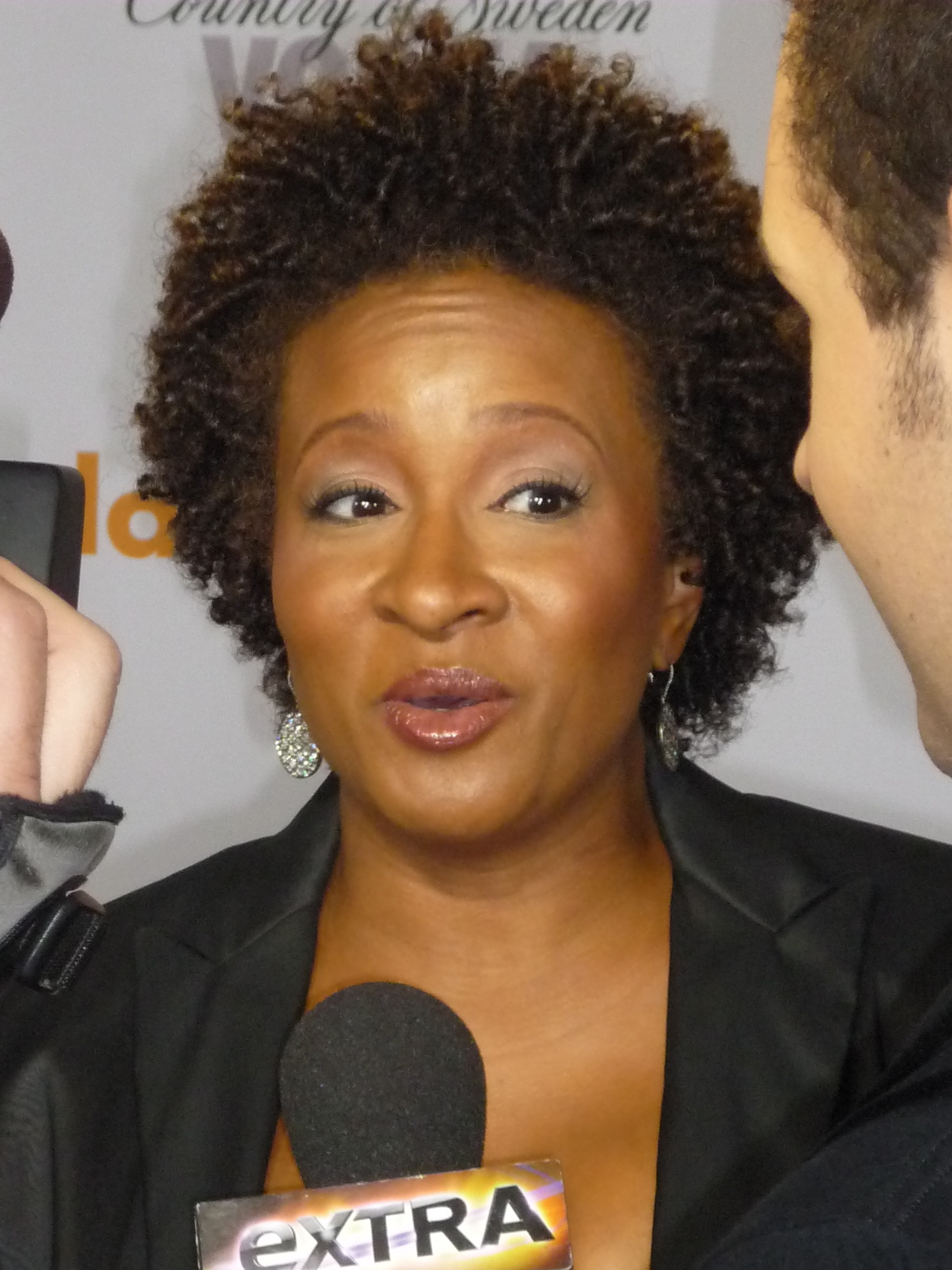
Wanda Sykes, a public supporter of Ruth Ellis Center since 2010, at the 2010 GLAAD Media Awards.

The Ruth Ellis Center (REC) is an American social services agency in the Detroit area that serves the needs of runaway, homeless and at-risk lesbian, gay, bisexual, and transgender (LGBTQ) youth. REC is named in honor of the life and work of Ruth Ellis, who was an African-American lesbian from Detroit known for her service to people in need.

== Programs ==
The Ruth Ellis Center operates five main programs: Youth Programs (Health, Equity, and Outreach, formally Drop-In; and Center for Lesbian Queer Women & Girls or CLQ), Supportive Housing, Integrated Health Services, Community-Based Family Support Services, and the Ruth Ellis Institute.

== History ==
A group of community activists including John Allen, Kofi Adoma, and Courtney Wilson - founded the Ruth Ellis Center in 1999, the same year Ruth Ellis celebrated her 100th birthday. In September 2000, the then-101-year-old Ellis attended the grand opening of the center's first phase, a drop-in center for at-risk youth.

Wanda Sykes has been an outspoken supporter of the organization after the staff sent her a letter asking her to visit during her 2010 tour's stop in Detroit.

In January 2022, it opened the 44,000-square-foot (4,100 m^{2}) Ruth Ellis Clairmount Center, a center for LGBT people aged 13 to 30, including housing and educational facilities. It cost approximately $15 million.

== See also ==
- LGBTQ rights in Michigan
- Homelessness among LGBT youth in the United States
