= 2026 Sporting Club Jacksonville season =

Season of a professional football team

Sporting Club Jacksonville
2026 season
- Owner: Ricky Caplin (majority); Tony Allegretti; Steve Livingstone
- Manager: Liam Fox
- Stadium: Hodges Stadium
- USLC: TBD
- USL Cup: Group stage
Home colors	Away colors	Third colors

The 2026 Sporting Club Jacksonville season is the club's inaugural season in the USL Championship, the second tier of professional soccer in the United States.

The club began play after first being founded in August 2022. In November 2025, the club's first manager, Liam Fox of Scotland, was hired after serving as an interim coach for the Hearts of Midlothian.

== Roster ==
As of March 13, 2026

Note: Flags indicate national team as defined under FIFA eligibility rules; some limited exceptions apply. Players may hold more than one non-FIFA nationality.

No.	Pos.	Nation	Player
1	GK	USA	Jake McGuire
2	DF	IRL	Harvey Neville
3	DF	USA	Tyshawn Rose
4	DF	USA	Ethan Dudley
5	MF	USA	Piero Elias
6	MF	ENG	Jordan Rossiter
7	FW	ENG	Jacob Evans
8	MF	USA	Wan Kuzain
9	FW	USA	Adam Luckhurst
10	MF	IRL	Kieran Sadlier
11	MF	PLE	Ahmad Al-Qaq
12	DF	VEN	Edgardo Rito
14	FW	CAN	Adonijah Reid

No.	Pos.	Nation	Player
15	DF	ENG	Ryan Edwards
16	FW	FIN	Emil Jääskeläinen
17	FW	USA	Zeke Soto
18	DF	GHA	Wahab Ackwei
19	MF	ENG	Rafferty Pedder
22	DF	USA	Antonio Gomez (on loan from Austin FC II)
24	MF	USA	Thomas Roberts
26	MF	USA	Luc Granitur
31	GK	USA	Christian Olivares (on loan from St. Louis City SC)
32	MF	LBR	Brem Soumaoro
42	GK	COL	Esteban Casas
77	DF	USA	Dida Armstrong
99	DF	SEN	Mohamed Traore

== Competitions ==
=== USL Championship ===
==== Standings — Eastern Conference ====
Pos	Team	Pld	W	L	T	GF	GA	GD	Pts
9	Indy Eleven	30	9	14	7	35	41	−6	34
10	Birmingham Legion FC	30	6	12	12	40	46	−6	30
11	Loudoun United FC	30	6	11	13	40	46	−6	31
12	Brooklyn FC	30	5	19	6	34	63	−29	21
13	Sporting Club Jacksonville	30	3	22	5	32	78	−46	14

Updated to match(es) played on October 24, 2026. Source: USL Championship Standings

==== Match Results ====
On December 16, 2025, the USL Championship released the regular season schedule for all 25 teams.

All times are in Eastern Time.

March 7, 2026 1	Sporting JAX	0–3	Hartford Athletic	Jacksonville, FL
7:00 PM		Report	Williams 44'; Careaga 79'; Obalola 90'	Stadium: Hodges Stadium; Attendance: 10,357; Referee: Matthew Corrigan

March 14, 2026 2	Rhode Island FC	1–1	Sporting JAX	Pawtucket, RI
4:00 PM	Dorsey 79'	Report	Pedder 84'; Rossiter (yellow card) 73' (yellow-red card) 88'	Stadium: Centreville Bank Stadium; Attendance: 6,758; Referee: Thomas Snyder

March 25, 2026 3	Sporting JAX	2–4	Miami FC	Jacksonville, FL
7:30 PM	Sadlier 2', 23' (pen.)	Report	Tunbridge 12'; Milesi 53'; Rocha 58' (pen.); Ndongo 84'	Stadium: Hodges Stadium; Attendance: 1,311; Referee: Deny Kulasinac

March 28, 2026 4	Pittsburgh Riverhounds SC	3–2	Sporting JAX	Pittsburgh, PA
7:00 PM	Dikwa 7', 50' (pen.); Bassett 27'	Report	Traore 58'; Jääskeläinen 62'	Stadium: Highmark Stadium; Attendance: 4,118; Referee: Atahan Yaya

April 4, 2026 5	Sporting JAX	0–1	Tampa Bay Rowdies	Jacksonville, FL
7:30 PM		Report	Conway 90+5'	Stadium: Hodges Stadium; Attendance: 1,982; Referee: Servando Berna Rico

April 11, 2026 6	Detroit City FC	1–0	Sporting JAX	Hamtramck, MI
4:00 PM	Smith 6'; Rutz (yellow card) 90'	Report	Jääskeläinen (yellow card) 29'; Edwards (yellow card) 42'; Neville (yellow card) 65'	Stadium: Keyworth Stadium; Attendance: 5,379; Referee: Elvis Osmanovic

April 18, 2026 7	Louisville City FC	1–0	Sporting Club Jacksonville	Louisville, Kentucky
5:00 PM	Wilson 90+6'	Report		Stadium: Lynn Family Stadium; Attendance: 11,182; Referee: Muhammad Kaleia

May 2, 2026 8	Charleston Battery	4–0	Sporting JAX	Mt. Pleasant, SC
7:00 PM	Swan 28', 64'; Foster 32'; Pakhomov 42'	Report	Rose (red card) 18'	Stadium: Patriots Point Soccer Complex; Attendance: 3,513; Referee: John Matto

May 9, 2026 9	Indy Eleven	2–1	Sporting JAX	Indianapolis, IN
7:00 PM	Rendón 51'; Herbert 65'	Report	Al-Qaq 45'	Stadium: Carroll Stadium; Attendance: 8,419; Referee: Igor Bych

May 27, 2026 10	Sporting JAX	4–4	San Antonio FC	Jacksonville, FL
7:30 PM	Emil Jääskeläinen 6'; Kieran Sadlier 23' (pen.); Kieran Sadlier 45' (pen.); Rafferty Pedder 89'	Report	Dmitriy Erofeev 48'; Christian Sorto 51'; Akeem Ward 54'; Christian Sorto 76'	Stadium: Hodges Stadium; Attendance: 808; Referee: Edson Carvajal

May 30, 2026 11	Sporting JAX	2–2	Brooklyn FC	Jacksonville, Florida
7:00 PM	Rose 37'; Pedder 55'	Report	Mangione 8'; Stojanovic 23'	Stadium: Hodges Stadium; Attendance: 820; Referee: Benjamin Meyer
Note: Match abandoned in the 74th minute due to inclement weather.

June 6, 2026 12	Monterey Bay FC	2–1	Sporting JAX	Seaside, CA
10:00 PM	Garcia Jr. 19'; Bidois 80'	Report	Sadlier 70'	Stadium: Cardinale Stadium; Attendance: 2,421; Referee: Matthew Thompson

June 13, 2026 13	Sporting JAX	2–6	Detroit City FC	Jacksonville, FL
7:00 PM	Jääskeläinen 9'; Rito (yellow card) 45'; Kuzain (yellow card) 65'; Sadlier 69'; Gomez (yellow card) 90+1'	Report	Smith 13' 26' 45+3' 57' 81'; Diouf (yellow card) 48'; Amoo-Mensah (yellow card) 56'; Rutz (yellow card) 84'; Hernandez-Foster 90+2'	Stadium: Hodges Stadium; Attendance: 450; Referee: Jorge Escobar

June 20, 2026 14	Sporting JAX	2–5	Charleston Battery	Jacksonville, FL
7:00 PM	Kuzain 44', 47'; Edwards (yellow card) 59' (yellow-red card) 81'	Report	Foster 12'; Kelly 14'; Berry 19', 53'; Hughes 82'	Stadium: Hodges Stadium; Attendance: 446; Referee: Muhammad Hassan

July 3, 2026 15	Loudoun United FC	2–2	Sporting JAX	Leesburg, VA
7:00 PM	Ordóñez 81'; Aboukoura 90+1'	Report	Sadlier 45+1'; Jääskeläinen 90+3'	Stadium: Segra Field; Attendance: 3,080; Referee: Mario Maric

July 15, 2026 16	Sporting JAX	2–1	Pittsburgh Riverhounds SC	Jacksonville, FL
7:30 PM	Sadlier 50'; Souza 78' (o.g.)	Report	Amann 29'	Stadium: Hodges Stadium; Attendance: 1,067; Referee: John Matto

July 18, 2026 17	Sporting JAX	2–2	Brooklyn FC	Jacksonville, FL
7:00 PM	Jääskeläinen 3'; Al-Qaq 9'	Report	Obregón 57'; McNamara 75' (pen.)	Stadium: Hodges Stadium; Attendance: 1,193; Referee: Nabil Bensalah

July 25, 2026 18	El Paso Locomotive FC	2–0	Sporting JAX	El Paso, TX
9:00 PM	Moreno 15'; Rubín 83'	Report		Stadium: Southwest University Park; Attendance: 4,709; Referee: Cristian Campo Hernández

August 1, 2026 19	Sacramento Republic FC	5–0	Sporting JAX	Sacramento, CA
11:00 PM	Wolff 7', 40', 69'; Timmer 38'; Desmond 43'	Report		Stadium: Heart Health Park; Attendance: 10,026; Referee: Steven Cardozo

August 15, 2026 20	Sporting JAX	0–1	Indy Eleven	Jacksonville, FL
7:00 PM		Report	Gomez 90+2' (o.g.)	Stadium: Hodges Stadium; Attendance: 1,366; Referee: Joe Surgan

August 22, 2026 21	Birmingham Legion FC	2–3	Sporting JAX	Birmingham, AL
8:00 PM	Damus 55'; Williams 90+3'	Report	Jääskeläinen 58'; Kuzain 76'; Wilson 90+11'	Stadium: Protective Stadium; Attendance: 3,013; Referee: Deny Kulasinac

August 29, 2026 22	Brooklyn FC	4–1	Sporting JAX	Brooklyn, NY
7:00 PM	Mangione 8', 27'; Anderson 35'; Olney 78'	Report	Sadlier 71'	Stadium: Maimonides Park; Referee: Rodrigo Albuquerque

September 5, 2026 23	Sporting JAX	3–2	Lexington SC	Jacksonville, FL
7:00 PM	Sadlier 19'; Jääskeläinen 88'; Al-Qaq 90+4'	Report	Epps 73'; Zengue 84'	Stadium: Hodges Stadium; Attendance: 1,175; Referee: Carlos Rodriguez

September 12, 2026 24	Sporting JAX	0–3	Rhode Island FC	Jacksonville, FL
7:00 PM		Report	Tsukada 38'; Korzeniowski 63'; Kwizera 90' (pen.)	Stadium: Hodges Stadium; Referee: Jorge Escobar

September 16, 2026 25	Hartford Athletic	2–0	Sporting JAX	Hartford, CT
7:00 PM	Scarlett 21'; Samadia 83'	Report		Stadium: Trinity Health Stadium; Attendance: 2,958; Referee: Igor Bych

September 26, 2026 26	Sporting JAX	1–4	Loudoun United FC	Jacksonville, FL
7:00 PM	Kuzain 30'	Report	Davis 4', 73'; Torres 56', 58'	Stadium: Hodges Stadium; Attendance: 1,198; Referee: Cristian Campo Hernández

September 30, 2026 27	Miami FC	4–1	Sporting JAX	Miami, FL
7:00 PM	Rocha 38'; Milanés 42', 85'; Tunbridge 80'	Report	Edwards (red card) 29'; Mota 43'	Stadium: Pitbull Stadium; Referee: Amin Hadzic

October 3, 2026 28	Sporting JAX	Postponed	Louisville City FC	Jacksonville, FL
5:00 PM		Report		Stadium: Hodges Stadium
Note: Match rescheduled due to Louisville City FC making it to the USL Cup Final.

October 10, 2026 29	Sporting JAX	0–1	Birmingham Legion FC	Jacksonville, FL
5:00 PM		Report	Paterson 37'	Stadium: Hodges Stadium; Referee: Elvis Osmanovic

October 21, 2026 28	Sporting Club Jacksonville	–	Louisville City FC	Jacksonville, Florida
5:00 PM				Stadium: Hodges Stadium
Note: Rescheduled match from October 3

October 24, 2026 30	Tampa Bay Rowdies	v	Sporting JAX	St. Petersburg, FL
7:30 PM				Stadium: Al Lang Stadium

=== USL Cup ===
Sporting JAX participated in the third edition of the USL Cup, and the second edition to feature teams from both the USL Championship and League One.

==== Standings ====
Pos	Lg	Team	Pld	W	PKW	PKL	L	GF	GA	GD	Pts	Qualification
1	USLC	Tampa Bay Rowdies	4	4	0	0	0	10	1	+9	12	Advance to knockout stage
2	USLC	Miami FC	4	3	0	0	1	11	5	+6	9	Advance to knockout stage (wild card)
3	USLC	Sporting Club Jacksonville	4	1	0	1	2	3	4	−1	4	
4	USL1	Sarasota Paradise	4	1	0	0	3	2	9	−7	3	
5	USL1	FC Naples	4	0	1	0	3	2	9	−7	2	

==== Group stage ====
April 25, 2026	Sporting JAX	0–1	Miami FC	Jacksonville, Florida
7:30 p.m.		Report	Rocha 9'	Stadium: Hodges Stadium; Attendance: 1,642; Referee: Brad Jensen

May 13, 2026	Sarasota Paradise	0–2	Sporting JAX	Lakewood Ranch, Florida
7:30 p.m.		Report	Pedder 34'; Al Qaq 87'	Stadium: Premier Sports Campus; Attendance: 683; Referee: Erick Lezama

May 17, 2026	FC Naples	1–1 (3–1 p)	Sporting JAX	Naples, Florida
5:00 p.m.	Cisneros 90+3'	Report	Al Qaq 17'	Stadium: Paradise Coast Sports Complex; Attendance: 2,071; Referee: Mario Maric
	Penalties
	Ferrín (penalty scored); Mesias (penalty scored); O'Connor (penalty scored); Osorio (penalty missed)		(penalty missed) Jääskeläinen; (penalty missed) Edwards; (penalty scored) Neville; (penalty missed) Sadlier

June 6, 2026	Sporting JAX	0–2	Tampa Bay Rowdies	Jacksonville, Florida
7:00 p.m.		Report	Cruz 35'; Myers 45+2'	Stadium: Hodges Stadium; Attendance: 869; Referee: Amin Hadzi
