= Daniel Wilson =

Daniel, Danny or Dan Wilson may refer to:

== Sports ==
- Dan Wilson (outfielder) (1915–1986), American Negro leagues baseball player
- Dan Wilson (catcher) (born 1969), American baseball catcher and manager
- Danny Wilson (rugby) (born 1955), Welsh rugby union, and rugby league footballer, and father of Ryan Giggs
- Danny Wilson (rugby union) (born 1976), rugby union coach
- Danny Wilson (footballer, born 1960), English-born Northern Irish footballer and manager
- Danny Wilson (cricketer) (born 1977), former English cricketer
- Danny Wilson (footballer, born 1991), Scottish footballer
- Daniel Wilson (footballer, born 1993), Guyanese footballer

== Politicians ==
- Daniel Wilson (MP) (1680–1754), member of parliament for Westmorland constituency
- Daniel Martin Wilson (1862–1932), Irish politician and judge

== Musicians ==
- Dan Wilson (musician) (born 1961), American guitarist and vocalist, frontman for the band Semisonic
- Dan Wilson, British musician, instrument builder and composer better known as Meadow House
- Dan Wilson, English musician, lead singer of London band Televised Crimewave and formerly of Black Wire
- Danny Wilson, country rock musician in Grand Drive and Danny and the Champions of the World
- Danny Wilson (band), a Scottish band
- Daniel Wilson (musician) (born 1990), American singer, songwriter and producer

== Others ==
- Dan Wilson (biologist), American biologist and science communicator
- Daniel Wilson (chemist), Scottish chemist who became a wealthy French industrialist
- Dan Wilson (playwright) (born 1970), American playwright, director and actor
- Daniel Wilson (academic) (1816–1892), British-Canadian archaeologist, ethnologist and author
- Daniel Wilson (bishop) (1778–1858), Bishop of Calcutta
- Daniel H. Wilson (born 1978), American writer and robotics engineer
- Daniel Wilson, American film producer best known for his production of The Handmaid's Tale
- Daniel Wilson, better known as Dycaite, founder of the Lost Media Wiki
- The brother of television character James Wilson (House)

== See also ==
- Dany Wilson (1982–2011), Jamaican beach volleyball and volleyball player
- Meet Danny Wilson (disambiguation)
