= Cloudia Swann =

English actress

Cloudia Swann is an English stage, film and television actress.

== Life and career ==
Swann was born in Leicestershire, and spent her early years living in Stratford-upon-Avon where she attended Bromsgrove School until the age of 13. Swann later attended Cheltenham College for her A-Levels before a 3-year Acting Diploma at the Oxford School of Drama, graduating in 2005 when she landed her first screen leading role opposite Jesper Christanson as Alice in an Independent Feature Shaking Dreamland. In 2006, she landed a 3 part series, Dream Team 80s for Sky TV before playing a semi-regular role for BBC Scotland's River City. In 2007, Swann landed leading role Sophie in Shine Productions Dis/connected directed by Tom Harper, as part of the BBC 3 pilot season. Swann played Mark Addy's daughter for ITV's Bike Squad.

Swann had a small role in an episode of Demons which screened in February 2009, and also appeared in independent film, Shoot on Sight directed by Jag Mundhra starring Brian Cox and Greta Scacchi about the 7/11 bombings in London. In 2010, she was cast in the award-winning The Great Game: Afghanistan at the Tricycle Theatre, a British series of short plays on the history of Afghanistan and foreign intervention there, from the First Anglo-Afghan War to the present day, directed by Nicolas Kent and Indhu Rubasingham. Swann played six different characters from a young Afghan girl in Black Tulips to Simon Stephens' Canopy of Stars as a wife confronting her sergeant husband about returning to war. The success of the US tour resulted in a return to Washington D.C. in early 2011 for two exclusive performances at the Pentagon.

Prior to this, Swann guested in many TV shows. She appeared in the Multi Million Rowntrees Randoms Campaign playing a random primary school teacher which was aired across the UK. Other company commercials in which Swann has appeared include telecommunications company Orange, Vageta and the Co-op. She starred in a stage production of Of Mice and Men at the Dukes Theatre in Lancaster. In September 2011, she completed filming Real Playing Game, a thriller.

== Selected filmography ==
=== Films ===
Year	Film	Character	Director/Producer	Studio
2005	Shaking Dreamland	Alice	Martina Nagel	Eagle Films
2006	Young Hearts Leap	Face Girl	Alex Kalymnios	BFI
2006	All Bar Love	Eva	James Derbyshire	Te papa
2007	Shoot on Sight	Justine Miller	Jag Mundhra	Cine Boutique
2011	RPG	Young Player No. 3	Tino Navarro	MGN Filmes
2012	Next Exit	Jenny	Ben Goodger	Short Film
2012	7300 Days Later	Eddie	Luca Bertoluzzi	Passion Raw
2014	Ramanujan	Ms. Bourne	Gnana Rajasekaran	Camphor Cinema

== Television ==
Year	Production	Character	Director/Producer	Studio
2013	RPG	Young Player No. 8	David Rebordão and Tino Navarro	
2012	Hollyoaks	Helen	Mickey Jones	Lime Pictures
2009	Fried Brain Sandwich	Carmel	Guy Jenkin	Sony Pictures
2009	Hollyoaks	Sandy	Tant Lay	Lime Pictures
2009	Doctors	Sally	Daniel Wilson	BBC
2009	Demons	Greta	Tom Harper	Shine Productions
2008	Dis-connected	Sophie (lead)	Tom Harper	Shine Productions
2007	Bike Squad	Susan	Guy Jenkin	Hatrick Productions
2007	River City	Sophie	Various Directors	BBC Scotland
2006	The Bill	Sally Ayling	Robert Del Maestro	Thames TV
2006	Dream Team Retro	Susan	Rob McGillivery	Hewland

== Theatre ==
Year	Production	Character	Director
2010/11	Black Tulips (The Great Game)	Nahid	Nicolas Kent
2010/11	Wood for the Fire	Karen	Rachel Grunwald
2010/11	Night Is Darkest Before the Dawn	Minoo	Indhu Rubasingham
2010/11	On the Side of Angels	Fiona	Indhu Rubasingham
2010/11	Fiona Gall	Fiona	Nicolas Kent
2010/11	Canopy of Stars	Cheryl	Nicolas Kent
2009	Of Mice and Men	Curleys Wife	Kevin Dyer
2006	Othello	Desdemona	Kathryn Hunter, Marcello Magni
2004	Edmund	Glenna	Che Walker

== Other work ==
Year	Production	Character	Medium
2012	Orange Christmas Commercial	Mum	Romania (TV, Internet)
2010	Canopy of Stars	Cheryl	BBC 3 (Radio)
2010	Tantemarie Commercial	Girl	Gordon Ramsay (Viral)
2009	Loose Women	N/a	BBC Lancaster (Radio)
2009	Rowntrees Randoms Commercial	School Teacher	UK (TV)
2008	Vageta Commercial	Girl	Baltic States (TV)
2007	Orange Commercial	Sushi Girl	Israel (Cinema and TV)
2006	The Co-op Commercial	Jealous Girl	Switzerland (Cinema and TV)
