= Abhishek Shankar =

Indian Tamil film and television actor (born 1964)

- Born: Lakshmi Shankar; 24 February 1964 (age 62); Chembur, Mumbai, India
- Other name: Abhishek
- Occupation: Actor
- Years active: 1995-present
- Spouse: Padma Shankar

Abhishek Shankar is an Indian actor who has worked on Tamil films and television serials.

== Career ==
Abhishek made his debut as an actor with Gnana Rajasekaran's critically acclaimed drama film Mogamul (1995), playing a leading role alongside Archana Joglekar. Unable to sustain a career in films, he switched over to television in 1999 after Ekta Kapoor offered him a role in her new serial, Kudumbam. He subsequently assisted her in the production of the Tamil television series, as well as portraying a comedy role. He went on to work on nearly forty more serials and rose to prominence, portraying the character Bhaskaran in the serial, Kolangal. The success of the show meant he was selected to feature in other shows in the late 2000s including Malargal, Girija and Kollywood Court on television.

In 2009, he announced his intentions of directing and producing films under his home banner of Hollywood to Bollywood Films. He began work on his directorial debut Kathai featuring newcomers, and the film had a low-profile release in January 2012. The film won mixed reviews, with a critic from Sify.com noting he "should be patted on his back for touching up on such a heavy subject". Abhishek then announced another project titled Kaiyazhuthu with Shaan, who played the lead role in Kathai, during the making of his first film, but the venture was later left incomplete. He launched another directorial venture in May 2012, a police action adventure with Samuthirakani, but the film failed to progress. Regarding his performance in Ka Pae Ranasingam, a critic stated that "A tip of the hat to actor Abhishek, who despite the limited scope of his character (a Government official), was one of only three or four actors in the film who delivers a close-to-believable performance".

== Selected filmography ==
=== As actor ===
Films

Year	Film	Role	Notes
1995	Mogamul	Babu	
2001	Asokavanam		
2003	Pallavan		
2007	Ammuvagiya Naan	Raghu	
2010	Azhagaana Ponnuthan		
2011	Pathinaaru	Gopalakrishnan	
2014	Thalaivan		
2014	Samsaaram Aarogyathinu Haanikaram	Sridevi's husband	Malayalam
2014	Vaayai Moodi Pesavum	Vidhya's husband	
2015	Aambala	Periya Ponnu's husband	
2016	Pencil	Sundarajan	
2017	Thupparivaalan	Madhivannan	
2019	Vantha Rajavathaan Varuven	Prakash's brother	
2020	Ka Pae Ranasingam	Government official	
2021	Kabadadaari	Ravichandran	
2021	Mirugaa	Police commissioner	
2022	Yenni Thuniga	Doctor	
2023	D3		
2023	N4		

Web series

Year	Film	Role	Language	Notes
2021	The Family Man	Lasit Rupatunga	Hindi	
2022	Irai	Shivakumar	Tamil	
2022	Paper Rocket	Shankar IPS	Tamil	
2025	The Hunt - The Rajiv Gandhi Assassination Case	Dr. P Chandra Sekharan	Hindi	

=== As director ===
Year	Film	Notes
2010	Kathai	

== TV Series ==
As actor

Year	Title	Role	Channel
1999–2001	Kudumbam		Sun TV
2000	Pushpanjali	Chandru	Sun TV
2000–2001	Anandha Bhavan	Kishore	Sun TV
2000	Micro Thodargal-Othigai	Doctor	Raj TV
2001–2002	Aalu Magalu		Gemini TV
2001–2003	Alai Osai		Sun TV
2003	Kungumam		Sun TV
2003–2005	Adugiran Kannan		Sun TV
2003–2009	Kolangal	Bhaskar	Sun TV
2004–2007	Kalki	Manoj	Jaya TV
2005–2007	Raja Rajeshwari		Sun TV
2005–2006	Manaivi		Sun TV
2005–2006	Dheerga Sumangali		Sun TV
2005–2006	Selvangal		Sun TV
2006–2008	Chellamadi Nee Enakku		Sun TV
2008–2010	Thiruppavai		Sun TV
	Girija M.A.	Bharath	Jaya TV
2010–2012	Chellamay	Anbukumar (AK)	Sun TV
2010	Mythili		Kalaignar TV
2010–2012	Anupallavi	Rajaraman	Sun TV
2012	Thangam	Rathnan	Sun TV
2012–2013	Vellai Thamarai		Sun TV
2012–2013	Maya	Chandrashekhar	Jaya TV
2019–2020	Chocolate	Sanjay Kumar	Sun TV
2021–2022	Pudhu Pudhu Arthangal	Hari Krishnan	Zee Tamil
2023–2024	Meena	Sathyamoorthy	Sun TV
2025	Maari	Yama (Extended Special Appearance)	Zee Tamil
2025–Present	Paarijatham	Vijayaraghavan	Zee Tamil
2025	Police Police	Muthupandi	JioHotstar
2025–Present	Annamalai Kudumbam	Dandapaani	Zee Tamil
2026–Present	Ethirneechal Thodargiradhu	Captain Oliver Devasagayam	Sun TV
2026–Present	Thulasi	Chidambaram	Sun TV
