= Ainthu Unarvugal =

2021 Indian anthology film

- Poster
- Directed by: Gnana Rajasekaran
- Screenplay by: Gnana Rajasekaran
- Story by: R. Chudamani
- Produced by: Gnana Rajasekaran
- Cinematography: C. J. Rajkumar
- Edited by: B. Lenin
- Music by: Srikanth Deva
- Production company: Aram Productions
- Release date: 26 November 2021
- Running time: 106 minutes
- Country: India
- Language: Tamil

Ainthu Unarvugal (transl. Five emotions) is a 2021 Indian Tamil-language anthology film, consisting of five short film segments directed by Gnana Rajasekaran, based on the stories of R. Chudamani. The film was released on 26 November 2021.

== Plot ==
All five stories take place in Tamil Nadu between 1975 and 1985.

The first, Irandin Idayil, narrates the tale of an adolescent boy's infatuation with his married tuition teacher. She helps develop the boy's interest in history – and impressed by her way of teaching the subject, he begins to have a crush on her. He later develops a grudge against her husband, after finding out that she is married. How the boy's mother eventually handles and defuses the situation forms the crux of the tale.

The second story, Amma Pidivathakari, centres on a widowed mother. The lady and her son live in a small house, with little scope for privacy. After the son gets married, his wife moves into the house to live with the mother and son. As a result of the sounds emerging every night from the newly married couple's room, the mother eventually decides to move into a woman's hostel.

The third story, Pathil Piraku Varum focuses on the issue of dowry. A single woman chooses to remain unmarried to avoid paying dowry to potential husbands. One day, a prospective groom encounters her after a long gap. He reveals himself to be a widower and a father of two sons – and states that he wants to marry her. However, she reveals a secret that makes him reconsider his proposal.

The fourth story Thanimai Thalir narrates the tale of grandparents' love for their granddaughter. The girl's career-focused parents have left her to further their own careers and are living in another part of the country, leaving the grandparents and granddaughter to bond.

The fifth story, Kalangam Illai, centres on the preconceived notions of a working woman from South India staying alone in a rented house.

== Cast ==
- Sujitha
- Sriranjani
- Sathyapriya
- Shanthi Williams
- Shreya Anchan
- Sahana Sheddy
- Nayana Sai

== Production ==
Gnana Rajasekaran based Ainthu Unarvugal on five stories written by writer R. Chudamani, which talk about relationships and the psychological nuances in them. He revealed that through the project, he was keen to move away being known as a film-maker who makes only biopics. The film marked the Tamil-language debut of actress Nayana Sai, who was spotted by the team when attending acting workshops in koothu-P-Pattarai.

== Release and reception ==
Though originally planned for a direct-to-streaming release, Gnana Rajasekaran took the opinions of distributors, theatre owners and agents for satellite channels, after watching the film, which convinced him to release it in theatres. The film was released across Tamil Nadu on 26 November 2021, and coincidentally shared the same release date as Vasanth's Sivaranjiniyum Innum Sila Pengalum (2021), which was also an anthology based on the lives of South Indian women. A critic from Hindu Tamil Thisai gave the film a positive review, as did a reviewer from the newspaper Dina Thanthi.
