= Mogamul =

- Poster
- Directed by: Gnana Rajasekaran
- Based on: Mogamul by Thi. Janakiraman
- Produced by: J. Dharmambal
- Starring: Archana Joglekar; Nedumudi Venu; Abhishek
- Cinematography: Sunny Joseph; Thangar Bachan
- Edited by: B. Lenin; V. T. Vijayan
- Music by: Ilaiyaraaja
- Production company: J. R. Film Circuit
- Release date: 14 May 1995
- Country: India
- Language: Tamil

Mogamul (transl. Infatuation) is a 1995 Indian Tamil-language film directed by Gnana Rajasekaran based on the novel of the same name by Thi. Janakiraman. The film stars Archana Joglekar, Nedumudi Venu and Abhishek, while Vivek and Vennira Aadai Moorthy play supporting roles. The score and soundtrack were composed by Ilaiyaraaja. The film was released on 14 May 1995 and won the Indira Gandhi Award for Best Debut Film of a Director.

== Plot ==
Babu is a college student and an aspiring classical vocalist. He is friends with Yamuna and her mother, who live in the same village. Yamuna is born out of wedlock, and her parents belong to different castes. So the society shuns their family and multiple prospective bridegrooms decline her.

Babu's neighbor is an old man, married to a very young and attractive woman, Thangamma. Thangamma is frustrated with her non-existent sex life, and slowly gets attracted to Babu and they end up making love. Babu feels guilty about this and reveals the incident to Yamuna, and claims he now realizes he wants to marry her. But Yamuna declines saying she is 10 years elder to Babu, and also, he is destined to become a successful singer and cannot get distracted by love and women.

Thangamma is deeply in love with Babu and wants to elope with him. Babu refuses and Thangamma kills herself in disappointment. Babu's music teacher Ranganna also dies and he is at a dead end with Yamuna not willing to marry him as well. So he leaves the village and goes absconding.

Babu's friend Raja locates him in Chennai after 3 years, and learns Babu is still thinking of Yamuna and unable to progress in his musical journey. Raja meets Yamuna, whose father had died and she and her mother are living in poverty, and tells her about Babu. Yamuna meets Babu and offers herself to him and they make love. She then encourages Babu to focus on his music now that she belongs to him.

== Cast ==
- Archana Joglekar as Yamuna
- Nedumudi Venu as Ranganna
- Abhishek as Babu
- Vennira Aadai Moorthy
- Vivek as Raja
- Shanmugasundaram
- Delhi Ganesh
- Krishnankutty Nair
- Sangeetha
- Vaani
- Kamala Kamesh as Ranganna's wife

== Production ==
Mogamul marked the directorial debut of Gnana Rajasekaran, and is based on the novel of the same name written by Thi. Janakiraman. It took roughly a year to complete the film.

== Soundtrack ==
The music was Ilaiyaraaja, with lyrics by Vaali. The song "Kamalam Paatha" is set in the Carnatic raga Ramapriya.

Track listing
No.	Title	Singer(s)	Length
1.	"Kamalam Paatha"	K. J. Yesudas	4:55
2.	"Sollaayo Vaaithiranthu" (male)	M. G. Sreekumar	4:28
3.	"Sollaayo Vaaithiranthu" (female)	S. Janaki	4:29
4.	"Nenje Gurunaatharin"	M. G. Sreekumar	4:10
5.	"Nenje Gurunaatharin Sevadi"	Arunmozhi	4:11
6.	"Sangeetha Gnanamu" (lyrics by Tyagaraja)	K. J. Yesudas	3:38
7.	"Mogamul Title Score" (Instrumental)	—	2:31
Total length:			28:22

== Release and reception ==
Mogamul was released on 14 May 1995. S. R. of Kalki appreciated the film's plot and direction and the performances of cast and crew. It won the Indira Gandhi Award for Best Debut Film of a Director.
