= Sindhu Rajasekaran =

Author, academic and filmmaker

Sindhu Rajasekaran is an acclaimed writer, academic and independent filmmaker. She is the author of Forgotten Feminisms - A Subversive Retelling of Indian Womxn's Resistance and other books across genres. Her debut novel Kaleidoscopic Reflections was longlisted for the Crossword Book Award, while her non-fiction book Smashing the Patriarchy – A Guide for the 21st Century Indian Woman was published by Aleph Book Company. Forbidden Desire – How the British Stole India’s Queer Pasts & Queer Futures, her well-known book on queer South Asian pasts, was published by Simon & Schuster. She has created a popular art/culture platform The Subjective Space of which she's the Curatrix.

Sindhu's prose and poetry have appeared in literary magazines like Room, New Writing Scotland, and Asia Literary Review. She has also published a collection of short stories titled So I Let It Be.

Her independent film production company, Camphor Cinema has produced an Indo-British feature film Ramanujan, based on the life and times of the mathematical genius Srinivasa Ramanujan.

== Early life and academic work ==
Sindhu was born in Madras to IAS officer and Film Director Gnana Rajasekaran and Sakunthala Rajasekaran. She grew up in Kerala and Tamil Nadu. Trained as an Electronics and Communications Engineer at Anna University, Sindhu studied for a master's degree in English from the University of Edinburgh.

A recipient of the Dean's Global Research Award at the University of Strathclyde, Sindhu's research revolves around queer South Asian pasts, creative epistemologies & decolonial storytelling. She has presented her research at various international academic conferences including the Association for Asian Studies AAS-in-Asia Conference, Asia in Motion: Memory, Preservation and Documentation, in South Korea, the 50th Annual Conference on South Asia at the University of Wisconsin-Madison, the Royal Society of Edinburgh Research Network, and at the Centre for Gender History, University of Glasgow. Sindhu graduated with a PhD in Creative Writing in 2025.

She currently serves as Writer-in-Residence at the University of Manitoba's Centre for Creative Writing and Oral Culture.

== Literary works ==
Sindhu's debut novel Kaleidoscopic Reflections has two reviews on Amazon and was longlisted for the Crossword Book Award in 2011. The novel tells the tale of an inter-caste Tamil family, spanning five generations, and how their destiny is inextricably linked to the fate of India.

In her second book, So I Let It Be, the themes of love, loss of individuality, sexuality, and sense of saudade are explored. Stories from this collection have previously been featured in literary magazines. The Sacred Cow appeared in the Asia Literary Review. The Routine was published in Elsewhere Lit. Huffington Post listed this story among 14 contemporary short stories that will spark your mind. Her short story Mountain of God was published in Kitaab.

Sindhu's acclaimed third book, Smashing the Patriarchy, was published by Aleph Book Company in 2021. Centred around the bold voices of millennials and Gen Zs, Smashing the Patriarchy explores how young Indian women from diverse backgrounds ingeniously overcome the patriarchy in their everyday lives.

In 2021, Canadian feminist literary magazine, Room, published Sindhu’s creative non-fiction Breasts, Being and Nothingness. Her poem Unreal love/r(s) appeared in the Association for Scottish Literature’s anthology, New Writing Scotland 42: “Don’t. Even. Ask. Too. Hot.” in 2024.

Her poems Meghdooth and Let Me Molest You have been published by Muse India as part of an anthology of poetry, and So I Let It Be and Mermaid were published in The Dance of the Peacock by Hidden Brook Press, Canada in 2013.

She has contributed articles on politics and culture to the Scottish website Bella Caledonia and India's Impact. She was amongst the youngest writers invited to participate and speak at the Hyderabad Literary Festival in 2013.

== Theatre and film ==
Sindhu co-wrote and performed her playThe Tiara Gynaelogues at the Edinburgh Festival Fringe in 2011.

She performed spoken word for performance groups Illicit Ink and Writers' Bloc in the UK.

With Ramanujan Sindhu has worked as an Assistant Scriptwriter of the film and also the Producer of the film. She set up the production house, Camphor Cinema, in 2012.

Ramanujan won an award for Best Production at Norway's NTFF in 2015, the Ananda Vikadan Best Production Award and V4 Entertainers Film Awards. The Rashtrapati Bhavan invited Camphor Cinema to screen the film for the President of India

== Personal life ==
Sindhu is bisexual and has written about her personal experiences in Gaysi, Room and in her book Smashing the Patriarchy. Sindhu is a jury member of the inaugural Rainbow Awards for Literature and Journalism – instituted to honour queer literature and journalism in India.
