= Emil Jääskeläinen =

Finnish footballer (born 2001)

Personal information
- Full name: Emil Jääskeläinen
- Date of birth: 16 March 2001 (age 25)
- Place of birth: Bolton, England
- Height: 1.90 m (6 ft 3 in)
- Position: Forward

Team information
- Current team: Sporting Club Jacksonville
- Number: 16

Youth career
- –2019: Blackpool

College career
Years	Team	Apps	(Gls)
2020–2023	LIU Sharks	70	(43)
2024	Akron Zips	21	(23)

Senior career*
Years	Team	Apps	(Gls)
2019–2020	Blackpool	0	(0)
2019–2020	→ Kendal Town (loan)	20	(7)
2020	Kendal Town	6	(1)
2022	Texas United	13	(7)
2023	FC Motown		
2025	St. Louis City SC 2	18	(7)
2026–	Sporting JAX	30	(8)

International career^{‡}
2018	Finland U18	2	(0)
- * Club domestic league appearances and goals as of 16:52, 8 November 2026 (UTC) ‡ National team caps and goals as of 20:00, 16 January 2026 (UTC)

Emil Jääskeläinen (born 13 October 2001) is a professional footballer who plays as a forward for USL Championship club Sporting Club Jacksonville. He was drafted by St. Louis City SC in the 2025 MLS SuperDraft. Born in England, Jääskeläinen has represented Finland at youth international level.

== Early life ==
Jääskeläinen was born in Bolton, England to Maria and Jussi Jääskeläinen. His father Jussi is a former professional goalkeeper who made 530 appearances in the Premier League and earned over 50 caps for the Finland national team. Emil grew up in England and attended Bolton School before moving to the United States to play collegiate soccer.

== College career ==
=== Long Island Sharks ===
Jääskeläinen began his college soccer career at Long Island University (LIU), where he played from 2020 to 2023. During his time with the LIU Sharks, he became the program's all-time leader in both goals, with 43, and points, with 100, recorded 15 game‑winning goals, and earned multiple honors including Northeast Conference (NEC) Player of the Year and All‑Region selections. He was also named to the All-Eastern College Athletic Conference (ECAC) first team in 2023. While at LIU, Jääskeläinen majored in business management.

=== Akron Zips ===
For his final collegiate season in 2024, he transferred to the University of Akron. As a redshirt senior for the Akron Zips, Jääskeläinen started all 21 matches and led the nation in both goals, scoring 23, and points, totaling 54. His performance earned him unanimous Big East Offensive Player of the Year, First‑Team All‑Big East honors, and a spot as a Missouri Athletic Club (MAC) Hermann Trophy finalist.

== Club career ==
=== St. Louis City SC ===
Jääskeläinen was drafted by St. Louis City SC in the 2025 MLS SuperDraft and spent the season playing for their MLS Next Pro side, St. Louis City 2, making 18 appearances and scoring seven goals.

=== Sporting JAX ===
On 16 January 2026, USL Championship expansion club Sporting JAX announced the addition of Jääskeläinen to their inaugural roster. He joined two other players with previous St. Louis City experience in Dida Armstrong and Christian Olivares.

== International career ==
Jääskeläinen has appeared for Finland's national under-18 football team.

== Personal life ==
Jääskeläinen is the son of Jussi Jääskeläinen, a former professional goalkeeper. His older brother, Will, plays professional football for Woking of England's National League. Emil has a younger brother, Robin, who has also played for LIU.

== Honours ==
=== NCAA ===
==== LIU Sharks ====
- Northeast Conference Player of the Year: 2022, 2023
- First-Team All-NEC: 2020–2023
- United Soccer Coaches (USC) All-Region: 2021–2023
- First-Team All-ECAC: 2023

==== Akron Zips ====
- Unanimous Big East Offensive Player of the Year: 2024
- First-Team All-Big East: 20244
- MAC Hermann Trophy finalist: 20244
- United Soccer Coaches (USC) All-Region: 20244
