= Trotsky Marudu =

Indian contemporary artist (born 1953)

- Born: Maruthappan Marudu; 12 August 1953 (age 73); Madurai, Madras State (now Tamil Nadu), India
- Education: Post-Diploma in Painting at Madras College of Arts and Crafts
- Movement: Illustration, Animation, Computer art, Visual arts
- Spouse: T. Rathinam
- Awards: Kalaimamani Awards (2006)
- Elected: Ex.President of M.G.R. Government Film and Television Training Institute

Maruthappan Marudu (born 12 August 1953), popularly known as Trotsky Marudu, is an Indian contemporary artist known for line drawing, animation, storyboard and computer graphics. Marudu has also worked as Art director and VFX creative director for many films and is a pioneer in using computer for painting. He holds a diploma and a post-diploma in painting from the Madras College of Arts and Crafts and his collection of paintings have been exhibited in many countries like Australia, the UK, the US, France, Finland and many parts of India.

Marudu's paintings is a blend of traditional and modern art, mostly figurative and later creeped into semi abstract figurative works. He also shifted his focus slowly into illustration, animation, digital art, photography and his passion towards comic books merged all arts into a single body. He opined that, "The gap between modern painting, illustrations and photography has been bridged, with the computer serving as an all-encompassing platform. Future artists will work like this as multimedia has become a language by itself,".

Marudu has also published many books, and 'Kaalathin Thiraicheelai', a collective collection of Tamil intellectuals view on Marudu-the person, was also published as a book.

== Life and career ==
=== Early life ===
Marudu born in Madurai was attracted to drawing because of his father MR.Maruthappan, a Trotskyist, who encouraged him by introducing books with illustration. He was also influenced by the hand-drawn portraits of Rabindranath Tagore and Netaji Subash Chandra Bose by M. R. Acharekar, that decorated his house. He began to read and observe finer details of his surroundings by roaming the streets of Madurai and read about Salvador Dalí and Pablo Picasso when he was in seventh standard. Marudu's drawing masters Augustine and Jeyaraj nurtured him to win many prizes in competitions.

=== Career ===
Marudu's stint at Madras College of Arts and Crafts helped him to meet sculptor Dhanapal, who later became his mentor. He said, "The exposure at college pushed me to another level of understanding and helped in constantly exploring new possibilities". He was the textile designer at the Weavers Service Centre in Chennai and Vijayawada along with K. M. Adimoolam and other senior artistes. Marudu and Adimoolam took initiative in introducing contemporary art that broke all the conservative techniques in many popular magazines of that era. He was also attracted to movies because of his mother, Rukmini Maruthappan as her uncle MS.Solaimalai was a story and dialogue writer who influenced him along with actor S. S. Rajendran. Marudu was particularly attracted by Walt Disney, stop motion animation, trick shots and special effects in movies that prompted him to join as special effects as well as computer graphics coordinator for more than 30 films so far in both Tamil and Telugu languages.

== Awards and recognitions ==
- 1978: Won the Government of Tamil Nadu's 'Best Artist' award.
- 2006: Received title of Kalaimamani Award by the Government of Tamil Nadu, which is the highest state honour in the field of Arts.
- 2024: The Government appointed him as the president of M.G.R. Government Film and Television Training Institute.

== Personal life ==
He is married to Rathinam Marudu. He lives and works in Chennai.

== Filmography ==
| Year | Film | Contribution |
|---|---|---|
| 1989 | Sariyana Jodi | Art director, VFX creative director |
| 1992 | Mr.Prasad | Art director |
| 1995 | Asuran | VFX creative director |
| 1997 | Devathai | Art director |
| 1999 | Mugam | Art director |
| 2000 | Rajakali Amman | VFX creative director |
| 2000 | Palayathu Amman | VFX creative director |
| 2001 | Nageswari | VFX creative director |
| 2002 | Naina | VFX creative director |
| 2006 | Sasanam | Art director |
| 2008 | Vaazhthugal | Actor |
| 2009 | Peraanmai | Actor |
| 2010 | Nandalala | VFX creative director |
| 2010 | Uyir... Uravu... Unmai... | Art director; short film |
| 2010 | Magizhchi | Title Animation |
| 2015 | Thiru Veerappan | Animation |
| 2017 | Nagesh Thiraiyarangam | VFX creative director |
