= Mugham (film) =

- Directed by: Gnana Rajasekaran
- Written by: Gnana Rajasekaran
- Produced by: Kalaipuli S. Thanu
- Starring: Nassar; Roja
- Cinematography: P. C. Sreeram
- Edited by: B. Lenin; V. T. Vijayan
- Music by: Ilaiyaraaja
- Production company: Kalaipuli International
- Release date: 1 October 1999
- Country: India
- Language: Tamil

Mugham (transl. Face) is a 1999 Indian Tamil-language film written and directed by Gnana Rajasekaran. The film stars Nassar and Roja, while Manivannan, Vivek and Thalaivasal Vijay play supporting roles. It was released on 1 October 1999 and did poorly at the box office.

== Plot ==
Ranganathan aka Rangan is a deformed man and therefore lives a tough life. He is kicked out of jobs, gets ill-treated constantly, and the girl he loves hates him. Then one day, Rangan goes back home and decides to put on a mask on his face. With the mask, Rangan generates followers, becomes a film star, and his new wife Malini loves him solely for his handsome face. Nearing the end, Rangan takes off the Mask for a moment and expects that people would respect him for who he is on the inside. His wife walks in, sees his ugly face, and throws him out, mistaking him for a robber. Rangan's former followers throw him to the side. Deciding that only beauty can bring him respect, Rangan puts the mask back on and lives the life of an actor.

== Cast ==
- Nassar as Rangan
- Roja as Malini
- Manivannan as Muthannan
- Vivek
- Jon Dough as Jon, an American tourist
- Thalaivasal Vijay
- Dave Cummings
- Vennira Aadai Moorthy
- Dhamu
- Mayilsamy
- Fathima Babu
- Ajay Rathnam
- Raviraj
- Peeli Sivam
- Monica
- Shobana

== Production ==
Nassar's appearance in the film was achieved through computer graphics supervised by Trotsky Marudu.

== Release and reception ==
Mugam was released on 1 October 1999. S. R. Ashok Kumar of The Hindu appreciated the lack of fight sequences, song and dance sequences and an antagonist. He also appreciated Sreeram's cinematography and Lenin-Vijayan's editing, Nassar's performance and concluded, "A different film not only for the masses but also for the classes". Aurangzeb of Kalki praised the cinematography, music and art direction but was critical of the film as it fails to connect.

The film did poorly at the box office and was played on television within a month of release. Post-release, Nassar mentioned that the role had seemed interesting when it was first narrated to him, but as the project progressed he lost interest and just followed the director's instructions.
