= Amma Vandhaal =

1966 novel by Thi. Janakiraman

- Author: Thi. Janakiraman
- Language: Tamil
- Publisher: Kalachuvadu
- Publication date: 1966
- Publication place: India
- Media type: Print
- Pages: 100

Amma Vandhaal is an Indian novel by the noted Indian Tamil writer Thi. Janakiraman ("Thi Jaa"). It is a fictional account of a youngster who returns home from his vedic school. It is one of Thi Jaa's most important works, and one of the few that have been translated into English, published in 1972 as The Sins of Appu's Mother.

== Plot ==
Appu, a vedic scholar, returns from his school after completing his studies. After arriving home, Appu learns of his mother's affair with Sivasu, and that the other family members are already aware of it. His mother reveals that she had sent him to the vedic school to atone for her sins. A heartbroken Appu goes back to his school after hearing of his guru's illness, as someone has to run the school.

== Cast ==
- Appu, a scholar
- Bhavani Ammal, who runs the school
- Indu, niece of Bhavani Ammal
- Alankaram, Appu's mother
- Dhandapani, Appu's father
- Sivasu, a rich landowner

== Reception ==
Triloki Nath Madan called the book "a particularly insightful interpretation of the mother–son relationship, when the son is cast by a strong-willed mother in the role of her savior".
