= Ramanujan (film) =

2014 Indian film by Gnana Rajasekara

- Directed by: Gnana Rajasekaran
- Written by: Gnana Rajasekaran
- Produced by: Srivatsan Nadathur; Sushant Desai; Sharanyan Nadathur; Sindhu Rajasekaran
- Starring: Abhinay Vaddi; Abbas Mirza; Suhasini Maniratnam; Kevin McGowan; Bhama; Michael Lieber
- Cinematography: Sunny Joseph
- Edited by: B. Lenin
- Music by: Ramesh Vinayakam
- Production company: Camphor Cinema
- Release date: 11 July 2014
- Running time: 153 minutes
- Countries: India; United Kingdom
- Languages: Tamil; English

Ramanujan is a 2014 biographical film based on the life of Indian mathematician Srinivasa Ramanujan. The film, written and directed by Gnana Rajasekaran, was shot back to back in the Tamil and English languages. The film was produced by the independent Indian production house Camphor Cinema, ventured by Srivatsan Nadathur, Sushant Desai, Sharanyan Nadathur, Sindhu Rajasekaran. The cast consists of Indian and British film, stage and screen personalities. It marks the Tamil debut of Abhinay Vaddi, the grandson of veteran actors Gemini Ganesan and Savitri, as the protagonist.

Featuring an ensemble cast of Suhasini Maniratnam, Bhama, Kevin McGowan, Abbas Mirza, Nizhalgal Ravi, Michael Lieber, amongst others in supporting roles, the film was set in the early 1900s, tracing the life of Ramanujan, and shot across five different locations, across India and England, which includes Kumbakonam, Namakkal, Chennai, London and Cambridge. The film features, music and background score composed by Ramesh Vinayagam, cinematography handled by Sunny Joseph and editing done by B. Lenin.

Ramanujan received Tamil Nadu State Film Award for Best Film in 2013, although the film had released a year later. The film was released worldwide on 11 July 2014, across India and United Kingdom. It was released simultaneously in Tamil and English languages.

== Plot ==
Set in the early 20th century, the film traces the life of the prodigious math genius Srinivasa Ramanujan from the time he was a young Tamil Brahmin to his years in England, where he attended Cambridge University during World War I. The film follows his relationships with his mother Komalatammal, his wife Janaki, and his collaborator Professor G. H. Hardy. The film also showcases how Indian society viewed a mathematician of such great stature.

== Cast ==
- Abhinay Vaddi as Srinivasa Ramanujan
  - Anmol as Young Srinivasa Ramanujan
- Abbas as Prasanta Chandra Mahalanobis
- Suhasini Maniratnam as Komalatammal, Srinivasa Ramanujan's mother)
- Bhama as Janaki, Srinivasa Ramanujan's wife)
- Kevin McGowan as G. H. Hardy
- Michael Lieber as John Edensor Littlewood
- Richard Walsh as Francis Spring
- Sarath Babu as Diwan Bahadur R. Ramachandra Rao I. C. S.
- Radha Ravi as Prof. Singaravelu Mudaliar
- Madhan Bob as Prof. Krishna Shastri
- Y. G. Mahendran as S. Narayana Iyer
- Manobala as Krishna Rao
- Nizhalgal Ravi as Srinivasa Raghavan (Srinivasa Ramanujan's father)
- Satish Kumar as Anandhu
- Thalaivasal Vijay as Sathiyapriya Rayar
- Manibharathi as Krishnan
- Delhi Ganesh
- Raja Krishnamoorthy as Seshu Iyer
- T. P. Gajendran as T. Namberumal Chetty
- Mohan V. Ram
- Cloudia Swann as Ms. Bourne
- Mike Parish as Doctor Charles
- Harsh Naik as Chatterjee
- Lizzie Bourne as Ms. Gertrude Hardy

== Production ==
=== Casting ===
"We had very few photos of Ramanujan and his family. So, we had to purely depend on whatever information was available on the social setup of Iyengars and other castes of that period. We had to design costumes keeping in mind the three phases of his life and those surrounding him — the Kumbakonam phase, his life in Chennai and then, in London,"

— Shakuntala, on designing the looks for Ramanujan

Gnana Rajasekaran looked for an actor who would physically resemble Ramanujan and signed Abhinay Vaddi, who is the grandson of veteran Tamil actor Gemini Ganesan, for the main role. Michael Lieber was signed to play Edensor Littlewood. Lieber confessed he had no knowledge of Ramanujan, when he signed the film, and went as far as to meet Béla Bollobás, who worked with Littlewood personally, for his research work. He found it difficult to speak the Tamil lines, but appreciated it later on, "I would be lying if I said that the task of learning Tamil was not daunting at first, but once I got the hang of it I was able to appreciate what a beautiful language it is. There were many different ways of learning the Tamil lines; some used audio tapes, prompting, flash cards, or word boards. I learnt the meaning of the words and memorised chunks of dialogue." Similarly, Kevin McGowan, who was signed for the role of G. H. Hardy, was unfamiliar with the story of Ramanujan. The film also stars Bhama, Suhasini Maniratnam, Abbas and Richard Walsh amongst others. Sunny Joseph, best known for his high-profile Malayalam works with directors Adoor Gopalakrishnan and Shaji N. Karun, was signed as cinematographer.

=== Filming ===
The film has been shot in the five main locations of Ramanujan's life, Kumbakonam, Namakkal, Chennai, London and Cambridge. The first two schedules were shot in India while the third was done in England, where they took the permission of Cambridge University to shoot. The task to create a script in multiple languages was described by Sindhu Rajasekaran as "quite a chore. Roxane de Rouen and I are working with Gnana Rajasekaran, the director of ‘Ramanujan,’ to make the characters speak words that make them real. No, you wouldn't find roadside urchins who speak in Queen's English here; people would speak what comes to them naturally: Tamil, English, Indian English, even Tamenglish. What a delight it is to live in this world where languages are not borders, but an element to experiment with..."

== Music ==
"My music tries to delve into the unfathomable mysterious and mystical mind of Ramanujan in its own world, which invariably found bliss in the triumph of originating newer and newer theorems. The music represents the tribulations of Ramanujan's life torn between hope and despair, and the loneliness that came along with the genius".

— Vinayakam, on composing the music for Ramanujan

The film's soundtrack and score were composed by Ramesh Vinayakam. The music consisted of classical and orchestral pieces, recorded by the GermanPops Orchestra, whereas the songs being related to mathematical terms. The soundtrack album of Ramanujan, which features eight tracks, including four songs and four instrumentals, was released at the Suryan FM radio station in Chennai on 13 June 2014 to positive reviews from critics.

== Release ==
The official trailer of the film was released on 16 June 2014. On 9 July 2014, the producers of Ramanujan arranged a special screening at the Rashtrapati Bhavan, receiving an invitation from the president Pranab Mukherjee. The film was simultaneously released in India and United Kingdom in Tamil and English languages on 11 July 2014. After the film's theatrical run, the makers released the VCD and DVD formats of the film in late 2014, which featured the making video, behind-the-scenes featurette, and deleted scenes from the film.

== Reception ==
The film received mixed reviews from critics, who generally praised the acting but criticized the writing. The Deccan Chronicle called Ramanujan "a brilliant piece on canvas with edifying moments and relevance to modern age" and went on to add that it was "not to be missed", giving it 3.5/5 stars. S. Saraswathi of Rediff wrote, "Ramanujan is a brilliant film, a must watch" and gave the film 4/5. Gautaman Bhaskaran of Hindustan Times gave the film 3/5 stars and wrote, "The movie is a poignant look at the way a prodigy struggled and suffered in a penurious family, a mastermind whose mathematical wizardry invited ridicule and revulsion in far lesser mortals. Rajasekaran, who also scripted the film, takes us through a linear narrative to tell us about the intelligence of boy Ramanujan as he completely foxes his school-master with a little insight into the importance of zero, and later about his frustration when he hits a wall in his quest to sink into, and shine, with numbers". Sify wrote, "Making biopics is indeed very challenging and the director has been successful to a very large extent to bring out each and every character. Gnana Rajasekaran has done a well-researched biopic on Ramanujam...it is a film that is definitely worth viewing". IANS gave it 3/5 and wrote, "Gnana Rajasekaran certainly knows the art and succeeds narrating an inspiring tale, but his work doesn’t resonate deep within. This is so because the director merely recreates several important episodes from Ramanujan’s life on the screen while ignoring the need to build a screenplay to keep the viewers hooked". Bharath Vijayakumar of Moviecrow rated 3/5 stars and said, "Ramanujan is a noble effort and a fascinating insight about the life and times of this Maths Wizard who lived all his life in unison with his true love.".

In contrast, The New Indian Express wrote, "The director’s persistent effort to bring on celluloid lives of eminent people is laudable. But a movie is not only about the theme, but also about how it is presented on screen. And the presentation of the life and journey of the mathematical genius is disappointing and uninspiring". Baradwaj Rangan of The Hindu wrote, "The film runs nearly three hours and it’s puzzling why it needed to. There appears to have been no effort to streamline the events of Ramanujan’s life. The writing, too, fails to make Ramanujan interesting", going on to add "The great man certainly deserved a better movie". M. Suganth of The Times Of India gave 2.5/5 and wrote, "For a film that is about a man with astounding talent, the filmmaking is largely unimaginative. The staging is somewhat old-fashioned (read dated), the pacing staid and the film often slips into the kind of melodrama that you nowadays find in TV serials.".

== Awards ==
Ramanujan won the Tamil Nadu State Film Award for Best Film of 2013.

== See also ==
- The Man Who Knew Infinity (film)
- List of films about mathematicians
