= Meet Danny Wilson =

Meet Danny Wilson may refer to:

- Meet Danny Wilson (film), a 1952 film
- Meet Danny Wilson (album), a 1987 album

== See also ==
- Danny Wilson (disambiguation)
