= Real Playing Game =

- Directed by: Tino Navarro; David Rebordão
- Written by: Tino Navarro; Artur Ribeiro
- Produced by: Tino Navarro
- Cinematography: José António Loureiro; André Szankowski
- Edited by: Pedro Ribeiro
- Release date: August 29, 2013
- Running time: 103 minutes
- Country: Portugal
- Language: English

Real Playing Game (also known as RPG) is a 2013 Portuguese science fiction film directed by Tino Navarro and David Rebordão, produced and co-written by Navarro. The film stars Rutger Hauer, Soraia Chaves, and Pedro Granger.

== Plot ==
The wealthy Steve Battier (Rutger Hauer) is desperate to find a way to stay alive, as he is both elderly and terminally ill. When a company known as RPG offers him the chance to become young again in return for a large amount of money, he jumps at the chance to participate. Ten millionaires from throughout the world will be placed inside younger bodies for ten hours, but with the catch that every hour someone will die. Exhilarated from the rush of possessing a younger body, Steve is prepared to do whatever it takes to keep that body- despite the fact that experience and reality is not always the same thing.

== Cast ==
- Rutger Hauer as Steve Battier
  - Cian Barry as Young Steve Battier
- Alix Wilton Regan as Young Player #1
- Dafne Fernández as Young Player #5
- Soraia Chaves as Sarah
- Cloudia Swann as Young Player #8
- Nik Xhelilaj as Young Player #2
- Victória Guerra as RPG Chauffeur
- Pedro Granger as Young Player #3
- Chris Tashima as GameKeeper
- Débora Monteiro as Young Player #9
- Christopher Goh as Young Player #4
- Tino Navarro as Financial Speculator
- Genevieve Capovilla as Young Player #6
- Reuben-Henry Biggs as Young Player #7
