= Danny Wilson (footballer, born 1991) =

Scottish footballer (born 1991)

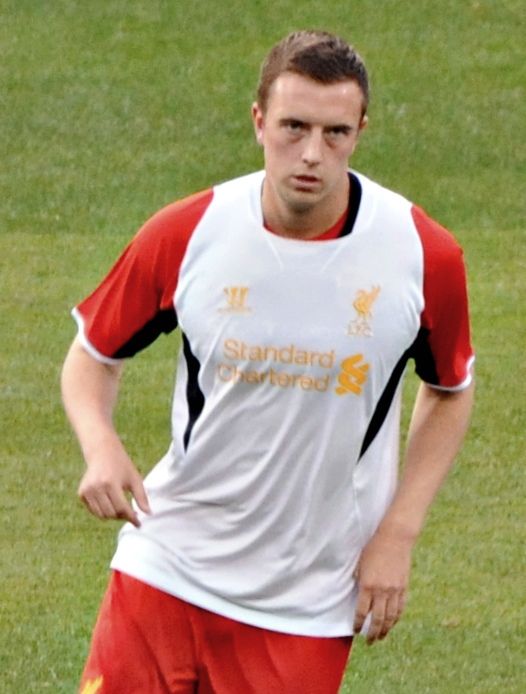
- Wilson with Liverpool in 2012

Personal information
- Full name: Daniel John Wilson
- Date of birth: 27 December 1991 (age 34)
- Place of birth: Livingston, Scotland
- Height: 1.87 m (6 ft 2 in)
- Position: Centre back

Team information
- Current team: Sporting JAX
- Number: 27

Youth career
- 2006–2009: Rangers

Senior career*
Years	Team	Apps	(Gls)
2009–2010	Rangers	14	(1)
2010–2013	Liverpool	2	(0)
2012	→ Blackpool (loan)	6	(0)
2012–2013	→ Bristol City (loan)	1	(0)
2013	→ Heart of Midlothian (loan)	13	(0)
2013–2015	Heart of Midlothian	63	(9)
2015–2018	Rangers	65	(4)
2018–2023	Colorado Rapids	138	(5)
2022	→ Colorado Rapids 2	1	(0)
2024	Queen's Park	10	(0)
2024–2026	Livingston	53	(5)
2026–	Sporting JAX	9	(1)

International career^{‡}
2007	Scotland U17	4	(1)
2008–2009	Scotland U19	8	(0)
2010–2012	Scotland U21	13	(0)
2010–2011	Scotland	5	(1)
- * Club domestic league appearances and goals as of 7 November 2026 ‡ National team caps and goals as of 10 September 2012

Daniel John Wilson (born 27 December 1991) is a Scottish footballer who plays for USL Championship club Sporting Club Jacksonville.

Wilson began his career with Rangers before leaving for English side Liverpool in 2010. After failing to secure a first-team place he joined Blackpool, Bristol City and Heart of Midlothian on loan respectively, joining the latter on a permanent transfer in 2012. Wilson returned to Rangers in 2015 on a free transfer, then moved in January 2018 to American club Colorado Rapids. He returned to Scotland in 2024, with spells at Queen's Park and Livingston.

He has also represented the Scotland national team at U-17, U-19, U-21 and at full international level.

== Club career ==
=== Rangers ===
Wilson came through the youth team ranks at Rangers and captained the under-19 team. He was tipped early on to have a big future at Ibrox (being compared to Alan Hansen), even drawing interest from other clubs before he had made his professional debut. Wilson had been an unused substitute on several occasions during the latter part of the 2008–09 season, including the 2009 Scottish Cup Final against Falkirk.

He made his professional debut for Rangers against Dundee in the League Cup, playing the full 90 minutes of a 3–1 win in October 2009. Just over a week later, he became the youngest Rangers player to play in the UEFA Champions League by starting a 1–1 draw against Unirea Urziceni, aged just 17 years, 312 days. After the match, Wilson described making his debut as "unbelievable". While veteran captain David Weir commented on Wilson, reminding himself as a seventeen years old version of himself. Having made three appearances so far, Wilson says he doesn't expect to have more starts, once Majid Bougherra made his return. Weir then revealed that both Weir and Saša Papac helped him to handle his step up to the first team. Wilson scored his first goal for Rangers in a 4–1 away victory against Hearts at Tynecastle on 27 March 2010. In mid-March, Wilson is close of signing a new contract, according to Manager Walter Smith.

After a promising debut season, Wilson was awarded both the Scottish FWA Young Player of the Year award and the Scottish PFA Young Player of the Year award. He was also voted as Rangers Young Player of the Year by the club's supporters. Upon receiving the awards, Wilson says winning the double in his first season with Rangers is something special. In all for Rangers, he played 26 times and scored once. He was sent off in the 2010 League Cup Final against St Mirren. After the match, Wilson says his sending off was his first and was gutted, in addition, he felt receiving a red card let the team down.

While in process of signing a contract, Wilson was linked with Premier League sides Aston Villa and Liverpool.

=== Liverpool ===
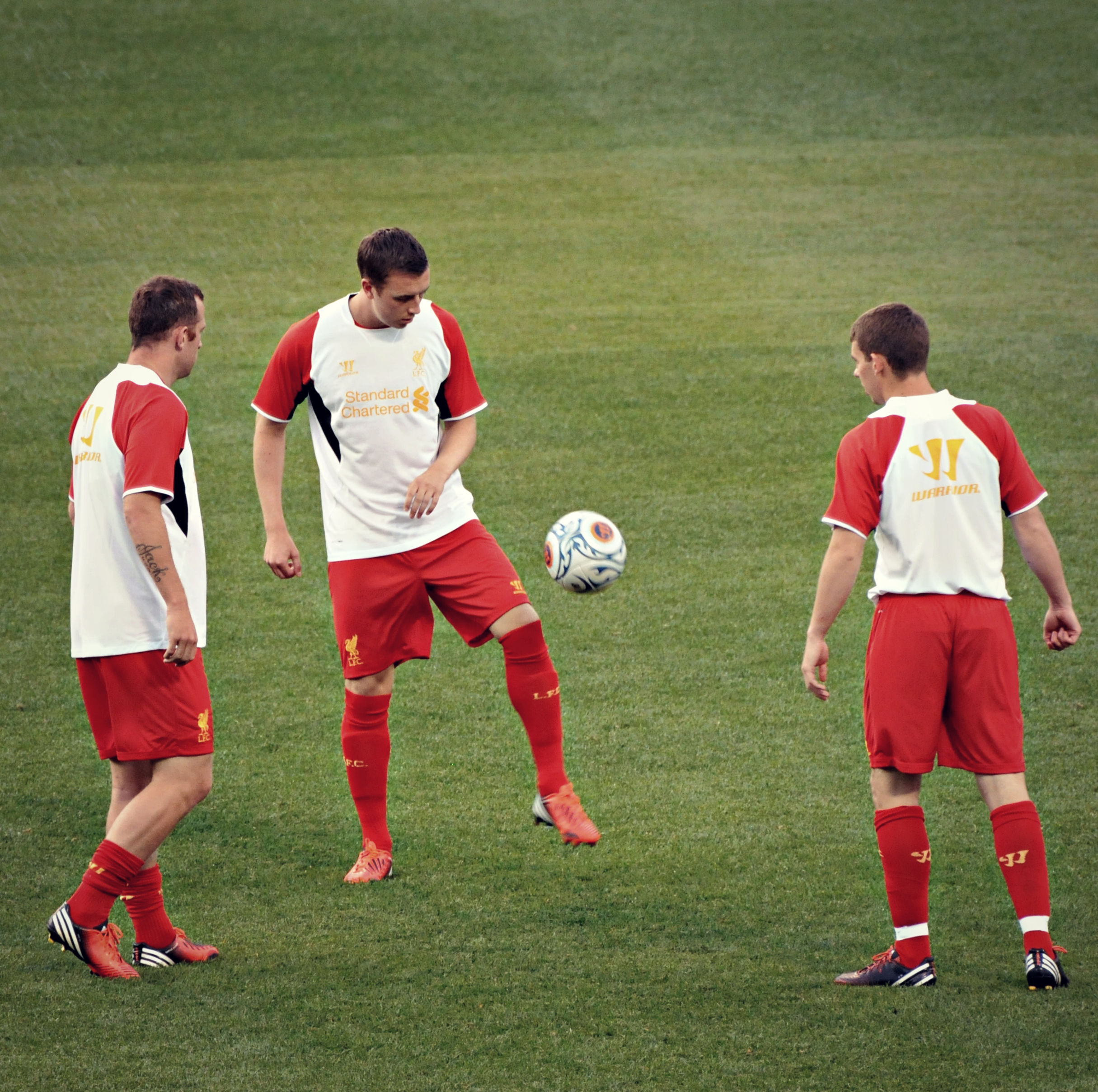
Wilson warming up, along with compatriot Charlie Adam and Jon Flanagan.

On 21 July 2010, Wilson joined Liverpool and signed a three-year deal for an initial transfer fee of £2 million, potentially rising to £5 million based on appearances. Two months later, on 22 September 2010, Wilson made his Liverpool debut. He appeared regularly for the reserves in the early part of the season, scoring his first goal for the second-string on 20 October 2010, in a 3–3 draw with Blackburn Rovers at Prenton Park.

He made his debut for the first team on 22 September 2010 in their defeat to League Two side Northampton Town in the third round of the League Cup; Northampton winning 4–2 on penalties after a 2–2 draw. In the January transfer window, Wilson was linked with a loan move to Rangers's Old Firm rival Celtic. Wilson played for Liverpool in a Europa League tie with Sparta Prague in which he played the full 90 minutes and was praised for his effort by manager Kenny Dalglish. He made his first Premier League start on 27 February 2011 at the Boleyn Ground in a 3–1 defeat against West Ham United. On 17 March, he again started a Europa League tie against Braga. On 2 April, he replaced the injured Daniel Agger during the first half in a 2–1 defeat away to West Bromwich Albion.

In the 2011–12 season, Wilson wanted to leave Liverpool to go out on loan, in order to gain first team football experience. Rangers were among the teams interested in signing Wilson. Wilson made his first appearance against his ex side Rangers in a 1–0 friendly defeat on 18 October 2011.

Upon joining Hearts, Wilson says he didn't have any regrets about joining Liverpool and insisted it made him a better player.

==== Loan spells ====
On 31 December 2011 it was confirmed that Wilson would join Blackpool on loan until the end of the season once the transfer window was declared opened the following day. He made his debut in Blackpool 2–1 win against Crystal Palace.

On 22 November 2012, he was loaned to Championship side Bristol City. He was given the number 40 shirt. Upon joining the club Wilson expressed surprise at the side's then league position which saw it languishing in the relegation zone. He made his first and only appearance for City as a 90th-minute substitute two days later in a 3–1 win away at Middlesbrough.

=== Heart of Midlothian ===
On 18 January 2013, he joined Scottish Premier League side Heart of Midlothian on loan from Liverpool until the end of the season. He was given the squad number four and made his debut the following day from the start at Celtic Park, in a Scottish Premier League match against Celtic, in a 4–1 defeat.

He then played in the Scottish League Cup for the first time in three years when Hearts faced Inverness Caledonian Thistle, which Hearts won on a penalty-shootout after a 1–1 draw after extra-time. The win put Hearts into the final. However, there was controversy over his appearance when he last played in the Scottish League Cup, resulted in him receiving a red card three years ago. The Scottish FA stated that Wilson was indeed eligible, stating he served his ban at the beginning of season 2010/11 and the SFA does not operate competition-specific disciplinary procedures. In the final against St Mirren, Wilson started in the match, partnering a central defender with captain Andy Webster. The match ended with St Mirren winning 3–2 against, having gained revenge on him for three years ago. Since moving to Hearts, Wilson became a regular in the first team and was willing to stay at Hearts for the long term.

On 27 May 2013, it was announced that Wilson would sign a permanent deal with Hearts after his Liverpool contract was up in the summer. The move was initially blocked by the SPL following the club entering administration and being unable to register new players, but this was later rescinded and Wilson was confirmed as a Hearts player on 30 June. On 2 July, Hearts made Wilson club captain at the age of just 21, which manager Gary Locke quote "a big responsibility for him". It is thought this is the reason for Wilson re-signing with the club.

Wilson's first game at Hearts as captain came in the opening game of the season, in a 1–0 defeat to St Johnstone. After winning 3–1 against Aberdeen on 24 August 2014, Wilson was involved in a tunnel incident that saw him receive a one match ban. Then in November, Wilson played a role in giving Hearts points in two games when he assisted one goal in a 3–1 win over Aberdeen and another, in a 2–2 draw against Ross County. Soon, Wilson was on the sideline when he had tonsillitis and scored on his return in a 3–3 draw against St Johnstone. Wilson scored his second goal of the season a month later on 21 March 2014, in a 2–1 loss against Dundee United. His third goal came in a 4–2 defeat to Partick Thistle on 7 May 2014. However, Wilson was unable to help the club survive relegation from the Scottish Premiership. Despite this, Wilson made thirty-three appearances and scored three times in the league. Despite the relegation, Wilson vowed to help the club bounce back to the Scottish Premiership, as he was keen to stay at Hearts when they would be in the Scottish Championship.

In his second season at Hearts, Wilson stated he was looking forward to playing in the Scottish Championship, and he scored the club's first goal of the season in the Championship against his former club Rangers which he refused to celebrate. Hearts went on to win 2–1. Wilson was soon on the sidelines when he strained his hamstring. Wilson made his return against Queen of the South and scored his second goal of the season, as well as providing two assists in a 4–1 win. Wilson captained Hearts through the 2014/15 season as they won the Championship and gained promotion to the Premiership. Near the end of the season, it was reported by BBC Sport that Wilson had exercised a clause in his contract allowing him to become a free agent.

=== Return to Rangers ===
After leaving Hearts, Wilson signed a three-year contract with Rangers on 22 June 2015. Wilson made his second debut for Rangers against Hibernian in the first round of the Challenge Cup on 25 July 2015. Over the course of the subsequent season, he played in central defence alongside Rob Kiernan. The pair, however, received criticism for some of their performances.

=== Colorado Rapids ===
On 29 January 2018, Wilson signed a three-year contract with Major League Soccer side Colorado Rapids. He made his debut for the club on 27 February 2018 in their CONCACAF Champions League match against Toronto FC, starting in the 0–0 draw.

Wilson scored his first goal for the Colorado Rapids on 11 May 2019 in a 3–2 home defeat against Real Salt Lake. He scored his second goal a month later on 28 June against Los Angeles FC, a lone 49th minute goal to give the Rapids a 1–0 home victory.

Wilson was waived by Colorado on 2 January 2024.

=== Queen's Park ===
On 1 February 2024, Wilson's return to Scotland was confirmed when he joined Scottish Championship club Queen's Park on an eighteen-month contract. On 18 July 2024, Wilson had his contract terminated by mutual consent.

=== Livingston ===
On 15 October 2024, Wilson joined hometown club Livingston on a short-term contract until January 2025. On 31 December 2024, the contract was extended to the end of the season. After copleting a further season at the club, he left Livi in May 2026 after activating a relegation release clause.

=== Sporting JAX ===
Wilson returned to America in July 2026, signing with United Soccer League side Sporting Club Jacksonville, whose sporting director, Mark Warburton, managed Wilson at Rangers.

== International career ==
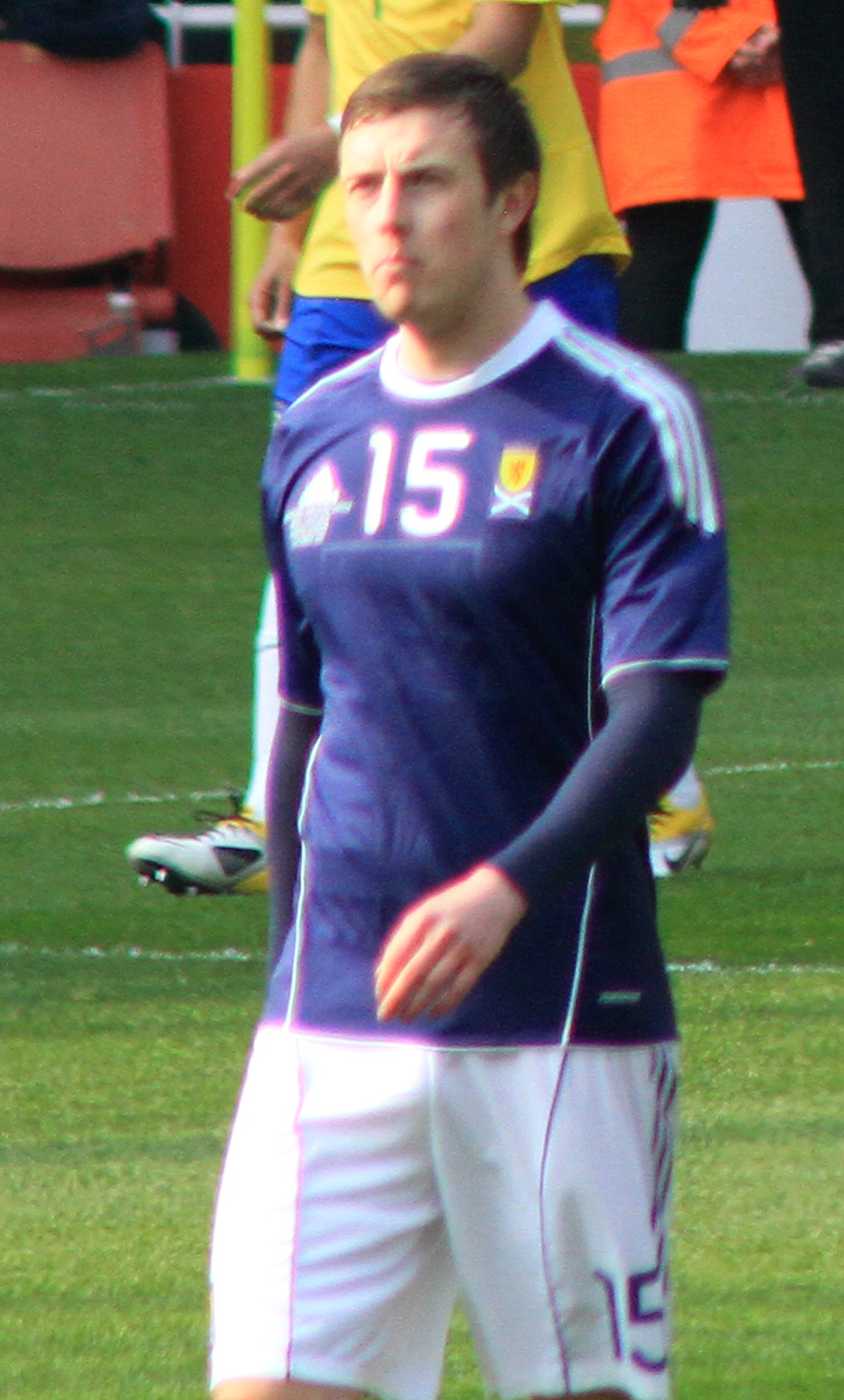
Wilson playing for Scotland against Brazil.

=== Youth teams ===
Wilson has represented Scotland throughout various underage levels, including captaining the under-19 national football team and features for the under-21 side, He has been involved in the international set-up since the age of 15 and captained the under-19s during 2009. Due to his lack of regular first team football, Wilson dropped back into the under-21 team in October 2011. He was a regular for the Under-21s in their 2013 UEFA European Under-21 Championship qualifying campaign and eventually made five appearances for the team.

=== Senior team ===
On 16 November 2010, Wilson played his first ever game for Scotland, scoring on his debut in a 3–0 win in a friendly against the Faroe Islands. On 27 March 2011, he came off the bench to play against Brazil in a friendly match at the Emirates Stadium. In an important 2012 European Championship qualifying game against the Czech Republic, Wilson came on as a substitute and conceded a late penalty which allowed the Czechs to claim a late point at 2–2. However replays of the incident showed that the Czech player involved, Jan Rezek, had dived under Wilson's challenge, and the referee Kevin Blom later admitted that he had been deceived.

== Career statistics ==
=== Club ===
As of match played 17 May 2026

Appearances and goals by club, season and competition
Club	Season	League			National cup (Note: Includes the Scottish Cup, FA Cup, and U.S. Open Cup)		League cup (Note: Includes the Scottish League Cup and Football League Cup)		Continental		Other		Total	
Club	Season	Division	Apps	Goals	Apps	Goals	Apps	Goals	Apps	Goals	Apps	Goals	Apps	Goals
Rangers	2009–10	Scottish Premier League	14	1	5	0	3	0	2 (Note: Appearance(s) in UEFA Champions League)	0	—		24	1
Liverpool	2010–11	Premier League	2	0	0	0	1	0	5 (Note: Appearance(s) in UEFA Europa League)	0	—		8	0
Liverpool	2011–12	Premier League	0	0	0	0	1	0	—		—		1	0
Liverpool	2012–13	Premier League	0	0	0	0	0	0	0	0	—		0	0
Liverpool	Total		2	0	0	0	2	0	5	0	—		9	0
Blackpool (loan)	2011–12	Championship	6	0	4	0	—		—		0	0	10	0
Bristol City (loan)	2012–13	Championship	1	0	—		—		—		—		1	0
Heart of Midlothian (loan)	2012–13	Scottish Premier League	13	0	—		0	0	—		—		13	0
Heart of Midlothian	2013–14	Scottish Premiership	32	4	1	0	4	1	—		—		37	5
Heart of Midlothian	2014–15	Scottish Championship	31	5	0	0	1	0	—		1 (Note: Appearance(s) in Scottish Challenge Cup)	0	33	5
Heart of Midlothian	Total		63	9	1	0	5	1	—		1	0	70	10
Rangers	2015–16	Scottish Championship	30	1	6	0	2	0	—		4	0	42	1
Rangers	2016–17	Scottish Premiership	21	0	1	0	4	0	—		—		26	0
Rangers	2017–18	Scottish Premiership	14	3	0	0	1	0	0	0	—		15	3
Rangers	Total		65	4	7	0	7	0	0	0	4	0	83	4
Colorado Rapids	2018	MLS	23	0	0	0	—		1 (Note: Appearance(s) in CONCACAF Champions League)	0	—		24	0
Colorado Rapids	2019	MLS	20	2	1	0	—		—		—		21	2
Colorado Rapids	2020	MLS	9	0	0	0	—		—		2 (Note: One appearance in MLS is Back Tournament; One appearance in MLS Cup playoffs)	0	11	0
Colorado Rapids	2021	MLS	29	2	—		—		—		1 (Note: Appearance(s) in MLS Cup playoffs)	0	30	2
Colorado Rapids	2022	MLS	26	0	1	0	—		2	0	—		29	0
Colorado Rapids	2023	MLS	29	1	2	0	—		—		2 (Note: Appearance(s) in Leagues Cup)	0	33	1
Colorado Rapids	Total		136	5	4	0	—		3	0	5	0	148	5
Colorado Rapids 2	2022	MLS Next Pro	1	0	—		—		—		—		1	0
Queen's Park	2023–24	Scottish Championship	10	0	—		—		—		—		10	0
Queen's Park	2024–25	Scottish Championship	0	0	0	0	2	0	—		—		2	0
Queen's Park	Total		10	0	0	0	2	0	—		—		12	0
Livingston	2024–25	Scottish Championship	21	4	3	0	—		—		6 (Note: Two appearances in Scottish Challenge Cup; Four appearances, three goals in Scottish Premiership play-offs)	3	30	7
Livingston	2025–26	Scottish Premiership	32	1	0	0	4	1	—		—		13	1
Livingston	Total		53	5	3	0	4	1	—		6	3	43	8
Sporting Club Jacksonville	2026	USL Championship	0	0	0	0	0	0	—		—		0	0
Career total			363	24	24	0	23	2	10	0	16	3	436	29

=== International ===
Appearances and goals by national team and year
National team	Year	Apps	Goals
Scotland	2010	1	1
Scotland	2011	4	0
Total		5	1

Scores and results list Scotland's goal tally first, score column indicates score after each Wilson goal.

List of international goals scored by Danny Wilson
No.	Date	Venue	Opponent	Score	Result	Competition
1	16 November 2010	Pittodrie Stadium, Aberdeen, Scotland	Faroe Islands	1–0	3–0	Friendly

== Honours ==
Rangers

- Scottish Premier League: 2009–10
- Scottish Cup: 2009
- Scottish League Cup: 2010
- Scottish Championship: 2015–16
- Scottish Challenge Cup: 2015–16

Heart of Midlothian

- Scottish Championship: 2014–15

Livingston

- Scottish Challenge Cup: 2024–25
- Scottish Premiership play-offs: 2025

Individual

- PFA Scotland Young Player of the Year: 2009–10
- SFWA Young Player of the Year: 2009–10
- Scottish Championship PFA Scotland Team of the Year: 2014–15
