= Gnana Rajasekaran =

Indian filmmaker

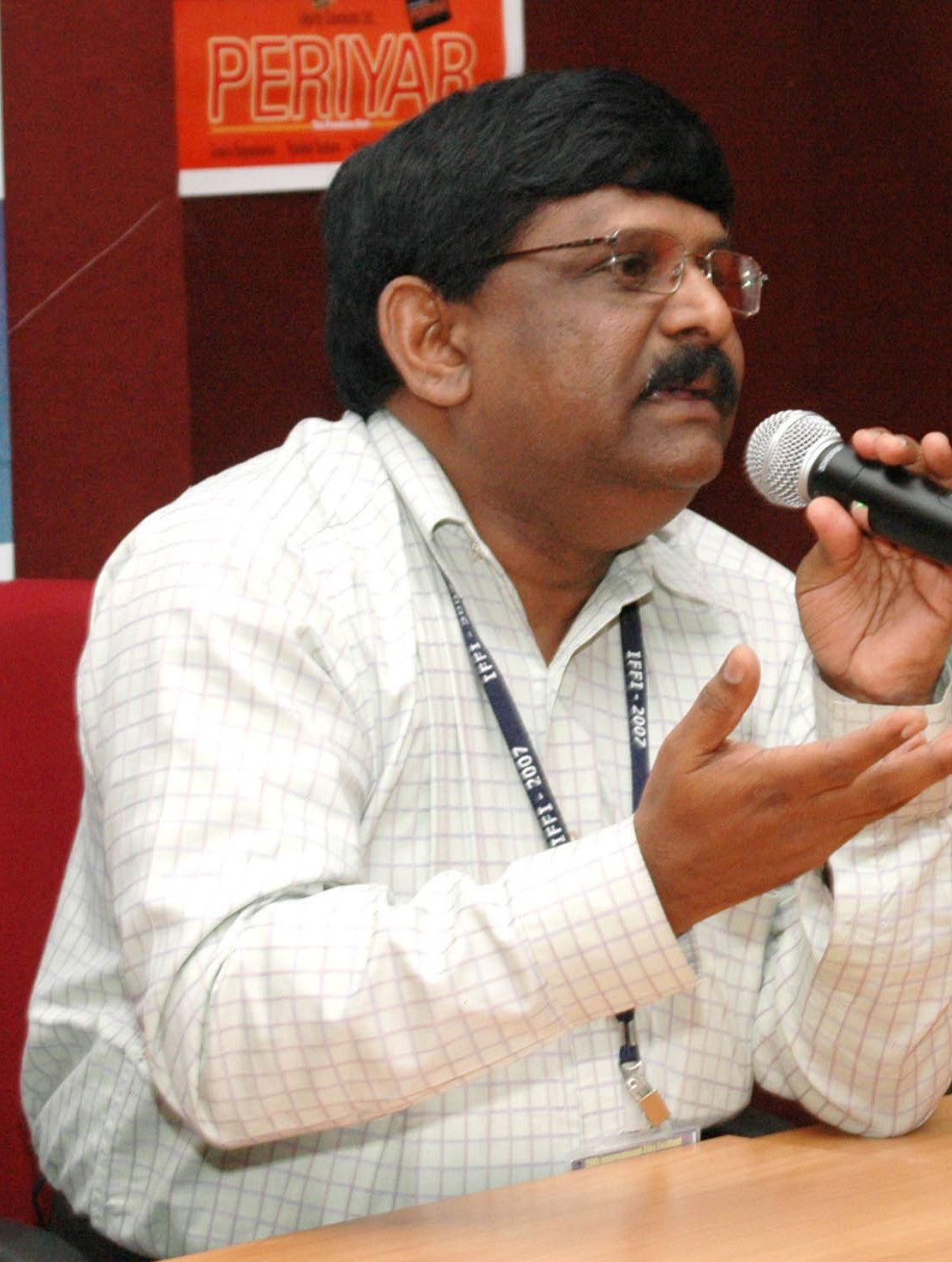
- Born: 23 January 1953 (age 73); Pallikonda, North Arcot district, Madras State (now in Vellore district, Tamil Nadu), India
- Occupation: Filmmaker
- Spouse: Sakunthala Rajasekaran

Gnana Rajasekaran (born 23 January 1953) is an Indian filmmaker, screenwriter, playwright and Retired IAS Officer. His directional debut was Mogamul (1994) won the Indira Gandhi Award for Best Debut Film of a Director. His other works include Bharathi (2000), Periyar (2007) and Ramanujan (2014). As of 2014, Rajasekaran has won three National Film Awards, three Tamil Nadu State Film Awards. His films have been screened at international film festivals including the International Film Festival of India.

== Early life ==
Gnana Rajasekaran was born in Pallikonda, Vellore district, Tamil Nadu, India, to Gnanaprakasam and Sharadambal, both teachers. He graduated with a BSc in Physics from Sacred Heart College, Tiruppatur; he gained a master's degree in physics from the Presidency College, Chennai. After he graduated, he worked as a technical officer with the Intelligence Bureau in Mumbai for four years, where many of his plays were staged. In 1983, he was appointed to the Indian Administrative Service, and was allotted the Kerala Cadre. Rajasekaran married Sakunthala Chidambaram in 1985, and they have two daughters, Sindhu Rajasekaran and Nandita Rajasekaran.

== Career ==
Before his career as a film-maker, Rajasekaran published an allegorical novel titled Yanai Kuthirai Ottagam, which was judged the best novel of the year by the Tirupur Tamil Sangam. He has written and directed several plays including a collection of three plays titled Vayiru (published in 1980) and the 1996 Hindi version of the play won an all India award for the best script.

Rajasekaran's debut film, Mogamul (1995), is based on the novel written by Thi. Janakiraman. The film won the Indira Gandhi Award for Best Debut Film of a Director at the 42nd National Film Awards and the Special Jury Award for Best film at the 48th National Film Awards. He then went on to direct the Nassar-starrer Mugam (1999), with the film fetching poor reviews and faring badly at the box office. Bharathi (2000), is a biography of the Tamil poet Subramanya Bharathi. The film starred the Marathi actor Sayaji Shinde and Devayani. The film won four National Film Awards and six Tamil Nadu State Film Awards. Periyar (2007), a biopic on E.V.Ramaswamy, focused on the history of the Dravidian movement, collating various incidents of the period. The film starred Satyaraj and Khushbu, and won the Best Feature Film in Tamil at the 48th National Film Awards and was screened in various international film festivals. Ramanujan (2014) is a biographical film based on the life of Indian mathematician Srinivasa Ramanujan. The film received mixed reviews from critics.

Rajasekaran has also directed various short films such as Oru Kan, Oru Parvai (1999, Tamil), Vivaram Onum Ariyam (Malayalam), Puthia Keralam (Malayalam) and Kanavu Nijamagum (Tamil, 2007).

Rajasekaran is the dean of SRM Sivaji Ganesan Film Institute, Chennai. He has held high positions in various public sector entities. He such as Secretary to Government for the 'Energy and Labour Departments' - Government of Kerala and Chairman for 'Kerala State Electricity Board'.

He also serves as a director on the board of BGR Energy Systems Ltd.

== Filmography ==
Year	Film	Notes
1995	Mogamul	Indira Gandhi Award for Best Debut Film of a Director
1999	Mugam	
2000	Bharathi	National Film Award for Best Feature Film in Tamil; Tamil Nadu State Film Award Special Prize
2007	Periyar	National Film Award for Best Feature Film in Tamil; Tamil Nadu State Film Award Special Prize
2014	Ramanujan	Tamil Nadu State Film Award for Best Film
2021	Ainthu Unarvugal	
