= R. Chudamani =

Indian Tamil writer (1931–2010)

- Born: Raghavan Chudamani; 10 January 1931; Madras, Tamilnadu
- Died: 13 September 2010 (aged 79)
- Occupation: Writer

Raghavan Chudamani (10 January 1931 – 13 September 2010) was an Indian writer writing in Tamil. She also wrote short stories in English as Chudamani Raghavan. Her name also appears as Choodamani.

== Early life ==
She was born in Chennai and grew up there. Because of a physical disability, she was schooled at home. She published her first story "Kaveri" in 1957. In 1960, she published her first novel Manathukku Iniyaval (Beloved woman). Her 1961 play Iruvar Kandanar (Two persons witnessed), which has been performed many times, received the Ananda Vikatan award. Her stories have been translated into other Indian languages. She also translated stories from other Indian languages into Tamil.

She received the Tamil Nadu Government Award in 1966, the Lilly Devasigamani Award in 1992 and the Kalagnar Mu Karunanidhi Award at the Chennai Book Fair in 2009.

== Selected works ==
- Pinju Mukham (Tender Face), novella (1959)
- Punnagai Poongothu, novel (1965)
- Magalin Kaigal (The Daughter's Hands), novella
- Pinju Mukham (Tender Face), novella
- Iravuchchudar (Night spark), novella (1974); translated into English as Yamini (1996)

== See also ==
- List of Indian writers
