= Ahmad Al-Qaq =

Palestinian footballer (born 2002)

Personal information
- Date of birth: February 20, 2002 (age 24)
- Place of birth: Hackensack, New Jersey, United States
- Height: 6 ft 0 in (1.84 m)
- Position: Midfielder

Team information
- Current team: Sporting Club Jacksonville
- Number: 11

Youth career
- PSA Stars
- 2016–2019: NC Fusion

College career
Years	Team	Apps	(Gls)
2020–2024	North Carolina Tar Heels	47	(6)

Senior career*
Years	Team	Apps	(Gls)
2021	Tobacco Road FC	10	(2)
2022	Wake FC	6	(1)
2025	North Carolina FC	24	(0)
2026–	Sporting Club Jacksonville	23	(3)

International career^{‡}
2025–	Palestine	9	(1)
- * Club domestic league appearances and goals as of November 8, 2026 ‡ National team caps and goals as of November 14, 2026

Ahmad Al-Qaq (Arabic: أحمد القاق; born February 20, 2002) is a professional soccer player who plays as a midfielder for USL Championship club Sporting Club Jacksonville. Born in the United States, he plays for the Palestine national team.

== Club career ==
Al-Qaq is a product of the youth academies of the American clubs PSA Stars and NC Fusion. In 2020 he committed to college at University of North Carolina at Chapel Hill, and joined their collegiate team Tar Heels, where he scored six goals in 47 appearances. In 2021, he had a short stint with USL League Two side Tobacco Road FC. In 2023, he returned to the USL League Two on another short stint with Wake FC.

On February 18, 2025, he signed a professional one-year contract with North Carolina FC in the USL Championship. On January 22, 2026, USL Championship expansion club Sporting Club Jacksonville announced Al-Qaq had joined their inaugural roster.

== International career ==
Al-Qaq was born in the United States to Palestinian parents. He was called up to the Palestine national team for a set of 2026 FIFA World Cup qualification matches in June 2025. He debuted with Palestine in a 3–0 loss to the Basque Country on November 15, 2025.

== Personal life ==
Al-Qaq graduated from the University of North Carolina at Chapel Hill with a graduate degree in neuroscience in 2022, and a postgraduate M/S degree in 2025.

== Career statistics ==
=== International ===
As of match played October 2, 2026
Scores and results list Palestine's goal tally first, score column indicates score after each Al-Qaq goal.

List of international goals scored by Ahmad Al-Qaq
No.	Date	Venue	Opponent	Score	Result	Competition
1	October 2, 2026	Longxing Football Stadium, Chongqing, China	China	5–0	5–0	Friendly
