= Meadow House =

English musician, instrument builder and composer

Meadow House is the nom de plume of English musician, instrument builder and composer, Dan Wilson. Meadow House came to prominence after airplay on London's radio station, Resonance FM. His debut album, Tongue Under a Ton of Nine Volters, was released on the Alcohol Records record label in 2006. He was the winner of the 2007 Arts Foundation fellowship for electroacoustic music and was Sound and Music's "Embedded" composer-in-residence between 2014 and 2016 at Resonance FM. He is known to employ unusual methods of distributing his work, such as leaving cassettes or CDs anonymously in public places.

== Discography ==
=== Albums ===
- For Thee (cassette) – Cistern Overflow
- Making Naff Plumbers Blush (CD) – Cistern Overflow
- Hearts Should Fear Cloudy Counsel (CD) – Cistern Overflow
- Tongue Under a Ton of Nine Volters (CD) – Alcohol Records
- Radionics Radio: An Album of Musical Radionic Thought Frequencies (2016) – Sub Rosa

=== Singles ===
- Ashfordaisyak/ARC Split as Ashfordaisyak (CD) – Menschenfiend Productions
- "The Hermit" b/w "Leper in a Tumbledryer" (7") – Jonathon Whiskey

== Appears on compilations ==
- "Printar Study" – Leonardo Music Journal No. 17 My Favorite Supplement: The Joy of the Gizmo
- "Tit For Tat" – The Wire Tapper No. 12 – The Wire issue 250
- "The Penguin Story" – Unknown Public No. 14 Bloody Amateurs
