= Sporting Club Jacksonville =

American professional soccer club based in Jacksonville

- Full name: Sporting Club Jacksonville
- Short name: Sporting JAX
- Founded: August 30, 2022; 4 years ago
- Stadium: Hodges Stadium
- Capacity: 12,000
- Owners: Ricky Caplin (majority); Tony Allegretti; Tim Tebow; Fred Taylor
- Head coach: Liam Fox
- League: USL Championship
- 2026: TBD
- Website: sportingjax.com
Home colors	Away colors

Sporting Club Jacksonville, commonly known as Sporting JAX, and less commonly as the Ocean Blue, Rivermen, or the Whales is an American professional sports club based in Jacksonville, Florida that competes in the USL Championship.

Founded in 2022, the club's men's team began playing in 2026.

== History ==
=== Founding ===
A USL Championship club in Jacksonville was announced on August 30, 2022, led by venture capitalist Ricky Caplin and former Heisman Trophy-winning quarterback Tim Tebow. The group partnered with Florida Elite Soccer Academy, rebranding it as the Sporting JAX Soccer Academy, to form a full development pathway.

The club expanded its leadership team on November 30—coinciding with the 30th anniversary of the NFL awarding Jacksonville its franchise—by adding former Jacksonville Jaguars star Fred Taylor to the ownership group.

Sporting Club Jacksonville, branded as Sporting JAX, and sometimes nicknamed the Whales, was officially unveiled on December 12, 2023, along with its logo and team colors.

=== USL Championship era ===
Mark Warburton, best known for leading Rangers FC to the Scottish Premiership in 2016, was named Sporting Director and Head of Soccer on March 20, 2025. He oversees both the men’s and women’s teams.

On November 4, 2025, Sporting JAX appointed former Dundee United manager Liam Fox as the first head coach in men's team history. The role marked his first coaching position outside Scotland. Fox signed a two-year contract, with an option for a third year. Upon his appointment, he described the opportunity as “a brilliant challenge to build a club from the bottom up,” noting that Sporting JAX had no signed players and no permanent stadium at the time of his arrival.

The USL Championship announced on December 11, 2025, that Sporting JAX would play its inaugural home match on March 7, 2026 against Hartford Athletic at Hodges Stadium on the campus of the University of North Florida (UNF).

On December 15, 2025, Sporting JAX announced the first two signings to its inaugural roster: defender Dida Armstrong and forward Luc Granitur.

On March 24, 2026, Sporting JAX announced that they had parted ways with CEO Steve Livingstone, while simultaneously promoting Mark Warburton to president of soccer.

== Women's team ==
On May 16, 2023, the JAXUSL group was awarded a conditional franchise in the USL Super League, contingent upon completing their soccer-specific stadium.

The club's women's team debuted in 2025. They are coached by Stacey Balaam, former Associate Head Coach of Vanderbilt Commodores women's soccer.

== Ownership and staff ==
=== Ownership ===
As of April 22, 2025

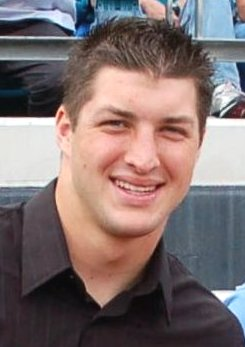
Tim Tebow, Minority Owner

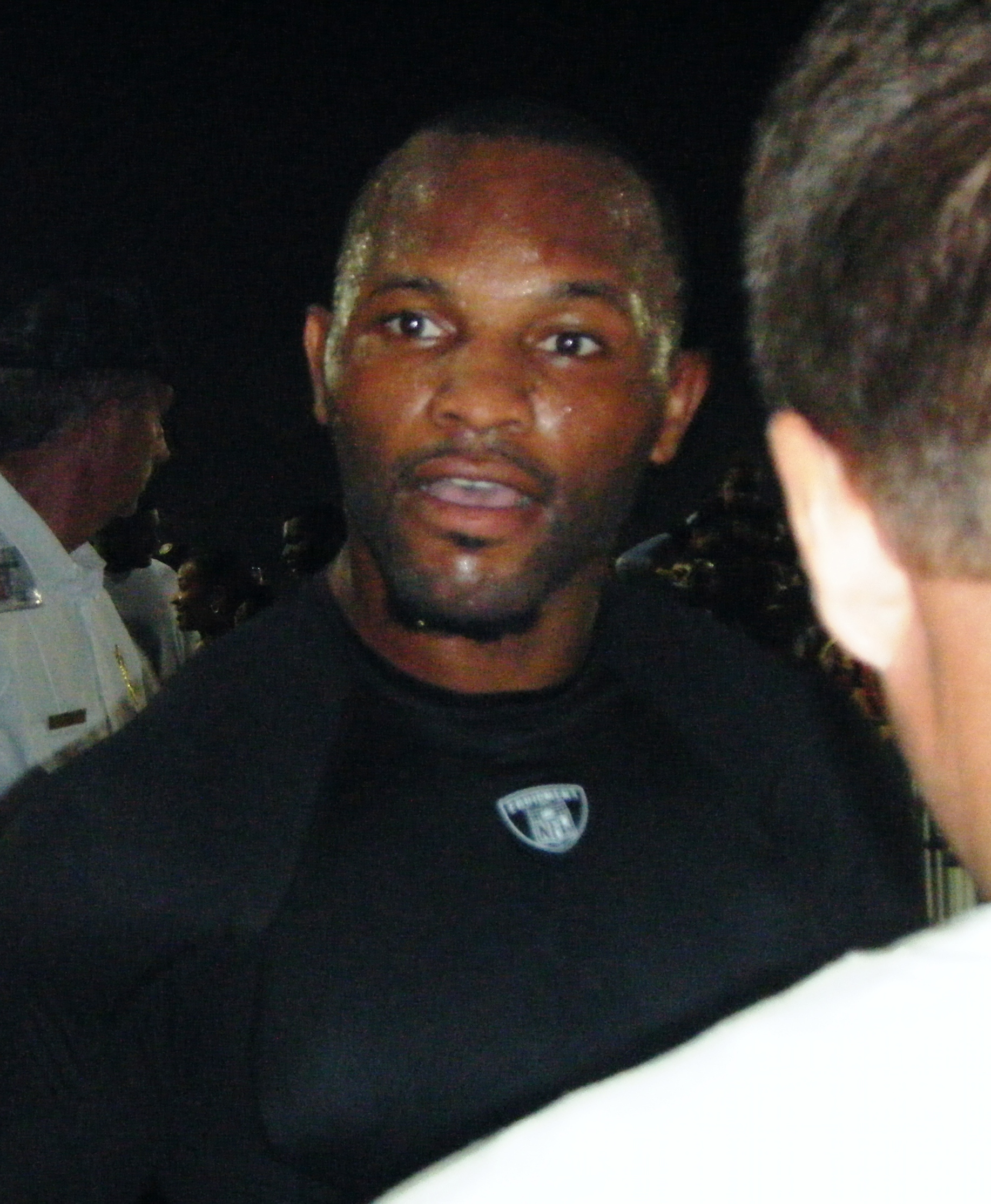
Fred Taylor, Minority Owner

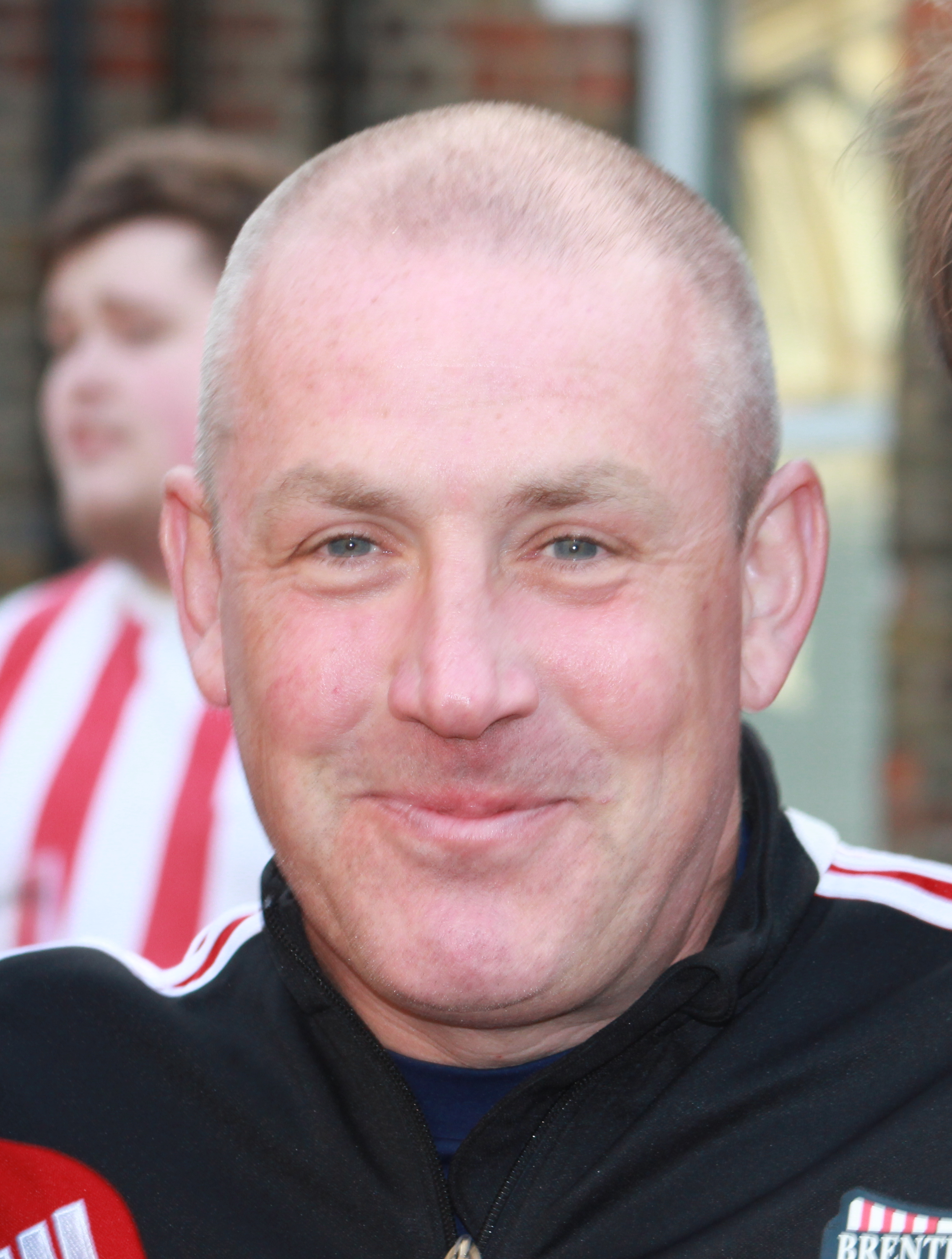
Mark Warburton, Head of Soccer, Sporting Director

Ownership
Majority owner	Ricky Caplin
Minority owner	Steve Livingstone
Minority owner	Tony Allegretti
Minority owner	Tim Tebow
Minority owner	Fred Taylor

As of February 5, 2026

Executive
Club President and CEO	Steve Livingstone
Executive Vice President of Business Management	J.J. Keitzer
Chief Community Officer	Tony Allegretti
Vice President of Ticket Sales & Service	Tim Hensley
Special Advisor to the President	Bob Ohrablo
Director of Marketing and Brand	David Phillips
Director of Broadcasting and Digital Content	Cole Pepper
Director of Ticket Sales and Services	Jack Gonzalez
Senior Manager, Business Operations and Development	Sara Garcia-Malone
Head of Operations	Marshall Happer
Merchandise Manager	Anthony Ortiz

=== Technical staff ===
As of February 5, 2026

Position	Name
Head of Soccer, Sporting Director	(England) Mark Warburton
Head coach	(Scotland) Liam Fox
Assistant Coach	(United States) Mike McGinty
Goalkeeper Coach	(Scotland) Gary Maley
Head Athletic Trainer	(United States) Eric Roman
Assistant Athletic Trainer	(Japan) Kota Takahashi
Head of Sports Performance	(United States) Steve Fell
Performance Physical Therapist	(United States) Austin Williams
Performance Fitness Coach	(United States) Dylan Boone
Equipment Manager	(Jamaica) Keneil Gibbs

== Stadium ==
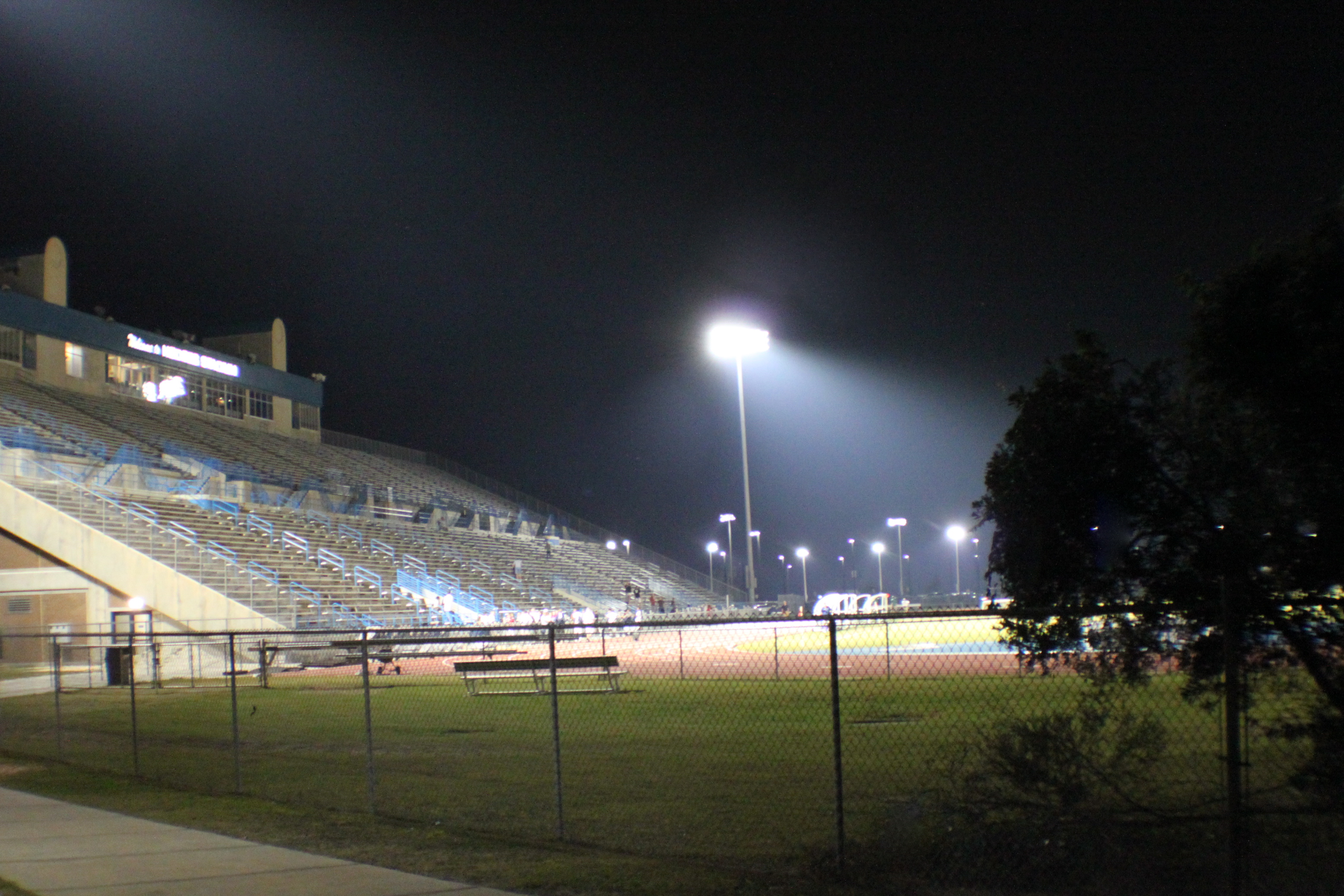
Hodges Stadium

Until the completion of their permanent home venue, Sporting JAX will play its home matches at Hodges Stadium on the campus of the University of North Florida. The stadium, which seats approximately 9,400 spectators, will serve as the club's temporary home beginning with its inaugural USL Super League season in 2025. The stadium's capacity can reach up to 12,000.

The club has announced plans to construct a new soccer-specific stadium in Jacksonville, with a target opening date in 2026 or 2027, subject to final approvals and construction timelines. The new facility is expected to accommodate approximately 15,000 spectators and serve as the long-term home for both the men's and women's teams.

On September 10, 2025, in a press release, it was announced that Orlando-based Momentous Sports, a private investment firm involved in sports and real estate development, is supporting the development of a mixed-use district surrounding a proposed Sporting JAX stadium, which is planned to include residential, retail, and community spaces. Its investor group includes former professional athletes such as John Elway, Blake Bortles, and Sporting JAX co-owner Tim Tebow, as well as business figures including Chick-fil-A CEO Andrew Cathy.

As of September 17, 2025, Zoe Haugen, president of Haugen Holdings—the public relations and marketing firm representing the club—confirmed that a previously reported site at the former Sears space in Regency Square Mall was no longer under consideration for the stadium location.

In December 2025, Sporting JAX president and CEO Steve Livingstone provided further details on the club's stadium plans in an interview with the Jacksonville Daily Record. While no stadium location had been announced as of January 8, 2026, he confirmed the proposed 15,000-seat stadium would be paired with a mixed-use development including retail, dining, hotel, and community spaces, and could include practice facilities for the club's youth academies. Livingstone also stated that the stadium is intended to serve as a year-round community venue capable of hosting high school championships, NCAA tournaments, markets, and other events.

On February 24, 2026, the club announced the appointment of Michael McNaughton as president of the Sporting JAX Development Company, responsible for the club's real estate and master-planning initiatives. McNaughton, a real estate executive with more than 30 years of experience in large-scale and mixed-use development, will lead plans for a purpose-built sporting district intended to serve as the permanent home of the club's men's and women's teams. He previously held senior roles with Westfield Corporation, where he was involved in U.S. development projects including the redevelopment of the World Trade Center in Lower Manhattan, and served as founder and chief operating officer of Rouse Properties.

On March 2, 2026, Sporting JAX announced that its proposed permanent stadium and surrounding development would be located in the St. Johns Town Center area, marking the first time the club publicly identified a specific area of Jacksonville for the project. The organization described the initiative as a "transformative mixed-use sporting and entertainment district," centered on a 15,000-seat soccer-specific stadium intended to serve as the permanent home of both its men's and women's teams. The club did not announce a timeline or funding for the project, but want to "hit the ground running" when the permitting is completed.

== Current roster ==
As of November 1, 2026

Note: Flags indicate national team as defined under FIFA eligibility rules; some limited exceptions apply. Players may hold more than one non-FIFA nationality.

No.	Pos.	Nation	Player
1	GK	USA	Jake McGuire
2	DF	IRL	Harvey Neville
3	DF	USA	Tyshawn Rose
4	DF	USA	Ethan Dudley
6	MF	ENG	Jordan Rossiter
7	FW	ENG	Jacob Evans
8	MF	MAS	Wan Kuzain
9	FW	USA	Adam Luckhurst
10	MF	IRL	Kieran Sadlier
11	MF	PLE	Ahmad Al-Qaq
12	DF	VEN	Edgardo Rito
13	DF	USA	Ventura Alvarado
14	MF	BRA	Jean Mota
15	DF	ENG	Ryan Edwards

No.	Pos.	Nation	Player
16	FW	FIN	Emil Jääskeläinen
17	FW	USA	Zeke Soto
18	DF	GHA	Wahab Ackwei
19	MF	ENG	Rafferty Pedder
21	DF	CAN	Marcus Godinho
22	DF	USA	Antonio Gomez (on loan from Austin FC II)
24	MF	USA	Thomas Roberts
26	MF	USA	Luc Granitur
27	DF	SCO	Danny Wilson
32	MF	LBR	Brem Soumaoro
42	GK	COL	Esteban Casas
44	MF	SKN	Raheem Somersall
77	DF	USA	Dida Armstrong
99	DF	SEN	Mohamed Traore

=== Academy players ===
Note: Flags indicate national team as defined under FIFA eligibility rules; some limited exceptions apply. Players may hold more than one non-FIFA nationality.

No.	Pos.	Nation	Player
23	MF	USA	Jack Proctor
28	MF	USA	Ethan Underwood

=== Club captains ===
Years	Name	Nation
2026–present	Ryan Edwards	England

== Uniforms ==
Sporting JAX unveiled its inaugural home kit for the 2025–26 season during a public launch event and Fan Fest at Friendship Fountain on May 13, 2025. Designed in collaboration with Adidas, the kit features a custom light blue jersey accented with bold orange Adidas three-stripe detailing. Caplin Ventures, owned by majority owner Ricky Caplin, appears as the primary shirt sponsor. The launch marked a major milestone for the club as it enters USL competition and aimed to unify its professional, pre-professional, and academy teams under a single visual identity.

Period	Kit Manufacturer	Shirt Sponsor	Back Sponsor	Sleeve Sponsor
2026–present	Adidas	Sporting JAX Foundation	PRI Productions (top); VyStar Credit Union (bottom)	Price.com

The home kit will be worn across all Sporting JAX teams, including those in USL League Two, USL W League, and the Sporting JAX Academy. The event also showcased goalkeeper kits, alternate and youth academy kits, as well as training wear and equipment. Players from the club's men's and women’s pre-professional teams modeled the kits, with the event drawing hundreds of fans and featuring appearances from club executives, coaching staff, and adidas representatives.

== Media ==
Sporting JAX maintains a growing presence in local media through strategic partnerships with television, radio, and digital platforms in the Jacksonville area. These outlets provide fans with comprehensive coverage of Sporting JAX, the USL Championship, the USL Super League, and global soccer news.

Media Coverage
WJXX/WTLV	Sporting JAX Report
WJXL (1010 AM)	The Coaches Show
WFXJ (930 AM)	The Sporting JAX Soccer Hour

In addition to traditional media coverage, the club produces a podcast titled, The Sporting Pod, hosted by Cole Pepper and featuring regular appearances from team officials and players. It's available through Apple Podcasts, Spotify, and YouTube. Emerson Burris serves as the club’s official team reporter.

On April 25, 2025, Sporting JAX expanded its outreach by partnering with Norsan Media to deliver Spanish-language broadcasts. As the club’s exclusive Spanish-language media partner, Norsan Media offers coverage via La Raza 92.9 FM, Kaliente 94.1 FM, and Hola News, aiming to engage and grow the local Hispanic fan base.

== Mascot ==
Rex, a 20-foot-tall T. rex statue, is the official mascot of Sporting JAX and was unveiled in April 2025. It is an iconic local landmark located on Beach Boulevard. The mascot features a steel frame covered with stucco, glowing red eyes, and a fierce jaw. He debuted during the club's inaugural season in August 2025.

Rex embodies the club's connection to the Jacksonville community and its local culture, appearing prominently at games and community events through inflatable T. rex costumes. Fans often participate in "Dino Dashes," races held during matches in which they wear the suits, similar in spirit to the popular T-Rex World Championship Races at Emerald Downs.

On August 22, 2026, during the women's team's opening home match of the 2026 USL Super League season, the club debuted Sporting Rex, an orange T. rex mascot wearing a Sporting JAX uniform.

== Supporter Culture ==
The club has an unofficial Supporter Group called the First Coast Ultras, a group founded during the early stages of the club's existence, and supports all departments of Sporting Club Jacksonville. The club currently inhabits parts of Section 108, though negotiations are ongoing regarding the new stadium the club plans to begin construction on soon.

== Community ==
In October 2025, Sporting JAX partnered with Gainbridge, the Gainbridge Super League and the Baxter E. Luther Boys & Girls Club of Northeast Florida to install a soccer mini-pitch in Florida. This initiative is part of their ongoing efforts to provide accessible soccer facilities and foster youth development in underserved communities.

Sporting JAX hosts an annual high school soccer media day at the Riverside YMCA, bringing together local student-athletes and coaches ahead of the upcoming season. The event features team and individual photos, interviews, and opportunities for local media coverage, promoting the sport and fostering community engagement.

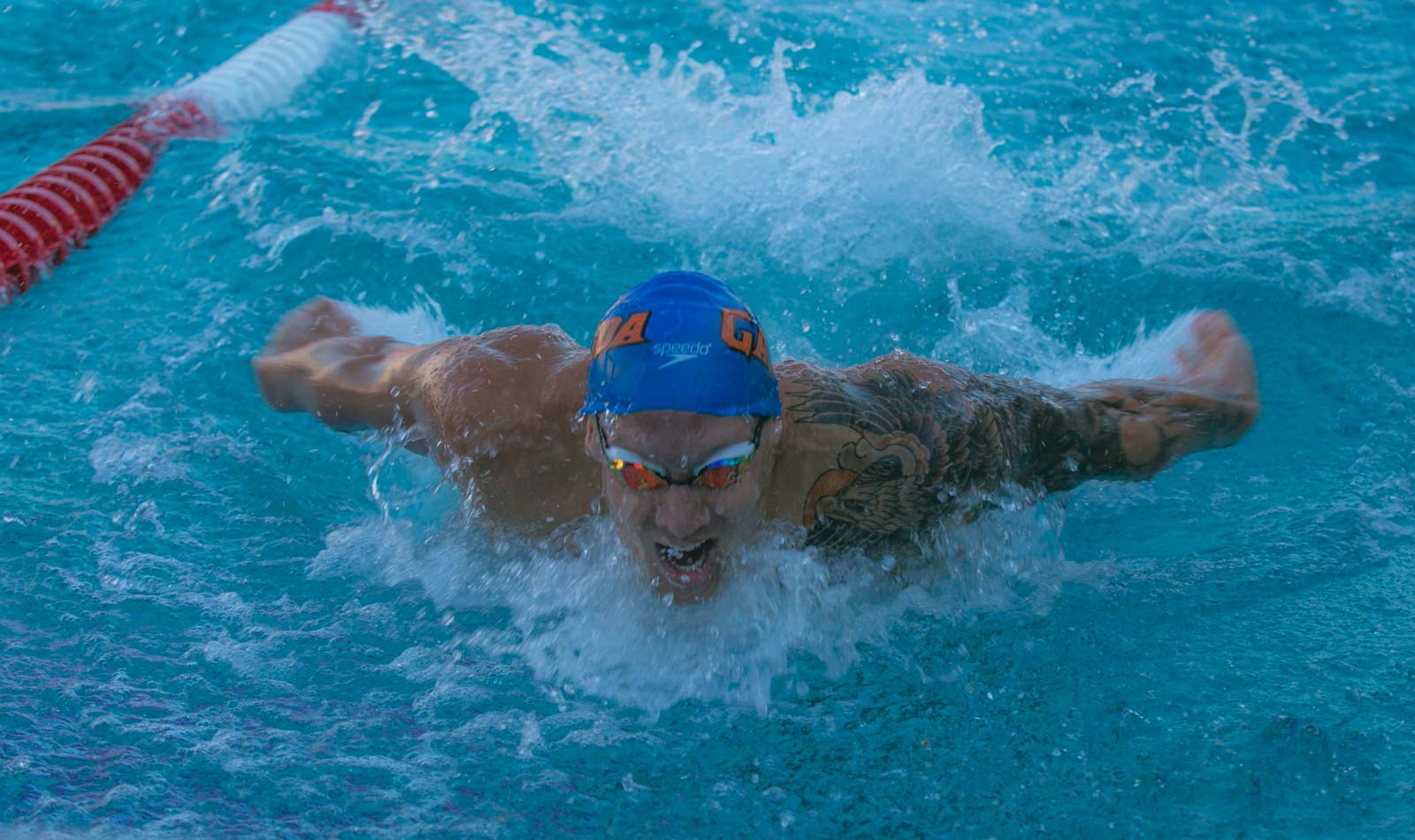
Caeleb Dressel in the 100m fly

=== Swimming ===
Sporting JAX Aquatic Club is the competitive swimming arm of Sporting Club Jacksonville, operating under the Sporting JAX umbrella in Northeast Florida. The club serves swimmers and triathletes, offering training and competition opportunities at various levels and participating in regional and national events.

In October 2025, Olympic gold‑medalist swimmer Caeleb Dressel joined Sporting JAX Aquatic Club to prepare for the 2028 Olympic Games, reuniting with his longtime coach, Steve Jungbluth.
