= Harvey Neville =

Footballer (born 2002)

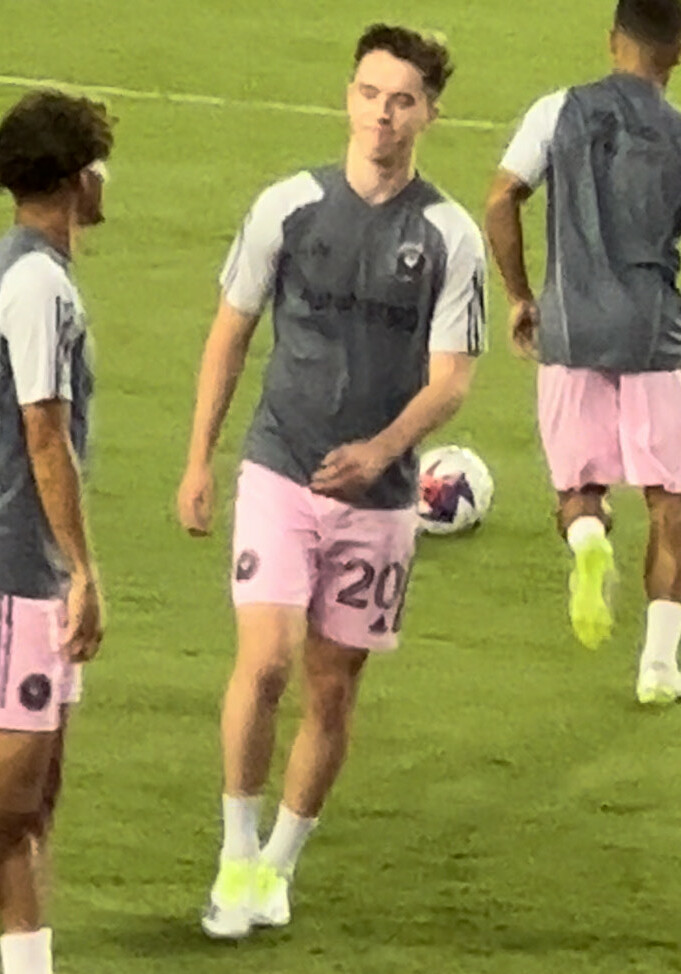
- Neville training with Inter Miami in 2023

Personal information
- Full name: Harvey James Neville
- Date of birth: 26 June 2002 (age 24)
- Place of birth: Manchester, England
- Height: 5 ft 11 in (1.81 m)
- Positions: Right-back; midfielder

Team information
- Current team: Sporting JAX
- Number: 2

Youth career
- Manchester United
- Manchester City
- 2015–2018: Valencia
- 2018–2021: Manchester United

Senior career*
Years	Team	Apps	(Gls)
2021–2023	Inter Miami II (Note: Fort Lauderdale CF changed its name to Inter Miami CF II in 2022)	42	(0)
2022–2023	Inter Miami	11	(0)
2023	→ Loudoun United (loan)	7	(0)
2024	Portland Timbers 2	22	(0)
2024	→ Sacramento Republic FC (loan)	10	(0)
2025	Phoenix Rising	5	(0)
2025	→ San Antonio FC (loan)	14	(1)
2026–	Sporting JAX	29	(0)

International career
2019	Republic of Ireland U19	1	(0)
- * Club domestic league appearances and goals as of 31 October 2026

Harvey James Neville (born 26 June 2002) is a professional footballer who plays as a right-back for USL Championship club Sporting JAX. Born in England, he has represented the Republic of Ireland at under-19 level. He is the son of former England player Phil Neville.

== Early life ==
Born on 26 June 2002, Neville is the son of former England international Phil Neville and nephew of another former England international Gary Neville. He began his career in the youth setup of his father's former club, Manchester United. He later moved and played with the youth squads at Manchester City and Spanish club Valencia.

In 2018, Neville returned to United, and in July 2020 signed his first professional contract.

== Club career ==
On 7 May 2021, Neville moved to the United States and signed with USL League One club Fort Lauderdale CF, the reserve affiliate of Major League Soccer side Inter Miami. He made his professional debut for the club on 22 May 2021 in a 2–1 defeat against the Chattanooga Red Wolves.

On 26 January 2022, Neville made his non-competitive debut for Inter Miami and scored during a 4–0 pre-season victory over Club Universitario de Deportes. On 11 May 2022, Neville made his competitive debut for Inter Miami as an 84th-minute substitute for DeAndre Yedlin during a 3–1 U.S. Open Cup win at home to Tormenta FC.

=== Inter Miami ===
Neville officially joined the Inter Miami first team roster on 23 August 2022, signing a deal through to the end of the 2024 season.

On 24 August 2023, Neville was loaned to USL Championship side Loudoun United.

On 16 March 2024, Inter Miami and Neville mutually agreed to terminate his contract.

=== Portland Timbers ===
On 16 March 2024, Portland Timbers 2 signed Neville ahead of their 2024 MLS NEXT Pro season opener. Just like at Inter Miami where his father was the head coach, at Portland Harvey was reunited with his father Phil Neville, who had been coaching the Portland Timbers MLS team since November 2023. Neville's contract with Portland expired following the 2024 season.

=== Phoenix Rising FC ===
Neville signed with Phoenix Rising FC on 21 January 2025. On 6 July 2025, Neville was loaned to USL Championship side San Antonio FC.

=== Sporting JAX ===
On 23 December 2025, via the club's website, USL Championship expansion team Sporting JAX announced Neville had joined their inaugural roster.

== International career ==
Neville qualifies for Republic of Ireland through his maternal grandmother. In October 2019, Neville was named in the Republic of Ireland U19 squad for the first time. He made his debut later that month in a loss to Denmark.

== Career statistics ==
As of match played 1 June 2023

Appearances and goals by club, season and competition
Club	Season	League			National Cup		Continental		Total	
Club	Season	Division	Apps	Goals	Apps	Goals	Apps	Goals	Apps	Goals
Inter Miami CF II	2021	USL League One	21	0	—		—		21	0
Inter Miami CF II	2022	MLS Next Pro	18	0	—		—		18	0
Inter Miami CF II	2023	MLS Next Pro	1	0	—		—		1	0
Inter Miami CF II	Total		40	0	—		—		40	0
Inter Miami CF	2022	Major League Soccer	1	0	1	0	—		2	0
Inter Miami CF	2023	Major League Soccer	10	0	2	0	—		12	0
Inter Miami CF	Total		11	0	3	0	—		14	0
Career total			51	0	3	0	0	0	54	0

== Honours ==
Inter Miami

- Leagues Cup: 2023
