= Edgardo Rito =

Venezuelan footballer (born 1996)

Personal information
- Full name: Edgardo José Rito Cuero
- Date of birth: 17 February 1996 (age 30)
- Place of birth: El Vigía, Venezuela
- Height: 1.74 m (5 ft 9 in)
- Position: Defender

Team information
- Current team: Sporting JAX
- Number: 12

Youth career
- Atlético El Vigía

Senior career*
Years	Team	Apps	(Gls)
2013–2014	Atlético El Vigía	26	(0)
2014–2015	ACD Lara	2	(0)
2015	Estudiantes de Caracas	0	(0)
2016–2021	Yaracuyanos F.C.	11	(1)
2016	→ Mineros de Guayana (loan)	11	(1)
2017–2018	→ Patriotas Boyacá (loan)	22	(0)
2018	→ Metropolitanos FC (loan)	17	(0)
2019–2020	→ New York Red Bulls II (loan)	34	(2)
2021–2022	Patriotas Boyacá	22	(1)
2022–2023	Oakland Roots	41	(7)
2023	Hartford Athletic	19	(0)
2024–2025	Phoenix Rising	30	(1)
2025	→ Caracas (loan)	0	(0)
2026–	Sporting JAX	22	(0)
- * Club domestic league appearances and goals as of 16:50, 8 November 2026 (UTC) ‡ National team caps and goals as of 02:57, 31 January 2018 (UTC)

Edgardo Rito (born 17 February 1996) is a Venezuelan footballer who plays as a defender for Sporting JAX of the USL Championship.

== Career ==
Rito, who plays as a right back and right midfielder, began his professional career with Atlético El Vigía in 2013. During the 2013/14 season he was a regular starter for the club appearing in 26 league matches. The following season he had a brief stint with ACD Lara. After his brief stint with Lara, Rito joined Estudiantes de Caracas, playing the Copa Venezuela.

On 13 January 2016 it was announced that Rito had signed with Second Division side Yaracuyanos F.C. He was then loaned to Mineros de Guayana by Yaracuyanos F.C. during the 2016 season. During his stint with Mineros, Rito helped the club qualify to the round of 16 of the Copa Venezuela. He scored his first goal for the club on 15 September 2016 in a 3–1 victory over his former club ACD Lara.

The following season he was again sent on loan, this time to Colombian side Patriotas Boyacá. He was a regular starter for Patriotas during the 2017 season as he appeared in 26 matches in all competitions, including 21 league matches. He made his debut in the Copa Sudamericana on 5 April 2017, appearing as a starter in a 1–0 loss to Chilean side Everton. For the 2018 season Rito returned to Venezuela joining Metropolitanos FC. He appeared in 17 matches for the club.

On 20 February 2019, Rito joined New York Red Bulls II on loan from Yaracuyanos F.C. He made his debut with the club on 24 March 2019, appearing as a starter in a 1–1 draw with Nashville SC.

Rito spent portions of the 2022 and 2023 seasons with the Oakland Roots, scoring 9 goals in 41 appearances. In June 2023, he joined the Hartford Athletic.

Rito signed with Phoenix Rising FC on 20 December 2023.

In January 2025, it was announced that Phoenix had loaned Rito to Venezuelan club Caracas F.C. for the 2025 season.

On 23 December 2025, USL Championship expansion team, Sporting Club Jacksonville, also known as Sporting JAX, announced via the team's website, that Rito had signed with the team.

== International ==
Rito was called up Venezuela national under-17 football team in 2012. During August 2014 Rito was called to participate in a training camp with the Venezuela national under-20 football team.

== Career statistics ==
As of 20 February 2019

Club performance		League		Cup		League Cup		Continental		Total	
Club	Season	Apps	Goals	Apps	Goals	Apps	Goals	Apps	Goals	Apps	Goals
Atlético El Vigía	2012-13	-	-	1	0	-	-	-	-	1	0
Atlético El Vigía	2013-14	26	0	0	0	0	0	-	-	26	0
Total		26	0	1	0	0	0	0	0	27	0
ACD Lara	2014-15	2	0	0	0	0	0	-	-	2	0
Estudiantes	2015	0	0	1	0	0	0	-	-	1	0
Mineros de Guayana (loan)	2016	11	1	2	0	0	0	-	-	13	1
Patriotas Boyacá (loan)	2017	21	0	4	0	0	0	1	0	26	0
Metropolitanos FC (loan)	2018	17	0	0	0	0	0	-	-	17	0
New York Red Bulls II (loan)	2019	15	1	0	0	0	0	-	-	15	1
Career total		92	2	8	0	0	0	1	0	101	1

== Honours ==
Individual

- USL Championship All League First Team: 2022
