= Thi. Janakiraman =

Indian writer (1921–1982)

- Born: Thi. Janakiraman; 28 June 1921
- Died: 18 November 1982 (aged 61)
- Writing career
- Language: Tamil
- Genres: Short Story, Novel, Novella
- Subject: Literature
- Notable awards: Sahitya Akademi Award (1979)

T. Janakiraman (also known as Thi Jaa, 28 June 1921 – 18 November 1982) is a Tamil writer from Tamil Nadu, India. He is one of the major figures of 20th century Tamil fiction.

== Early life ==
He was born in a Tamil Brahmin (Iyer) family of Madras Presidency in 1921. He worked as a civil servant. His writing included accounts of his travels in Japan and the Crimea.

== Career ==
His best-known novels are Mogamul, Sembaruthi, and Amma Vandhaal. These novels have feminine feelings embedded in their subjects. Though the story is spun around delicate feelings. His short stories such as "Langdadevi" (a lame horse) and "Mulmudi" (Crown of Thorns) follow the same style.

== Bibliography ==
Thi Jaa wrote about one hundred short stories and a dozen novels. His most noted work is the novel Mogamul (Thorn of Desire). His other novels Amma Vandhaal and Marappasu were translated into English as "Sins of Appu's Mother" and "Wooden Cow" respectively. He was noted for his short stories. In 1979, he was awarded the Sahitya Akademi Award for Tamil for his short story collection Sakthi Vaidhiyam. Some of his other notable works are Malar Manjam, Uyirthen and Semparuthy.

=== Novels ===
- Amirtham
- Malar Manjam
- Mogamul
- Anbe Aaramudhe
- Amma Vandhaal
- Uyirthen
- Semparuthi
- Marappasu
- Nalabaagam

=== Novellas ===
- Adi
- Sivagnanam
- Kamalam
- Naalavathu sir
- Avalum umiyum
- Thodu
- Veedu

=== Short story collections ===
- Kottumelam
- Sivappu Rickshaw
- Akbar Shastri
- Yaadhum Oore
- Pidi Karunai
- Sakthi Vaithiyam
- Manidhabimaanam
- Erumai Pongal
- Aboorva Manidhargal
- Vendam indha Poosanikkai

=== Translations ===
- Annai
- Kullan

=== Plays ===
- Doctorukku Marundhu
- Naalu Veli Nilam
- Vadivelu Vaathiyaar

=== Travelogues ===
- Udhaya Sooriyan - Travelouge about Japan
- Nadandhaai Vaazhi Kaveri
- Adutha Veedu Aimbadhu Mile
- Karunkadalum Kalaikkadalum
- Nalapakam

== See also ==
- List of Sahitya Akademi Award winners for Tamil
- List of Indian writers
- List of Tamil-language writers
