= Dan Wilson (playwright) =

American dramatist

Dan Wilson (born 1970) is an American playwright, actor, director, and improvisational comedian based in San Francisco, California. He is the author of six full length produced plays (In a Distant Country, 411, Vagina Dentata, 'Sweetie' Tanya: the demon barista of Valencia Street, Harvesting the Lost, and Just One More Game) and three produced one-acts (Pinch, Get it? Got it. Good! and All that and a Box of Donuts). Earlier in life, Dan attended North Park Theological Seminary in Chicago, Illinois and wrote and directed short dramas for use at Grace Evangelical Covenant Church. These short dramas are still in circulation and are performed in churches of many denominations around the world.

His seventh play, Silent City, is in development with Triple Shot Productions.

Wilson is also a performer on the improv podcast RadioStar Improv and has performed with the improv groups The Legal Briefs and Pharmarsupial. His forays into film have so far been limited to highly experimental independent feature films like The Invisible Forest (dir. Antero Alli) and Canary (dir. Alejandro Adams) and various shorts.

Wilson's production company, Cassandra's Call Productions, creates original theatrical, improvisational and film projects on a regular basis.
