= Dida Armstrong =

American soccer player (born 2004)

Personal information
- Date of birth: April 6, 2004 (age 22)
- Place of birth: Rutherfordton, North Carolina, United States
- Height: 5 ft 11 in (1.80 m)
- Position: Defender

Team information
- Current team: Sporting JAX
- Number: 77

Youth career
- 2018–2020: The STEM Preparatory Academy
- 2020–2022: AFC 615

Senior career*
Years	Team	Apps	(Gls)
2022–2025	St. Louis City 2	62	(4)
2026–	Sporting JAX	9	(0)
- * Club domestic league appearances and goals

Dida Armstrong (born April 6, 2004) is an American professional soccer player who plays as a defender for USL Championship club Sporting JAX.

== Early life and education ==
Dida Armstrong was born on April 6, 2004 in Rutherfordton, North Carolina. He comes from a family with connections to professional soccer. His father, Desmond, is a former United States national team defender, who was the first U.S.-born Black player to appear in a FIFA World Cup, and was inducted into the National Soccer Hall of Fame in 2012. Dida's brother Ezra, is also a professional player.

Armstrong played soccer in high school while at the STEM Preparatory Academy in Nashville, Tennessee.

== Club career ==
=== St. Louis City 2 ===
Armstrong joined St. Louis City 2, the MLS Next Pro affiliate of St. Louis City SC, in 2022. He has made multiple appearances for the club, playing primarily as a forward. By 2025, Armstrong had featured in over 60 matches and scored several goals in league competition.

=== Sporting JAX ===
In December 2025, Armstrong was announced as one of the first two signings for the newly formed Sporting JAX men's team, set to compete in the USL Championship beginning with the 2026 season. He was signed alongside forward Luc Granitur, marking a key moment for the expansion club's inaugural roster. For his time with Sporting JAX, he will switch to a defensive role.

== Media appearances ==
Armstrong appeared as a contestant on Fear Factor: House of Fear, a reboot of the reality competition series that premiered on Fox on January 14. Armstrong was one of 14 contestants competing in fear-based challenges filmed in a remote location in Canada and hosted by Johnny Knoxville, with a $200,000 grand prize at stake.

== Personal life ==
Armstrong supports Manchester City and is an avid gamer.
