= Michael Lieber =

British novelist and actor

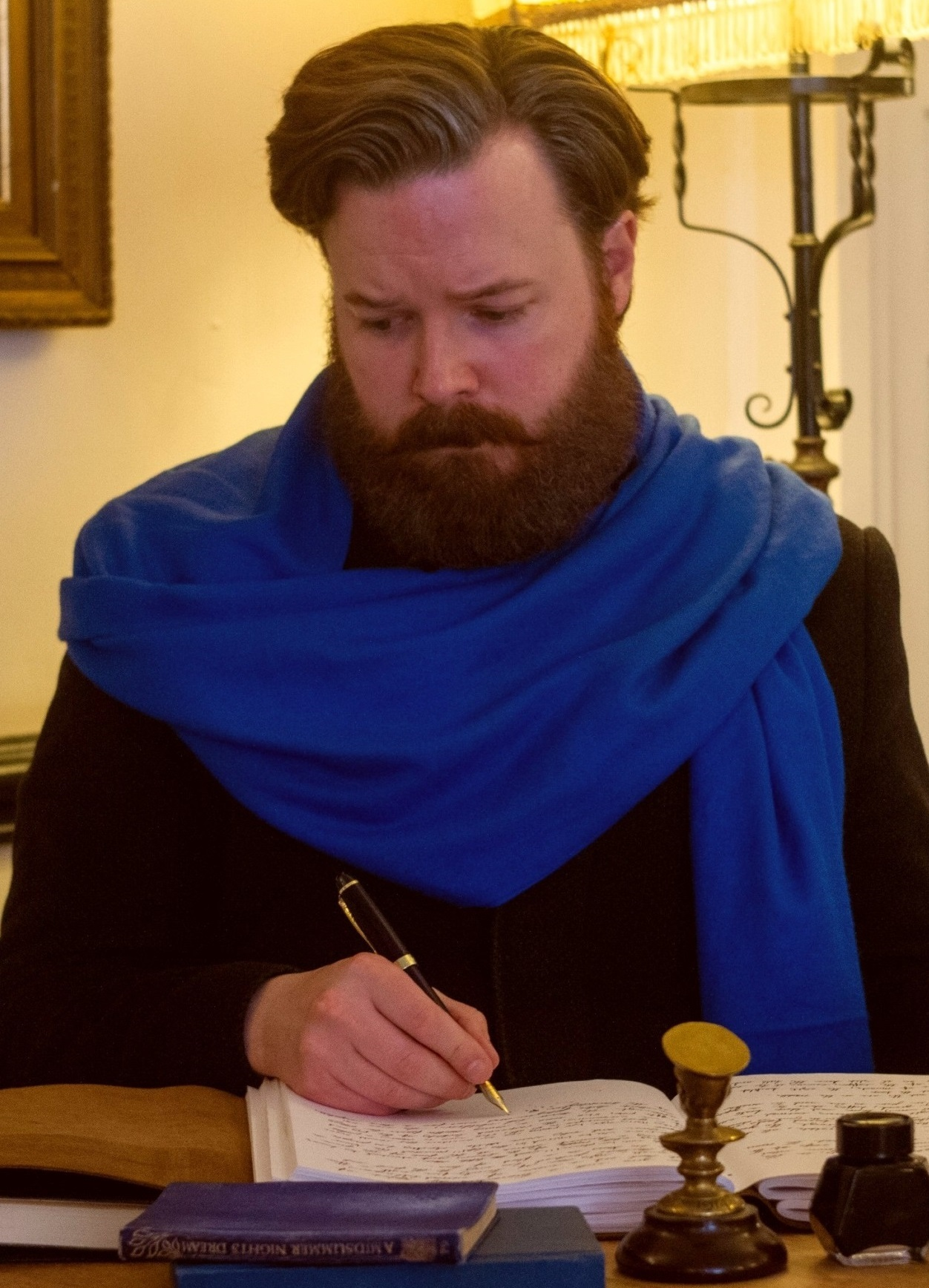
- Lieber in 2022
- Born: 6 May 1988 (age 38); UK
- Education: Maple Hayes Hall
- Occupations: Novelist, essayist and short-story writer
- Writing career
- Notable work: The War Hero

Signature
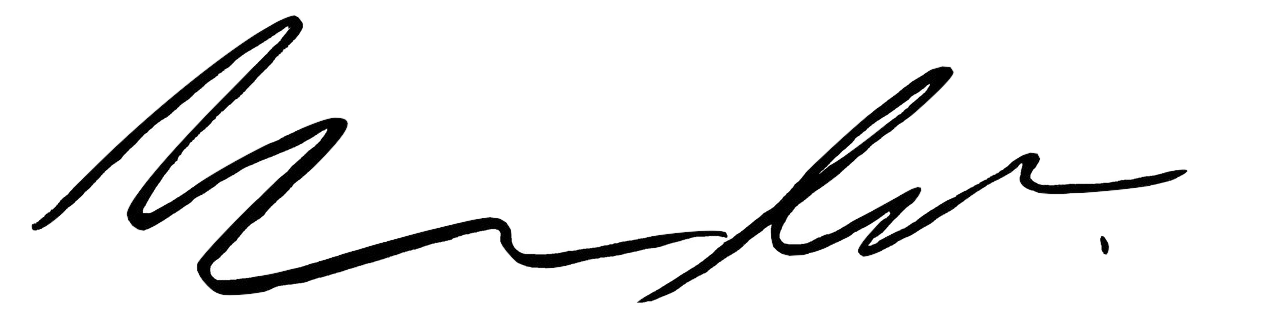

Michael Lieber (born 6 May 1988) is a British novelist, essayist and short story writer. Lieber's novels include The War Hero, The Boy and the Goldlock, and Helga Dune.

He has also appeared in films, his first being the 2013 biopic Ramanujan, a period drama set in 1914 about the life of mathematician Srinivasa Ramanujan. Lieber played mathematician John Edensor Littlewood, starring alongside Kevin McGowan, Cloudia Swann, and Richard Walsh. When preparing to play the part, Lieber spoke to professor Béla Bollobás who had worked with Littlewood.

In 2010, Lieber starred as the over-the-hill footballer Ray Keane in the play Transfer Deadline Day at the Courtyard Theatre in London. In 2017, he played the lead role of Mark Crowe in the psychological thriller A Room to Die For alongside Vas Blackwood.

== Early life ==
=== 1998–2001 ===
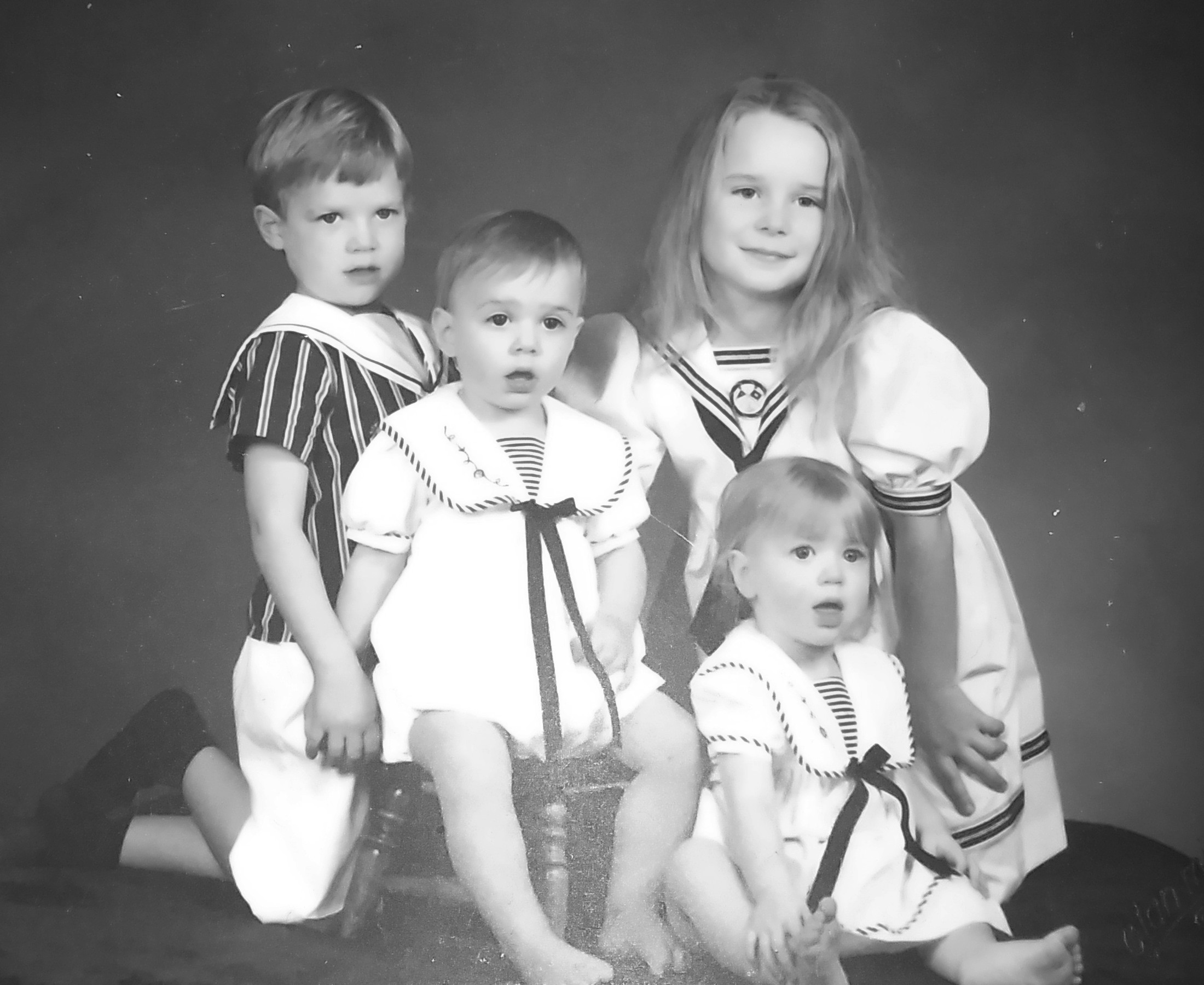
Lieber (far left) with his three siblings c. 1992, taken in Lichfield, England

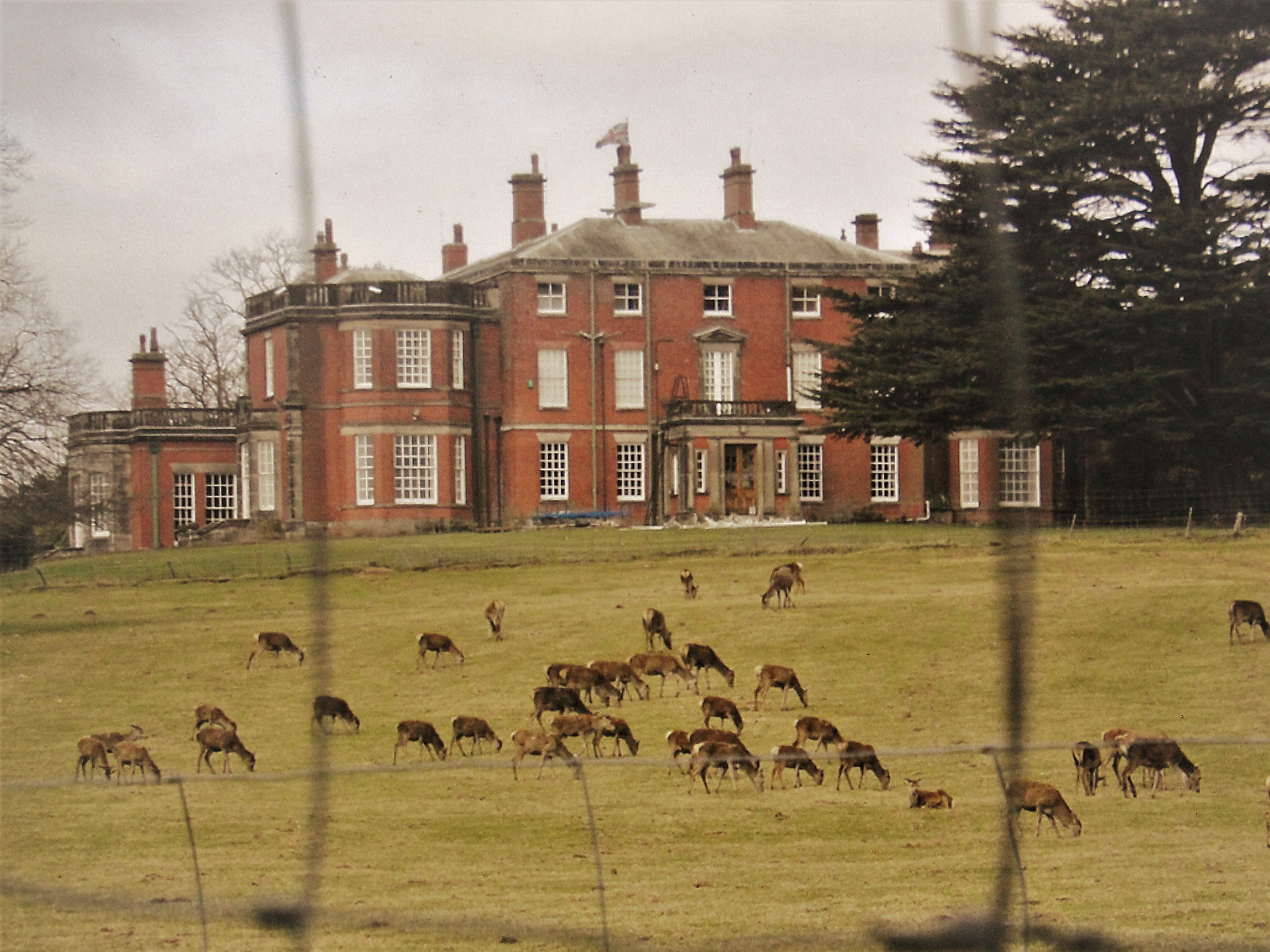
Maple Hayes Hall.

When Lieber was a child he was severely illiterate. In 1998, when he was aged 10, he was sent to attend school at the Maple Hayes School for Dyslexia in Lichfield, Staffordshire.

Maple Hayes was run by its father and son team, Dr Neville Brown and Dr Daryl Brown, who taught Lieber a new and revolutionary method of reading and writing called morpheme, also known as icon therapy. Lieber has stated that, although icon therapy is widely acknowledged now, it was originally only used on foreigners looking to learn English.

In 2018, Lieber dedicated his debut novel The War Hero to Maple Hayes Hall as well as the two Doctors, with the added inscription "thank you for the icons".

While living in Wales, aged 11, Lieber would perform magic tricks on the street to make up his pocket money. When Lieber was aged 13 in 2001, he appeared in a musical adaptation of the Charles Dickens classic Oliver Twist at the Garrick Theatre, he played one of Fagin's boys.

On the subject of acting, Lieber has remarked that it is a career and vocation that has ups and downs, as well as being a very noble profession. This early involvement in the theatre would later lead to a brief enrolment at the Oxford School of Drama.

== Career ==
=== The War Hero ===
Lieber's debut novel was the allegory thriller The War Hero, which was published on 13 December 2018 by British Cultural. Set in the 1920s, The War Hero took five years to complete and features many descriptions of the English countryside. Some notable locations used for inspiration include Up Holland and Aylesbury Vale. Notes from Lieber's travel diary were incorporated into the novel.

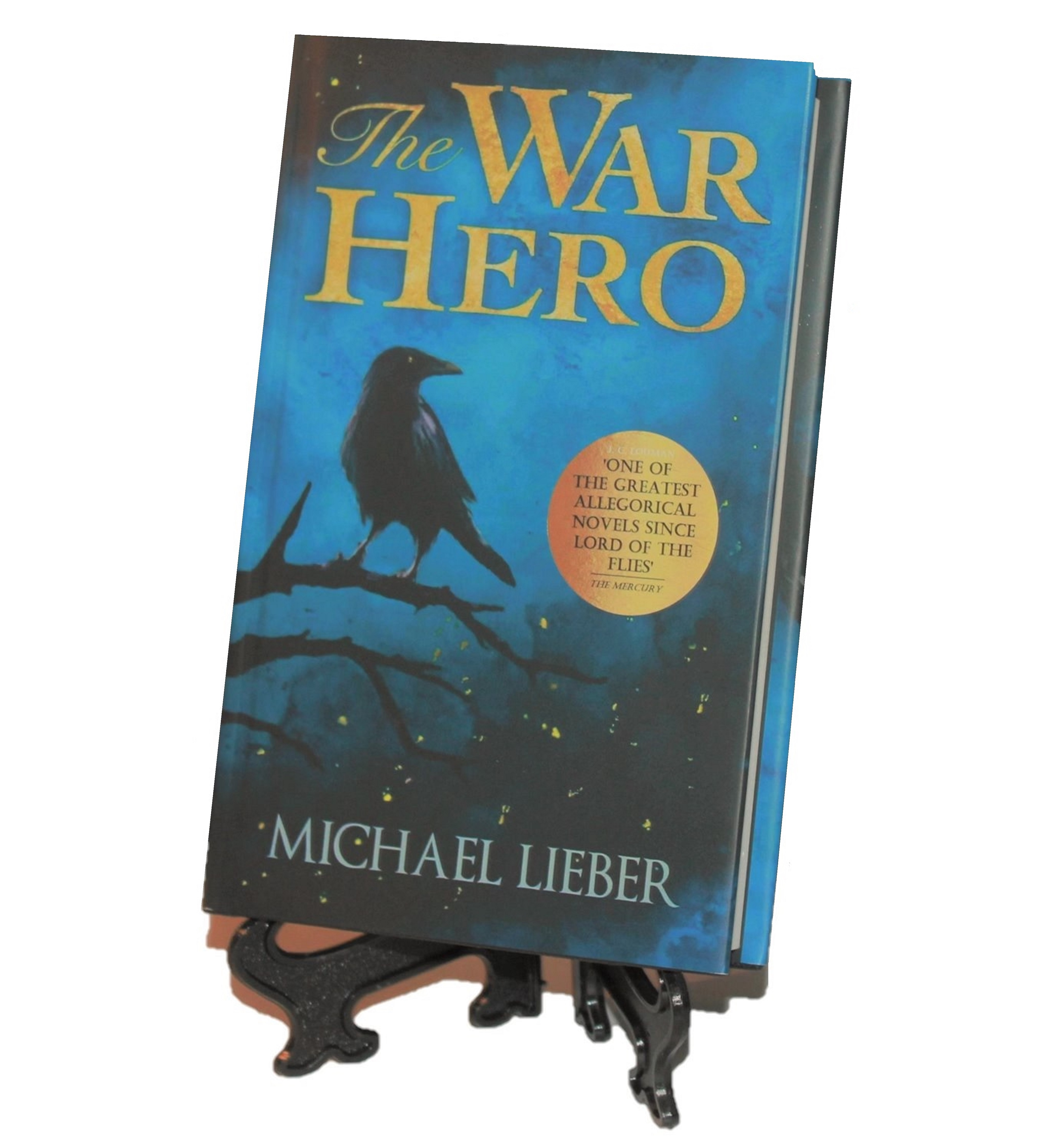
First Edition of The War Hero c. 2018.

The story focuses on a 65-year-old man celebrating his birthday at his country house. Slowly but surely, he realises one of the guests is not known to the others nor to him. When confronted in private, the guest explains he has been hired to murder him but allows the man to enjoy his party provided he agrees to meet him at the end of the evening.

I wanted to make sure the book would age well. I'm an avid reader and I'm very conscious of novels that don't hold up well because they're too topical. I wanted to make sure what I wrote about would continue to be relatable.

Lieber has identified that the novel is an allegorical story with hidden levels of meaning for readers who want to dig deeper into the narrative. Two important allegories Lieber drew inspiration from while writing The War Hero were William Golding's Lord of the Flies and George Orwell's Animal Farm.

== Bibliography ==
=== Novels ===
- 2018 – The War Hero (1-5272-3346-4)
- 2021 – The Boy and the Goldlock (1-9196-1620-9)
- 2022 – Helga Dune (1-9196-1623-3)

=== Short stories ===
- 2020 – Elle's Logic (features in The Boy and the Goldlock (1-8382-1870-X)

=== Essays and non-fiction ===
- 2022 – The London Riots of 2011: An Eyewitness Account (1-9196-1626-8)
- 2024 - Finding The Christmas Spirit And Other Essays (essay collection, 1-9196-1629-2)
  - "Finding The Christmas Spirit"
  - "The great British Sunday roast"
  - "Lieber on Shakespeare"
  - "The Heart of Britannia"
  - "The London Riots of 2011"
