= 9 Dead Gay Guys =

- DVD Cover
- Directed by: Lab Ky Mo
- Written by: Lab Ky Mo
- Produced by: Andrew Melmore
- Starring: Brendan Mackey; Glen Mulhern
- Narrated by: Brendan Mackey
- Cinematography: Damien Elliott
- Edited by: Chris Blunden
- Music by: Resident Filters; Stephen W. Parsons
- Distributed by: TLA Releasing
- Release dates: 18 October 2002 (Bergen International Film Festival); 19 September 2003
- Running time: 83 minutes
- Country: United Kingdom
- Language: English
- Box office: $26,377

9 Dead Gay Guys is a 2002 British comedy film directed by Lab Ky Mo and starring Brendan Mackey and Glen Mulhern and released by TLA Releasing.

== Plot ==
Two lads from Belfast stumble their way through the London gay underworld in search of "gainful employment," the offering of sexual favours to older gay men in order to subsidize their respective giros. However, when one of the lads accidentally shags a punter to death, they are forced to look for 'work' elsewhere. It is then that they discover the myth of 'The Bread in the Bed' - a huge bed full of money. Nine dead gay guys are the result of the ensuing caper as the lads begin the search for the bed.

== Cast ==
- Glen Mulhern as Kenny
- Brendan Mackey as Byron
- Steven Berkoff as Jeff
- Michael Praed as The Queen
- Vas Blackwood as Donkey-Dick Dark
- Fish as Old Nick
- Carol Decker as Jeff's Wife
- Simon Godley as Golders Green
- Leon Herbert as Nev
- Raymond Griffiths as The Desperate Dwarf
- Abdala Keserwani as Dick-Cheese Deepak
- Karen Sharman as The Iron Lady
- Carl Merchant as The Waiter
- Steven Woodhouse as Father Ted

== Reception ==
The film was first shown at the Cannes Film Festival in 2002. It created such a storm that the film quickly sold out and people had to be turned away at the box office, so the film was given extra viewings to accommodate the demand. During screenings people's reaction to the film was extreme: either they loved it or walked out in disgust. Critical reception of 9 Dead Gay Guys was very negative, earning a Rotten Tomatoes score of 18 out of 100, based upon 22 aggregate reviews. However Dave Kehr wrote for The New York Times that "the film strains mightily to be flashy and hip but finishes more in the realm of the merely distasteful," though Andy Klein of Variety stated "9 Dead Gay Guys, a dark comedy in the John Waters tradition, takes place in such a cartoonish, good-natured universe it's hard to imagine anyone taking offence."

Due to the film's seemingly controversial subject matter the film could only secure a limited release, and subsequently made only $26,377 at the box office. In the film's initial sole theater, the film grossed $3,462 in the opening week.

The film won two major awards. The first was the 2002 'Audience Award' for 'Best Feature Film at the Dublin Gay and Lesbian film festival. The second award was the 'Festival Prize' at the Montreal 'Just For Laughs' comedy film festival.
