= From Bedrooms to Billions =

- Theatrical release poster
- Directed by: Anthony Caulfield; Nicola Caulfield
- Starring: Peter Molyneux; Ian Livingstone; Matthew Smith; David Braben; David Darling; David Perry; Jeff Minter; Simon Nicol; Chris Anderson; Mel Croucher; Jon Hare
- Music by: Rob Hubbard; Ben Daglish; Stewart Dugdale: Max Hall; the British IBM
- Release date: 3 October 2014
- Running time: 124 minutes
- Country: United Kingdom
- Language: English

From Bedrooms to Billions is a 2014 documentary film by British filmmakers Anthony and Nicola Caulfield that tells the story of the British video games industry from 1979 to the present day. The film focuses on how the creativity and vision of a relatively small number of individuals allowed the UK to play a key, pioneering role in the shaping of the billion dollar video games industry which today dominates the modern world's entertainment landscape. The film features interviews with major British game designers, journalists and musicians from across the last 30 years.

The filmmakers originally conceived of the project as a three-part television series, but were unable to garner interest from either the BBC or Channel 4, both of which considered the project "too niche." So the team, inspired by earlier success with their 2010 film Burlesque Undressed, turned instead to crowd funding.

The Caulfields raised approximately £80,000 through two rounds of crowd funding with Indiegogo and Kickstarter generating donations of $37,000 and £60,000 respectively. Further funds have been raised through direct donations, pre-orders for DVDs and soundtrack CDs via the From Bedrooms To Billions website which has allowed them to produce the film independently.

From Bedrooms to Billions was originally scheduled for release on 30 May 2014. The digital version was eventually launched on 3 October 2014. with DVD & Blu-ray versions released in March 2015.

In an interview in early 2019, it was revealed that Black Mirror creator Charlie Brooker had given the stars of Bandersnatch, an interactive episode of the Black Mirror series, a copy of Bedrooms to Billions to help prepare them for the roles, and to give them inspiration.

The makers of the documentary made two further films bearing the From Bedrooms to Billions name: The Amiga Years (2016) and The PlayStation Revolution (2020).
