= Up Holland High School =

Coordinates: 53.529°N 2.719°W

Location
- Sandbrook Road; Up Holland, Lancashire, WN5 7AL; England

Information
- Type: Academy
- Motto: Dedicated to Excellence
- Established: 1960
- Sister school: Rainford High School
- Local authority: Lancashire
- Trust: Everyone Matters Schools Trust
- Department for Education URN: 149983 Tables
- Ofsted: Reports
- Headteacher: Paul Scarborough
- Gender: Coeducational
- Age: 11 to 16
- Website: https://uhhs.uk/

Up Holland High School is a coeducational secondary school located in Up Holland, Lancashire, England. It is a non-denominational comprehensive school.

== History ==
A recommendation for construction of the school was made in 1958, with an expected cost of over £110,000. The cost was higher than a previous estimate due to additional work needed on the foundations following ground testing. The new school officially opened as Up Holland County Secondary School in September 1960, with an intake of 462 students. For about four years prior to opening, the school had been temporarily based in adapted buildings of the former Up Holland Grammar School, next to where the new school was being constructed. After the old school burned down they adapted the school logo of a blue phoenix.

In 1977, the school was renamed from Up Holland Secondary Modern School to Up Holland High School.

On 24 March 2023, the school announced that it was intending to become an academy converter and join the Everyone Matters Schools Trust. In December 2023, the school announced that these plans had been approved by the board of governors and Up Holland High School joined the trust on the 1 January 2024. Prior to academisation, Up Holland High School was a community school administered by Lancashire County Council.

== Notable former pupils ==
- Catherine Ashton, Baroness Ashton, politician
- Richard Ashcroft of The Verve.
- Laura Barton, journalist
- Harry Coppell, pole vaulter.
- David Grindley, sprinter
- Leon Osman, midfielder for Everton Football Club as well as the two caps for the England national football team.

== Notable former teachers ==
- Stuart Cummings MBE, former head of match officials for the Rugby Football League

== See also ==
- Listed buildings in Up Holland
