= Maple Hayes =

Country house in Burntwood, Staffordshire, England

Coordinates: 52.684°N 1.8583°W

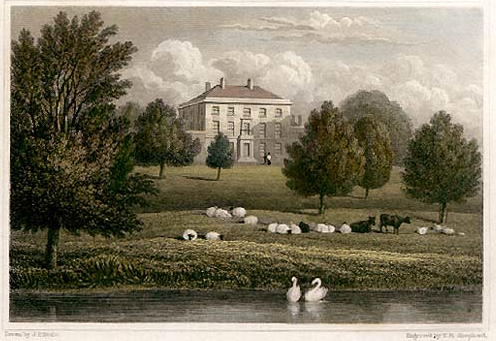
Maple Hayes c.1830

Maple Hayes is late 18th century manor house, now occupied by a special education school, near Lichfield, Staffordshire. It is a Grade II listed building.

In 1728 a farmhouse stood at Maple Hayes. When the owner William Jesson died in 1732 the estate was shared by his daughters. In 1786 his great nephew sold the estate to George Addams a wine merchant of Lichfield.

Addams built a new manor house on the site in 1794. In a plain Georgian style the house was of three storeys, five bays and a central porched entrance, and with single-storey wings.

Addams sold in 1804 to John Atkinson (High Sheriff of Staffordshire in 1828) and thereafter the house had a series of owners and tenants including Sir Thomas Fremantle Bt, his brother in law Sir James Fitzgerald Bt, and from 1851 Samuel Pole Shawe (High Sheriff in 1855). In 1884 Henry Cunliffe Shawe sold the house and 450 acres (1.8 km^{2}) of the estate to Albert Octavius Worthington ( High Sheriff in 1889) of the Burton on Trent brewery company Worthington & Co.

Worthington extended the estate and enlarged and improved the house about 1884. The wings were raised to two storeys and bay windows added, and new a southern wing and a northern service wing were created.

The estate was broken up and sold in 1950. In 1951 the house was acquired by Staffordshire County Council as a boarding facility for King Edward VI School (Lichfield). In 1981 it was sold to become, and remains occupied by, the Maple Hayes School for Dyslexics.

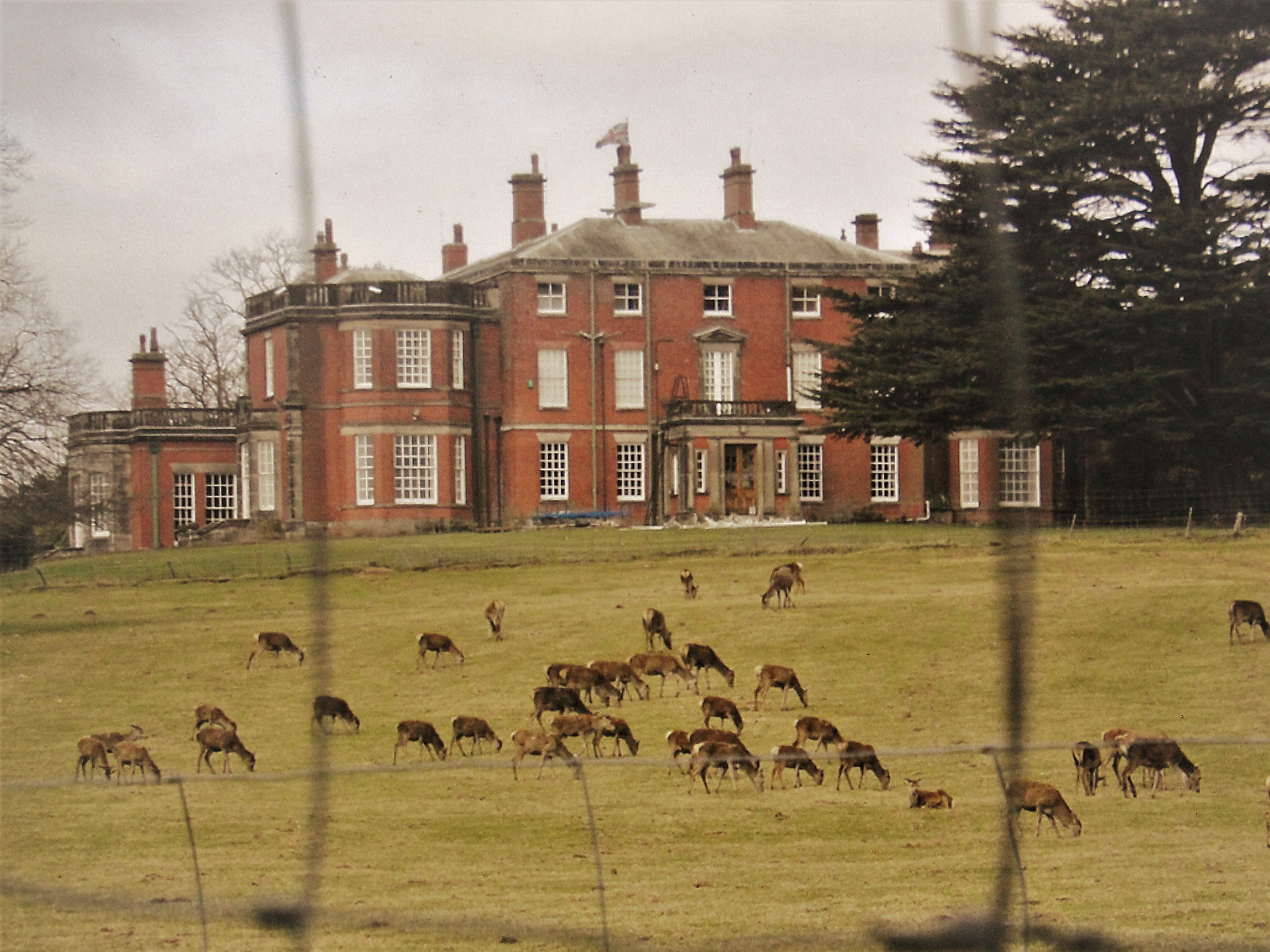
Maple Hayes School for Dyslexics (2018).

== Literature ==
The English novel The War Hero was dedicated to the schools proprietors, doctors Neville and Daryl Brown.

== See also ==
- Listed buildings in Burntwood
