= Stuart Cummings =

English rugby league referee (born 1960)

Personal information
- Born: 17 November 1960 (age 65) Whitehaven

Refereeing information
Years	Competition	Apps
1995–2000	World Cup	7
1996–1999	Other Internationals	3
1991–2002	Championship/Super League
1991–2002	Challenge Cup

Stuart Cummings
Cricket information
- Batting: Right-handed
- Role: Wicketkeeper

Domestic team information
- Years: Team
- 1987–1987: Cheshire

Career statistics
Competition	List A
Matches	2
Runs scored	1
Batting average	1.00
100s/50s	0/0
Top score	1*
Catches/stumpings	0/–
- Source: Cricinfo, 30 April 2025

Stuart Cummings MBE (born 17 November 1960) is the former Match Officials Director of the Rugby Football League, and a former international referee.

== Career ==
He played wicketkeeper for Cheshire County Cricket Club in the 1986 and 1987 seasons.

He qualified as a rugby league referee in 1988 and was awarded senior referee status in 1991. In his refereeing career, he took charge of over 400 first-grade games, including 4 Challenge Cup finals, 2 World Cup finals and 2 Grand Finals.

In 1998 he suffered bruised ribs at the end of a Challenge Cup semi-final during a crowd invasion.

He was the former Rugby Football League Match Officials Director. In this position, he fielded questions from fans about refereeing decisions and explained the laws behind disputed or controversial decisions. His job also included appointing senior officials to matches and reviewing their performances. During his tenure he oversaw the transition to full-time referees in the Super League.

He was also regularly featured on Rugby League live broadcasts to provide expert opinion.

Cummings was appointed Member of the Order of the British Empire (MBE) in the 2014 New Year Honours for services to Rugby League.

In 2014 he was hired by the England and Wales Cricket Board to work with its umpiring panel for the summer after stepping down from his position with the RFL and was appointed as a cricket liaison officer by the ECB in 2015.

In June 2016 he joined the RFL's new Match Officials' Standards Panel.

== Personal life ==
Prior to being the Match Officials Director, Cummings was a physical education teacher at Up Holland High School, near Wigan; refereeing weekends until taking up his position with the Rugby Football League full-time in 2000.
