= Church of St Thomas the Martyr, Up Holland =

Coordinates: 53.5405°N 2.7211°W

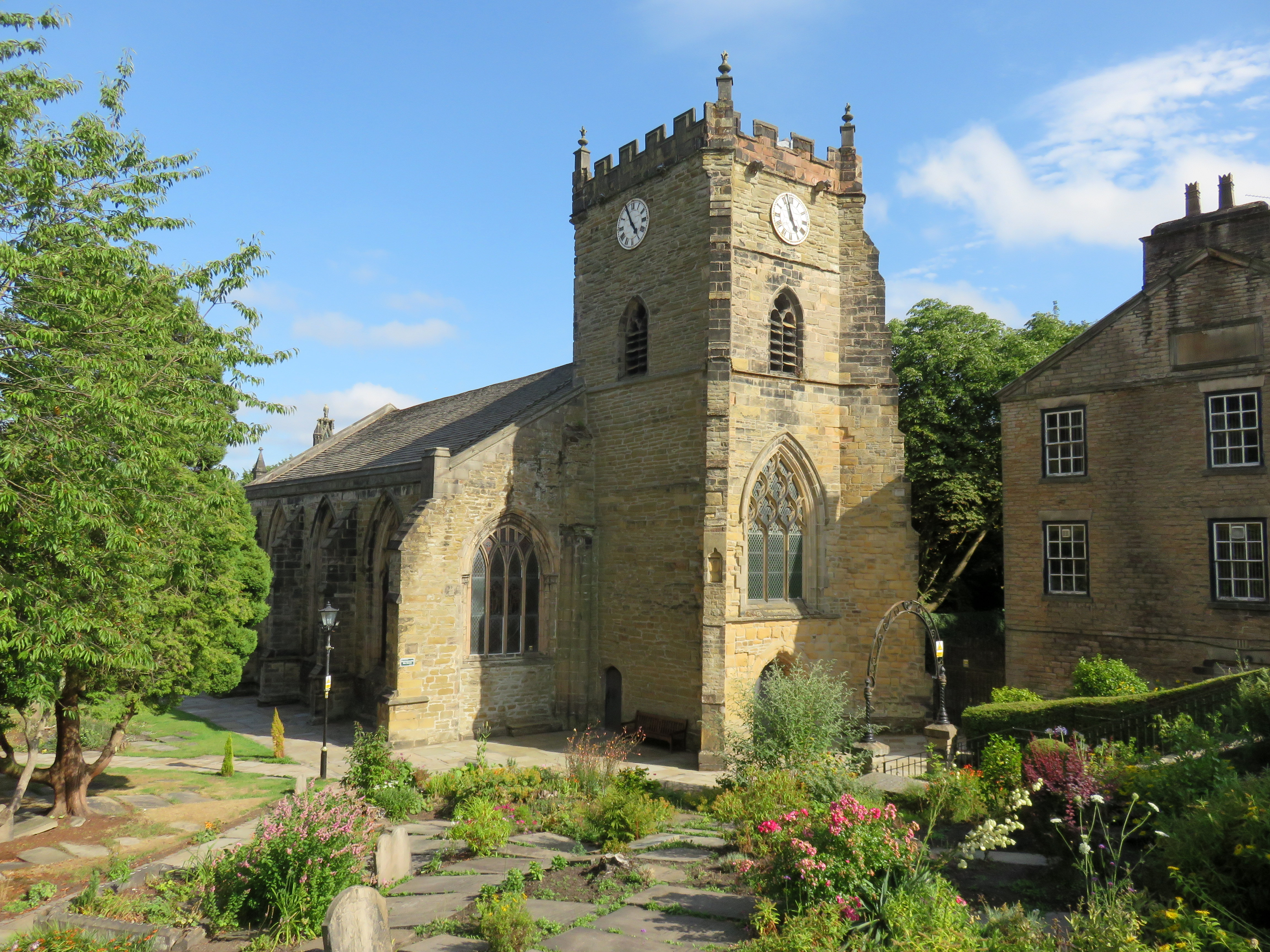
- Church of St Thomas the Martyr

- Location in West Lancashire
- OS grid reference: SD 523 051
- Location: School Lane, Up Holland, Lancashire
- Country: England
- Denomination: Anglican
- Churchmanship: Modern Catholic
- Website: St Thomas the Martyr, Up Holland

History
- Status: Parish church
- Founded: 1307
- Founder: Robert de Holland
- Dedication: Saint Thomas the Martyr

Architecture
- Functional status: Active
- Heritage designation: Grade I
- Designated: 7 January 1952
- Architect(s): Basil Champneys (restoration and addition of the chancel)
- Architectural type: Church
- Style: Gothic, Gothic Revival
- Groundbreaking: 1307
- Completed: 1886

Specifications
- Materials: Stone, slate roofs

Administration
- Diocese: Diocese of Liverpool
- Archdeaconry: Warrington
- Deanery: Ormskirk
- Parish: Up Holland

Clergy
- Priest: Paul Lock

The Church of St Thomas the Martyr is in School Lane, Up Holland, Lancashire, England. It is an active Anglican parish church in the deanery of Ormskirk, the archdeaconry of Warrington, and the diocese of Liverpool. The church is recorded in the National Heritage List for England as a designated Grade I listed building.

== History ==
The building was founded in 1307 as a college for a dean and twelve secular priests by Robert de Holland, who was secretary to Thomas Plantagenet, Earl of Lancaster. However, in 1319 the college was converted into a priory by Walter Langton, Bishop of Lichfield, because of charges of misbehaviour by the priests. Up Holland Priory was part of the Benedictine order, and was the last foundation of that order in England. The priory was closed in 1536 during the Dissolution of the Monasteries, but part of its church continued in use for worship. A tower had been added during the 15th century, and the chancel became what is the nave of the present church. The interior of the church was reordered in 1772, when galleries and box pews were installed, and a plaster ceiling was added. Up Holland became a separate parish in 1882, with St Thomas' as its parish church. The aisles were restored during the 19th century. In 1882–86 the chancel was added by Basil Champneys, with a crypt beneath it acting as a vestry. Champneys also removed the galleries.

== Architecture ==
=== Exterior ===
The church is constructed in stone, with slate roofs. Its plan consists of a four-bay nave with north and south aisles, a two-bay chancel with a crypt beneath, a polygonal stair turret leading to the crypt, and a west tower. The tower is in four stages, with diagonal stepped buttresses. It has a west doorway carved with masks, shields, figures and Tudor roses. Above this is a large three-light window containing reticulated tracery. The two-light bell openings contain louvres, and above them is a small top stage containing clock faces. The parapet is embattled with pinnacles at the corners. Along the sides of the aisles and at their east ends are 19th-century windows with reticulated tracery. The chancel has two-light windows on its sides, and a large five-light east window.

=== Interior ===
Inside the church the arcades are carried on quatrefoil piers. In each aisle are two painted hatchments. The south aisle contains a Commandment board and two benediction lists, and the north aisle has the Royal arms of George I. At the west end of the nave is a churchwardens' pew dated 1679, and in the base of the tower is a churchwardens' cupboard dated 1720. Also in the south aisle is a piscina with a double basin. There are fragments of medieval stained glass in a south window. The windows in the chancel were designed by Henry Holiday in 1884 and 1903–04.

== External features ==
The limited remains of the rest of the priory are situated to the south of the church. They have been designated at Grade II, and are a scheduled monument. The churchyard contains the war graves of five soldiers of World War I, and two soldiers and an airman of World War II.

== See also ==
- Grade I listed buildings in Lancashire
- Grade I listed churches in Lancashire
- Listed buildings in Up Holland
