= Up Holland Priory =

Coordinates: 53.5401°N 2.7213°W

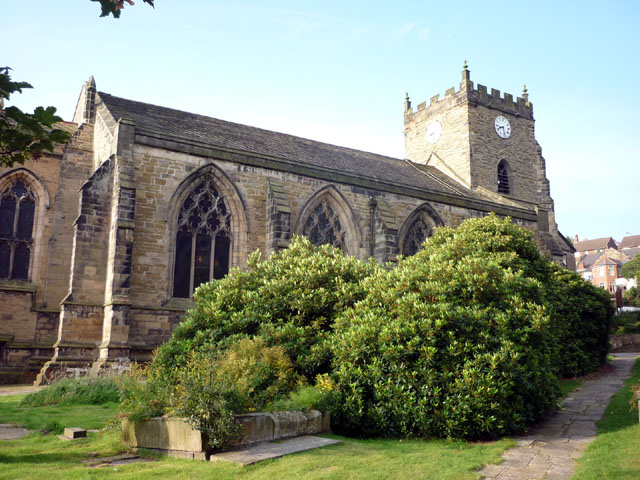
- St Thomas the Martyr's nave used to be the chancel of the priory.

- Location in West Lancashire
- Location: Up Holland, Lancashire
- Denomination: Benedictine

History
- Founded: 1319

Architecture
- Heritage designation: Grade II

Up Holland Priory was a Benedictine priory in Up Holland, Lancashire, England. It was founded in 1319. The priory remains are recorded in the National Heritage List for England as a designated Grade II listed building, and the site is listed as a scheduled monument. The former chancel is now the nave of the Church of St Thomas the Martyr.

== See also ==
- Scheduled monuments in Lancashire
- Listed buildings in Up Holland
- List of English abbeys, priories and friaries serving as parish churches
