= Listed buildings in Up Holland =

Up Holland is a civil parish in the West Lancashire district of Lancashire, England. It contains 97 buildings that are recorded in the National Heritage List for England as designated listed buildings. Of these, one is listed at Grade I, the highest of the three grades, four are at Grade II*, the middle grade, and the others are at Grade II, the lowest grade. The parish contains the village of Up Holland and surrounding countryside. The oldest surviving structure in the parish is Up Holland Priory, the chancel of which was converted into the nave of the Church of St Thomas the Martyr; both of these are listed. Most of the other listed buildings are houses, cottages and associated structures, and buildings that are (or originated as) farmhouses and farm buildings. The Liverpool and Bury Railway Company built a railway through the parish and, associated with this and listed, are two bridges and two tunnel portals. The other listed buildings include public houses, more churches, a former windmill, schools and colleges, a war memorial and a telephone kiosk.

== Key ==
Grade	Criteria
I	Buildings of exceptional interest, sometimes considered to be internationally important
II*	Particularly important buildings of more than special interest
II	Buildings of national importance and special interest

== Buildings ==
Name and location	Photograph	Date	Notes	Grade
Up Holland Priory remains 53.54019°N 2.72116°W	—	1319	The remains are in sandstone blocks forming an L-shaped plan. These include a west wall and an east return that contain parts of two arched doorways with chamfered surrounds. The remains are also a scheduled monument.	II
Church of St Thomas the Martyr; 53.54042°N 2.72105°W		Early 14th century	The nave of the church was originally the chancel of Up Holland Priory. The west tower dates from the 15th century, and the chancel with a crypt (which acts as a vestry), by Basil Champneys, was added in 1882–86. The church is built in stone with slate roofs. The tower has four stages, and has a west doorway with decorative moulding, a three-light west window, two-light bell openings, a stage with clock faces and a band with grotesques, and an embattled parapet with corner pinnacles.	I
Lower Tower Hill Farmhouse; 53.53819°N 2.73016°W	—	Early 17th century or earlier (probable)	A wing was added to the former farmhouse in 1684, and there have been subsequent alterations. The house is in sandstone with quoins and stone-slate roofs. There are two storeys and an L-shaped plan, with a main two-bay range, a two-bay cross wing to the left, and an outshut at the rear. The doorway has a chamfered surround and a Tudor arched head. Many of the windows are mullioned, but some have been replaced by sliding sash windows or 20th-century casements. The gable wall of the wing contains a datestone, and on the apex is a finial.	II
Barn, Lower Tower Hill Farm; 53.53802°N 2.72981°W	—	Early 17th century or earlier (probable)	The barn and shippon are in sandstone with a stone-slate roof. They are in a U-shaped plan, with a three-bay range, a wing, and an outshut. They contain a wagon entrance, doorways and a loading door. Inside are two cruck trusses. (Note: Street View in March 2009 shows the barn to be in a dilapidated condition.)	II
29 and 31 School Lane; 53.54088°N 2.71999°W	—	Early 17th century (probable)	A pair of houses, possibly originally one dwelling consisting of a main range (No. 29) and a cross wing (No. 31) to the right. Both parts have two storeys, No. 29 is in brick with a composition tile roof, and No. 31 is in sandstone, with quoins and a stone-slate roof. No. 29 has a plain doorway and windows with altered glazing. No. 31 has a central doorway, two casement windows in the ground floor, and one window containing a sliding sash in the upper floor. On the side of No. 31 is a brick lean-to extension, and inside the house is a timber-framed partition.	II
Old Bounty Farm; 53.52268°N 2.74517°W		1667	The farmhouse was later extended. It is basically cruck- and timber-framed, and was later encased in sandstone and it has a stone-slate roof. There are two storeys, a main two-bay range, a taller wing to the left, and a wing at the rear. On the front, the main range has a doorway and two windows in each floor, and in the wing there is one window in each floor. Inside the house is an inglenook and a bressumer.	II
Dean House Farmhouse; 53.55028°N 2.71702°W	—	Early 17th century (probable)	The former farmhouse is in sandstone with a stone-slate roof, in two storeys and four bays. On the front is a doorway and casement windows; elsewhere the windows are mullioned. In the north gable wall is a carved stone plaque, and inside the house is an inglenook and a bressumer.	II
Lancashire Lodge; 53.53073°N 2.74119°W		Early 17th century	Originally a farmhouse, later incorporated into a hotel, it is in sandstone with quoins and a slate roof. There are two storeys, and the building has a T-shaped plan, with a one-bay range, a two-bay cross wing at the east, and a later projecting wing at the west. In the angle of the west wing is a gabled porch with a Tudor arched lintel. The windows were mullioned but some mullions have been lost.	II
Old Grammar School; 53.54087°N 2.71848°W	—	Early 17th century	The school has been altered and used subsequently as a workshop. It is in sandstone and has a 20th-century pantile roof. It has two storeys and a T-shaped plan, with a main range and a projecting two-storey gabled porch and stair turret to the south. The porch has a Tudor arched doorway (later converted into a window) with a chamfered surround and a massive lintel. The windows are mullioned, and some have been altered or replaced.	II*
The Owl Inn; 53.54090°N 2.72048°W	—	Early 17th century (probable)	A public house, basically timber-framed, with sandstone cladding and a slate roof. It has two storeys and two bays with later additions. On the front facing the road is a blocked doorway with voussoirs and a keystone. The ground floor windows are casements with wedge lintels, and the upper floor has sash windows. There is exposed timber-framing in the left gable wall.	II
Derby House; 53.54093°N 2.72079°W	—	1647	Formerly the Old Manor Court House, it is in sandstone with quoins and a slate roof. The building is at right angles to the road and has a gabled front of two storeys with a basement and an attic. In the basement is a blocked doorway with a Tudor arched lintel, a blocked opening to the left, and a doorway to the right. The ground floor contains a window with altered glazing, and in the top floor is a six-light mullioned window. The gable contains a carved stone plaque. At the rear is another mullioned window and another carved stone plaque.	II
Johnson's Farmhouse; 53.55686°N 2.72209°W		1647	The farmhouse is roughcast with a composition tile roof. It has an H-shaped plan, with a single-storey one-bay range, with two two-storey cross wings. In the right wing is an integral porch with a Tudor arched doorway, above which is a datestone. The windows in the right wing are mullioned, in the central range is a modern casement window, and the left wing has altered windows. Inside the house are an inglenook and a bressumer.	II*
Holland Hall Hotel; 53.54653°N 2.71962°W	—	1654	The original house has been obscured by 20th-century hotel additions. It has a U-shaped plan, and was re-modelled in the 18th century. There is a pedimented doorway with a moulded architrave flanked by sash windows.	II
Barn, Johnson's Farm; 53.55682°N 2.72175°W	—	1664	Attached to the barn are shippons and a cart shed. They are in sandstone with some brick, and have roofs of slate and stone-slate. The barn has a full-height wagon entrance, a window, a doorway, a datestone, and a lean-to outshut on the left. To the right is a single-storey four-bay shippon and cart shed, and there are 20th-century extension to the rear.	II
Barn, Old Bounty Farm; 53.52257°N 2.74521°W	—	Late 17th century (probable)	The barn, with attached shippon and stable, is in sandstone with a stone-slate roof. It is in three bays and contains a full height wagon doorway and ventilation slits. At the rear are a shippon and a stable, both with catslide roofs that form a porch for a rear wagon entrance.	II
Moss Farmhouse; 53.54100°N 2.74541°W	—	Late 17th century	The former farmhouse is in sandstone with a plinth, quoins and a slate roof, and has two storeys. It has a one-bay, a rear wing, and a two-bay cross wing on the right. In the main range is a doorway with a plain surround. Most of the windows are mullioned, and at the rear is a stair window. Inside the main range is an inglenook and a bressumer.	II
4 and 6 School Lane; 53.54048°N 2.71804°W	—	Late 17th or early 18th century	A pair of cottages in sandstone with some brick and a stone-slate roof. There are two storeys, a front of three bays, and extensions at the rear. There is a porch on the front, and another on the right gable wall, and most of the windows are casements. In one of the rear extensions is a mullioned window.	II
Ambrose Cottage; 53.52173°N 2.74583°W	—	Late 17th or early 18th century (probable)	Originally a farmhouse and barn, later converted into one dwelling. It is in sandstone with a slate roof, and is in two storeys. There is a two-bay main range with a projecting wing to the left, and the former barn at the left. The doorway has been altered, and the windows are 20th-century casements. The former barn has a doorway and a French window.	II
College Farmhouse; 53.55097°N 2.73384°W	—	Late 17th or early 18th century (probable)	The farmhouse was enlarged and altered later in the 18th century and again in the 19th century. It is in sandstone with slate roofs, and has an irregular rectangular plan consisting of three parallel gabled ranges. On the west front is a gabled two-storey porch that has a square-headed doorway with a rectangular lintel and a square window. Elsewhere some of the windows are mullioned and others contain altered glazing.	II
High Walthew Green Farmhouse; 53.56005°N 2.72198°W	—	Late 17th or early 18th century	A former farmhouse, later used for other purposes, it is in sandstone with a slate roof and has two storeys. The building has an L-shaped plan with a main three-bay range, a rear wing, and an outshut. Most of the windows are casements, some are sliding sashes, and others have been altered. At the front is a lean-to porch with a stone-slate roof, and along the rear is a 20th-century glazed external corridor.	II
Newgate Farmhouse; 53.54147°N 2.74242°W	—	1707	The former farmhouse is in sandstone with a chamfered plinth, quoins, and a reconstituted stone tile roof. It has two storeys and an attic, and a one-bay range, a rear wing, a projecting cross wing to the right, and an addition in the rear angle. The gabled porch is in two storeys and has a round-headed doorway with moulded jambs and moulded imposts. Above the doorway is a datestone, a window, and an oculus in the apex. Almost all the windows are mullioned, with one casement window at the rear. Inside the house is an inglenook and a bressumer.	II*
Knights House; 53.56118°N 2.73028°W	—	1716	The house contains earlier fabric. It is in sandstone with concrete tile roofs, and has two storeys. There is a three-bay section, slightly protruding, and flanking two-bay wings added in the 19th century. The doorway has a chamfered surround and a keystone, and above it is a datestone. The windows in the ground floor of the central section are top-hung casements resembling sashes, and the windows in the upper floor and in the wings are all sashes. At the rear are mullioned windows and a stair window, and inside the house is a timber-framed partition.	II
Manor House; 53.52231°N 2.75442°W	—	1718	The house has an exterior of limestone, cross walls of brick, and a stone-slate roof. It has 2 1/2 storeys and a symmetrical front of five bays with channelled pilasters framing the porch and at the corners of the house. In the centre is a full height gabled porch with a round-headed external arch and moulded imposts, and the inner doorway has a semicircular fanlight. The windows are mullioned and transomed with architraves and keystones. In the outer bays are gabled dormers.	II*
Gate piers, Manor House; 53.52203°N 2.75427°W	—	c. 1718	The gate piers are in sandstone, and in Neoclassical style. Each pier has a square plan with sides of about 0.5 metres (1 ft 8 in) and are about 3 metres (9.8 ft) high. The sides are panelled, and at the corners are fluted Doric quarter-columns. There is also a frieze with a triglyph on each side, a moulded cornice, and a pedestal for a ball finial.	II
3 Roby Mill; 53.55898°N 2.72948°W	—	1725	A sandstone hose with a composition tile roof, it has two storeys at the front and one at the rear. There are two bays, a doorway with a rectangular lintel and sliding sash windows. In the upper floor is a datestone.	II
47–53 Parliament Street; 53.54260°N 2.72345°W	—	Early 18th century (probable)	A row of four sandstone cottages with stone-slate roofs. Nos. 47 and 49 are three storeys, the others have two storeys. All the doorways are to the left. Nos. 47 and 49 have mullioned windows and gabled dormers, and the others have casement windows.	II
Gate piers, Knights House; 53.56096°N 2.72993°W	—	Early 18th century (probable)	The pair of gate piers is at the entrance of the drive to the house. They are in sandstone and in Classical style. Each pier is about 0.5 metres (1 ft 8 in) square and 3 metres (9.8 ft) high, and has a moulded plinth, a moulded cornice, and an urn finial with gadrooning.	II
Barn and shippon, Lower Pimbo Farm; 53.52665°N 2.73996°W	—	Early to mid 18th century	The barn and shippon are in sandstone and have an asbestos sheet roof. They have an L-shaped plan, with a three-bay shippon, an additional bay added to the west, a two-bay barn at right angles to the rear, and an outshut at the east end. The shippon has two storeys, and contains doorways, and external steps leading to first floor loading doors. The barn has a wagon entrance and a doorway with a porch.	II
Tan Pit Cottages; 53.56353°N 2.72448°W	—	Early to mid 18th century	A row of cottages, originally eight, later converted into six dwellings. They are in sandstone with a composition tile roof, in two storeys, and each original cottage has one bay. Each cottage has a doorway to the left and one window in each floor. Some cottages have later porches, and most of the glazing has been altered.	II
182 and 184 Ormskirk Road; 53.54042°N 2.74578°W	—	Mid 18th century (probable)	A pair of cottages, later combined into a single dwelling, in sandstone with a stone-slate roof. There are two storeys and two bays. The doorway is at the left end and it has a thin lintel; the other doorway has been blocked. The windows are casements.	II
2, 2A and 4 Stoney Brow	—	Mid 18th century	Originally a row of cottages, some of which were back-to-back, later converted into three dwellings in sandstone with composition tile roofs. The main range has two storeys and an attic with, on the front, a doorway, a bow window, a sliding sash window, and casement windows. In the right gable wall is a porch and attic windows, and on the left is a lean-to addition with 1 1/2 storeys, a doorway and casement windows.	II
Alma Hill Farmhouse and Cottage; 53.54138°N 2.72391°W	—	Mid 18th century	Originally a farmhouse with a workshop at the rear, later converted into a house and a cottage. The building is in sandstone with composition tile roofs. The house has two storeys, cellars and attics, quoins, and a symmetrical three-bay front. The central doorway has fluted pilasters and a fanlight. The windows are top-hung casements imitating sashes. The cottage has two storeys and altered windows.	II
Two cottages, Johnson's Farm; 53.55685°N 2.72257°W	—	18th century	A pair of cottages with a composition tile roof, they have two storeys and three bays. The square-headed doorways have plain surrounds, and the windows are casements. There are 20th-century extensions at the rear.	II
Pair of gate piers, Lancashire Lodge; 53.53110°N 2.74279°W	—	18th century	The gate piers are in sandstone, and in Classical style. Each pier has a square section, it is rusticated, and is about 4 metres (13 ft) high. It has a moulded base, pedestal and cap, and is surmounted by a large ball finial.	II
Lower Pimbo Farmhouse and wall 53.52699°N 2.74001°W	—	18th century	A sandstone farmhouse, partly pebbledashed and partly rendered with a slate roof. There are two storeys with cellars, and a three-bay front. The doorway has a wooden surround, and the windows have cement surrounds and contain 20th-century casements. At the rear is a stair window with 20th-century stained glass. The wall enclosing the garden is in sandstone, it is about 1 metre (3 ft 3 in) high, with flat coping and ball finials flanking a plain gateway.	II
Priory House; 53.54006°N 2.72102°W	—	Mid 18th century	Probably an extension of an earlier house, it is in sandstone with a stone-slate roof. The house has two storeys with attics, and five bays with lateral service wings. The central doorway has fluted pilasters, a triglyph frieze, and a cornice, and the windows are sashes.	II
Rothwell House; 53.54708°N 2.72097°W	—	Mid 18th century	The former farmhouse is in brick on a sandstone plinth with a slate roof. It has two storeys and two bays. The doorway has a segmental-arched head with a keystone, and most of the windows are sliding sashes.	II
Mill House; 53.54613°N 2.73659°W	—	c. 1760	Originally the house of a mill owner, later a private house, it is in sandstone with a stone-slate roof. The house has two storeys, and an L-shaped plan, with a main range and a rear wing. It has a 20th-century glazed porch, and most of the windows are casements.	II
Windmill; 53.54592°N 2.73707°W		1761	A tower windmill, it is in sandstone and has a cylindrical plan. Three stages and a basement remain. There are four doorways each with a flat-arched head, voussoirs and a raised keystone. In the upper stages are small rectangular windows.	II
38, 40 and 42 Roby Mill; 53.56053°N 2.72967°W	—	Mid to late 18th century	A row of three sandstone cottages with a composition tile roof, in two storeys. Each cottage has one bay, a door to the left with a rectangular lintel, and two windows. No. 38 has a sliding sash window and a casement window, No. 40 has altered glazing, and No. 42 has two casement windows.	II
3–13 Walthew Green; 53.56039°N 2.72108°W		Mid to late 18th century	A row of six sandstone cottages with a composition tile roof. They have two storeys, and each cottage has one bay. The paired doorways have square heads, and 20th-century lean-to porches with stone-slate roofs. The windows are casements with thin lintels.	II
29–41 Dingle Road; 53.54281°N 2.72669°W	—	Late 18th century	A row of seven sandstone cottages with roofs mainly of reconstituted stone-slate. They have two storeys, and each cottage has one bay. Most of the doorways have simple rectangular lintels, and most of the windows have altered glazing.	II
65 and 67 Ormskirk Road; 53.54106°N 2.73154°W	—	Late 18th century	A house and a cottage with a former stable between them in one row. They are in sandstone with stone-slate roofs in two levels, and have two storeys. The house has two bays, a central round-headed doorway with imposts, a keystone and a fanlight. The windows are sashes with raised sills and wedge lintels. The cottage to the left has a plain doorway and casement windows. (Note: Street View in May 2009 shows that the former stable has been converted for domestic use.)	II
180 Ormskirk Road; 53.54033°N 2.74555°W	—	Late 18th century	A sandstone house with a stone-slate roof, in two storeys and with two bays. It has a doorway with a surround of rusticated quoins. The windows on the front contain 20th-century glazing, those in the ground floor with wedge lintels. In the left gable wall are casement windows.	II
9 and 11 Roby Mill; 53.55916°N 2.72962°W	—	Late 18th century (probable)	A pair of sandstone cottages with a composition tile roof. There are two storeys and each cottage has one bay. Both cottages have 20th-century wooden glazed porches, and the windows are casements.	II
18 and 20 Roby Mill; 53.55848°N 2.72907°W	—	Late 18th century (probable)	A pair of cottages later incorporated into the Fox Inn. They are in sandstone with a stone-slate roof, in two storeys, and each cottage has one bay. The doorways are to the left, with thin rectangular lintels, and the windows are casements.	II
57 and 59 School Lane; 53.54092°N 2.72105°W	—	Late 18th century (probable)	Originally a pair of houses, with No. 59 later used as a shop. They are in sandstone with quoins, and a roof partly of slate and partly of composition tiles. They have three storeys, No. 57 has one bay and No. 59 has two. In the ground floor of No. 57 is a doorway with a plain surround approached by four steps and one window. In the ground floor of No. 59 is a shop front and a doorway with a fanlight to the right. The windows have altered glazing. The ground floor window of No. 57, the doorway of No. 59 and the first floor windows have wedge lintels imitating voussoirs and raised keystones.	II
8 and 10 Tithebarn Street; 53.54229°N 2.72700°W	—	Late 18th century	A pair of sandstone cottages with a slate roof, in two storeys and with a symmetrical front. Each cottage has one bay, and this contains a doorway with a thin rectangular lintel. The windows are casements, and at the rear is a 20th-century flat-roofed extension.	II
29 and 31 Tontine Road; 53.53433°N 2.71835°W	—	Late 18th century	Originally a pair of cottages, later combined into one dwelling. It is in sandstone with a stone-slate roof, and has two storeys and two bays. The doorways, on the right of each bay, have plain surrounds. No. 29 has a square window in each floor, there is a casement window in the ground floor of No. 31, a square window above, and an inserted window over the door.	II
Coach House and Rock House; 53.54244°N 2.72333°W	—	Late 18th century (probable)	A rendered house in two portions, with stone-slate roofs, and with two storeys and basements. The left part is set back, and both parts have two bays. The doorway is between the two parts, it is approached by steps, and has a terrace with wrought iron railings. The windows have altered glazing.	II
Cottages, Lower Balcony Farm; 53.52626°N 2.74316°W	—	Late 18th century (probable)	A row of three sandstone cottages with a stone-slate roof. They have two storeys, one cottage has two bays, and the others have one bay each. The doorways have square heads and rectangular lintels. The windows are casements with moulded jambs.	II
Mere Cottage; 53.53852°N 2.72195°W	—	Late 18th century (probable)	A sandstone house with a stone-slate roof, in two storeys, and with a two-bay front and a rear extension. On the front is a wooden gabled porch and sliding sash windows. In the right gable wall is a doorway with a plain surround. At the rear is one sliding sash window, the other windows being casements.	II
Millets Farmhouse and barn 53.52183°N 2.74493°W	—	Late 18th century (probable)	The farmhouse consists of a main range, and an earlier rear wing linking to a barn and stable dated 1835. Both parts of the farmhouse have two storeys. The main range is pebbledashed with sandstone dressings and a slate roof, It has a symmetrical two-bay front, rusticated quoins, and sash windows with architraves. The doorway is in the west gable wall. The rear wing is rendered with a stone-slate roof. It has two wings, a central doorway, sash windows in the upper floor, and altered windows below. The barn range is in sandstone with a slate roof, and has four bays. It contains doorways, windows, a circular pitching hole, and a datestone.	II
Old Dog Inn; 53.54111°N 2.72292°W		Late 18th century (probable)	The public house is in stuccoed stone with a slate roof. There are two storeys, a main range of two bays, and a cross wing that is flush at the front and the rear. In the main range is a plain doorway with two casement windows to the left, and a sliding sash window and a window with altered glazing to the right. The wing contains a round-headed doorway with a moulded surround and a fanlight, and two sash windows. There is a small 20th-century extension to the right.	II
The Fox Inn and stable 53.55858°N 2.72900°W		Late 18th century (probable)	The public house is roughcast and has a composition tile roof. It is in two storeys, and has three bays with extensions at the rear. On the front is a doorway with reeded pilasters and a semicircular canopy. To the right is a two-storey former stable with one bay, and a doorway with a rectangular lintel. The windows on the inn and the stable are casements.	II
25 and 27 Tontine Road; 53.53435°N 2.71847°W	—	1788	Originally a pair of cottages, later combined into one dwelling. It is in sandstone with a stone-slate roof, and is in two storeys and two bays. There are two doorways with rectangular lintels, the one to the left inscribed with initials and the date. There are two square windows in each floor containing altered glazing.	II
Farm buildings, Knowles Farm; 53.55672°N 2.72948°W	—	Late 18th or early 19th century	The buildings consist of a barn with a shippon, and an attached cart shed and stable. They are in sandstone with asbestos sheet roofs, and are in an L-shaped plan. In the buildings are opposed wagon entrances, doorways, a re-used mullioned window, and a re-used datestone. The stable also has external steps leading to first floor loft doorways. (Note: Street View in March 2009 shows that the farm buildings have been converted for domestic use.)	II
Plough and Harrow Hotel; 53.54042°N 2.74517°W		Late 18th or early 19th century (probable)	A public house in sandstone with a stone-slate roof in two storeys. It has a two-bay main range, an extension to the right, and 20th-century extensions to the rear. There is a gabled porch on the front of the main range, and another on the extension. The windows on the ground floor have altered glazing, and in the upper floor they have transomed top-hung casements.	II
Sandbrook House and wall 53.53269°N 2.71812°W	—	Late 18th or early 19th century (probable)	A stuccoed sandstone house with a composition tile roof. There are three storeys and two bays. In the ground floor are canted bay windows with sash windows, pilasters, dentilled friezes, and moulded cornices. The middle storey has sash windows and the top floor has casements, all with architraves. The doorway in the right gable wall has a 20th-century gabled porch. Attached to the house is a wall continuing to the rear.	II
Shippon block, Lower Balcony Farm; 53.52640°N 2.74307°W	—	Late 18th or early 19th century (probable)	The farm building is in sandstone with a stone-slate roof. It has two storeys and three bays. The building contains stable doorways, windows, loading doors, and other openings.	II
19, 21 and 23 Tontine Road; 53.53438°N 2.71864°W	—	c. 1800	A row of three sandstone cottages with slate roofs in two storeys. Each cottage has one bay, there are extensions to the rear, and the doorways are to the left. The doorways and windows have been altered; in the ground floor the windows are square, and above they are rectangular.	II
Knowles Farmhouse; 53.55654°N 2.72887°W	—	1808	Originally a farmhouse, later used for other purposes, it is in sandstone with quoins and a composition tile roof. The main range has two storeys and a symmetrical two-bay front. The central round-headed doorway has a long-and-short surround, and above it is a datestone. The windows are casements, those in the lower floor with wedge lintels, and those in the upper floor with thin rectangular lintels. On each side are extensions.	II
36 Roby Mill; 53.56041°N 2.72955°W	—	1812	A roughcast house with a stone-slate roof, in two storeys. It has a symmetrical two-bay front. The central doorway has a plain surround, and the windows are sashes with central mullions. In the upper floor is a datestone.	II
Conservative Club; 53.54034°N 2.72152°W	—	1822	Originally a vicarage, later used as a club, the building is in sandstone with a stone-slate roof, and is in Classical style. There are two storeys and a basement, and a symmetrical three-bay front with a chamfered plinth and a gutter cornice. The central round-headed doorway has a Tuscan doorcase with engaged columns, fluted entablatures, an open pediment, and a blocked fanlight. The windows have wedge lintels, those in the ground floor are sashes, and in the upper floor they are top-hung casements. The left return has basement windows and a pedimented gable containing a datestone. In the right return is a latrine turret.	II
22 Dingle Road; 53.54281°N 2.72625°W	—	Early 19th century (probable)	A sandstone house with a slate roof, in two storeys. It has a symmetrical front of two bays, and a lean-to extension at the rear. The central doorway has a wedge lintel, and the windows are sashes.	II
Ayrefield Farmhouse; 53.56850°N 2.72096°W	—	Early 19th century	The farmhouse is in sandstone with a composition tile roof. There are two storeys, and a symmetrical gabled three-bay entrance front. The central doorway has pilastered jambs, a wedge lintel, and a fanlight. The windows have monolith jambs, wedge lintels and altered glazing. At the rear are two mullioned windows.	II
Bank Top House; 53.56310°N 2.72582°W	—	Early 19th century (probable)	A sandstone house with a composition tile roof, in two storeys with attics. It has an L-shaped plan, with a symmetrical five-bay front and a rear wing. The central doorway has a moulded architrave and a cornice. Most of the windows are sashes, those on the front of the house having wedge lintels. On the right return is a casement window, and a round-headed stair window with a keystone.	II
Piers with lamps, Church of St Thomas the Martyr; 53.54051°N 2.72153°W	—	Early 19th century (probable)	A pair of rusticated stone piers are at the entrance to the churchyard. They carry a semicircular wrought iron overthrow decorated with scrolls and with a lamp on the apex.	II
Wall, Lower Balcony Farm; 53.52638°N 2.74297°W	—	Early 19th century (probable)	The wall forms the boundary to the farmyard. It is a dry stone wall in sandstone and is about 30 metres (98 ft) long. The wall contains a gateway, and is ramped at the south end.	II
Wash house, Lower Pimbo Farm; 53.52705°N 2.74018°W	—	Early 19th century (probable)	The former wash house is in sandstone with a slate roof. It has a rectangular two-room plan, one storey, and sash windows. Inside is a large fireplace with parts of a cast iron range, a washing boiler, and an original Victorian wooden washing machine.	II
Barn, 192 Ormskirk Road; 53.54099°N 2.74633°W	—	Early to mid 19th century (probable)	Originally a barn and stable, later used for other purposes, it is in sandstone with a stone-slate roof. There are four bays, a rear outshut, and lean-to addition at the south. The building contains a wagon entrance, doorways, a loading door, and ventilation slits.	II
Stable or granary, 192 Ormskirk Road; 53.54102°N 2.74608°W	—	Early to mid 19th century (probable)	A sandstone building, later used for other purposes, with a stone-slate roof. It has a rectangular plan and two storeys. It contains a doorway, a window, and external steps leading to a first-floor loft doorway.	II
Coach house, stable and cart shed, Lower Balcony Farm; 53.52645°N 2.74337°W	—	Early to mid 19th century (probable)	A range of sandstone buildings with stone-slate roofs. The coach house has two storeys and contains a segmental-headed carriage entrance, square-headed doorways, and a loading door. The stable to the right is lower, with two storeys, and has a stable door, a circular pitching hole, and windows. The cart shed, further to the right, has one storey, and contains two square-headed cart openings.	II
Bridge over railway, Pimbo Lane; 53.52848°N 2.74053°W	—	1846–48	The bridge was built by the Liverpool and Bury Railway Company to carry Pimbo Lane over the railway. It is built in sandstone and consists of a single segmental arch. The bridge has imposts, broad pilasters, a moulded band, and a parapet with ridged coping.	II
Bridge over railway, Sandbrook Road; 53.53075°N 2.71830°W	—	1846–48	The bridge was built by the Liverpool and Bury Railway Company to carry Sandbrook Road over the railway. It is built in sandstone and consists of a single segmental arch. The bridge has imposts, broad pilasters, a moulded band, and a parapet with ridged coping.	II
Up Holland Tunnel, east portal 53.53064°N 2.72184°W		1846–48	The tunnel was built by the Liverpool and Bury Railway Company. The portal is in sandstone and consists of a horseshoe arch with a moulded surround and a short parapet.	II
Up Holland Tunnel, west portal 53.52913°N 2.73482°W		1846–48	The tunnel was built by the Liverpool and Bury Railway Company. The portal is in sandstone and consists of a horseshoe arch with a moulded surround. It has flanking pilasters, a plain cornice, and a parapet with a central upstand.	II
Blackledge House; 53.53989°N 2.72979°W	—	1847	A sandstone house with a slate roof in two storeys and with a symmetrical three-bay front. The central round-headed doorway has imposts, a keystone, and a fanlight. The windows are sashes with raised sills and wedge lintels. At the rear is a service wing, partly in brick and partly in stone, and in one and two storeys.	II
Garnett Lees Farmhouse and wall 53.54119°N 2.74632°W	—	1849	The former farmhouse is in sandstone with a stone-slate roof, it is in two storeys with a symmetrical three-bay front, and has a service wing at the rear. The doorway has plain jambs, moulded imposts, a keystone, and a fanlight. The windows are sashes with raised sills and wedge lintels. In the centre of the upper floor is a small round-headed window. The left gable wall contains a datestone. The wall surrounding the garden is about 1 metre (3 ft 3 in) high, and has a central gateway with round-topped gateposts.	II
Wesleyan Methodist Chapel and School; 53.54077°N 2.71974°W	—	1849	The chapel and school are now used for other purposes. The building is in sandstone with a stone-slate roof, and has two storeys and three bays. The doorway to the left has a blocked fanlight. The windows are sashes, those in the ground floor having rusticated pseudo-voussoirs and raised keystones. In the upper floor is an inscribed stone plaque.	II
30 Parliament Street; 53.54312°N 2.72345°W	—	19th century (probable)	A sandstone house with stone-slate roofs, in two storeys with attics and cellars, and in Jacobean style. Facing the road are three gabled bays with mullioned, or mullioned and transomed, windows. The entrance is in the right return, which has two gabled bays. The doorway has a pilastered architrave, each bay has a canted bay window, and the windows on this front are sashes.	II
1 Roby Mill; 53.55891°N 2.72944°W	—	Mid 19th century (probable)	The house is in sandstone with a stone-slate roof. It has two storeys and one bay. The doorway to the right has a rectangular lintel. On each floor is a square window with 20th-century glazing.	II
5 and 7 Roby Mill and wall 53.55908°N 2.72953°W	—	Mid 19th century	A pair of sandstone cottages with a slate roof, in two storeys. Each cottage has a one-bay front. The doorways are to the left and have plain jambs and lintels. The windows are sashes, those in the ground floor having wedge lintels. In front of No. 5 is a stone slab wall.	II
Lower Balcony Farmhouse; 53.52620°N 2.74350°W	—	Mid 19th century (probable)	The farmhouse is in sandstone with a stone-slate roof, and is in Jacobean style. It has two storeys, and a three-bay front. The central bay projects forward to form a two-storey gabled porch, which contains a square-headed doorway with a double-chamfered surround, a fanlight, and a hood mould. The windows are sashes. At the rear is a single-storey gabled porch.	II
Methodist Church; 53.55840°N 2.72916°W		1860	A small Methodist chapel in sandstone with a slate roof, and a gabled and symmetrical entrance front. In the centre is a stone round-headed doorway with moulded imposts, a keystone, and a fanlight containing stained glass. On each side of the doorway is a window with a similar head to the doorway, each of which contains Art Deco stained glass. Above the doorway is a datestone, and in the gable is a quatrefoil. On the left side is a small flat-roofed extension.	II
15 and 17 Tontine Road; 53.53439°N 2.71873°W	—	1861	A pair of sandstone cottages with quoins; one cottage has a roof of slate and the other of composition tiles. There are two storeys, and each cottage has one bay. The doorways are to the left, and the windows have chamfered reveals.	II
Barn, Lower Balcony Farm; 53.52661°N 2.74314°W		Mid to late 19th century (probable)	A sandstone barn with a stone-slate roof, in a rectangular plan with five bays. It contains a large wagon entrance with a porch, and ventilation slits.	II
188 Ormskirk Road; 53.54083°N 2.74597°W	—	1868	A sandstone house with a slate roof in two storeys. It has a symmetrical two-bay front and a rear outshut. In the centre is a round-headed doorway with plain jambs, imposts and a keystone. The windows have raised sills and wedge lintels and contain altered glazing. In the centre of the upper floor is a datestone.	II
Roby Mill primary school 53.55912°N 2.72870°W	—	c. 1870	The school is in sandstone with slate roofs and red ridge tiles, and is in Gothic style. It consists of a gabled main range with a smaller gabled wing to the left, and there is a lean-to porch across the front. The porch has a segmental-headed doorway, and there are segmental-headed windows in the porch and along the sides of the school. The gable ends both contain stepped lancet windows. On the main gable is an apex chimney, and there is a small pinnacle at the left corner.	II
186 Ormskirk Road; 53.54059°N 2.74586°W	—	Late 19th century	The house is mainly in sandstone, with rendered gables, and brick at the rear. It has two storeys, and an L-shaped plan. The front has two bays, a 20th-century glazed porch, and sash windows with wedge lintels.	II
Wash house, Rothwell House; 53.54709°N 2.72120°W	—	Late 19th century (probable)	The former wash house is in brick with a slate roof. It is a small rectangular building with sliding sash window in each long wall.	II
St Joseph's College; 53.55305°N 2.73201°W		1880–83	A former Roman Catholic college that was extended in 1921–28, and later converted into apartments. It is in sandstone with roofs of slate, and is in Gothic style. The original part forms the west range of a courtyard, it has three storeys with an attic, a symmetrical front of 17 bays, and a central bellcote on the ridge. The south range contains the entrance, and has three and four storeys with a basement, a symmetrical front of 23 bays, and four-storey towers with open parapets in the centre and at the corners. The east range has 20 bays and a tower surmounted by an observatory dome, and the north range has 16 bays. Most of the windows are sashes, with some lancets and dormers. There is also a chapel with a nave and chancel in one vessel, a north transept, and an unfinished south tower.	II
Entrance lodge and gate piers, St Joseph's College; 53.55186°N 2.72715°W	—	c. 1880–90	The lodge is in sandstone with a slate roof, it is in two storeys, and in simple Gothic style. The lodge is in an L-shaped plan, with a main range and a two-bay cross wing to the right. The doorway is in the angle, and the windows are sashes. The two gate piers are square with chamfered corners. The upper stages are octagonal, and have octagonal caps with pseudo-lucarnes. The gates are in wrought iron.	II
War memorial 53.54639°N 2.72631°W		1927	The war memorial is in Portland stone and stands 6.1 metres (20 ft) high. It has a square base with steps on the north side. On the base is a low plinth, a stepped pedestal, and a tapering obelisk with a flat stepped top. On the sides of the base are inscribed tablets with the names of the fallen, and at the corners are flaming torches carved in relief. The sides of the obelisk also carry inscriptions, a bronze wreath, and swords in relief.	II
Telephone kiosk 53.56017°N 2.72981°W	—	1935	A K6 type telephone kiosk, designed by Giles Gilbert Scott. Constructed in cast iron with a square plan and a dome, it has three unperforated crowns in the top panels.	II
St Thersa's Church and parish rooms 53.54910°N 2.72770°W		1955–57	The Roman Catholic church was designed by F. X. Velarde, with carvings and castings by H. Tyson Smith. It is in brick with stone dressings and a tile roof, and consists of a nave with a clerestory and a porch, a single aisle, a chancel, and a detached tower. The windows have mullions carved as angels or doves. The tower has a circular window, a carving of the Pietà, diamond-shaped stair windows, round-arched bell openings, and a pyramidal copper roof with a golden cross. Attached to the church is a parish room and vestry, also with carved mullions.	II
Up Holland School; 53.52888°N 2.71856°W		1958–60	The school is built in reinforced concrete with brick walls and flat roofs, and is mainly in two storeys. There is a corridor spine with classrooms, assembly halls and a gymnasium leading from it. The classrooms are glazed with timber frames.	II

== Notes and references ==
=== Sources ===
- Historic England, "Up Holland Priory remains (1219780)", National Heritage List for England
- Historic England, "Up Holland Benedictine priory (1013649)", National Heritage List for England
- Historic England, "Church of St Thomas the Martyr, Up Holland (1201666)", National Heritage List for England
- Historic England, "Lower Tower Hill Farmhouse, Up Holland (1282595)", National Heritage List for England
- Historic England, "Barn approximately 30 metres south-east of Lower Tower Hill Farmhouse, Up Holland (1291036)", National Heritage List for England
- Historic England, "Nos. 29 and 31 School Lane, Up Holland (1220223)", National Heritage List for England
- Historic England, "Bounty Farmhouse, Up Holland (1201638)", National Heritage List for England
- Historic England, "Dean House Farmhouse, Up Holland (1291280)", National Heritage List for England
- Historic England, "Lancashire Lodge, Up Holland (1201643)", National Heritage List for England
- Historic England, "Old Grammar School, to rear of Nos. 8-14 School Lane, Up Holland (1220218)", National Heritage List for England
- Historic England, "The Owl Inn, Up Holland (1201608)", National Heritage List for England
- Historic England, "Derby House, Up Holland (1220236)", National Heritage List for England
- Historic England, "Johnson's Farmhouse, Up Holland (1219837)", National Heritage List for England
- Historic England, "Holland Hall Hotel, Up Holland (1201669)", National Heritage List for England
- Historic England, "Barn to south-east of Johnson's Farmhouse with attached shippons and cart shed, Up Holland (1282602)", National Heritage List for England
- Historic England, "Barn approximately 2 metres south of Bounty Farmhouse, Up Holland (1219988)", National Heritage List for England
- Historic England, "Moss Farmhouse, Up Holland (1201633)", National Heritage List for England
- Historic England, "Nos. 4 and 6 School Lane, Up Holland (1201649)", National Heritage List for England
- Historic England, "Ambrose Cottage, Up Holland (1219960)", National Heritage List for England
- Historic England, "College Farmhouse, Up Holand (1220246)", National Heritage List for England
- Historic England, "High Walthew Green Farmhouse, Up Holand (1201613)", National Heritage List for England
- Historic England, "Newgate Farmhouse, Up Holland (1219813)", National Heritage List for England
- Historic England, "Knights House, Up Holland (1220148)", National Heritage List for England
- Historic England, "Manor House, Up Holland (1201667)", National Heritage List for England
- Historic England, "Gate piers at Manor House, Up Holland (1219807)", National Heritage List for England
- Historic England, "No. 3 Roby Mill, Parliament Street, Up Holland (1220073)", National Heritage List for England
- Historic England, "Nos. 47–53 Parliament Street, Up Holland (1201637)", National Heritage List for England
- Historic England, "Gate piers at entrance to Knights House, Up Holland (1282571)", National Heritage List for England
- Historic England, "Barn approximately 30 metres south-east of Lower Pimbo Farmhouse, Up Holland (1201642)", National Heritage List for England
- Historic England, "Tan Pit Cottages, Up Holland (1220131)", National Heritage List for England
- Historic England, "Nos.182 and 184 Ormskirk Road, Up Holland (1291236)", National Heritage List for England
- Historic England, "Nos. 2, 2A and 4 Stoney Brow, Up Holland (1201609)", National Heritage List for England
- Historic England, "Alma Hill Farmhouse and Alma Hill Cottage, Up Holland (1201665)", National Heritage List for England
- Historic England, "Two cottages on west side of lane opposite Johnson's Farmhouse, Up Holland (1201629)", National Heritage List for England
- Historic England, "Pair of gate piers approximately 50 metres south-west of Lancashire Lodge, Up Holland (1220071)", National Heritage List for England
- Historic England, "Lower Pimbo Farmhouse with attached garden wall, Up Holland (1220027)", National Heritage List for England
- Historic England, "Priory House, Up Holland (1291310)", National Heritage List for England
- Historic England, "Rothwell House, Up Holland (1282564)", National Heritage List for England
- Historic England, "Mill House, Up Holland (1282565)", National Heritage List for England
- Historic England, "Windmill in garden of No. 53 Mill Lane, Up Holland (1201631)", National Heritage List for England
- Historic England, "Nos. 38, 40 and 42 Roby Mill, Up Holland (1220125)", National Heritage List for England
- Historic England, "Nos. 3–13 Walthew Green, Up Holland (1291040)", National Heritage List for England
- Historic England, "Nos. 29–41 Dingle Road, Up Holland (1291276)", National Heritage List for England
- Historic England, "Nos. 65 and 67 Ormskirk Road, Up Holland (1201632)", National Heritage List for England
- Historic England, "No. 180 Ormskirk Road, Up Holland (1282567)", National Heritage List for England
- Historic England, "Nos. 9 and 11 Roby Mill, Up Holland (1291144)", National Heritage List for England
- Historic England, "Nos. 18 and 20 Roby Mill, Up Holland (1282570)", National Heritage List for England
- Historic England, "Nos. 57 and 59 School Lane, Up Holland (1282593)", National Heritage List for England
- Historic England, "Nos. 6 and 8 Tithebarn Street, Up Holland (1282594)", National Heritage List for England
- Historic England, "Nos. 29 and 31 Tontine Road, Up Holland (1220293)", National Heritage List for England
- Historic England, "Coach-house and Rock House, Up Holland (1219949)", National Heritage List for England
- Historic England, "Cottages on east side of farmyard at Lower Balcony Farm, Up Holland (1282568)", National Heritage List for England
- Historic England, "Mere Cottage, Up Holland (1201668)", National Heritage List for England
- Historic England, "Millets Farmhouse and attached barn, Up Holland (1291157)", National Heritage List for England
- Historic England, "Old Dog Inn, Up Holland (1291346)", National Heritage List for England
- Historic England, "The Fox Inn and attached former stable, Up Holland (1282572)", National Heritage List for England
- Historic England, "Nos. 25 and 27 Tontine Road, Up Holland (1220290)", National Heritage List for England
- Historic England, "Farm buildings approximately 20 metres north-west of Knowles Farmhouse, Up Holland (1201647)", National Heritage List for England
- Historic England, "Plough and Harrow Hotel, Up Holland (1282566)", National Heritage List for England
- Historic England, "Sandbrook House and attached wall, Up Holland (1291100)", National Heritage List for England
- Historic England, "Shippon block on east side of farmyard at Lower Balcony Farm, Up Holland (1220014)", National Heritage List for England
- Historic England, "Nos. 19, 21 and 23 Tontine Road, Up Holland (1201611)", National Heritage List for England
- Historic England, "Knowles Farmhouse, Up Holland (1220159)", National Heritage List for England
- Historic England, "36 Roby Mill, Up Holland (1291146)", National Heritage List for England
- Historic England, "Conservative Club, Up Holland (1282582)", National Heritage List for England
- Historic England, "No. 22 Dingle Road, Up Holland (1282544)", National Heritage List for England
- Historic England, "Ayrefield Farmhouse, Up Holland (1282581)", National Heritage List for England
- Historic England, "Bank Top House, Up Holland (1201645)", National Heritage List for England
- Historic England, "Stone piers with iron lamp at foot of steps to churchyard, St Thomas the Martyr, Up Holland (1219765)", National Heritage List for England
- Historic England, "Wall forming east boundary of Lower Balcony Farm yard, Up Holland (1201641)", National Heritage List for England
- Historic England, "Wash-house building approximately 3 metres west of Lower Pimbo Farmhouse, Up Holland (1291191)", National Heritage List for England
- Historic England, "Barn approximately 5 metres south-west of No. 192 Ormskirk Road, Up Holland (1201635)", National Heritage List for England
- Historic England, "Stable or granary approximately 15 metres south-east of No. 192 Ormskirk Road, Up Holland (1291217)", National Heritage List for England
- Historic England, "Coach house/cart shed range on west side of farmyard at Lower Balcony Farm, Up Holland (1291209)", National Heritage List for England
- Historic England, "Bridge over railway, Up Holland (1201639)", National Heritage List for England
- Historic England, "Bridge over railway, Up Holland (1201648)", National Heritage List for England
- Historic England, "Up Holland Tunnel, east portal (1220198)", National Heritage List for England
- Historic England, "Up Holland Tunnel, west portal (1220067)", National Heritage List for England
- Historic England, "Blackledge House, Up Holland (1201612)", National Heritage List for England
- Historic England, "Garnett Lees Farmhouse, with attached front garden wall, Up Holland (1219920)", National Heritage List for England
- Historic England, "Wesleyan Methodist Chapel and School, Up Holland (1282592)", National Heritage List for England
- Historic England, "No. 30 Parliament Street, Up Holland (1201636)", National Heritage List for England
- Historic England, "No. 1 Roby Mill, Up Holland (1282569)", National Heritage List for England
- Historic England, "Nos. 5 and 7 Roby Mill with stone slab wall in front of No.5, Up Holland (1201644)", National Heritage List for England
- Historic England, "Lower Balcony Farmhouse, Up Holland (1291205)", National Heritage List for England
- Historic England, "Methodist Church, Up Holland (1220166)", National Heritage List for England
- Historic England, "Nos. 15 and 17 Tontine Road, Up Holland (1220287)", National Heritage List for England
- Historic England, "Barn at north end of farmyard to north of Lower Balcony Farmhouse, Up Holland (1201640)", National Heritage List for England
- Historic England, "No. 188 Ormskirk Road, Up Holland (1201634)", National Heritage List for England
- Historic England, "No. 186 Ormskirk Road, Up Holland (1291245)", National Heritage List for England
- Historic England, "Roby Mill Church of England Primary School, Up Holland (1291086)", National Heritage List for England
- Historic England, "Wash-house approximately 5 metres south-west of Rothwell House, Up Holland (1201630)", National Heritage List for England
- Historic England, "St Joseph's Roman Catholic College, Up Holland (1201610)", National Heritage List for England
- Historic England, "Entrance lodge and gate piers to St Joseph's College, Up Holland (1220281)", National Heritage List for England
- Historic England, "War memorial, Up Holland (1391711)", National Heritage List for England
- Historic England, "K6 Telephone Kiosk opposite No.34 Roby Mill, Up Holland (1201646)", National Heritage List for England
- Historic England, "St Theresa of the Child Jesus Roman Catholic Church and attached Parish Rooms, Up Holland (1379930)", National Heritage List for England
- Historic England, "Up Holland School (1220214)", National Heritage List for England
- Pollard, Richard; Pevsner, Nikolaus (2006), Lancashire: Liverpool and the South-West, The Buildings of England, New Haven and London: Yale University Press, ISBN 0-300-10910-5
- Historic England, Listed Buildings
