= Stewart Dugdale =

English film score composer

- Born: Stewart John Dugdale; 24 July 1976 (age 48); Southampton, Hampshire, England
- Occupation: Composer
- Years active: 2012–present

Stewart John Dugdale is an English film score composer known for his work on the crime thriller Welcome to Curiosity and his award-winning score on the short film Do Not Disturb as well as feature films, A Room to Die For and From Bedrooms to Billions.

== Early years ==
Dugdale was born in Southampton, United Kingdom on 24 July 1976. He studied law at Solent University in 1997 and completed a post graduate diploma in Law in 2000 and qualified as a barrister by being called to Inner Temple in July 2000. At this time Dugdale had self taught himself the guitar and was playing in bands and gigging local pubs while writing new songs. In his college days Dugdale had an interest in music and was committed to becoming an expert guitarist while also learning how to record his music. Initially he started recording his original material to tape and by using two tape machines was able to record a guitar line then playback the recorded material and record a second guitar and vocals into the second machine thus creating a 3 track mix. In around 1997, Dugdale picked up a Fostex multitrack recording allowing him to record more fuller mixes.

== Demo EP and In a Lifetime ==
In 2001, Dugdale took time away from full time work at as a paralegal for a solicitor firm to record a demo EP which he completely recorded himself playing every part as well as singing the vocals. Whilst the album was played on some local audio stations such as South City FM and Wave 105FM Dugdale realised his strength lay in composition rather than as a singer/songwriter. In 2004 Dugdale started writing a new album using singing contacts he had made through his work with the Southampton City Council and in that summer recorded a new album entitled In a Lifetime.

== Producer, guitar tutor and Joe Brooks manager ==
In 2006, Dugdale gave up his "Day Job" to pursue a career in the music industry and throughout the period up to 2010 he produced local solo artists albums, recorded and produced for local bands, taught guitar for beginners and wrote for various music libraries. In 2006 Dugdale met a local singer/songwriter called Joe Brooks . Dugdale was so impressed with Joe's talent that he offered to manage him and in the summer of 2006 they recorded Joe's Demo EP, "Maybe Tomorrow". After Joe received interested from Tim Byrne (Steps and A1) it was agreed that Joe would sign with him.

== Composing for film ==
In 2012 a producer friend of Dugdale's offered him the role of composer on the indie comedy Drunk on Love. After this Dugdale realised that scoring to picture was what he wished to pursue on a permanent basis and has subsequently worked on many short and feature length films.

== Selected filmography as composer ==
| Year | Film | Director | Awards/Notes |
|---|---|---|---|
| 2014 | From Bedrooms to Billions | Anthony Caufield | |
| 2015 | Do Not Disturb | Jon James Smith | Best Music - British Horror Film Festival |
| 2017 | A Room to Die For | Devanand Shanmugam | |
| 2017 | Long Drive Home | Michael J Berwick | |
| 2018 | Welcome to Curiosity | Ben Pickering | Additional music |
| 2021 | The Darkness | Tharun Mohan | |
| 2022 | Journey Home | Christopher Houlston | |
| 2022 | Last Orders | Jon James Smith | |
