= The Guvnors =

- Directed by: Gabe Turner
- Written by: Gabe Turner
- Starring: Martin Hancock; Vas Blackwood; Harley Sylvester; David Essex; Doug Allen
- Cinematography: James Friend
- Music by: Paul Arnold; Andrew Barnabas; Pascal Bideau
- Distributed by: Metrodome Distribution
- Release date: 24 June 2014
- Running time: 95 minutes
- Country: United Kingdom
- Language: English

The Guvnors is a 2014 British crime film directed by Gabe Turner. Former football hooligan Cass Pennant was involved in producing the film.

== Plot ==
Mitch, the ex-leader of a London firm known as The Guvnors, has walked away from his life of violence and more than 20 years later is happily married in the suburbs. He becomes concerned when his son starts to show violent tendencies through his behaviour at school. His wife Angie receives phone calls from his former associates, who he warns off.

During a stop-and-search, gangster Adam Shanko is mocked by DC Meyler as a pale imitation of the Guvnors. Shanko becomes obsessed with proving his superiority and visits the pub which served as the Guvnors' former base. During a confrontation at the pub, he is humiliated by the pensioner Mickey and footage of the incident goes viral, damaging Shanko's reputation. Mickey was a boxing coach who served as a mentor to the Guvnors during their heyday. Shanko's right-hand man Trey tracks down Mitch and threatens his son, while Shanko beats Mickey to death in his home.

After news about Mickey reaches him, Mitch returns to his former patch. The remaining Guvnors mostly give him a cool reception, since he abandoned them without explanation 20 years previously, and they hold him responsible for the death of their member Charlie, who was isolated and killed by a rival firm while searching for Mitch after his disappearance. Mitch wins them round and goes to visit Shanko, who he realises is his son. Mitch had an affair with Shanko's mother, who became pregnant and threatened to tell Angie unless Mitch left the area immediately, hence his sudden abandonment of the Guvnors. Mitch tells Shanko that he will have to face him on the streets if he wants to restore his reputation.

Mitch tells the other Guvnors about his connection to Shanko but acknowledges he will have to fight him. Meyler, who it is revealed is another former Guvnor, arrests Trey but is unable to get critical information out of him about Shanko's firearms. He nevertheless promises Angie he will bring Mitch home safely. Shanko assembles a large group to fight the Guvnors. In a clash between the two firms, Mitch gets the better of Shanko while fighting hand-to-hand, but Shanko shoots him. As the gangs scatter, Meyler arrives and arrests Shanko. He calls an ambulance for Mitch, but he dies of his wound.

In prison, Shanko reads a letter Mitch wrote him shortly before the fight. As the film ends, Mitch's son approaches Shanko's younger brother while he is playing football, the result of the meeting left uncertain.

== Cast ==
- Doug Allen as Mitch
- Harley Sylvester as Adam
- David Essex as Mickey Snr
- Vas Blackwood as Bill
- Jay Simpson as Neil
- Jumayn Hunter as Woods
- Martin Hancock as DC Meyler
- Richard Blackwood as PC Benson
- Charley Palmer Merkell as Trey
- Barrington Patterson as Baz
- Tony Denham as Trent
- Melanie Gutteridge as Angie
- Paul Reynolds as Tone

== Reception ==
On review aggregator Rotten Tomatoes, the film holds an approval rating of 38% based on 8 reviews, with an average rating of 4.75/10. Mike McCahill, film critic of The Guardian gave the film 2/5 stars saying the film "treats one-time football hooligans as if they were Camelot knights, and features a twinkly David Essex".
