= Listed buildings in Burntwood =

Burntwood is a civil parish in the district of Lichfield, Staffordshire, England. It contains 16 buildings that are recorded in the National Heritage List for England. Of these, two are listed at Grade II*, the middle of the three grades, and the others are at Grade II, the lowest grade. The parish contains the town of Burntwood and the nearby countryside. Most of the listed buildings are in the periphery of the town or in the countryside. Most of them are houses and include two churches, cottages, farmhouses and farm buildings, the earlier of which are timber framed. The other listed buildings include two churches, a conduit head, a water pumping station, and a war memorial.

== Key ==
Grade	Criteria
II*	Particularly important buildings of more than special interest
II	Buildings of national importance and special interest

== Buildings ==
Name and location	Photograph	Date	Notes	Grade
Conduit head at SK 0923 0928; 52.68136°N 1.86495°W	—	Mid 12th century (probable)	The conduit head consists of large sandstone blocks, partly refaced in brick. They form a small square gabled structure set into a bank, and there is a small central entrance.	II*
Barn northwest of Pipe Hall; 52.68618°N 1.86908°W	—	17th century	The barn is timber framed with brick infill and partly weatherboarded, it is partly rebuilt in brick, and has a tile roof. There are three bays, and an outshut to the northeast.	II
The Burnthouse, Rugeley Road; 52.68075°N 1.90571°W	—	17th century	The cottage was later altered and extended. The original part is timber framed with brick infill, the extensions are in brick, and the roof is tiled. There is one storey and an attic, and two original bays, and the extension is to the right. On the front is a gabled porch, the windows are casements, and there are two gabled dormers.	II
The Old Beerhouse, Woodhouses Lane; 52.68123°N 1.88267°W		17th century	The cottage, which was altered later, is timber framed with infill and extensions in brick, and it has a thatched roof. There is one storey and an attic, and four bays. The windows are casements, one with a segmental head, and there are four gabled dormers.	II
Rake Croft, Rake Hill; 52.68575°N 1.91085°W	—	Late 17th or early 18th century	The cottage is rendered, probably over a timber framed core, and has a thatched roof. There is one storey and an attic, four bays, and a later extension on the left. The windows are casements, and there are two swept dormers.	II
Edial Hall, Lichfield Road; 52.67605°N 1.88199°W	—	Early 18th century	A red brick farmhouse with a floor band and a tile roof. There are two storeys and an attic, and three bays. On the front are two doorways with fanlights and pediments, the windows are casements, and there are three hipped dormers.	II
Darwin's Bath; 52.68784°N 1.85889°W	—	Early to mid 18th century	The upper parts were added in about 1890 and also in the 20th century, and the bath had been used for treatment by Erasmus Darwin. It has a sandstone base, brick walls, a corrugated iron roof, and a rectangular plan, with sides of 10 metres (33 ft) by 3 metres (9.8 ft).	II
57 Church Road; 52.67974°N 1.89907°W	—	18th century	The cottage, which was altered in the 20th century, is in painted brick and has a thatched roof. There is one storey and an attic, the original part has two bays, and there is a later extension to the left. The doorway has a segmental head, the windows are casements, and there are two swept dormers.	II
Fulfen, Rugeley Road; 52.68265°N 1.90513°W	—	Mid 18th century	A farmhouse, with possibly an earlier core, it is in red brick with a string course and a tile roof. There are two storeys and two bays. In the centre is a hipped porch, to its left is a three-light casement window, to the right is a tripartite sash window, and the upper floor contains two-light casement windows.	II
Pipe Hall; 52.68625°N 1.86811°W	—	Mid 18th century	A red brick farmhouse with a dentilled eaves cornice and a tile roof. There are two storeys and an attic, three bays, and a lean-to on the right. The windows are transomed casements.	II
32, 34 and 36 Rake Hill; 52.68628°N 1.91130°W	—	Late 18th century	A farmhouse, later divided into three, it is in red brick with stone dressings, a floor band, rusticated quoins, and a slate roof with verge parapets. There are three storeys, two bays, and a lower gabled wing on the right. The central doorway has a fanlight and a hood, in the ground floor are flat-roofed, three-sided bay windows, the middle floor contains sash windows, in the top floor the windows are casements; the windows in the upper floors have rusticated wedged heads.	II
Christ Church; 52.67948°N 1.89619°W		1819–20	The north aisle was added in 1869. The church is built in red brick with stone dressings and a tile roof. It consists of a nave, a north aisle, a chancel, and a west tower. The tower has two stages, diagonal buttresses, a moulded cornice, and an embattled parapet. The windows in the aisle are pointed with two lights, and the windows elsewhere contain Y-tracery.	II
Maple Hayes; 52.68400°N 1.85807°W		Early 19th century	A small country house in late Georgian style, it was extended in 1885–90 and later used for other purposes. The house is in red brick with stone dressings, on a plinth, and has a floor band, a cornice and a blocking course, and a hipped slate roof. There are three storeys, and five bays, flanked by two-storey canted bay windows with angle pilasters and balustrades. In the centre is a flat-roofed porch with a frieze, pilasters and a balustrade. The windows are sashes with wedge lintels, the window above the porch has a pediment on consoles.	II
St Anne's Church, Chasetown; 52.66974°N 1.93704°W		1865	The church is in polychromatic brick with some sandstone dressings and a slate roof, and is in Neo-Norman style. It consists of a west porch and baptistry, a nave with a clerestory and a chancel with a lower apse in one cell, and north and south gabled aisles. At the west end are pinnacles and a bellcote.	II*
Maple Brook Pumping Station; 52.69487°N 1.91149°W		1912–15	The pumping station was built by the South Staffordshire Waterworks Company. It is in red brick with dressings in cast stone and slate roofs. It consists of an engine house with a square plan, and at the rear is a boiler house with a rectangular plan, and a former workshop. The engine house has a single storey over a basement, and three bays on each front. It has a plinth, corner pilasters, a dentilled frieze, and a parapet raised in the centre and the ends, surmounted by ball finials. In the centre of the front, steps from the left lead to a doorway with a moulded surround, a fanlight, and a flat-headed canopy, and above the doorway is an inscribed and dated panel. The windows are tall and rectangular, with small panes and cast stone lintels. Inside there is a triple expansion steam engine.	II
Chase Terrace and Boney Hay War Memorial; 52.68786°N 1.93752°W		1921	The war memorial is outside St John's Church. It consists of an obelisk in Carrara marble on a base of Robin Hood stone. The square obelisk stands on a two-tier rectangular plinth, the lower tier having four buttresses. On the upper tier of the plinth are inscriptions and the names of those lost in the two World Wars.	II
