= A Room to Die For =

A Room To Die For
- Directed by: Devanand Shanmugam
- Written by: Matthew J. Gunn
- Produced by: Simon Cummins; Topher Cox; Pikki Fearon; David Hyland
- Starring: Michael Lieber; Vas Blackwood; Jon Campling; Christopher Craig; Loren Peta; Antonia Davies; Frederik Von Lüttichau
- Cinematography: Beatriz Delgado Mena
- Edited by: Eoghan Synnott
- Music by: Stewart Dugdale
- Release date: 16 January 2017
- Running time: 84 minutes
- Country: United Kingdom
- Language: English

A Room To Die For, aka Rancour, is a 2017 British thriller horror film directed by Devanand Shanmugam and written by Matthew J. Gunn. A Room To Die For was made by Champagne Charlie Productions in 2015 and distributed by 4 Digital Media and Sony Pictures Home Entertainment on 16 January 2017. The film stars Ves Blackwood, Michael Lieber, Jon Campling, Christopher Craig, Loren Peta, Antonia Davies, and Ben Ellis.

== Plot ==
A struggling, unstable stand-up comedian Marcus Crowe (Michael Lieber) and his girlfriend Jill Scott (Loren Peta) move into a vacant bedroom in the house of an elderly couple, Henry and Josephine Baker (Christopher Craig and Antonia Davies), in a quiet suburb of Oxfordshire in an effort to save money. As the story progresses and friction begins to build between a high-tempered Henry and a stir-crazy Marcus, it becomes more apparent that a sinister intention is drawing ever closer for the young couple. The sweet idyllic country home is bombarded by an intimidating policeman, unwanted phone calls and mysterious trams, and Marcus and Jill have completely disappeared from the room without a trace.

== Cast ==
- Michael Lieber as Mark Crowe
- Vas Blackwood as Detective McQueen
- Jon Campling as Gary the Tramp
- Loren Peta as Jill Scott
- Christopher Craig as Henry Baker
- Antonia Davies as Josephine Baker
- Frederik von Lüttichau as Detective Teller
- Ben Ellis as Jason Scott
- Natalie Ann Parry as Chloe
- Topher Cox as Ben
- Jonny Pert as Dead Boy

== Production ==
=== Casting ===
"I have great chemistry with Dev he has a real gentle way about him, he allowed us to improvise if we wished which is great as a performer because whether you are fond of improvising or not it always relaxes you to know you have the option."

— Michael Lieber, on working with Devanand Shanmugam (Director)

Castings were held in 2014 by Devanand Shanmugam (director), Matthew J. Gunn (script writer), and Topher Cox (producer) in Oxford, England. The first to be secured was Michael Lieber to play the lead role of Mark Crowe; he mentions this in a press interview for the Gulf News on 9 July 2014. Christopher Craig and Antonia Davies were cast shortly after to play Henry and Josephine Baker. The auditioning of the psychologically intense role of Jill Scott proved difficult and was recast several times before finally settling on Loren Peta. Minor roles and cameo appearance were resolved over the rehearsal period (Jon Campling as Gary the Tramp, Vas Blackwood as Detective McQueen, and Ben Ellis as Jill's brother Jason Scott).

=== Filming ===
Filming took place inside an old country house in suburban Oxfordshire, England, which was a converted Christian church. Other locations included a specially designed basement in the back garden of the property

== Reception ==
The film received mixed reviews from critics. gbhbl.com called A Room to Die For "one big mess of tired ideas".
