= Up Holland =

Coordinates: 53.541°N 2.728°W

- Village and parish
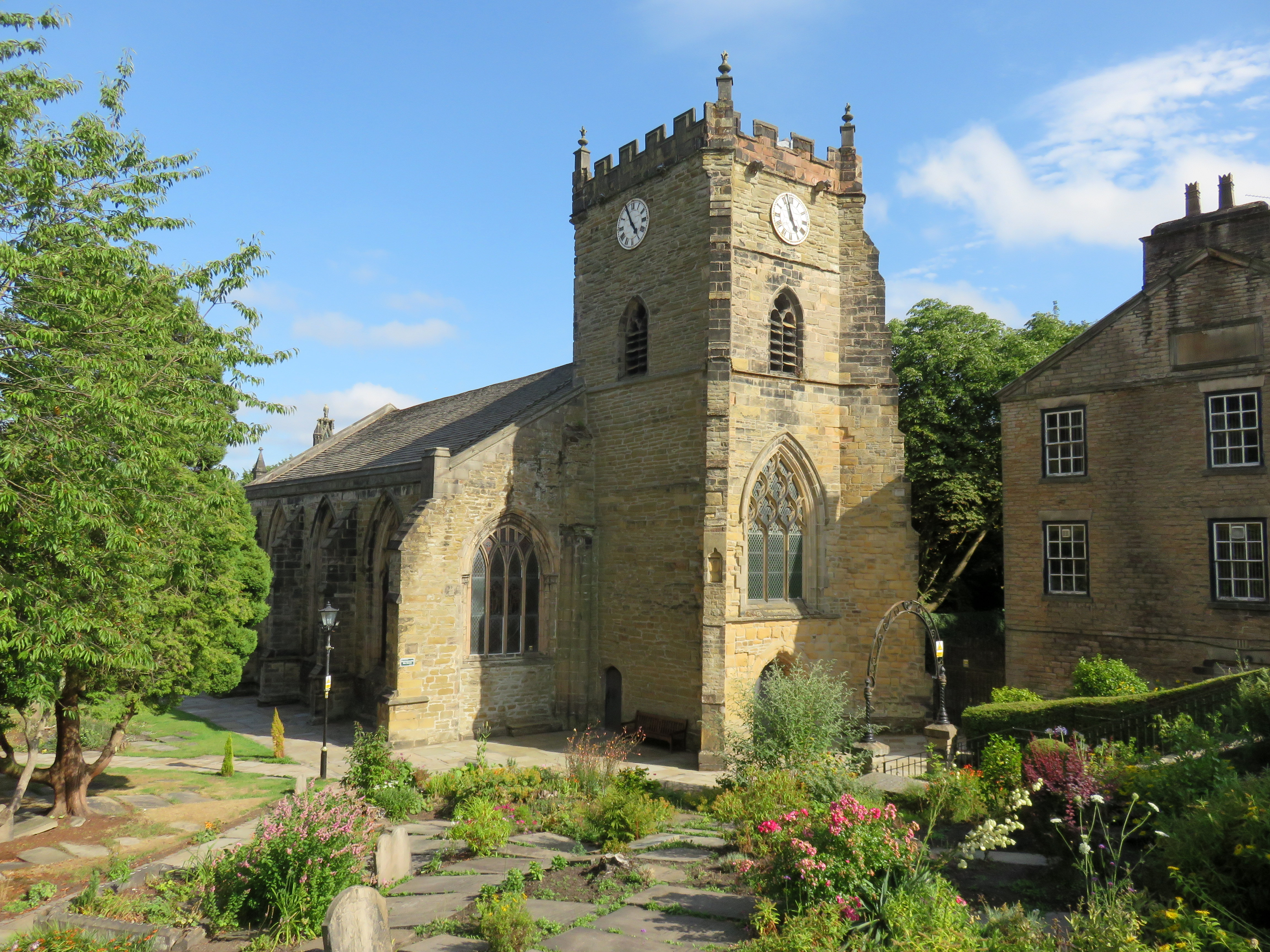
- St Thomas the Martyr Parish Church

- Location in West Lancashire Location within Lancashire
- Population: 7,376 (2011)
- OS grid reference: SD518052
- Civil parish: Up Holland
- District: West Lancashire
- Shire county: Lancashire
- Region: North West
- Country: England
- Sovereign state: United Kingdom
- Post town: Skelmersdale
- Postcode district: WN8
- Dialling code: 01695
- Police: Lancashire
- Fire: Lancashire
- Ambulance: North West
- UK Parliament: West Lancashire

Up Holland (or Upholland) is a village and civil parish in West Lancashire, England, 4 miles (6 km) west of Wigan. The population at the 2011 census was 7,376.

== Geography ==
The village is on a small hill 89m above sea level that rises above the West Lancashire Coastal Plain. There are views towards St Helens and Liverpool in the south west, Ormskirk and Southport in the north-west and towards Wigan, Manchester and on to the High Peak of Derbyshire in the east. The parish includes the Pimbo industrial estate.

== Toponymy ==
The place-name is first attested in the Domesday Book of 1086, where it appears as Hoiland. It appears as Upholand in a Lancashire Inquest of 1226. This is from the Old English hohland, meaning 'land on or by a hoe or spur of a hill'. The name Up Holland differentiates it from another place locally called Downholland, 10 miles to the west (on the other side of Ormskirk). The manor of Holland was a possession of the Holland family until 1534, whence it may be presumed they derived their name.

== Notable claims ==
George Lyon, reputed to be one of the last English highwaymen, is said to be buried in the churchyard of the Anglican Church of St. Thomas the Martyr. The truth of the matter is that Lyon was little more than a common thief and receiver of stolen goods. The grave can be found under the concrete parapet opposite the White Lion pub.

A burial place of greater historical significance can be found at the south east corner of the church. Here, in a railed enclosure is the grave of Robert Daglish; a pioneer in steam locomotive engineering and design. In 1814, when George Stephenson was still working on his early locomotive Blucher, Daglish built The Yorkshire Horse, a 'rack and pinion' locomotive to haul coal wagons at a nearby colliery. This proved to be a great success. Daglish went on to construct other locomotives and work on railway systems both in Great Britain and America.

Upholland railway station is on the Kirkby Branch Line.

== Religion ==
=== Anglican ===
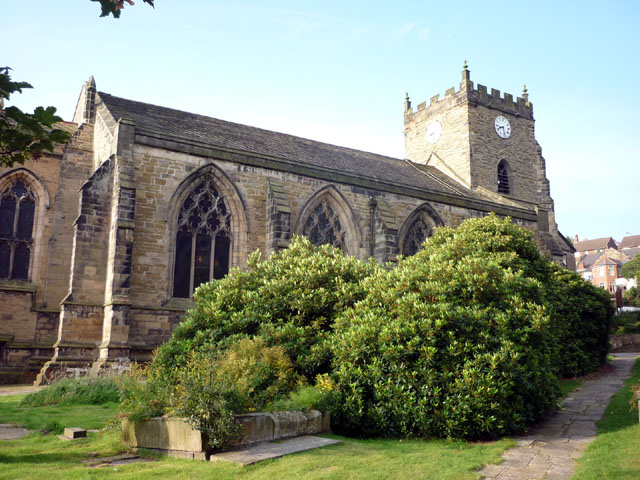
St. Thomas's Church

The Anglican parish church of St Thomas the Martyr was, until the time of the Protestant Reformation, a Benedictine monastic foundation.

=== Roman Catholic ===
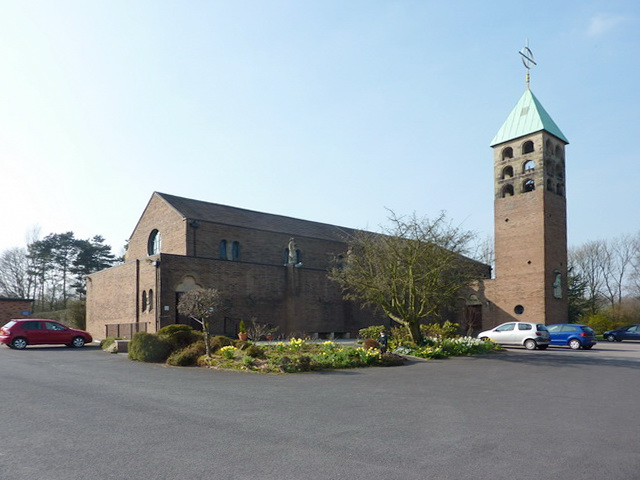
St Theresa's Catholic Church.

The Roman Catholic parish church of St Theresa, College Road, is a fine building of 1955 by F. X. Velarde, "one of the most unusual and innovative Catholic architects of the twentieth century".

A Catholic seminary, St Joseph's College, used for training Catholic priests, was once based in Up Holland. The college closed down in 1987 after over 150 years of serving the northern Catholic dioceses of England, and its extensive buildings are now derelict.

== Literature ==
Up Holland and its surrounding countryside its described in the English novel The War Hero by Michael Lieber.

== Notable people ==
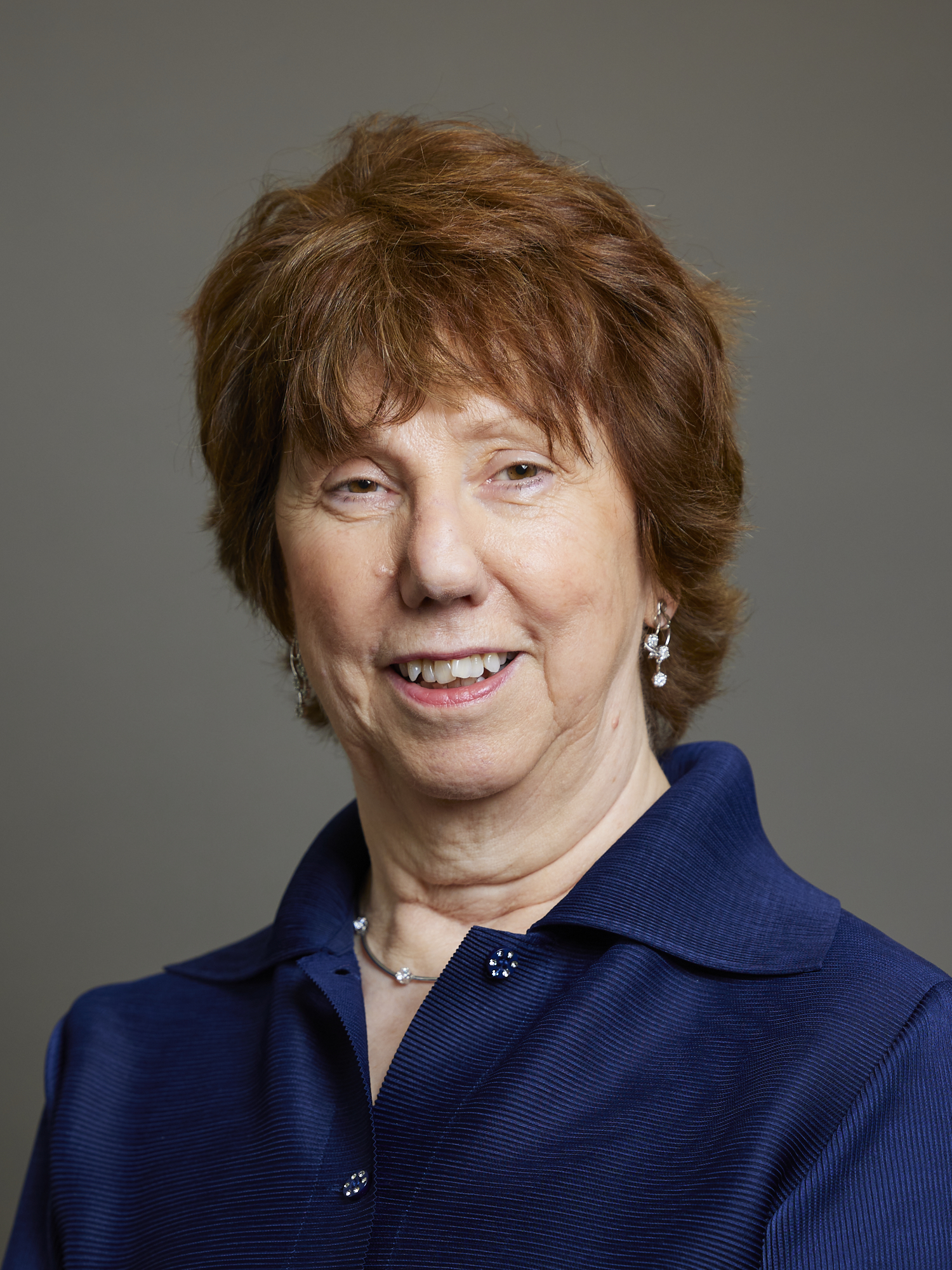
Baroness Ashton of Upholland, 2024

- Robert de Holland, 1st Baron Holand (ca.1283–1328), an English nobleman
- John Thulis (ca.1568–1616), an English Roman Catholic priest; beatified in 1987.
- Richard James Arthur Berry (1867–1962), surgeon, anatomist and eugenicist; worked in Australia.
- Dorothy Wilkinson (1883-1947), Australian head teacher
- Ted Ray (1905–1977), comedian; his radio programme Ray's a Laugh ran for 12 years.
- John C. Wells (born 1939), phonetician, president of the International Phonetic Association, 2003 / 2007.
- Ian Bleasdale (born 1950), an English actor and TV presenter.
- Charles Bamforth (born 1952) brewing expert and football author.
- Catherine Ashton (born 1956), a British Labour politician and life peer (Baroness Ashton of Upholland), was the EU's High Representative for Foreign Affairs and Security Policy from 2009 to 2014.
- Richard Ashcroft (born 1971), an English musician, singer, and songwriter with The Verve.

== Gallery ==
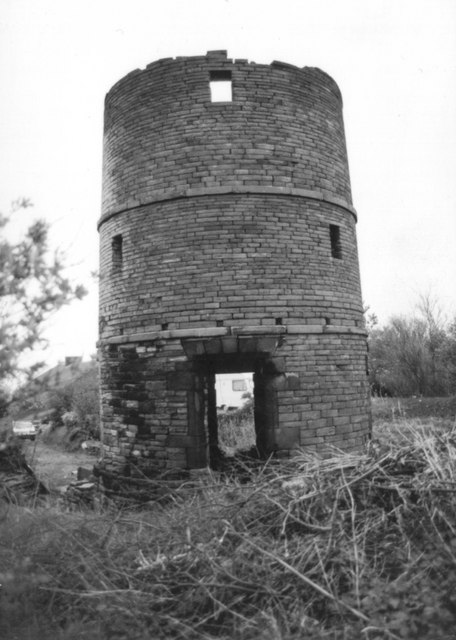
Up Holland Windmill

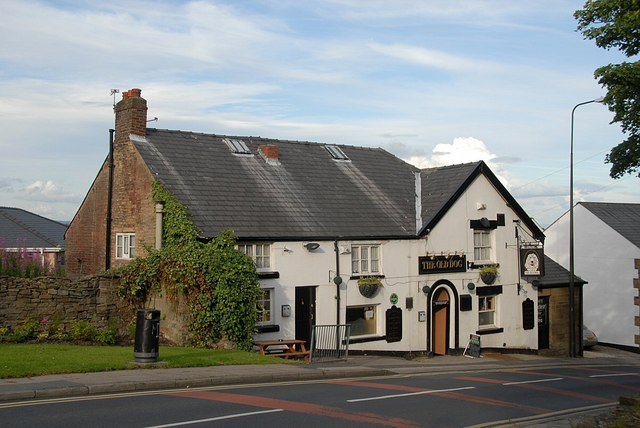
The Old Dog pub (formerly The Talbot, now a private residence)

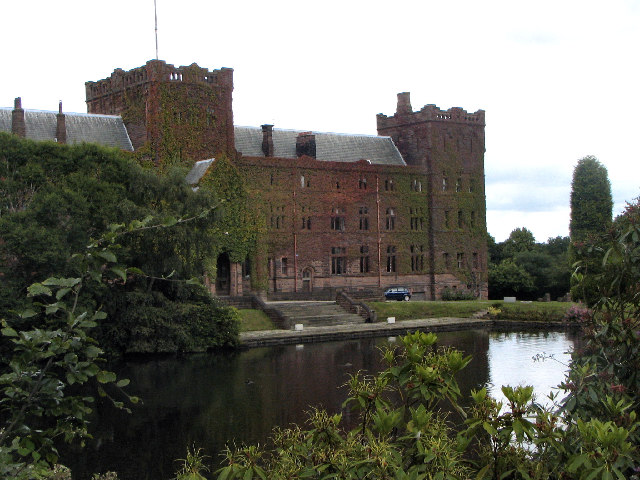
St Joseph’s College.

== See also ==
- Listed buildings in Up Holland
- Up Holland High School
