= The War Hero =

2018 novel by Michael Lieber

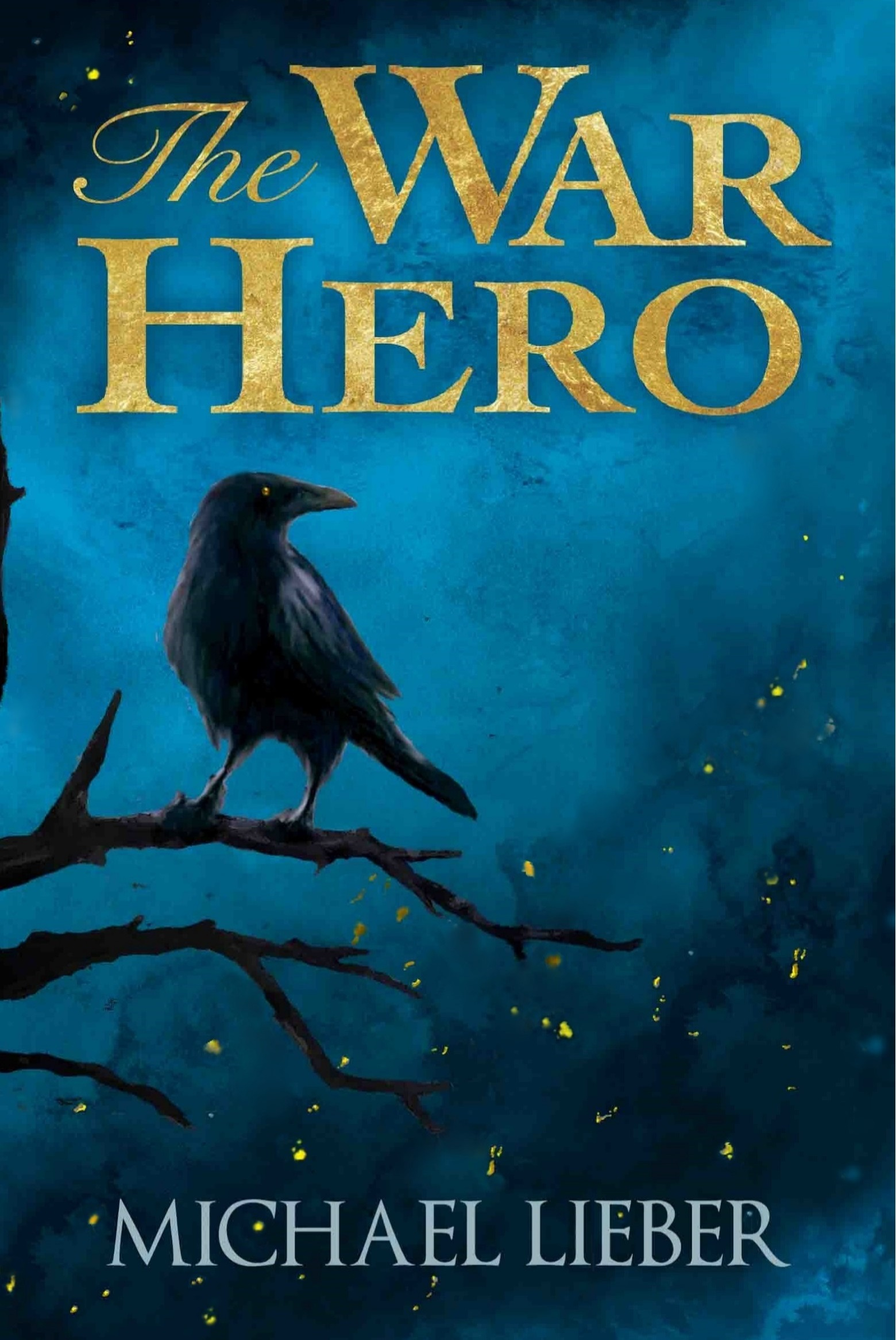
- First edition
- Author: Michael Lieber
- Language: English
- Genre: Allegory, Literary Fiction
- Publisher: British Cultural
- Publication date: 13 December 2018
- Publication place: United Kingdom
- Pages: 280 (Paperback)
- ISBN: 1-5272-4519-5 (Hardcover); ISBN 1-5272-3346-4 (Paperback)

The War Hero is a novel written by Michael Lieber.

== Background ==
The War Hero features many rural areas drawn from travels around Britain, Some of the locations used to describe the English countryside in the novel include Aylesbury Vale and Up Holland.

== Plot ==
The novel follows a sixty-five-year-old man on his birthday (Mr. Lidman), who is throwing a party at his cottage in the countryside. Among the guests are his Daughter (Marian) and her three friends (Ethel, Margo and Ben), Lidman's friend (Larry) from the NCA (National Coin Association), Lidman's next door neighbor (Mrs. Betrage), and a mysterious stranger who everyone assumes is a plus-one of one of the guests. When eventually confronted in private by Lidman, the stranger explains he has been hired to murder him, but makes a deal, allowing Lidman to enjoy his birthday party till the end of the night, the novel continues as a battle of wits between the two men.
