= Vas Blackwood =

British actor from London

- Born: Vasta Roy Blackwood; 19 October 1962 (age 64); London, England
- Occupation: Actor
- Years active: 1981–present
- Relatives: Richard Blackwood (cousin)

Vasta Roy "Vas" Blackwood (born 19 October 1962) is a British actor.

Blackwood played Lenny Henry's sidekick Winston Churchill in The Lenny Henry Show (1987) and David Sinclair in Casualty (1996–97). Since playing Rory Breaker in the hit film Lock, Stock and Two Smoking Barrels (1998), he has had a number of film roles, including Mean Machine (2001), 9 Dead Gay Guys (2002) and Creep (2004). In 2005, he appeared in A Bear's Tail, a spin-off of Bo' Selecta!. He also made an appearance as Lennox Gilbey in Only Fools and Horses. He also played main character Dexter in Spatz.

In 2008 he did voiceover work on the video game Fable II.

Blackwood was founder of virtual online blog Vastaman.com, which is now defunct but the site is still active. His cousin is the media personality Richard Blackwood.

== Filmography ==
=== Television ===
Year	Title	Role	Notes
1981	Prisoners of Conscience	Boy	Episode: "Nelson Mandela"
1982	Crown Court	Noel Brown	3 episodes
1983	Angels	Kelvin	Episode: #9.12
1984	Annika	Alan	2 episodes
1984	Arthur's Hallowed Ground	Henry	Television film
1985	Girls on Top	Mikey	Episode: "Skankin'"
1986	Only Fools and Horses	Lennox Gilbey aka The Shadow	Episode: "The Longest Night"
1986	Room at the Bottom	Office Boy	2 episodes
1986	Scene	Caesar	Episode: "To Turn a Blind Eye"
1986–1997	Casualty	Various	5 episodes
1987–1988	The Lenny Henry Show	Winston	12 episodes
1988	Dramarama	Rick	Episode: "Just a Normal Girl"
1988	Blind Justice	Henry	Episode: "Crime and Punishment"
1989	The Bill	Leon Davis	Episode: "The Visit"
1989	In Sickness and in Health	Pele	4 episodes
1990	French and Saunders	Jazza	Episode: "Casting Agency"
1990	Tygo Road	Gary	6 episodes
1990–1992	Spatz	Dexter Williams	33 episodes
1994	Hale and Pace		Episode: #7.1
1995	Crown Prosecutor	Marcus Hooper	Episode: #1.5
1996	The Bill	Tyrone Lee	Episode: "Reminders"
1996	Thief Takers		Episode: "Remember Me"
1998	Babymother	Caesar	Television film
2002	Fun at the Funeral Parlour	Coltrane Benz	Episode: "The Balls of Doom"
2003	Rehab	Cutlass	Television film
2007–2008	My Spy Family	Des	25 episodes
2008	Me and Mi Kru	Mr. Weatherburn	
2010	Me & Mi Kru	Mr. Weddy	
2015	Venus vs. Mars	Victor	2 episodes
2016	BBC Comedy Feeds	Coach	Episode: "JPD"
2018	Down the Caravan	Black Harry	Television film
2018	Joe All Alone	Otis	2 episodes

=== Film ===
Year	Title	Role	Notes
1990	Tight Trousers	Roddy	Short film
1998	Lock, Stock and Two Smoking Barrels	Rory Breaker	
2001	Mean Machine	Massive	
2002	The Escapist	Vin	
2002	9 Dead Gay Guys	Donkey-Dick Dark	
2003	One Love	Scarface	
2003	The Trouble with Men and Women	Travis	
2004	Creep	George	
2006	Heartbreak Hotel	Cab Driver	
2006	The Battersea Ripper		
2006	Rollin' with the Nines	Finny	
2008	Daylight Robbery	Lucky	
2011	Mercenaries	Zac	
2012	Offender	Detective Boaz	
2012	All God's Children	Mark	
2013	It's a Lot	PC Declan	
2013	White Collar Hooligan 2: England Away	The Pro	
2013	Essex Boys Retribution	The Lawyer	
2014	The Guvnors	Bill	
2014	White Collar Hooligan 3	The Pro	
2014	Cryptic	Meat	
2014	The Turtle and the Sea	Tom	
2015	N.O.L.A. Circus	Marvin	
2016	The Comedian's Guide to Survival	Dustin Langer	
2016	We Still Steal the Old Way	David	
2016	LOAK		Short film
2017	A Room to Die For	Detective McQueen	
2017	Fanged Up	Shifty	
2017	Amoc	Mr. Benjamin	
2018	Two Graves	Neville	
2018	King of Crime	Mr. Mustaffa	
2019	Red Rage	Father Barry Clifton	
2020	Next Door	Harry	
2020	The Loss Adjustor	The Pawnbroker	
2020	Original Gangster	Bobby Bravo	
2020	The Gift Musical	Abanaza	
2023	Hitmen	Paul Ali Rahman	
2023	The Abomination	Hercules	
2023	Sumotherhood	PC Ian	
2023	Longtails	The Cleaner	
2026	The Holiday Hitman	Reggie	

=== Animation ===
Year	Title	Role	Notes
2016–2019	Thunderbirds Are Go	Pirate Reece	3 episodes

=== Video games ===
Year	Title	Role	Notes
2008	Fable II	Various	Voice
