= 2026 Brooklyn FC season =

2026 Brooklyn FC men's season

Brooklyn FC
2026 season
- Head coach: Marlon LeBlanc
- Stadium: Maimonides Park
- USL Championship: Conference: 12th Overall: 24th
- USL Cup: Group stage
- Top goalscorer: League: Markus Anderson (6); All: Juan Carlos Obregón Jr. (7)
- Highest home attendance: 4,500 (March 8, against Indy Eleven)
- Lowest home attendance: 628 (August 21, against Sacramento Republic FC)
- Average home league attendance: 2,021
Home colors	Away colors
- All statistics correct as of November 14, 2026.

The 2026 Brooklyn FC season was the men's team's inaugural season as a professional soccer team, competing in the USL Championship, the second division of American soccer.

== Roster and staff ==
=== Roster ===
As of September 14, 2026

Note: Flags indicate national team as defined under FIFA eligibility rules; some limited exceptions apply. Players may hold more than one non-FIFA nationality.

No.	Pos.	Nation	Player
1	GK	CZE	Jassem Koleilat
2	DF	USA	Leo Duru (on loan from Blackburn Rovers)
3	DF	RWA	Phanuel Kavita
4	DF	USA	Ramiz Hamouda
5	DF	USA	Keegan Hughes (on loan from New England Revolution)
6	MF	AUS	Sam McIllhatton
8	MF	NCA	Kadeem Cole
9	FW	HAI	Ronaldo Damus
11	DF	USA	Dawson McCartney
12	GK	USA	Trevor McMullen
14	MF	ENG	Samuel Shashoua
15	FW	CAN	Tyler Pasher

No.	Pos.	Nation	Player
16	MF	JAM	Peter-Lee Vassell
17	FW	JAM	Romario Williams
18	MF	GHA	Seth Antwi
19	MF	USA	Gevork Diarbian
20	DF	GRN	A. J. Paterson
21	FW	URU	Sebastian Tregarthen
23	FW	USA	Sebastian Saucedo
26	DF	ANT	Amir Daley
27	DF	USA	Bryce Washington
77	DF	JAM	Nico Brown
81	FW	USA	Serge Ngoma (on loan from New York Red Bulls)

== Competitions ==
=== Regular season standings ===
Pos	Team	Pld	W	L	T	GF	GA	GD	Pts
9	Indy Eleven	30	9	14	7	35	41	−6	34
10	Birmingham Legion FC	30	6	12	12	40	46	−6	30
11	Loudoun United FC	30	6	11	13	40	46	−6	31
12	Brooklyn FC	30	5	19	6	34	63	−29	21
13	Sporting Club Jacksonville	30	3	22	5	32	78	−46	14

Updated to match(es) played on October 24, 2026. Source: USL Championship Standings
Rules for classification: 1) total wins against conference opponents; 2) goal differential against conference opponents; 3) goals scored against conference opponents; 4) head-to-head points against conference opponents; 5) points per game against conference opponents; 6) points per game against non-conference opponents; 7) fewest disciplinary points; 8) coin toss or drawing of lots

=== Matches ===
On December 16, 2025, the USL Championship released the schedule for all 25 teams for both the regular season and the USL Cup.

All times are in Eastern Time.

==== March ====
March 8 1	Brooklyn FC	1–0	Indy Eleven	Brooklyn, New York
3:30 PM	Obregón 26' (pen.)	Report		Stadium: Maimonides Park; Attendance: 4,500; Referee: Jeremy Scheer

March 14 2	Detroit City FC	3–0	Brooklyn FC	Hamtramck, Michigan
4:00 PM	Smith 3', 32'; Egbuchulam 85'	Report		Stadium: Keyworth Stadium; Attendance: 5,559; Referee: Rodrigo Albuquerque

March 21 3	Brooklyn FC	1–2	Hartford Athletic	Brooklyn, New York
7:00 PM	Anderson 62'	Report	Williams 18'; Coffey 40'	Stadium: Maimonides Park; Attendance: 2,257; Referee: Thomas Snyder

March 25 4	Lexington SC	3–0	Brooklyn FC	Lexington, Kentucky
7:00 PM	Molloy 74'; Ferri 84'; Henry-Scott 90+1'	Report		Stadium: Lexington SC Stadium; Attendance: 3,303; Referee: Elvis Osmanovic

March 28 5	Brooklyn FC	0–1	Louisville City FC	Brooklyn, New York
7:30 PM		Report	Vancaeyezeele 60' (o.g.)	Stadium: Maimonides Park; Attendance: 1,776; Referee: Muhammad Hassan

==== April ====
April 11 6	Brooklyn FC	3–0	Charleston Battery	Brooklyn, New York
7:00 PM	Servania 9'; Stojanovic 32'; Anderson 61'	Report		Stadium: Maimonides Park; Attendance: 2,736; Referee: Brad Jensen

April 21 7	Brooklyn FC	1–1	Sacramento Republic FC	Brooklyn, New York
7:00 PM	Anderson 27'; Alves (yellow card) 61' (yellow-red card) 90+5'	Report	Benítez 90+6' (pen.)	Stadium: Maimonides Park; Attendance: 628; Referee: John Matto

==== May ====
May 2 8	Miami FC	3–2	Brooklyn FC	Miami, Florida
7:00 PM	Burns 35' (o.g.); Vancaeyezeele 51' (o.g.); Locadia 71'	Report	Anderson 37'; Stojanovic 75'	Stadium: Pitbull Stadium; Attendance: 1,439; Referee: Jorge Escobar

May 9 9	Brooklyn FC	0–1	Loudoun United FC	Brooklyn, New York
7:00 PM		Report	Úlfarsson 26'	Stadium: Maimonides Park; Attendance: 1,533; Referee: John Griggs

May 23 10	Rhode Island FC	4–1	Brooklyn FC	Pawtucket, Rhode Island
7:30 PM	Bacharach (yellow card) 17'; J. Williams (yellow card) 30' (goal) 82', 85'; Kwizera 39', 72'; Herivaux (yellow card) 75'; Holstad (yellow card) 80'; Vegas (yellow card) 81'	Report	Alves (yellow card) 46'; Olney 62'; McNamara (yellow card) 90+3'	Stadium: Centreville Bank Stadium; Attendance: 6,506; Referee: Joshua Encarnación

May 30 11	Sporting Club Jacksonville	2–2	Brooklyn FC	Jacksonville, Florida
7:00 PM	Rose 37'; Pedder 55'	Report	Mangione 8'; Stojanovic 23'	Stadium: Hodges Stadium; Attendance: 820; Referee: Benjamin Meyer
Note: Match abandoned in the 74th minute due to inclement weather.

==== June ====
June 13 12	Louisville City FC	2–2	Brooklyn FC	Louisville, Kentucky
8:00 PM	Donovan 30'; Serrano Lopez 89'	Report	Anderson 4', (red card) 90+7'; Stojanovic 55'	Stadium: Lynn Family Stadium; Attendance: 8,672; Referee: Erick Lezama

June 17 13	Indy Eleven	–	Brooklyn FC	Indianapolis, Indiana
7:00 PM		Report		Stadium: Carroll Stadium
Note: Postponed to a later date due to inclement weather.

June 20 14	Brooklyn FC	0–2	Tampa Bay Rowdies	Brooklyn, New York
7:00 PM		Report	Cicerone 29'; Myers 33' (pen.)	Stadium: Maimonides Park; Attendance: 1,356; Referee: Sergii Boiko

==== July ====
July 4 15	Pittsburgh Riverhounds SC	0–2	Brooklyn FC	Pittsburgh, Pennsylvania
7:00 PM	Dikwa (red card) 76'	Report	Olney 49'; Kante 90+3'; Stojanovic (yellow card) 45+1' (yellow-red card) 76'	Stadium: Highmark Stadium; Attendance: 6,376; Referee: Amin Hadzic

July 18 16	Sporting Club Jacksonville	2–2	Brooklyn FC	Jacksonville, Florida
7:00 PM	Jääskeläinen 3'; Al-Qaq 9'	Report	Obregón 57'; McNamara 75' (pen.)	Stadium: Hodges Stadium; Attendance: 1,193; Referee: Nabil Bensalah

July 25 17	Brooklyn FC	0–1	San Antonio FC	Brooklyn, New York
7:00 PM		Report	Parano 34'	Stadium: Maimonides Park; Attendance: 1,907; Referee: Drew Klemp

==== August ====
August 1 18	Charleston Battery	5–0	Brooklyn FC	Mt. Pleasant, South Carolina
7:00 PM	Cabrera 1'; Foster 43'; Kissiedou 54'; Berry 57'; Ycaza 90'; Kissiedou (red card) 79'	Report	McNamara (red card) 79'	Stadium: Patriots Point Soccer Complex; Attendance: 4,432; Referee: Joe Surgan

August 8 19	Brooklyn FC	–	Birmingham Legion FC	Brooklyn, New York
7:00 PM		Report		Stadium: Maimonides Park
Note: Match postponed due to inclement weather.

August 15 20	Las Vegas Lights FC	2–1	Brooklyn FC	Las Vegas, Nevada
10:30 PM	Anderson 68'; Rodriguez 87'	Report	Obregón Jr. 4'	Stadium: Cashman Field; Referee: Servando Berna Rico

August 22 21	Brooklyn FC	0–1	Pittsburgh Riverhounds SC	Brooklyn, New York
7:00 PM		Report	Bassett 83'	Stadium: Maimonides Park; Attendance: 965; Referee: Calin Radosav

August 29 22	Brooklyn FC	4–1	Sporting Club Jacksonville	Brooklyn, New York
7:00 PM	Mangione 8', 27'; Anderson 35'; Olney 78'	Report	Sadlier 71'	Stadium: Maimonides Park; Referee: Rodrigo Albuquerque

==== September ====
September 5 23	Tampa Bay Rowdies	2–0	Brooklyn FC	St. Petersburg, Florida
7:30 PM	Pérez 24'; Conway 90+2'	Report		Stadium: Al Lang Stadium; Referee: Jeremy Scheer

September 12 24	Brooklyn FC	1–1	Miami FC	Brooklyn, New York
7:00 PM	Ndiaye 81' (o.g.)	Report	Rocha 70'	Stadium: Maimonides Park; Attendance: 2,474; Referee: Deny Kulasinac

September 19 25	Brooklyn FC	2–2	FC Tulsa	Brooklyn, New York
7:00 PM	Alves (red card) 17'; Kanté 64'; McNamara 90+1' (pen.)	Report	Eisner 29'; Pierre 37'	Stadium: Maimonides Park

September 23 26	Birmingham Legion FC	4–0	Brooklyn FC	Birmingham, Alabama
12:00 PM	Vassell 14'; Ngoma 48'; Saucedo 84' (pen.); Damus 90+2'	Report		Stadium: Protective Stadium; Attendance: 4,350; Referee: Amin Hadzic

September 30 27	Brooklyn FC	1–3	Detroit City FC	Brooklyn, New York
7:00 PM	McNamara 70' (pen.)	Report	Smith 53'; Montgomery 72'; Hernandez-Foster 90+3'	Stadium: Maimonides Park; Attendance: 891; Referee: Atahan Yaya

==== October ====
October 3 28	Brooklyn FC	1–3	Rhode Island FC	Brooklyn, New York
7:00 PM	Pinto 85'	Report	Shapiro-Thompson 18'; Yao 21'; Scardina 55'	Stadium: Maimonides Park; Attendance: 1,732; Referee: Carlos Rodriguez

October 17 29	Hartford Athletic	2–3	Brooklyn FC	Hartford, Connecticut
7:00 PM	Adedokun 21'; Anaku 57'	Report	Fontana (yellow card) 43' (yellow-red card) 73'; Kanté 55'; Klein 63'; Olney 79'	Stadium: Trinity Health Stadium; Referee: Nicholas Strednak

October 21 19	Brooklyn FC	1–2	Birmingham Legion FC	Brooklyn, New York
6:30 PM	Pinto 7'	Report	Tregarthen 18', 63'	Stadium: Maimonides Park; Attendance: 2,112; Referee: Steven Cardozo
Note: Rescheduled match from August 8

October 24 30	Loudoun United FC	4–3	Brooklyn FC	Leesburg, Virginia
5:00 PM	Zouhir 3'; Aboukoura 47'; Murphy 65'; Butts 88'	Report	Obregón 17', 23' (pen.); Okiyoshi 45+3'	Stadium: Segra Field; Attendance: 2,950; Referee: José Lara

=== USL Cup ===
Brooklyn FC participated in the third edition of the USL Cup, and the second edition to feature teams from both the USL Championship and League One.

==== Standings ====
Pos	Lg	Team	Pld	W	PKW	PKL	L	GF	GA	GD	Pts	Qualification
1	USLC	Hartford Athletic	4	3	0	1	0	8	2	+6	10	Advance to knockout stage
2	USLC	Rhode Island FC	4	1	2	0	1	5	3	+2	7	
3	USLC	Brooklyn FC	4	2	0	1	1	9	4	+5	7	
4	USL1	Portland Hearts of Pine	4	1	1	1	1	6	9	−3	6	
5	USL1	New York Cosmos	4	1	0	1	2	5	10	−5	4	

==== Group stage ====
April 25	New York Cosmos	0–3	Brooklyn FC	Paterson, New Jersey
2:00 PM		Report	Obregón 35'; Alves 39'; Kanté 43'	Stadium: Hinchliffe Stadium; Attendance: 1,040; Referee: Lauren Aldrich

May 16	Brooklyn FC	0–2	Hartford Athletic	Brooklyn, New York
7:00 PM		Report	Careaga 63'; Ngalina 86'	Stadium: Maimonides Park; Attendance: 1,259; Referee: Luis Arroyo

June 7	Brooklyn FC	5–1	Portland Hearts of Pine	Brooklyn, New York
3:00 p.m.	Anderson 8', 70'; Stojanovic 36', 45+2'; Vancaeyezeele 55'	Report	Camara 19'	Stadium: Maimonides Park; Attendance: 1,977; Referee: Matthew Corrigan

July 11	Rhode Island FC	1–1 (4–3 p)	Brooklyn FC	Pawtucket, Rhode Island
7:30 p.m.	Rodríguez 18'	Report	Obregón 45+4'	Stadium: Centreville Bank Stadium; Attendance: 7,030; Referee: Guido Gonzales Jr.
	Penalties
	Scardina (penalty scored); Shapiro-Thompson (penalty scored); Afonso (penalty scored); Koke Vegas (penalty scored)		(penalty scored) McNamara; (penalty scored) Stojanovic; (penalty scored) McLaughlin; (penalty missed) Obregón
