= 2026 Rhode Island FC season =

Rhode Island FC
2026 season
- Head coach: Khano Smith
- Stadium: Centreville Bank Stadium, Pawtucket, Rhode Island
- USL Championship: Eastern Conference: 7th place
- U.S. Open Cup: Round of 32
- USL Cup: 2nd place, Group 5
- USL Championship Playoffs: Eastern Conference Quarterfinals
- Top goalscorer: League: JJ Williams (8); All: JJ Williams (11)
- Highest home attendance: 10,606 (August 22)
- Lowest home attendance: 1,156 (March 17)
- Average home league attendance: 8,096
- Biggest win: RI 4–0 FAI (March 17); RI 4–0 CHS (April 22)
- Biggest defeat: LOU 4–2 RI (March 21)
Home colors	Away colors
- All statistics correct as of 2:00, October 31, 2026 (UTC).

The 2026 Rhode Island FC season was the third season for Rhode Island FC, and their third in the USL Championship, the second tier of professional soccer in the United States.

As a member of the USL Championship, RIFC played an unbalanced 30-game regular season schedule, plus four USL Cup games. They played their Eastern Conference opponents twice, each home and away, and six of the teams in the Western Conference, three home and three away. The top eight teams in each conference advanced to the playoffs. Rhode Island finished 7th in the conference, and were eliminated from the playoffs, losing a penalty-kick shootout at the end of their first-round game.

In the group stage of the 2026 USL Cup, Rhode Island finished second in Group 5. Their 7-point performance was not enough to earn a wild-card spot in the cup's quarterfinal round.

RIFC entered in the first round of the 2026 U.S. Open Cup. They were victorious in their first two games, before losing a penalty-kick shootout in their Round of 32 game.

== Preseason ==
RIFC's preseason included a local training camp in Rhode Island, followed by extended training in Florida at IMG Academy. RIFC played closed-door scrimmages against New England Revolution II, Sporting Club Jacksonville, Sarasota Paradise, Philadelphia Union II, and Hartford Athletic. An open exhibition game against Brooklyn FC was canceled due to after-effects of the Blizzard of '26, which left 30 inches of snow in Pawtucket.

The team's season-opening game against Loudoun United FC, scheduled for March 7, was also postponed due to the blizzard. The game was moved to mid-October.

== Player movement ==
=== In ===
No.	Pos.	Player	Transferred from	Fee/notes	Date	Source
8	FW	(Brazil) Leo Afonso	(United States) Atlanta United	Free transfer	January 8, 2026	
22	DF	(United States) Nick Scardina	(United States) Charlotte FC	Free transfer	January 9, 2026	
29	GK	(United States) Jacob Castro	(United States) Tacoma Defiance	Free transfer	January 13, 2026	
10	MF	(Argentina) Agustín Rodríguez	(Argentina) Club Atlético Lanús	Loan	January 14, 2026	
20	FW	(United States) Jamin Gogo Peters	(United States) Brown University	Free transfer	February 16, 2026	
14	FW	(United States) Logan Dorsey	(United States) Minnesota United FC 2	Loan	February 25, 2026	
25	DF	(United States) CJ Williams	(United States) Boston College	Free transfer	March 3, 2026	
18	FW	(Netherlands) Osman Foyo	(England) AFC Wimbledon	Undisclosed fee	July 23, 2026	
14	FW	(Japan) Yutaro Tsukada	(United States) Orlando City SC	Loan	July 30, 2026	
16	MF	(United States) Eric Klein	(United States) New England Revolution	Loan	August 14, 2026	
37	FW	(United States) Stas Korzeniowski	(United States) Philadelphia Union	Loan	August 27, 2026	
28	DF	(Jamaica) Cai McLean	(United States) Inter Miami CF Academy	Free transfer	September 16, 2026	
27	FW	(Haiti) Nikolai Pierre	(United States) Orlando City SC Academy	Free transfer	September 16, 2026	
30	MF	(United States) Kevin Medina	(United States) Inter Miami CF Academy	Free transfer USL Academy contract	September 17, 2026	
31	GK	(United States) Nate DiLoreto	(United States) Sacred Heart University	Free transfer 25-day contract	September 30, 2026	

=== Out ===
Date	Pos.	Player	Transaction	Details	New Club	Ref.
December 19, 2025	MF	(United States) Maxi Rodriguez	Transfer	Undisclosed fee	(United States) Detroit City FC	
January 9, 2026	FW	(Cameroon) Albert Dikwa	Transfer	Undisclosed fee	(United States) Pittsburgh Riverhounds SC	
January 16, 2026	DF	(Zambia) Aimé Mabika	Release	Mutual consent		
February 14, 2026	FW	(Cameroon) Mathieu Ndongo	Transfer	Undisclosed fee	(United States) Miami FC	
June 5, 2026	FW	(United States) Logan Dorsey	Recall of loan		(United States) Minnesota United FC (Note: Dorsey was immediately loaned out to FC Tulsa.)	
July 27, 2026	MF	(United States) Clay Holstad	Loan	Option to buy	(United States) FC Dallas	
August 25, 2026	FW	(United States) JJ Williams	Transfer	Undisclosed "club-record" fee	(Scotland) Heart of Midlothian FC	
August 29, 2026	DF	(Senegal) Hamady Diop	Transfer	Undisclosed fee	(United States) Birmingham Legion FC	

=== Roster ===
As of September 30, 2026

Note: Flags indicate national team as defined under FIFA eligibility rules; some limited exceptions apply. Players may hold more than one non-FIFA nationality.

No.	Pos.	Nation	Player
1	GK	ESP	Koke Vegas
2	DF	COL	Dani Rovira
3	DF	USA	Aldair Sanchez
4	DF	ESP	Hugo Bacharach
5	DF	USA	Grant Stoneman
7	MF	JAM	Dwayne Atkinson
8	FW	BRA	Leo Afonso
10	MF	ARG	Agustín Rodríguez (on loan from Lanús)
11	FW	USA	Noah Fuson
13	GK	USA	Will Meyer
14	FW	JPN	Yutaro Tsukada (on loan from Orlando City)
15	DF	CUB	Frank Nodarse
16	MF	USA	Eric Klein (on loan from New England Revolution)
17	MF	RWA	Jojea Kwizera

No.	Pos.	Nation	Player
18	FW	NED	Osman Foyo
19	MF	USA	Kevin Vang
20	FW	USA	Jamin Gogo Peters
21	MF	HAI	Zachary Herivaux
22	DF	USA	Nick Scardina
24	DF	CAN	Karifa Yao
25	DF	USA	CJ Williams
27	DF	HAI	Nikolai Pierre
28	FW	JAM	Cai McLean
29	GK	USA	Jacob Castro
30	MF	USA	Kevin Medina (USL Academy contract)
31	GK	USA	Nate DiLoreto
37	FW	USA	Stas Korzeniowski (on loan from Philadelphia Union)
77	MF	USA	Amos Shapiro-Thompson

=== Out on loan ===
Note: Flags indicate national team as defined under FIFA eligibility rules; some limited exceptions apply. Players may hold more than one non-FIFA nationality.

No.	Pos.	Nation	Player
12	MF	USA	Clay Holstad (on loan to FC Dallas)

== Competitions ==
=== Preseason Friendlies ===
As they did in their first two seasons, RIFC held a limited training camp in Rhode Island, before heading to IMG Academy in Bradenton, Florida for preseason training. The team announced closed-door scrimmages against teams from MLS Next Pro and both USL leagues, ahead of the start of the regular season. They also played an unannounced preseason friendly against the New England Revolution.

January 28	New England Revolution II	5–4	Rhode Island FC	Weymouth, MA
	Da 29'; Buck 36' (pen.); George 48'; Trialist 80'; Trialist 85'	Report	Not Reported	Stadium: Union Point Sports Complex
Note: Closed-door scrimmage

February 1	Sporting Club Jacksonville	v	Rhode Island FC	Bradenton, FL
		Report		Stadium: IMG Academy
Note: Closed-door scrimmage. Though RIFC posted pictures to social media, no results were officially released by either team.

February 7	Sarasota Paradise	1–2	Rhode Island FC	Bradenton, FL
	O'Dwyer	Report	Not reported	Stadium: IMG Academy
Note: Closed-door scrimmage. No box score was posted, but a goal was scored by Chandler O'Dwyer.

February 12	Philadelphia Union II	v	Rhode Island FC	Bradenton, FL
				Stadium: IMG Academy
Note: Closed-door scrimmage.

February 20	Hartford Athletic	v	Rhode Island FC	Hartford, CT

February 28	Rhode Island FC	v	Brooklyn FC	Pawtucket, RI
				Stadium: Centreville Bank Stadium
Note: Game canceled due to the Blizzard of '26

=== USL Championship ===
==== Eastern Conference ====
Pos	Team	Pld	W	L	T	GF	GA	GD	Pts	Qualification
1	Tampa Bay Rowdies (S)	30	18	5	7	52	26	+26	61	Playoffs
2	Charleston Battery	30	16	9	5	56	35	+21	53	Playoffs
3	Detroit City FC	30	14	7	9	34	21	+13	51	Playoffs
4	Louisville City FC	30	13	9	8	51	43	+8	47	Playoffs
5	Pittsburgh Riverhounds SC	30	13	11	6	33	30	+3	45	Playoffs
6	Hartford Athletic	30	10	7	13	35	33	+2	43	Playoffs
7	Rhode Island FC	30	12	12	6	42	33	+9	42	Playoffs
8	Miami FC	30	9	12	9	39	49	−10	36	Playoffs
9	Indy Eleven	30	9	14	7	35	41	−6	34	
10	Birmingham Legion FC	30	6	12	12	40	46	−6	30	
11	Loudoun United FC	30	6	11	13	40	46	−6	31	
12	Brooklyn FC	30	5	19	6	34	63	−29	21	
13	Sporting Club Jacksonville	30	3	22	5	32	78	−46	14	

Updated to match(es) played on October 24, 2026. Source: USL Championship Standings
Rules for classification: 1) total wins against conference opponents; 2) goal differential against conference opponents; 3) goals scored against conference opponents; 4) head-to-head points against conference opponents; 5) points per game against conference opponents; 6) points per game against non-conference opponents; 7) fewest disciplinary points; 8) coin toss or drawing of lots
(S) Players' Shield winner

==== Results summary ====
Overall								Home						Away					
Pld	W	D	L	GF	GA	GD	Pts	W	D	L	GF	GA	GD	W	D	L	GF	GA	GD
30	12	6	12	42	33	+9	42	7	6	2	23	12	+11	5	0	10	19	21	−2

Last updated: October 24, 2026.
Source: Match reports

Round	1	2	3	4	5	6	7	8	9	10	11	12	13	14	15	16	17	18	19	20	21	22	23	24	25	26	27	28	29	30
Stadium	H	A	A	H	A	H	H	H	H	A	A	H	A	H	A	A	H	A	H	A	H	A	H	A	H	A	A	H	H	A
Result	D	L	L	D	W	W	L	D	W	L	W	D	L	W	W	L	W	L	W	L	D	W	L	L	W	W	L	W	D	L
Eastern Conference	8	10	10	12	10	9	10	10	9	9	9	9	9	8	6	7	6	7	7	7	8	7	8	8	7	6	7	5	6	7

Updated to match(es) played on October 24, 2026. Source: Match reports
A = Away; H = Home; W = Win; D = Draw; L = Loss

==== Regular season ====
March 7 n/a	Rhode Island FC	v	Loudoun United FC	Pawtucket, RI
2:30PM				Stadium: Centreville Bank Stadium
Note: Game postponed due to the Blizzard of '26.

March 14 1	Rhode Island FC	1–1	Sporting Club Jacksonville	Pawtucket, RI
4:00PM	Kwizera (yellow card) 33'; Dorsey 79'	Report	Jääskeläinen (yellow card) 30'; Rossiter (yellow card) 73' (yellow-red card) 88'; Pedder 84'	Stadium: Centreville Bank Stadium; Attendance: 6,758; Referee: Thomas Snyder

March 21 2	Louisville City FC	4–2	Rhode Island FC	Louisville, KY
4:00PM	Morris 23' (yellow card) 31'; Duncan 48'; Adams 76'; Dayes (yellow card) 89'; Wilson 90+2'	Report	Kwizera 21'; Afonso (yellow card) 37'; Holstad 56'; Yao (yellow card) 63'; J Williams (red card) 88'; Nodarse (yellow card) 89'; Bacharach (yellow card) 90+6'	Stadium: Lynn Family Stadium; Attendance: 8,121; Referee: Jeremy Scheer

March 28 3	Miami FC	2–1	Rhode Island FC	Miami, FL
7:00PM	Rocha 22'; Ndongo 50'; Rodriguez (yellow card) 68'; Tori (yellow card) 79'; Milesi (yellow card) 84'	Report	Bacharach (yellow card) 39' (yellow-red card) 80'; Atkinson 65'; Afonso (yellow card) 76'	Stadium: Pitbull Stadium; Attendance: 1,289; Referee: Luis Arroyo

April 4 4	Rhode Island FC	0–0	Detroit City FC	Pawtucket, RI
4:00PM	J. Williams (yellow card) 13'	Report	Diouf (yellow card) 54'; Diop (yellow card) 61'	Stadium: Centreville Bank Stadium; Attendance: 6,590; Referee: John Griggs

April 11 5	Lexington SC	1–3	Rhode Island FC	Lexington, KY
7:00PM	Burks (yellow card) 63'; Greene 85'; Ordoñez (yellow card) 90+1'	Report	Sanchez 22'; Kwizera 27'; Afonso 68'	Stadium: Lexington SC Stadium; Attendance: 4,577; Referee: Brandon Stevis

April 22 6	Rhode Island FC	4–0	Charleston Battery	Pawtucket, RI
7:30PM	J. Williams 51', 66'; Kwizera 61'; Atkinson 83' (pen.)	Report	Martínez (yellow card) 85'	Stadium: Centreville Bank Stadium; Attendance: 5,708; Referee: Elton Garcia

May 2 7	Rhode Island FC	1–3	Birmingham Legion FC	Pawtucket, RI
7:30PM	Afonso 17'; Yao (yellow card) 45+1'; Bacharach (yellow card) 47'; Kwizera (yellow card) 80'	Report	Tregarthen 3'; Kavita 48'; Damus 57'; Antwi (yellow card) 79'	Stadium: Centreville Bank Stadium; Attendance: 7,596; Referee: Nabil Bensalah

May 9 8	Rhode Island FC	1–1	Tampa Bay Rowdies	Pawtucket, RI
7:30PM	Bacharach (yellow card) 30'; Kwizera (yellow card) 62'; J. Williams 85'	Report	Schneider (yellow card) 21'; Dolabella 29' (yellow card) 90+4'; Ostrem (yellow card) 49'; Perez (yellow card) 62'; Micaletto (yellow card) 70'	Stadium: Centreville Bank Stadium; Attendance: 6,790; Referee: Rodrigo Albuquerque

May 23 9	Rhode Island FC	4–1	Brooklyn FC	Pawtucket, RI
7:30PM	Bacharach (yellow card) 17'; J. Williams (yellow card) 30' (goal) 82', 85'; Kwizera 39', 72'; Herivaux (yellow card) 75'; Holstad (yellow card) 80'; Vegas (yellow card) 81'	Report	Alves (yellow card) 46'; Olney 62'; McNamara (yellow card) 90+3'	Stadium: Centreville Bank Stadium; Attendance: 6,506; Referee: Joshua Encarnación

May 30 10	Indy Eleven	1–0	Rhode Island FC	Indianapolis, IN
7:00PM	Okello (yellow card) 15'; Rendón (yellow card) 36' (goal) 55'	Report	Shapiro-Thompson (yellow card) 8'; Holstad (yellow card) 56'	Stadium: Caroll Stadium; Attendance: 8,188; Referee: Thomas Snyder

June 13 11	Loudoun United FC	1–4	Rhode Island FC	Leesburg, VA
6:00PM	Erlandson (yellow card) 35'; Úlfarsson 58'; Ordóñez (yellow card) 67'; Akinyode (yellow card) 77'	Report	J. Williams 22'; Scardina 48'; Bacharach (yellow card) 63'; Afonso (yellow card) 68' (goal) 71'; Atkinson 89'	Stadium: Segra Field; Attendance: 1,500; Referee: Edson Carvajal

July 4 12	Rhode Island FC	1–1	Orange County SC	Pawtucket, RI
7:30PM	Holstad (yellow card) 9'; Rodríguez (yellow card) 20'; Bacharach 51' (yellow card) 61'	Report	Ciotta (yellow card) 39'; Tubbs (yellow card) 45+4'; Sylla 67'	Stadium: Centreville Bank Stadium; Attendance: 9,097; Referee: John Griggs

July 8 13	Sacramento Republic FC	2–1	Rhode Island FC	Sacramento, CA
10:30PM	K. Edwards 19'; Spaulding (yellow card) 26'; Malango 44'	Report	Bacharach 24'; Sanchez (yellow card) 51'	Stadium: Heart Health Park; Attendance: 8,436; Referee: Elvis Osmanovic

July 18 14	Rhode Island FC	1–0	Hartford Athletic	Pawtucket, RI
7:30PM	Stoneman (yellow card) 2'; Nodarse 20'; J. Williams (yellow card) 57'; Kwizera (yellow card) 72'	Report	Makangila (yellow card) 41'; Taofeek (yellow card) 45+2'	Stadium: Centreville Bank Stadium; Attendance: 10,199; Referee: Gerald Flores

July 25 15	Pittsburgh Riverhounds SC	0–1	Rhode Island FC	Pittsburgh, PA
7:00PM	Souza (yellow card) 72'	Report	Rodríguez (yellow card) 45'; J. Williams 62'	Stadium: F.N.B. Stadium; Attendance: 6,012; Referee: Abdou Ndiaye

August 2 16	Birmingham Legion FC	1–0	Rhode Island FC	Birmingham, AL
7:00PM	Damus 63'; Koleilat (yellow card) 85'	Report	Rovira (yellow card) 83'; Atkinson (yellow card) 90'	Stadium: Protective Stadium; Attendance: 3,253; Referee: Carlos Rodriguez
Note: Game postponed from August 1, due to weather conditions.

August 8 17	Rhode Island FC	2–0	Colorado Springs Switchbacks FC	Pawtucket, RI
7:30PM	Kwizera (yellow card) 9'; Nodarse (yellow card) 26'; Bacharach (yellow card) 41'; Tsukada (yellow card) 43' (goal) 69'; Sanchez (yellow card) 52'; Rodríguez (yellow card) 73'; J. Williams 90+2'	Report	Foster (yellow card) 72'; Masereka (yellow card) 73'	Stadium: Centreville Bank Stadium; Attendance: 9,502; Referee: Matthew Corrigan

August 15 18	Tampa Bay Rowdies	2–0	Rhode Island FC	St. Petersburg, FL
7:30PM	Conway (yellow card) 53'; Antley 61'; Schneider (yellow card) 90+1'; Perez 90+2'	Report	Bacharach (yellow card) 45+2'; Klein (yellow card) 77'	Stadium: Al Lang Stadium; Attendance: 4,947; Referee: Corbyn May

August 22 19	Rhode Island FC	3–1	Monterey Bay FC	Pawtucket, RI
7:30PM	Afonso 5'; Sanchez (yellow card) 25'; Bacharach 66'; Shapiro-Thompson (yellow card) 76'; Stoneman 83'; Klein (yellow card) 90'	Report	Lletget 16'; Farnsworth (yellow card) 22'; Otoya (yellow card) 42'; Elliot (yellow card) 59'; Barajas (yellow card) 77'; Leggett (yellow card) 90+2'	Stadium: Centreville Bank Stadium; Attendance: 10,606; Referee: Atahan Yaya

August 29 20	FC Tulsa	1–0	Rhode Island FC	Tulsa, OK
8:30PM	Kocevski 8'; Webber (yellow card) 25'; Ian (yellow card) 38'; ElMedkhar (yellow card) 74'; Pierre (yellow card) 87'; Dorsey (yellow card) 88'; Jacomen (yellow card) 90+3'	Report		Stadium: Oneok Field; Attendance: 4,540; Referee: Mark Verso

September 5 21	Rhode Island FC	1–1	Louisville City FC	Pawtucket, RI
7:30PM	Korzeniowski 48'; Kwizera (yellow card) 90+5'	Report	Totsch 18' (pen.) (yellow card) 63'; McFadden (yellow card) 50'; Huerman (yellow card) 51'; Davila (yellow card) 90+5'	Stadium: Centreville Bank Stadium; Attendance: 8,474; Referee: John Matto

September 12 22	Sporting Club Jacksonville	0–3	Rhode Island FC	Jacksonville, FL
8:15PM	Mota (yellow card) 88'	Report	Nodarse (yellow card) 30'; Tsukada 38'; Korzeniowski 63' (yellow card) 88'; Shapiro-Thompson (yellow card) 64'; Fuson (yellow card) 80'; Kwizera 90' (pen.)	Stadium: Hodges Stadium; Attendance: 1,320; Referee: Jorge Escobar

September 19 23	Rhode Island FC	1–2	Miami FC	Pawtucket, RI
7:30PM	Kwizera (yellow card) 29'; Yao 36'; Shapiro-Thompson (yellow card) 54'; Nodarse (yellow card) 56'; Fuson (yellow card) 66'	Report	Rocha 25'; Tori (yellow card) 39'; Tunbridge (yellow card) 53'; Milanés (yellow card) 69' (goal) 74'	Stadium: Centreville Bank Stadium; Attendance: 10,308; Referee: Gerald Flores

September 26 24	Charleston Battery	2–0	Rhode Island FC	Mount Pleasant, SC
7:00PM	Ycaza 77' (pen.), 84'	Report	Herivaux (yellow card) 41'; Sanchez (yellow card) 47'; Klein (yellow card) 50'; Vegas (red card) 81'	Stadium: Patriots Point Soccer Complex; Attendance: 4,599; Referee: Brandon Stevis

September 30 25	Rhode Island FC	1–0	Indy Eleven	Pawtucket, RI
7:30PM	Korzeniowski 23'; Yao (yellow card) 39'; Bacharach (yellow card) 77'; Afonso (yellow card) 83'	Report	Mitrano (yellow card) 63'; Quinn (yellow card) 77'	Stadium: Centreville Bank Stadium; Attendance: 6,463; Referee: Corbyn May

October 3 26	Brooklyn FC	1–3	Rhode Island FC	Brooklyn, NY
7:00PM	Alves (yellow card) 28'; Pinto 85'	Report	Shapiro-Thompson 18'; Yao 21'; Korzeniowski (yellow card) 42'; Tsukada (yellow card) 45+1'; Scardina 55'; Bacharach (yellow card) 57'	Stadium: Maimonides Park; Attendance: 1,732; Referee: Carlos Rodriguez

October 10 27	Detroit City FC	1–0	Rhode Island FC	Hamtramck, MI
7:00PM	Herrera (red card) 23'; Smith 56'	Report	Scardina (yellow card) 45+5'; Stoneman (yellow card) 55'; Sanchez (yellow card) 61'; Yao (yellow card) 62'; Herivaux (yellow card) 65'	Stadium: Keyworth Stadium; Attendance: 7,387; Referee: Muhammad Kaleia

October 14 28	Rhode Island FC	1–0	Loudoun United FC	Pawtucket, RI
7:30PM	Scardina 3'; Tsukada (yellow card) 61' (yellow-red card) 78'	Report	Murphy (yellow card) 59'; Aboukoura (yellow card) 81'; Niyongabire (yellow card) 87'	Stadium: Centreville Bank Stadium; Attendance: 7,092; Referee: Alyssa Pennington
Note: Game rescheduled due to the Blizzard of '26.

October 17 29	Rhode Island FC	1–1	Pittsburgh Riverhounds SC	Pawtucket, RI
7:30PM	Yao (yellow card) 11'; Foyo 74'	Report	Goldthorp 90+5'	Stadium: Centreville Bank Stadium; Attendance: 9,758; Referee: Joshua Encarnación

October 24 30	Hartford Athletic	2–1	Rhode Island FC	Hartford, CT
7:00PM	Coffey (yellow card) 45'; Anaku (yellow card) 45+1' (goal) 68'; Makangila (yellow card) 72'; Samadia 78'	Report	Yao (yellow card) 20' (goal) 25'; Sanchez (yellow card) 46'; Nodarse (yellow card) 53'; Kwizera (yellow card) 81'	Stadium: Trinity Health Stadium; Attendance: 4,775; Referee: Abdou Ndiaye

==== Playoffs ====
October 30 Eastern Conference Quarterfinals	Charleston Battery	1−1 (a.e.t.) (5−4 p)	Rhode Island FC	Mount Pleasant, SC
7:00PM	Landry (yellow card) 45'; Berry (yellow card) 45+1' (goal) 90+4'; Foster (yellow card) 51'; Ycaza (yellow card) 90+8'; Zamudio (yellow card) 109'	Report	Kwizera (yellow card) 12' (goal) 28'; Bacharach (yellow card) 45+3'; Afonso (yellow card) 74'; Shapiro-Thompson (yellow card) 90+3'; Vegas (yellow card) 90'; Nodarse (yellow card) 120'	Stadium: Patriots Point Soccer Complex; Attendance: 3,530; Referee: Matthew Thompson
	Penalties
	Berry (penalty scored); Suber (penalty scored); Ycaza (penalty scored); Smith (penalty missed); Kissiedou (penalty scored); Kelly (penalty scored)		(penalty scored) Kwizera; (penalty scored) Yutaro Tsukada; (penalty scored) Yao; (penalty missed) Bacharach; (penalty scored) Vegas; (penalty missed) Rodríguez

=== U.S. Open Cup ===
Rhode Island entered in the First Round of the 2026 U.S. Open Cup, joining the competition at the same time as 16 other USL Championship teams. Their first-round game against the amateur team CD Faialense of the Bay State Soccer League was played on Tuesday, March 17 at Centreville Bank Stadium. They were drawn at home against rivals Hartford Athletic for a second-round game on April 1. RIFC beat Hartford 2–0, with two first-half goals scored from corner kicks.

After their victory in the second round, RIFC was paired with New England Revolution in a Round of 32 game. The Revolution were seeded as designated hosts, but Gillette Stadium was not available for New England to play in their home stadium. The game was played at Centreville Bank Stadium, with The Revolution as the "home" team and Rhode Island "away." The Revolution took the lead on a 51st-minute goal from Diego Fagúndez. RIFC tied the game at 1–1 late in second-half stoppage time via a header from JJ Williams. After a scoreless extra time, the Revolution won the ensuing penalty-kick shootout.

March 17 First Round	Rhode Island FC (USLC)	4–0	(Massachusetts) CD Faialense (BSSL)	Pawtucket, RI
7:00PM	Rovira 13'; C. Williams 26'; Dorsey (yellow card) 35'; Scardina 78'; Willis 80' (o.g.)	Report	Fernandez (yellow card) 77'; Krause (yellow card) 87'	Stadium: Centreville Bank Stadium; Attendance: 1,156

April 1 Second Round	Rhode Island FC (USLC)	2–0	(Connecticut) Hartford Athletic (USLC)	Pawtucket, RI
7:00PM	Sanchez 12'; J. Williams 30'; Fuson (yellow card) 63'	Report	Chatzipaschalis (yellow card) 68'	Stadium: Centreville Bank Stadium; Attendance: 4,857; Referee: John Matto

April 14 Round of 32	New England Revolution (MLS) (Massachusetts)	1–1 (a.e.t.) (3−1 p)	Rhode Island FC (USLC)	Pawtucket, RI
7:00PM	Fagúndez 51'; Miller (yellow card) 53'; Zambrano (yellow card) 75'; Oyirwoth (yellow card) 90+4'; Da (yellow card) 107'	Report	Shapiro-Thompson (yellow card) 43'; Yao (yellow card) 64'; J. Williams 90+11'; Sanchez (yellow card) 98'	Stadium: Centreville Bank Stadium; Attendance: 6,073; Referee: Atahan Yaya
	Penalties
	Langoni (penalty scored); Farrell (penalty scored); Feingold (penalty missed); Beason (penalty scored)		(penalty scored) Diop; (penalty missed) Kwizera; (penalty missed) Afonso; (penalty missed) J. Williams

=== USL Cup ===
Pos	Lg	Team	Pld	W	PKW	PKL	L	GF	GA	GD	Pts	Qualification
1	USLC	Hartford Athletic	4	3	0	1	0	8	2	+6	10	Advance to knockout stage
2	USLC	Rhode Island FC	4	1	2	0	1	5	3	+2	7	
3	USLC	Brooklyn FC	4	2	0	1	1	9	4	+5	7	
4	USL1	Portland Hearts of Pine	4	1	1	1	1	6	9	−3	6	
5	USL1	New York Cosmos	4	1	0	1	2	5	10	−5	4	
6	USL1	Westchester SC	4	0	1	0	3	5	10	−5	2	

==== Group Rounds ====
April 25 Round 1	Hartford Athletic	0–0 (3−4 p)	Rhode Island FC	Hartford, CT
7:00PM	Moreira (yellow card) 55'; Anaku (yellow card) 89' (yellow-red card) 90'	Report	Holstad (yellow card) 90+4'	Stadium: Trinity Health Stadium; Attendance: 2,983; Referee: Muhammad Kaleia
	Penalties
	Diz (penalty scored); Coffey (penalty missed); Real (penalty scored); Scarlett (penalty scored); Careaga (penalty missed)		(penalty scored) Diop; (penalty missed) Bacharach; (penalty scored) Rodríguez; (penalty scored) Scardina; (penalty scored) Yao

May 16 Round 2	Portland Hearts of Pine	2–1	Rhode Island FC	Portland, ME
4:00PM	Kidd 3'; Wright 27' (pen.); Washington (yellow card) 67'	Report	Kwizera (yellow card) 48'; Dorsey 61'	Stadium: Fitzpatrick Stadium; Attendance: 6,307; Referee: Calin Radosav

June 6 Round 3	Rhode Island FC	3–0	Westchester SC	Pawtucket, RI
7:30PM	Holstad 41'; J. Williams 44'; Afonso 75'	Report		Stadium: Centreville Bank Stadium; Attendance: 10,554; Referee: Deny Kulasinac

July 11 Round 4	Rhode Island FC	1–1 (4−3 p)	Brooklyn FC	Pawtucket, RI
7:30PM	Rodríguez 18'; Nodarse (yellow card) 35' (yellow-red card) 50'; Yao (yellow card) 45+2'; Kwizera (yellow card) 52'; Stoneman (red card) 90+4'	Report	da Silva (yellow card) 28'; Obregón 45+4'; Romeo (yellow card) 82'	Stadium: Centreville Bank Stadium; Attendance: 7,030; Referee: Guido Gonzales Jr.
	Penalties
	Scardina (penalty scored); Shapiro-Thompson (penalty scored); Afonso (penalty scored); J. Williams (penalty missed); Vegas (penalty scored)		(penalty scored) McNamara; (penalty missed) Romeo; (penalty scored) Stojanovic; (penalty scored) McLaughlin; (penalty missed) Obregón

== Player statistics ==
=== Goals ===
Place	Pos.	No.	Name	USL Championship	US Open Cup	USL Cup	USLC Playoffs	Total
1	FW	9	(United States) JJ Williams	8	2	1	0	11
2	MF	17	(Rwanda) Jojea Kwizera	6	0	0	1	7
3	FW	8	(Brazil) Leo Afonso	4	0	1	0	5
4	DF	22	(United States) Nick Scardina	3	1	0	0	4
5	MF	7	(Jamaica) Dwayne Atkinson	3	0	0	0	3
5	DF	4	(Spain) Hugo Bacharach	3	0	0	0	3
5	FW	37	(United States) Stas Korzeniowski	3	0	0	0	3
5	DF	24	(Canada) Karifa Yao	3	0	0	0	3
9	DF	3	(United States) Aldair Sanchez	1	1	0	0	2
9	FW	14	(United States) Logan Dorsey	1	0	1	0	2
9	MF	12	(United States) Clay Holstad	1	0	1	0	2
9	FW	14	(Japan) Yutaro Tsukada	2	0	0	0	2
13	DF	2	(United States) Dani Rovira	0	1	0	0	1
13	DF	25	(United States) CJ Williams	0	1	0	0	1
13	FW	10	(Argentina) Agustín Rodríguez	0	0	1	0	1
13	DF	17	(Cuba) Frank Nodarse	1	0	0	0	1
13	DF	5	(United States) Grant Stoneman	1	0	0	0	1
13	MF	77	(United States) Amos Shapiro-Thompson	1	0	0	0	1
13	FW	18	(Netherlands) Osman Foyo	1	0	0	0	1
Own Goals				0	1	0	0	1
Total				42	7	5	1	55

=== Assists ===
Place	Pos.	No.	Name	USL Championship	US Open Cup	USL Cup	USLC Playoffs	Total
1	FW	9	(United States) JJ Williams	4	1	0	0	5
2	MF	77	(United States) Amos Shapiro-Thompson	3	0	1	0	4
2	FW	11	(United States) Noah Fuson	4	0	0	0	4
2	DF	22	(United States) Nick Scardina	4	0	0	0	4
2	MF	17	(Rwanda) Jojea Kwizera	3	0	1	0	4
6	FW	10	(Argentina) Agustín Rodríguez	2	1	0	0	3
6	FW	8	(Brazil) Leo Afonso	3	0	0	0	3
6	FW	14	(Japan) Yutaro Tsukada	3	0	0	0	3
6	DF	4	(Spain) Hugo Bacharach	2	1	0	0	3
10	MF	12	(United States) Clay Holstad	2	0	0	0	2
10	DF	3	(United States) Aldair Sanchez	0	1	1	0	2
12	DF	19	(United States) Kevin Vang	0	1	0	0	1
12	GK	1	(Spain) Koke Vegas	1	0	0	0	1
12	FW	18	(Netherlands) Osman Foyo	1	0	0	0	1
Total				32	5	3	0	40

=== Clean Sheets ===
Place	Pos.	No.	Name	USL Championship	US Open Cup	USL Cup	USLC Playoffs	Total
1	GK	1	(Spain) Koke Vegas	7	2	2	0	11
2	GK	30	(United States) Jacob Castro	1	0	0	0	1
Total				8	2	2	0	12

=== Disciplinary ===
No.	Pos.	Name	USL Championship		US Open Cup		USL Cup		USLC Playoffs		Total	
No.	Pos.	Name	Yellow card	Red card	Yellow card	Red card	Yellow card	Red card	Yellow card	Red card	Yellow card	Red card
1	GK	(Spain) Koke Vegas	1	1					1		2	1
2	DF	(Colombia) Dani Rovira	1								1	
3	DF	(United States) Aldair Sanchez	6		1						7	
4	DF	(Spain) Hugo Bacharach	10	1					1		11	1
5	DF	(United States) Grant Stoneman	2					1			2	1
7	MF	(Jamaica) Dwayne Atkinson	1								1	
8	FW	(Brazil) Leo Afonso	4						1		5	
9	FW	(United States) JJ Williams	3	1							3	1
10	FW	(Argentina) Agustín Rodríguez	3								3	
11	FW	(United States) Noah Fuson	2		1						3	
12	MF	(United States) Clay Holstad	3				1				4	
14	FW	(United States) Logan Dorsey			1						1	
14	FW	(Japan) Yutaro Tsukada	2	1							2	1
15	DF	(Cuba) Frank Nodarse	5					1	1		6	1
16	MF	(United States) Eric Klein	3								3	
17	MF	(Rwanda) Jojea Kwizera	8				2		1		11	
21	MF	(Haiti) Zachary Herivaux	3								3	
22	DF	(United States) Nick Scardina	1								1	
24	DF	(Canada) Karifa Yao	6		1		1				8	
37	FW	(United States) Stas Korzeniowski	2								2	
77	MF	(United States) Amos Shapiro-Thompson	4		1				1		6	
Total			70	4	5	0	4	2	6	0	85	6

== League and Cup Honors ==
- USL Championship Team of the Week
  - Hugo Bacharach – Week 21, 25
  - Jojea Kwizera – Week 3 (bench), 11/12, 19/20 (bench), 28
  - Frank Nodarse – Week 2 (bench), 5, 19/20, 23, 31
  - Nick Scardina – Week 11/12, 14/15, 33
  - Amos Shapiro-Thompson – Week 17/18 (bench), 31 (bench), 33 (bench)
  - Yutaro Tsukada – Week 25 (bench)
  - JJ Williams – Week 8/9 (bench), 11/12, 14/15, 23 (bench)
  - Karifa Yao – Week 31 (bench)
- USL Championship Goal of the Week
  - Jojea Kwizera – Week 12
  - Yutaro Tsukada – Week 28
- USL Championship Save of the Week
  - Koke Vegas – Week 6, 30
- USL Cup Team of the Round
  - Clay Holstad – Third Round
  - Frank Nodarse – Third Round (bench)
- U.S. Open Cup Team of the Round
  - Dani Rovira – First Round (bench)
  - JJ Williams – Second Round
