= 2026 Birmingham Legion FC season =

American soccer club season

Birmingham Legion FC
2026 season
- General Manager: Jay Heaps
- Head Coach: Jay Heaps
- Stadium: Protective Stadium
- USL Championship: Eastern Conference: 10th
- Playoffs: DNQ
- U.S. Open Cup: DNQ
- USL Cup: Group stage
- Top goalscorer: League: All: Romario Williams & Ronaldo Damus (7)
- Highest home attendance: 5,084 (May 7, against Miami FC)
- Lowest home attendance: 828 (September 12, against Charleston Battery)
- Average home league attendance: 3,521
Home colors	Away colors

The 2026 Birmingham Legion season was the eighth season of play in the club's history in the USL Championship, the second division of American soccer.

Over the offseason, the Legion underwent a coaching change. Mark Briggs, the coach for the 2025 season, left the club to become the lead assistant head coach for FC Dallas of first division league Major League Soccer. Jay Heaps, who had previously coached the New England Revolution for six seasons from 2011 to 2017 and has been the general manager of the Legion since the club's founding, stepped into the head coaching role for the 2026 season.

Due to not qualifying for the 2025 USL Championship playoffs, the Legion didn't qualify for the 2026 US Open Cup, which was shortened to accommodate the 2026 FIFA World Cup.

== Squad information ==
=== Roster ===
As of April 22, 2026

Note: Flags indicate national team as defined under FIFA eligibility rules; some limited exceptions apply. Players may hold more than one non-FIFA nationality.

No.	Pos.	Nation	Player
1	GK	CZE	Jassem Koleilat
2	DF	USA	Leo Duru (on loan from Blackburn Rovers)
3	DF	RWA	Phanuel Kavita
4	DF	USA	Ramiz Hamouda
5	DF	USA	Keegan Hughes (on loan from New England Revolution)
6	MF	AUS	Sam McIllhatton
8	MF	NCA	Kadeem Cole
9	FW	HAI	Ronaldo Damus
11	DF	USA	Dawson McCartney
12	GK	USA	Trevor McMullen
14	MF	ENG	Samuel Shashoua
15	FW	CAN	Tyler Pasher

No.	Pos.	Nation	Player
16	MF	JAM	Peter-Lee Vassell
17	FW	JAM	Romario Williams
18	MF	GHA	Seth Antwi
19	MF	USA	Gevork Diarbian
20	DF	GRN	A. J. Paterson
21	FW	URU	Sebastian Tregarthen
23	FW	USA	Sebastian Saucedo
26	DF	ANT	Amir Daley
27	DF	USA	Bryce Washington
77	DF	JAM	Nico Brown
81	FW	USA	Serge Ngoma (on loan from New York Red Bulls)

=== Team management ===
Front office
Owners	Jack Bryant; Billy Harbert; John Harbert; Jeff Logan; James Outland; Jim Rein; Lee Styslinger III
President and general manager	Jay Heaps
Vice president of operations	Jason Coleman
Director of ticketing	Cason Gooch
Coaching staff
Head coach	Jay Heaps
Assistant coach	Eric Avila
Assistant coach	Braeden Cloutier

Last updated: March 25, 2019

== Competitions ==
=== USL Championship ===
==== Standings ====
Pos	Team	Pld	W	L	T	GF	GA	GD	Pts	Qualification
8	Miami FC	30	9	12	9	39	49	−10	36	Playoffs
9	Indy Eleven	30	9	14	7	35	41	−6	34	
10	Birmingham Legion FC	30	6	12	12	40	46	−6	30	
11	Loudoun United FC	30	6	11	13	40	46	−6	31	
12	Brooklyn FC	30	5	19	6	34	63	−29	21	

Updated to match(es) played on October 24, 2026. Source: USL Championship Standings
Rules for classification: 1) total wins against conference opponents; 2) goal differential against conference opponents; 3) goals scored against conference opponents; 4) head-to-head points against conference opponents; 5) points per game against conference opponents; 6) points per game against non-conference opponents; 7) fewest disciplinary points; 8) coin toss or drawing of lots

==== Match results ====
On December 16, 2025, the USL Championship released the schedule for all 25 teams for both the regular season and the USL Cup.

All times in Central Time Zone.

March 7, 2026 1	Birmingham Legion FC	0 – 1	Tampa Bay Rowdies	Birmingham, Alabama
7:00 PM		Report, USL	Marco Micaletto 57'	Stadium: Protective Stadium; Attendance: 4,787; Referee: Brad Jensen

March 11, 2026 2	Birmingham Legion FC	0 – 0	Hartford Athletic	Birmingham, Alabama
11:00 AM		Report		Stadium: Protective Stadium; Attendance: 3,974; Referee: Ekaterina Koroleva

March 21, 2026 3	Charleston Battery	3–2	Birmingham Legion FC	Mt. Pleasant, South Carolina
7:00 PM	Swan 58'; Ycaza 80' (pen.), 90+3'	Report	Williams 25'; Shashoua 27'	Stadium: Patriots Point Soccer Complex; Attendance: 3,945; Referee: Muhammad Kaleia

April 4, 2026 4	Loudoun United FC	2–2	Birmingham Legion FC	Leesburg, Virginia
4:00 PM	Murphy 31'; Ordóñez 79' (pen.)	Report	Pasher 16', 54'	Stadium: Segra Field; Attendance: 1,168; Referee: Joe Surgan

April 11, 2026 5	Birmingham Legion FC	1–0	Pittsburgh Riverhounds SC	Birmingham, Alabama
4:00 PM	Tregarthen 25'	Report		Stadium: Protective Stadium; Attendance: 3,316; Referee: Mark Verso

April 18, 2026 6	Birmingham Legion FC	2–2	Indy Eleven	Birmingham, Alabama
5:00 PM	Pasher 39' (pen.); McIllhatton 89'	Report	Kizza 68'; O'Brien 81'	Stadium: Protective Stadium; Attendance: 3,657; Referee: Calin Radosav

May 2, 2026 7	Rhode Island FC	1–3	Birmingham Legion FC	Pawtucket, Rhode Island
6:30 PM	Afonso 17'	Report	Tregarthen 3'; Kavita 48'; Damus 57'	Stadium: Centreville Bank Stadium; Attendance: 7,596; Referee: Nabil Bensalah

May 7, 2026 8	Birmingham Legion FC	0–0	Miami FC	Birmingham, Alabama
7:00 PM		Report		Stadium: Protective Stadium; Attendance: 5,084; Referee: Benjamin Meyer

May 23, 2026 9	Monterey Bay FC	2–0	Birmingham Legion FC	Seaside, California
9:00 PM	Bidois 60'; Blancas 78'	Report		Stadium: Cardinale Stadium; Referee: Matthew Corrigan

June 3, 2026 10	Birmingham Legion FC	1–1	Louisville City FC	Birmingham, Alabama
7:00 PM	Diarbian 10'	Report	Niang 42'	Stadium: Protective Stadium; Attendance: 3,659; Referee: Abdou Ndiaye

June 13, 2026 11	Birmingham Legion FC	1–2	Las Vegas Lights FC	Birmingham, Alabama
7:00 PM	Saucedo 89'	Report	Anderson 15'; Rodriguez 60'	Stadium: Protective Stadium; Attendance: 3,619; Referee: Cristian Campo Hernández

June 17, 2026 12	Oakland Roots SC	1–1	Birmingham Legion FC	Oakland, California
2:00 PM	Wilson 90+3'	Report	Vassell 45+2'	Stadium: Oakland Coliseum; Attendance: 4,601; Referee: Trevor Wiseman

June 20, 2026 13	Birmingham Legion FC	1–1	Loudoun United FC	Birmingham, Alabama
7:00 PM	Tregarthen 89'	Report	Aboukoura 67'	Stadium: Protective Stadium; Attendance: 2,662; Referee: Alyssa Pennington

July 2, 2026 14	Birmingham Legion FC	1–2	Detroit City FC	Birmingham, Alabama
7:00 PM	Pasher 24' (pen.); Antwi (yellow card) 37'; Tregarthen (yellow card) 52'; Brown (yellow card) 84'; Saucedo (yellow card) 90+9'	Report	Hope-Gund 2'; Silva (yellow card) 31'; Hernandez-Foster (yellow card) 45+6'; Stanley (yellow card) 88'; Morris 90+2'	Stadium: Protective Stadium; Attendance: 3,615; Referee: Kalilou Jarju

July 5, 2026 15	Miami FC	1–1	Birmingham Legion FC	Miami, Florida
6:00 PM	Rocha 41'	Report	Vassell 78'	Stadium: Pitbull Stadium; Attendance: 606; Referee: Elvis Osmanovic

July 25, 2026 16	Birmingham Legion FC	PP	New Mexico United	Birmingham, Alabama
7:00 PM		Report		Stadium: Protective Stadium
Note: Match postponed due to inclement weather.

July 29, 2026 17	Louisville City FC	2–1	Birmingham Legion FC	Louisville, Kentucky
6:30 PM	Lambert 6', 74'	Report	Shashoua 42'	Stadium: Lynn Family Stadium; Attendance: 8,258; Referee: Jeremy Scheer

August 2, 2026 18	Birmingham Legion FC	1–0	Rhode Island FC	Birmingham, Alabama
7:00 PM	Damus 63'	Report		Stadium: Protective Stadium; Attendance: 3,253; Referee: Carlos Rodriguez

August 8, 2026 19	Brooklyn FC	v	Birmingham Legion FC	Brooklyn, New York
6:00 PM		Report		Stadium: Maimonides Park
Note: Postponed due to inclement weather.

August 15, 2026 20	Colorado Springs Switchbacks FC	3–2	Birmingham Legion FC	Colorado Springs, Colorado
8:00 PM	Metusala 45+4', (yellow card) 66' (yellow-red card) 90+11'; Perez 90+5'; Tejada 90+9'	Report	Brown 24', (red card) 49'; Ngoma 86'	Stadium: Weidner Field; Attendance: 6,860; Referee: John Matto

August 22, 2026 21	Birmingham Legion FC	2–3	Sporting Club Jacksonville	Birmingham, Alabama
7:00 PM	Damus 55'; Williams 90+3'	Report	Jääskeläinen 58'; Kuzain 76'; Wilson 90+11'	Stadium: Protective Stadium; Attendance: 3,013; Referee: Deny Kulasinac

August 29, 2026 22	Hartford Athletic	3–2	Birmingham Legion FC	Hartford, Connecticut
6:00 PM	Coffey 42'; Ngalina 45+3'; Scarlett 74'	Report	Williams 21', 39'	Stadium: Trinity Health Stadium; Attendance: 4,059

September 5, 2026 23	Indy Eleven	2–2	Birmingham Legion FC	Indianapolis, Indiana
6:00 PM	Hafferty 20'; Sing 90+8'	Report	Pasher 40'; Williams 66'	Stadium: Carroll Stadium; Attendance: 8,898; Referee: Atahan Yaya

September 12, 2026 24	Birmingham Legion FC	2–2	Charleston Battery	Birmingham, Alabama
6:00 PM	Tregarthen 11'; Williams 39'	Report	Berry 14', 21'	Stadium: Dunnavant Valley Fields; Attendance: 828; Referee: Edson Carvajal
Note: Rescheduled from September 13 and moved to Dunnavant Valley Fields to accommodate a concert in Protective Stadium.

September 19, 2026 25	Tampa Bay Rowdies	4–0	Birmingham Legion FC	St. Petersburg, Florida
6:30 PM	Paterson 30' (o.g.); Myers 39', 56', 60'	Report		Stadium: Al Lang Stadium; Attendance: 5,440; Referee: Muhammad Hassan

September 23, 2026 26	Birmingham Legion FC	v	Brooklyn FC	Birmingham, Alabama
11:00 AM	Vassell 14'; Ngoma 48'; Saucedo 84' (pen.); Damus 90+2'	Report		Stadium: Protective Stadium; Attendance: 4,350; Referee: Amin Hadzic

October 3, 2026 27	Detroit City FC	1–0	Birmingham Legion FC	Hamtramck, Michigan
6:00 PM	Hernandez-Foster 22' (pen.)	Report		Stadium: Keyworth Stadium; Attendance: 6,575; Referee: Matthew Corrigan

October 10, 2026 28	Sporting Club Jacksonville	0–1	Birmingham Legion FC	Jacksonville, Florida
4:00 PM		Report	Paterson 37'	Stadium: Hodges Stadium; Referee: Elvis Osmanovic

October 18, 2026 29	Birmingham Legion FC	0–0	Loudoun United FC	Birmingham, Alabama
4:00 AM		Report		Stadium: Dunnavant Valley Fields; Attendance: 3,121; Referee: Stephen Foster

October 24, 2026 30	Pittsburgh Riverhounds SC	2–1	Birmingham Legion FC	Pittsburgh, Pennsylvania
6:00 PM	Amann 55'; Griffin 56'	Report	Damus 82'	Stadium: Highmark Stadium; Attendance: 6,024; Referee: Muhammad Kaleia

=== USL Cup ===
The Legion participated in the third edition of the USL Cup, and the second edition to feature teams from both the USL Championship and League One.

==== Group standings ====
Pos	Lg	Team	Pld	W	PKW	PKL	L	GF	GA	GD	Pts	Qualification
1	USLC	San Antonio FC	4	3	1	0	0	5	1	+4	11	Advance to knockout stage
2	USLC	Birmingham Legion FC	4	2	1	1	0	7	2	+5	9	
3	USL1	One Knoxville SC	4	0	3	0	1	3	4	−1	6	
4	USLC	FC Tulsa	4	1	0	1	2	4	6	−2	4	
5	USL1	Corpus Christi FC	4	1	0	1	2	2	5	−3	4	

==== Group stage ====
April 25, 2026	San Antonio FC	0–0 (3–2 p)	Birmingham Legion FC	San Antonio, Texas
7:30 PM CDT		Report		Stadium: Toyota Field; Attendance: 5,850; Referee: Atahan Yaya
	Penalties
	Taintor (penalty scored); Cuello (penalty scored); Suárez (penalty scored); Hernandez (penalty scored)		(penalty scored) Pasher; (penalty missed) Saucedo; (penalty missed) Tregarthen; (penalty scored) Williams

May 16, 2026	Chattanooga Red Wolves SC	1–1 (2–3 p)	Birmingham Legion FC	Chattanooga, Tennessee
6:00 PM CDT	Mercer 77'	Report	Saucedo 67'	Stadium: CHI Memorial Stadium; Attendance: 1,551; Referee: Natalie Simon
	Penalties
	Hernandez (penalty missed); Bentley (penalty missed); Ramos (penalty missed); Acosta (penalty scored); Lelin (penalty scored)		(penalty missed) Pasher; (penalty scored) McCartney; (penalty scored) Saucedo; (penalty missed) Hughes; (penalty scored) Ngoma

June 9, 2026	Birmingham Legion FC	3–0	Corpus Christi FC	Birmingham, Alabama
7:00 PM CDT	Saucedo 9' (pen.); Williams 12'; Tregarthen 72'	Report		Stadium: Protective Stadium; Attendance: 2,565; Referee: Muhammad Hassan

July 11, 2026	Birmingham Legion FC	3–1	FC Tulsa	Birmingham, Alabama
7:00 PM CDT	Vassell 28', 84'; Williams 90+3'	Report	Dorsey 33'	Stadium: Protective Stadium; Attendance: 3,237; Referee: Gerald Flores
