= Markus Anderson =

American soccer player (born 2003)

Personal information
- Full name: Markus Adeniyi Anderson Adedeji
- Date of birth: December 11, 2003 (age 22)
- Place of birth: Philadelphia, United States
- Height: 5 ft 10 in (1.78 m)
- Position: Forward

Team information
- Current team: Lyngby (on loan from Philadelphia Union)
- Number: 35

Youth career
- Manhattan Kickers FC
- 2016–2021: RC Alcobendas
- 2021–2024: Rayo Majadahonda

Senior career*
Years	Team	Apps	(Gls)
2022–2023	Paracuellos Antamira	29	(10)
2023–2024	Rayo Majadahonda	21	(3)
2024–2025	Philadelphia Union II	33	(11)
2024–	Philadelphia Union	7	(1)
2026	→ Brooklyn FC (loan)	16	(6)
2026–	→ Lyngby (loan)	0	(0)
- * Club domestic league appearances and goals as of 3 September 2026 ‡ National team caps and goals as of 14:02, 19 September 2025 (UTC)

Markus Adeniyi Anderson Adedeji (born December 11, 2003) is an American professional soccer player who plays as a Forward for Danish Superliga club Lyngby Boldklub, on loan from the Philadelphia Union of Major League Soccer.

== Club career ==
A youth product of the American club Manhattan Kickers FC, Anderson moved to Spain at 13 and finished his development with Rayo Ciudad Alcobendas and Rayo Majadahonda. He began his senior career with Rayo Majadahonda's then-reserve team Paracuellos Antamira in 2022 in the Tercera Federación with 10 goals in 29 games. The following season, he was promoted to Rayo Majadahonda's senior team in the Primera Federación with 3 goals in 21 appearances. On January 29, 2024, he returned to the United States with Philadelphia Union on a contract until 2026, and was first assigned to their reserves Philadelphia Union II. He made his senior debut with Philadelphia Union in a 1–1 Major League Soccer tie with Sporting Kansas City on March 3, 2024.

On February 27, 2026 Anderson was loaned to USL Championship club Brooklyn FC to play under former Union II coach Marlon LeBlanc.

On 2 September 2026, Anderson moved abroad to join Danish Superliga side Lyngby Boldklub on a loan-deal until end of 2026.

== Personal life ==
Born in the United States, Anderson is of Nigerian descent.

== Honors ==
Philadelphia Union

- Supporters' Shield: 2025
