= Yutaro Tsukada =

Japanese footballer (born 2001)

Yutaro Tsukada 塚田 裕太郎
- Tsukada with Rhode Island FC in 2026

Personal information
- Date of birth: 28 July 2001 (age 25)
- Place of birth: Tokyo, Japan
- Height: 5 ft 11 in (1.80 m)
- Position: Winger

Team information
- Current team: Rhode Island FC (on loan from Orlando City)
- Number: 14

Youth career
- FC Tokyo

College career
Years	Team	Apps	(Gls)
2020–2021	Daytona State Falcons	24	(26)
2022–2023	West Virginia Mountaineers	40	(13)

Senior career*
Years	Team	Apps	(Gls)
2022	New Mexico United U23	4	(3)
2023	Capital FC		(5)
2024	Orlando City B	14	(4)
2024	→ Orlando City (loan)	1	(0)
2024–	Orlando City	4	(0)
2024–2026	→ Orlando City B (loan)	11	(3)
2026–	→ Rhode Island FC (loan)	13	(2)
- * Club domestic league appearances and goals as of 03:03, 29 October 2026 (UTC)

Yutaro Tsukada (塚田 裕太郎, Tsukada Yutaro; born 28 July 2001) is a Japanese professional footballer who plays as a winger for USL Championship club Rhode Island FC, on loan from Major League Soccer club Orlando City.

== Early life ==
Tsukada was born in Tokyo, Japan. He played youth football with FC Tokyo.

== College career ==
In 2020, Tsukada began attending Daytona State College. On 11 September 2021, he scored a hat-trick in a 4–2 victory over the Georgia Military College Bulldogs. At the end of his sophomore season, he was named to the USC First Team All-America, the NJCAA DI All-American Team, Junior College Division I Men All-East Region, and the Region 8 All-Region Team and the Region 8 Player of the Year. He departed the school holding six school records - most goals in a season (20), most goals in two seasons (26), most hat tricks (4), fastest goal in school history (32 seconds), most free kicks scored (4), and most points (63).

In 2022, he transferred to West Virginia University to play for the men's soccer team in NCAA Division I. He made his debut on August 25 against the Robert Morris Colonials. On October 11, 2022, he scored his first goal in a victory over the Lehigh Mountain Hawks. In October 2023, he was named the WVU Student-Athlete of the Week and the Sun Belt Conference Offensive Player of the Week, and earned WVU Student-Athlete of the Week honors a second time in November. At the end of his senior season, he was named to the All-Sun Belt First Team, Sun Belt All-Tournament Team, All-Southeast Region First Team, Scholar All-South Region First Team, TopDrawerSoccer Best XI Second Team, All-America Third Team, and the College Soccer News All-America Second Team.

== Club career ==
=== Semi-professional ===
In 2022, Tsukada joined New Mexico United U23, the development team of USL Championship team New Mexico United, in USL League Two. On 26 May, Tsukada made his debut for the club and scored his first goal in a 2–2 draw against the Colorado International Soccer Academy. Tsukada made four appearances for the team and scored three goals.

In 2023, he joined Capital FC in their inaugural season in USL League Two after the team had severed ties with the Portland Timbers. On 28 May, Tsukada his first goal for the club, the equalizing goal of a 3–1 win at PDX FC. Tsukada would score five goals for the club.

=== Orlando City ===
At the 2024 MLS SuperDraft, Tsukada was selected in the first round (25th overall) by Orlando City. In March 2024, he signed a one-year contract with the reserve affiliate, Orlando City B, in MLS Next Pro. On 16 March, he made his professional debut, scoring a free kick in a 3–2 victory over Atlanta United 2. Tsukada would score seven goals and assist in seven more, totaling 14 goal contributions, the second most for the team behind Alex Freeman. In May, Tsukada signed two short-term loans with the first team. He made his Major League Soccer debut on 15 May in a substitute appearance against Inter Miami. On 15 August, Tsukada signed a contract with the first team through 2025, with club options in 2026 and 2027.

On 8 February 2025, during a pre-season friendly against CF Montréal, Tsukada suffered a torn anterior cruciate ligament. On 25 February, it was announced by the club that Tsukada had undergone a successful surgery to reconstruct the ligament and that he was placed onto the season ending injury list. On 17 November, despite Tsukada being unable to make a competitive appearance for Orlando City due to injury throughout the 2025 season, Orlando City exercised their 2026 contract option for Tsukada.

On 30 July 2026, Orlando City loaned Tsukada to USL Championship club Rhode Island FC for the remainder of their 2026 seasons. Three days later, Tsukada made his debut as a second-half substitute in a 1–0 loss to Birmingham Legion, and in the following match on 8 August, Tsukada scored to help Rhode Island FC to a 2–0 win over the Colorado Springs Switchbacks.

== Personal life ==
On 10 January 2026, Tsukada announced that he had married his partner Mio, a college volleyball player who played for the New Mexico Military Institute, the Louisiana Ragin' Cajuns, and the Florida State Seminoles. Later that year on 12 June, the couple announced they were having their first child.

== Career statistics ==
As of 30 October 2026

Club	Season	League			U.S. Open Cup		Playoffs		Other		Total	
Club	Season	Division	Apps	Goals	Apps	Goals	Apps	Goals	Apps	Goals	Apps	Goals
New Mexico United U23	2022	USL League Two	4	3	—		—		—		4	3
Orlando City B	2024	MLS Next Pro	14	4	—		—		—		14	4
Orlando City (loan)	2024	Major League Soccer	1	0	—		0	0	1 (Note: Appearances in Leagues Cup)	0	2	0
Orlando City	2024	Major League Soccer	2	0	—		0	0	—		2	0
Orlando City	2025	Major League Soccer	0	0	0	0	0	0	0	0	0	0
Orlando City	2026	Major League Soccer	2	0	1	0	—		0	0	3	0
Orlando City	Orlando City total		5	0	1	0	0	0	1	0	7	0
Orlando City B (loan)	2024	MLS Next Pro	8	3	—		1	0	—		9	3
Orlando City B (loan)	2026	MLS Next Pro	3	0	—		—		—		3	0
Orlando City B (loan)	Total		11	3	0	0	1	0	0	0	12	3
Rhode Island FC (loan)	2026	USL Championship	13	2	—		1	0	0	0	14	2
Career total			47	12	1	0	2	0	1	0	51	12

== Honours ==
Individual

- Daytona State Falcons Spotlight Player of the Year: 2021
- United Soccer Coaches Junior College Division I Men's All-America Team: 2021
- NJCAA DI All-American Team: 2021
- Junior College Division I Men All-East Region: 2021
- Sun Belt All-Tournament Team: 2023
- All-Sun Belt First Team: 2023
- United Soccer Coaches All-Southeast Region First Team: 2023
- United Soccer Coaches Scholar All-South Region First Team: 2023
- United Soccer Coaches All-America Third Team: 2023
- College Soccer News All-America Second Team: 2023
- TopDrawerSoccer Best XI Second Team: 2023
- MLS Next Pro Player of the Month: May 2024
