= Serge Ngoma =

American soccer player (born 2005)

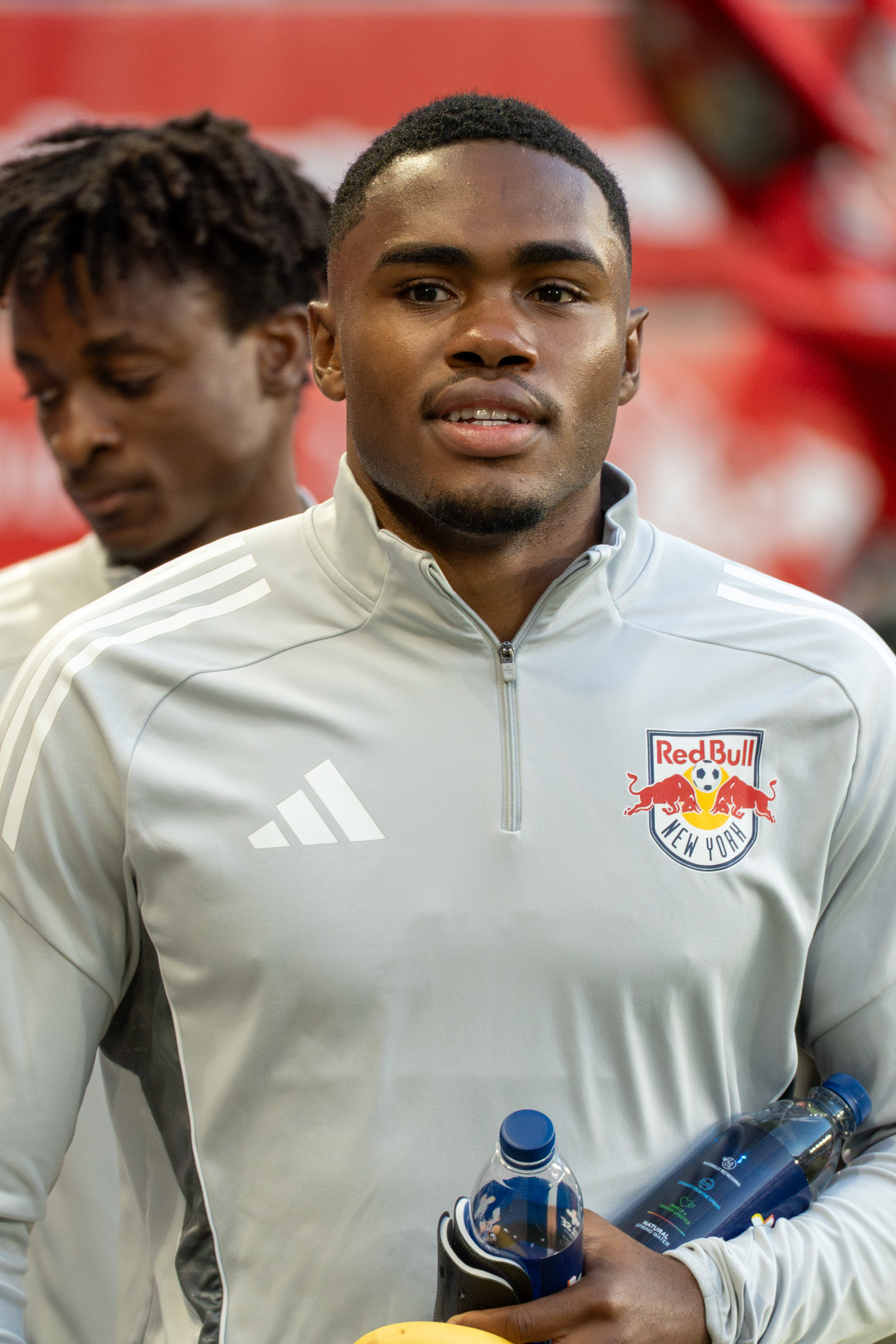
- Ngoma in 2025

Personal information
- Full name: Serge Patrick Ngoma
- Date of birth: July 9, 2005 (age 21)
- Place of birth: North Plainfield, New Jersey, United States
- Height: 5 ft 10 in (1.78 m)
- Position: Winger

Team information
- Current team: Birmingham Legion (on loan from New York Red Bulls)
- Number: 81

Youth career
- 2017–2020: New York Red Bulls

Senior career*
Years	Team	Apps	(Gls)
2020–2022	New York Red Bulls II	23	(3)
2022–	New York Red Bulls	35	(4)
2026–	→ Birmingham Legion (loan)	24	(2)

International career^{‡}
2025	United States U20	4	(0)
- * Club domestic league appearances and goals as of November 2, 2026 ‡ National team caps and goals as of October 24, 2025

Serge Patrick Ngoma (born July 9, 2005) is an American soccer player who plays as a winger for Birmingham Legion FC in the USL Championship on loan from Major League Soccer club New York Red Bulls.

== Career ==
=== Youth ===
Born in North Plainfield, New Jersey, Ngoma joined the Hayden Boys in September 2013, which was his first experience in organized football with a local club. He spent his final year with the team in 2014 before later joining the New York Red Bulls Academy in 2017. Ngoma made his professional debut for New York Red Bulls II, the reserve team of the New York Red Bulls, on September 23, 2020, against Atlanta United 2. He came on as a 69th-minute substitute for Omar Sowe as Red Bulls II were defeated 5–3. On August 20, 2021, he scored his first professional goal in a 3–2 defeat against the Charleston Battery.

=== New York Red Bulls ===
On February 17, 2022, the New York Red Bulls signed Ngoma to a four-year homegrown contract deal to play with the first team with an option year in 2026. On February 26, 2022, Ngoma made his debut for the first team, coming on as a second-half substitute in a 3–1 victory over San Jose Earthquakes in the opening match of the season. On June 30, 2022, Ngoma scored his first goal for the Red Bulls against Atlanta United in a 2–1 win. On July 24, 2022, Ngoma made his first start for New York in a 4–3 victory over Austin FC, scoring the opening goal of the match at Q2 Stadium.

=== Birmingham Legion ===
On March 6, 2026, Birmingham Legion announced they had acquired Ngoma on loan from New York Red Bulls for the 2026 USL Championship season.

== Personal life ==
Born in the United States, Ngoma is of Gabonese descent.

== Career statistics ==
As of match played October 24, 2026

Appearances and goals by club, season and competition
Club	Season	League			U.S. Open Cup		Other		Total	
Club	Season	Division	Apps	Goals	Apps	Goals	Apps	Goals	Apps	Goals
New York Red Bulls II	2020	USL Championship	3	0	—		—		3	0
New York Red Bulls II	2021	USL Championship	19	3	—		—		19	3
New York Red Bulls II	2022	USL Championship	1	0	—		—		1	0
New York Red Bulls II	2024	MLS Next Pro	0	0	1	1	0	0	1	1
New York Red Bulls II	Total		23	3	1	1	0	0	24	4
New York Red Bulls	2022	Major League Soccer	7	2	0	0	1 (Note: Appearance(s) in MLS Cup playoffs)	0	8	2
New York Red Bulls	2023	Major League Soccer	0	0	0	0	2	0	2	0
New York Red Bulls	2024	Major League Soccer	8	1	—		1	0	9	1
New York Red Bulls	2025	Major League Soccer	20	1	1	0	3 (Note: Appearances in Leagues Cup)	0	24	1
New York Red Bulls	Total		35	4	1	0	7	0	43	4
Birmingham Legion (loan)	2026	USL Championship	24	2	—		3 (Note: Appearances in USL Cup)	0	27	2
Career total			82	9	2	1	10	0	94	10
