= Ryan McLaughlin =

Northern Irish footballer (born 1994)

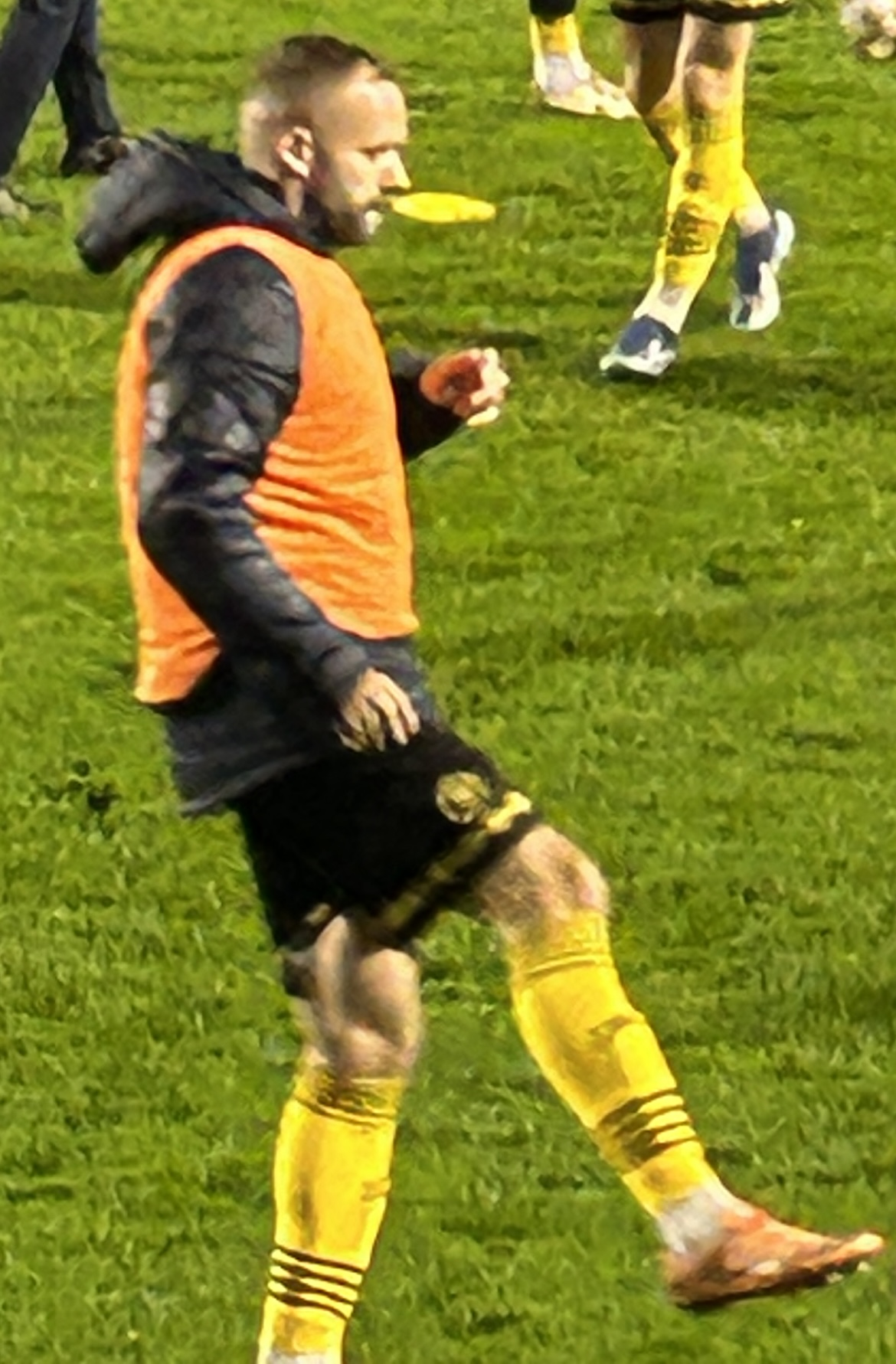
- McLaughlin warming up for St Patrick's Athletic in 2023

Personal information
- Full name: Ryan McLaughlin
- Date of birth: 30 September 1994 (age 32)
- Place of birth: Belfast, Northern Ireland
- Height: 5 ft 9 in (1.75 m)
- Position: Right-back

Team information
- Current team: Brooklyn FC
- Number: 23

Youth career
- 2009–2011: Glenavon
- 2011–2014: Liverpool

Senior career*
Years	Team	Apps	(Gls)
2014–2016	Liverpool	0	(0)
2014	→ Barnsley (loan)	9	(0)
2015–2016	→ Aberdeen (loan)	4	(0)
2016–2018	Oldham Athletic	52	(3)
2018–2019	Blackpool	6	(0)
2019–2021	Rochdale	50	(0)
2021–2022	Morecambe	19	(0)
2023–2025	St Patrick's Athletic	36	(0)
2026–	Brooklyn FC	21	(0)

International career^{‡}
2009–2010	Northern Ireland U16	11	(0)
2010–2011	Northern Ireland U17	13	(0)
2011–2012	Northern Ireland U19	7	(2)
2012–2016	Northern Ireland U21	6	(0)
2014–2018	Northern Ireland	5	(0)
- * Club domestic league appearances and goals as of 16:25, 4 November 2026 (UTC) ‡ National team caps and goals as of 15:28, 28 July 2023 (UTC)

Ryan McLaughlin (born 30 September 1994) is a Northern Irish footballer who last played as a right-back for USL Championship club Brooklyn FC. He has been capped five times by the Northern Ireland national team during his career.

== Club career ==
=== Early Career ===
McLaughlin played in the youth ranks for Lisburn Youth in Drumbo and was then picked up by Glenavon F.C. of the Irish League. in December 2009.

=== Liverpool ===
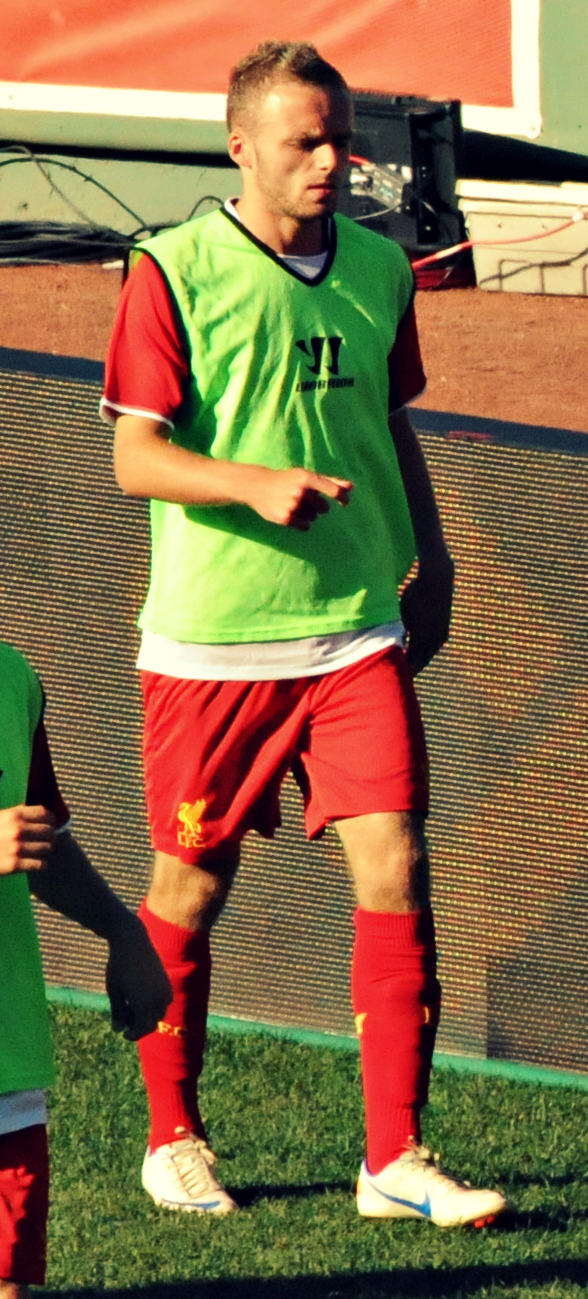
McLaughlin with Liverpool in 2012.

Liverpool signed 16-year-old Ryan McLaughlin in the summer of 2011 from Glenavon on a three-year deal.

On 9 January 2014, McLaughlin was signed by Football League Championship side Barnsley on a 28-day loan deal and was given squad number 27. He made his club and senior career debut on 18 January against Blackpool in the Championship. On 29 January 2014 it was announced that McLaughlin sustained an injury that will keep him out for four weeks. Two days later his loan was extended until the end of the season.

The only senior appearance McLaughlin made in the 2014–15 season was in an international friendly for Northern Ireland. In August 2015, he was loaned to Scottish Premiership club Aberdeen.

On 10 June 2016, he was released from the club.

=== Oldham Athletic ===
On 8 August 2016, McLaughlin signed a one-year deal with League One side Oldham Athletic, with the option of a further year. He was offered a new contract by Oldham at the end of the 2017–18 season, following their relegation.

=== Blackpool ===
He joined Blackpool on 17 July 2018 with the clubs agreeing a compensation package.

=== Rochdale ===
On 23 January 2019, McLaughlin signed for Rochdale for an undisclosed fee.

On 17 August 2020, McLaughlin returned to Rochdale signing a one-year contract.

=== Morecambe ===
On 10 September 2021, McLaughlin joined League One side Morecambe on a one-year deal.

On 1 September 2022, it was announced that McLaughlin had departed the club by mutual consent.

=== St Patrick's Athletic ===
On 28 July 2023, McLaughlin signed for League of Ireland Premier Division club St Patrick's Athletic. He made his debut for the club on 25 August 2023, playing the full 90 minutes of a 1–0 win away to UCD. McLaughlin featured in the Quarter and Semi Finals of the club's run to the 2023 FAI Cup Final, but missed out on the matchday squad due to injury as his side defeated Bohemians 3–1 at the Aviva Stadium in front of a record FAI Cup Final crowd of 43,881. He signed a new contract with the club on 7 December 2023. On 8 October 2024, McLaughlin captained a second string Pats side to a 2–1 win over St Mochta's in the final of the 2023–24 Leinster Senior Cup. On 5 December 2024, it was announced that McLaughlin had signed a new contract with the club. On 10 July 2025, McLaughlin made the first appearance in European competition of his career in a 1–0 win over Hegelmann of Lithuania in the UEFA Conference League at Richmond Park. On 14 August 2025, he scored his first goal for the club, giving his side a 2–0 lead away to Turkish giants Beşiktaş in the UEFA Conference League. He made a total of 53 appearances for the club, scoring 1 goal, before departing at the end of his contract in November 2025.

=== Brooklyn FC ===
On 3 March 2026, it was announced that McLaughlin had signed for newly formed USL Championship club Brooklyn FC ahead of their inaugural season. On 8 March 2026, he made his debut for the club in their first ever game, a 1–0 victory over Indy Eleven.

== International career ==
McLaughlin has represented Northern Ireland at Under-16, Under-17 and currently at Under-19 and Under-21 level. He was called up to the Northern Ireland senior squad for a friendly against Finland on 15 August 2012 but was forced to withdraw due to a hip injury.

On 19 May 2014, he was once again called up to the senior squad for two friendly matches in South America. On 31 May 2014, he made his National Team debut as a substitute against Uruguay. McLaughlin became the first Liverpool player to appear for the Irish Football Association selection since Elisha Scott 78 years previously.

May 2018 saw a return to the Northern Ireland team, after he was called up to the squad for a tour of Central America, featuring games against Panama and Costa Rica.

== Personal life ==
Born and raised in Belfast, McLaughlin has stated that he is a Catholic. McLaughlin is the younger brother of fellow defender Conor McLaughlin. He is friends with boxer Michael Conlan, and is sometimes nicknamed "Becks". McLaughlin proposed to his partner Jennifer on Christmas Eve 2023 at the Rockefeller Ice Rink. In 2024, McLaughlin stated in an interview that as well as providing him with occasional media work, his former club Liverpool were currently putting him through his UEFA B licence for coaching.

== Career statistics ==
=== Club ===
As of match played 6 September 2026

Appearances and goals by club, season and competition
Club	Season	League			National Cup (Note: Includes FA Cup, Scottish Cup, FAI Cup & U.S. Open Cup)		League Cup (Note: Includes EFL Cup, Scottish League Cup & USL Cup)		Continental		Other		Total	
Club	Season	Division	Apps	Goals	Apps	Goals	Apps	Goals	Apps	Goals	Apps	Goals	Apps	Goals
Liverpool	2013–14	Premier League	0	0	0	0	0	0	–		–		0	0
Liverpool	2014–15	Premier League	0	0	0	0	0	0	0 (Note: Appearances in the UEFA Champions League & UEFA Europa League)	0	–		0	0
Liverpool	2015–16	Premier League	0	0	0	0	0	0	0 (Note: Appearances in the UEFA Europa League)	0	–		0	0
Liverpool	Total		0	0	0	0	0	0	0	0	–		0	0
Barnsley (loan)	2013–14	Championship	9	0	0	0	0	0	–		–		9	0
Aberdeen (loan)	2015–16	Scottish Premiership	4	0	0	0	1	0	–		–		5	0
Oldham Athletic	2016–17	League One	36	2	2	0	1	0	–		4 (Note: Appearances in the EFL Trophy)	0	43	2
Oldham Athletic	2017–18	League One	16	1	0	0	1	0	–		2	0	19	1
Oldham Athletic	Total		52	3	2	0	2	0	–		6	0	62	3
Blackpool	2018–19	League One	6	0	1	0	1	0	–		3	0	11	0
Rochdale	2018–19	League One	13	0	–		–		–		–		13	0
Rochdale	2019–20	League One	3	0	2	0	1	0	–		0	0	6	0
Rochdale	2020–21	League One	34	0	0	0	1	0	–		1	0	36	0
Rochdale	Total		50	0	3	0	2	0	–		1	0	56	0
Morecambe	2021–22	League One	19	0	3	0	0	0	–		1	0	23	0
Morecambe	2022–23	League One	0	0	0	0	0	0	–		0	0	0	0
Morecambe	Total		19	0	3	0	0	0	–		1	0	23	0
St Patrick's Athletic	2023	LOI Premier Division	2	0	2	0	–		–		–		4	0
St Patrick's Athletic	2024	LOI Premier Division	16	0	0	0	–		0 (Note: Appearance(s) in the UEFA Conference League)	0	3 (Note: Appearance(s) in the Leinster Senior Cup)	0	19	0
St Patrick's Athletic	2025	LOI Premier Division	18	0	3	0	–		6	1	3	0	30	1
St Patrick's Athletic	Total		36	0	5	0	–		6	1	6	0	53	1
Brooklyn FC	2026	USL Championship	16	0	0	0	2	0	–		–		18	0
Career total			192	3	13	0	8	0	6	1	17	0	236	4

=== International ===
As of match played 3 June 2018

Appearances and goals by national team and year
National team	Year	Apps	Goals
Northern Ireland	2014	2	0
Northern Ireland	2015	1	0
Northern Ireland	2018	2	0
Total		5	0

== Honours ==
St Patrick's Athletic

- FAI Cup (1): 2023
- Leinster Senior Cup (1): 2023–24
