= Nick Scardina =

American soccer player (born 2001)

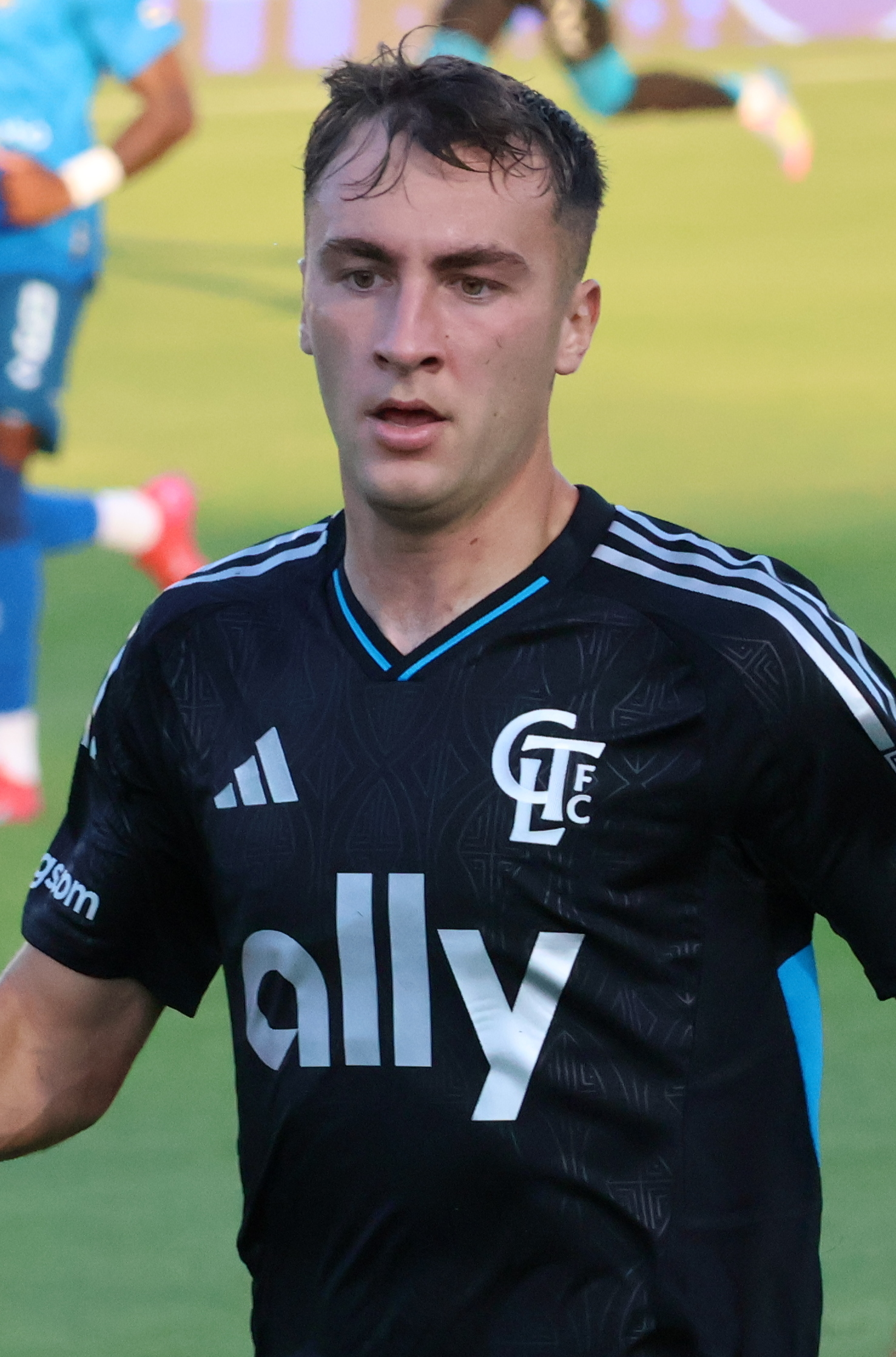
- Scardina with Charlotte FC in 2025

Personal information
- Full name: Nicholas Scardina
- Date of birth: June 22, 2001 (age 25)
- Place of birth: Portland, Oregon, US
- Height: 5 ft 11 in (1.80 m)
- Positions: Full-back; attacking midfielder; forward

Team information
- Current team: Rhode Island FC
- Number: 22

Youth career
- 2017–2019: Portland Timbers

College career
Years	Team	Apps	(Gls)
2019–2022	Washington Huskies	60	(18)

Senior career*
Years	Team	Apps	(Gls)
2019	Portland Timbers 2	1	(0)
2021	PDX FC	5	(1)
2022	Crossfire Premier		
2023–2025	Charlotte FC	16	(0)
2023–2025	→ Crown Legacy FC (loan)	41	(9)
2026–	Rhode Island FC	28	(3)
- * Club domestic league appearances and goals as of November 7, 2026

Nicholas Scardina (born June 22, 2001) is an American professional soccer player who plays for Rhode Island FC in the USL Championship.

== Career ==
=== Youth ===
Scardina was born in Portland, Oregon and attended Central Catholic High School and played with the Portland Timbers academy team. Scardina appeared as a late substitute in the USL Championship for Portland Timbers 2 during a 2-1 loss to Reno 1868 on June 25, 2019.

=== College and amateur ===
In 2019, Scardina attended the University of Washington, where he played four seasons between 2019 and 2022, making 60 appearances, scoring 18 goals and tallying seven assists. In 2022, he was named to the Pac-12 All-Conference First Team.

While at college, Scardina appeared in the USL League Two side PDX FC in 2021, and with National Premier Soccer League side Crossfire Premier in 2022.

=== Professional ===
On December 22, 2022, Scardina was selected 40th overall in the 2023 MLS SuperDraft by Charlotte FC. On February 24, 2023, he signed his first professional deal with Charlotte ahead of their second Major League Soccer season. Charlotte picked up his contract option at the end of the 2023 season.

Following his release from Charlotte at the end of the 2025 season, Scardina moved to USL Championship side Rhode Island FC on January 12, 2026.
