= Agustín Rodríguez (footballer, born 2004) =

Argentine footballer (born 2004)

Personal information
- Full name: Agustín Javier Rodríguez
- Date of birth: 2 May 2004 (age 22)
- Place of birth: Lomas de Zamora, Buenos Aires, Argentina
- Height: 1.69 m (5 ft 7 in)
- Position: Midfielder

Team information
- Current team: Rhode Island FC (on loan from Lanús)
- Number: 10

Youth career
- Lanús

Senior career*
Years	Team	Apps	(Gls)
2021–	Lanús	18	(1)
2022–2025	→ Lanús II	10	(9)
2025	→ Anorthosis Famagusta (loan)	4	(0)
2026–	→ Rhode Island FC (loan)	21	(0)

International career
- Argentina U15
	Argentina U20	6	(0)
- * Club domestic league appearances and goals as of 15:15, 8 November 2026 (UTC)

Agustín Javier "Pity" Rodríguez (born 2 May 2004) is an Argentine footballer currently playing as a midfielder for Rhode Island FC, on loan from Lanús.

== Career statistics ==
=== Club ===
As of 27 October 2021.

Club	Season	League			Cup		Continental		Other		Total	
Club	Season	Division	Apps	Goals	Apps	Goals	Apps	Goals	Apps	Goals	Apps	Goals
Lanús	2021	Argentine Primera División	4	0	0	0	2 (Note: Appearances in the Copa Sudamericana)	0	0	0	6	0
Career total			4	0	0	0	2	0	0	0	6	0
