= Juan Carlos Obregón =

Honduran footballer (born 1997)

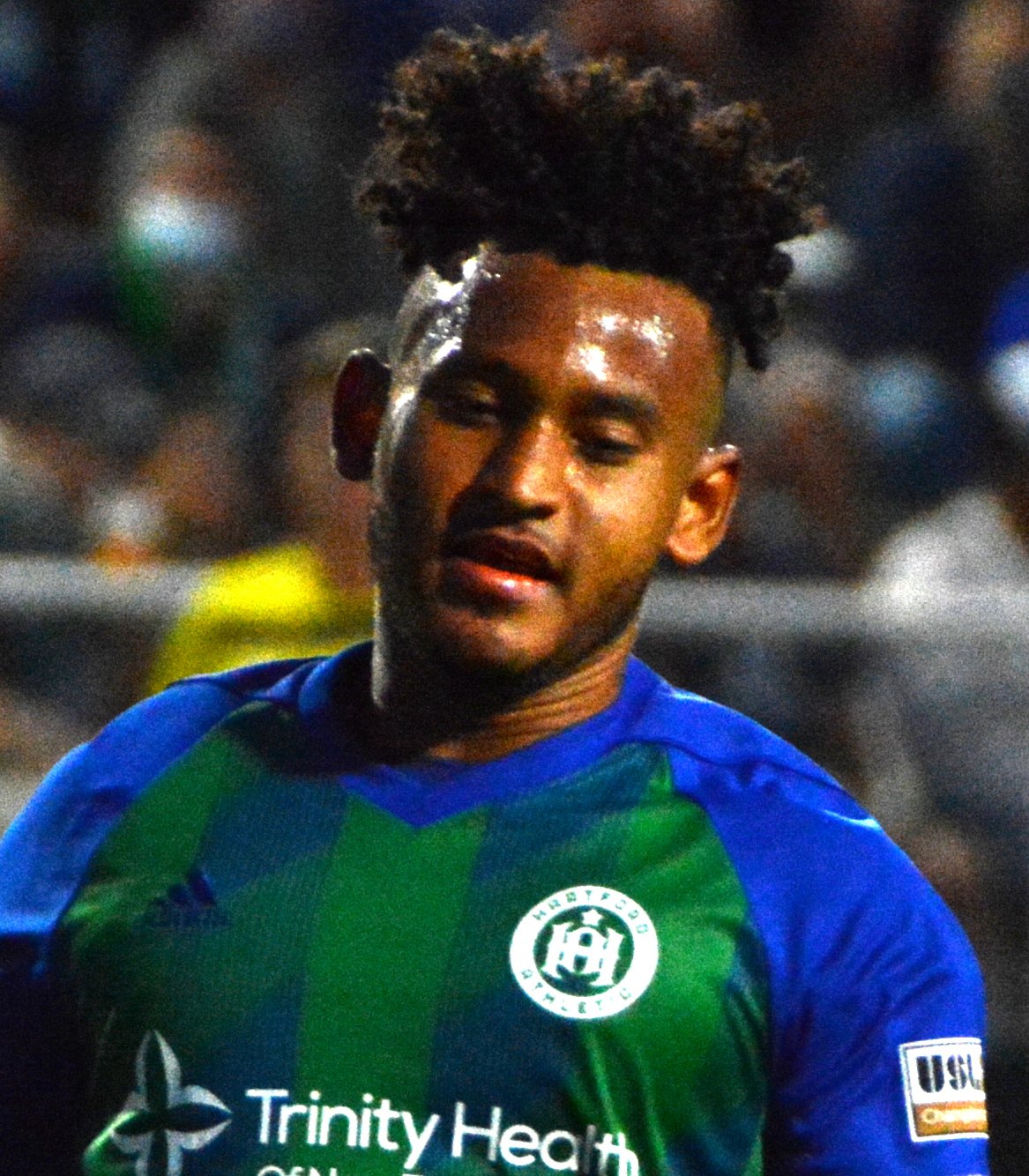
- Obregón with Hartford Athletic in 2021

Personal information
- Full name: Juan Carlos Obregón Jr.
- Date of birth: 29 October 1997 (age 29)
- Place of birth: New York City, U.S.
- Height: 1.75 m (5 ft 9 in)
- Position: Forward

Team information
- Current team: Brooklyn FC
- Number: 29

Youth career
- Metropolitan Oval Academy
- –2015: LIAC New York
- 2017–2018: Necaxa

College career
Years	Team	Apps	(Gls)
2015–2016	Siena Saints	39	(5)

Senior career*
Years	Team	Apps	(Gls)
2016	F.A. Euro	13	(7)
2019–2020	Rio Grande Valley FC	17	(4)
2021–2022	Hartford Athletic	53	(15)
2023	Motagua	7	(1)
2023	Pittsburgh Riverhounds	12	(3)
2024	Charlotte Independence	20	(15)
2025	Westchester SC	29	(17)
2026–	Brooklyn FC	29	(5)

International career^{‡}
2021	Honduras U23	6	(2)
2024–	Honduras	1	(0)
- * Club domestic league appearances and goals as of October 27, 2026 ‡ National team caps and goals as of July 25, 2021

Juan Carlos Obregón Jr. (born 29 October 1997) is a professional footballer who plays as a forward for USL Championship club Brooklyn FC. Born in the United States, he represents the Honduras national team.

== Early life ==
Obregón Jr. was born in New York, New York to Juan and Maria, both immigrants from Honduras.

== Career ==
=== College, amateur and youth ===
Obregón Jr. played two years of college soccer at Siena College between 2015 and 2016. While at college, he also appeared for USL PDL side F.A. Euro in 2016. While at Sienna, Obregón Jr. played with Conor McGlynn who would also be his teammate with Hartford Athletic and Westchester SC.

Following college, Obregón Jr. joined Liga MX side Necaxa. During his time with their Under-20 side, Obregón Jr. netted 6 goals in 24 appearances.

=== Professional ===
==== Rio Grande Valley ====
In September 2019, Obregón Jr. signed with USL Championship side Rio Grande Valley FC.

==== Hartford Athletic ====
In April 2021, Obregón Jr. signed with USL Championship side Hartford Athletic for the 2021 USL Championship season. He set a club record in 2021 with ten goals in a season.

==== Motagua and Pittsburgh Riverhounds ====
On July 5, 2023, Obregón Jr. signed with USL Championship side Pittsburgh Riverhounds SC for the remainder of their 2023 season following a brief spell in Honduras with Motagua during their Clausura season. Obregón Jr. debuted against Detroit City FC which resulted in a 2–0 win. He scored his first goal with the Hounds against Memphis 901 FC. His goal gave his team the lead which would allow them to win the game 4–2. Following the Players' Shield winning campaign, Obregon's 2024 option was not picked up, and he became a free agent.

==== Charlotte Independence ====
On 20 March 2024, Obregón Jr. joined USL League One club Charlotte Independence. Obregon scored his first goal of the season from long-range against Greenville Triumph SC, helping Charlotte Independence get a 1–0 win.

==== Westchester SC ====
On 30 January 2025, USL League One club Westchester SC signed Obregón Jr. ahead of their first-ever season. Despite the team struggling in their first ever season Obregon won the 2025 USL League One Golden Boot Award finishing the league season with 17 goals. He was selected for the 2025 All USL League One first team for his performance.

==== Brooklyn FC ====
On 16 January 2026, Obregón Jr. signed for USL Championship expansion club Brooklyn FC.

== International ==
In 2017 he was with the Honduran U-20 team but did not make an appearance while at the 2017 CONCACAF U-20 Championship.

Obregón Jr. made his first appearance for the Honduran U-23 team in the 2020 CONCACAF Men's Olympic Qualifying Championship in March 2021, coming on in the second half of Honduras's 3–0 win over Haiti. Obregón Jr. scored Honduras's opening goal to help the team defeat USA and qualify for the Summer Olympics.

In Obregon's Olympic debut, he was instrumental in Honduras' comeback win over New Zealand, scoring the equalizing goal in an eventual 3–2 victory.
