= Brooklyn FC (2026) =

Professional soccer club in New York City

Brooklyn FC (Men)
- Full name: Brooklyn Football Club
- Short name: Brooklyn FC, BKFC
- Founded: June 8, 2023; 3 years ago
- Ground: Maimonides Park; Brooklyn, New York City
- Capacity: 7,000
- Owner: North Sixth Group
- Sporting Director: Brian McBride
- Coach: Marlon LeBlanc
- League: USL Championship
- Website: brooklynfootballclub.com
Home colors	Away colors

Brooklyn Football Club is an American professional soccer club based in Brooklyn, New York City, that competes in the USL Championship (USLC). Founded in 2023, the club began play in 2026, and has fielded a women's team in the USL Super League (USLS) since 2024.

== History ==
On June 8, 2023, the United Soccer League announced that North Sixth Group had been granted a USL League One expansion team in Brooklyn, to start play in the 2025 season, with a women's and youth team to follow.

North Sixth Group specializes in purchasing and developing lower-tier soccer clubs. In addition to Brooklyn FC, it owns fifth-tier Swiss club FC Locarno, Serie C side ASD Campobasso 1919, and a stake in Serie C club Ascoli Calcio. USMNT International Timothy Weah joined the ownership group on May 28, 2024.

The men's team was announced to begin in the third division USL League One in 2025, with an option to move up to the second-division USL Championship by 2028, if certain benchmarks were met. On March 7, 2024, New York City-based soccer outlet Hudson River Blue reported that the team would, in a change of plans, begin directly in the USL Championship for the 2025 season, which was confirmed by USL a week later. In December 2024, that debut was pushed back to the 2026 season.

On 8 December 2025, the club announced the appointment of Marlon LeBlanc, formerly head coach with Philadelphia Union II, as first head coach of its men's team for the inaugural season.

== Colors and badge ==
The club's name and logo, designed by British-based designer Christopher Payne, were unveiled on November 9, 2023. The limestone color is a reference to the Brooklyn Bridge which is represented in the logo, and the brown color reflects the brownstone buildings seen across the borough.

The badge and identity will be used by all Brooklyn FC teams. The club originally announced a kit deal with Kappa, but after the ownership group acquired a stake in manufacturer Diaza, the contract was transferred.

=== Sponsorship ===
Period	Kit manufacturer	Shirt sponsor	Back sponsor	Sleeve sponsor
2024–2025	Diaza	Liquid Death	The Perecman Firm	N/A
2026-present	New Balance	Electrolit	N/A	N/A

== Players and staff ==
=== Roster ===
As of September 14, 2026

Note: Flags indicate national team as defined under FIFA eligibility rules; some limited exceptions apply. Players may hold more than one non-FIFA nationality.

No.	Pos.	Nation	Player
1	GK	AUS	Jackson Lee
3	DF	BRA	Gabriel Alves
4	DF	CAN	Rocco Romeo
5	MF	USA	Malik Pinto
6	DF	USA	Vuk Latinovich
7	MF	USA	Tommy McNamara
8	MF	USA	Johnny Klein
9	FW	CAN	Shaan Hundal
11	MF	PUR	Jaden Servania
13	DF	JPN	So Nishikawa
19	FW	USA	Stefan Stojanovic

No.	Pos.	Nation	Player
21	MF	USA	Anthony Fontana
23	DF	NIR	Ryan McLaughlin
24	DF	ENG	Callum Frogson
27	MF	USA	Peter Mangione
29	FW	HON	JC Obregón
30	GK	USA	Lukas Burns
56	FW	USA	CJ Olney (on loan from Philadelphia Union)
86	MF	JPN	Taimu Okiyoshi
92	DF	GUF	Thomas Vancaeyezeele
95	MF	FRA	Abdoulaye Kanté
98	FW	USA	Pierre da Silva

As of October 14, 2025

Position	Staff
Head coach	Marlon LeBlanc

=== Club captains ===
Years	Name	Nation
2026–present	Tommy McNamara	United States

== Academy ==
On December 7, 2023, Brooklyn FC announced that Two Bridges Football Club, a New York City-based youth soccer organization, would become the club's official youth academy and would start playing in the USL Academy League in 2024. Maximilian Mansfield, the executive director of Two Bridges, was named president and CEO of Brooklyn FC. As of October 2024, Mansfield is no longer the CEO nor President of Brooklyn FC.

The academy's U23 team started play in the semi-professional United Premier Soccer League (UPSL) 2024 as Brooklyn FC II.

On June 12, 2024, the club announced that its U20 academy side would play an exhibition match against Ecuadorian Serie A club C.D. Cuenca on July 13.

== Stadium ==
On January 19, 2024, it was reported that Brooklyn FC plan to play their matches at Maimonides Park in the Coney Island neighborhood of Brooklyn. That was confirmed by the league on January 31, announcing that the team had signed a multi-year deal.

Maimonides Park is a 7,000-seat stadium on the Coney Island Boardwalk. It had briefly been the home of the second New York Cosmos in 2017, prior to that club going on hiatus. Brooklyn FC intends to use a different field orientation than the Cosmos previously used, leaving the pitcher's mound intact and "maximiz(ing) a lot of the space around the field".

Before the women's opener in 2024, the club cited issues with the soccer turf installation that necessitated moving their first seven home matches to Rocco B. Commisso Soccer Stadium at Columbia University.

The club has had preliminary conversations with city officials and private developers on a location for a permanent stadium.
