= Leo Afonso =

Brazilian footballer (born 2001)

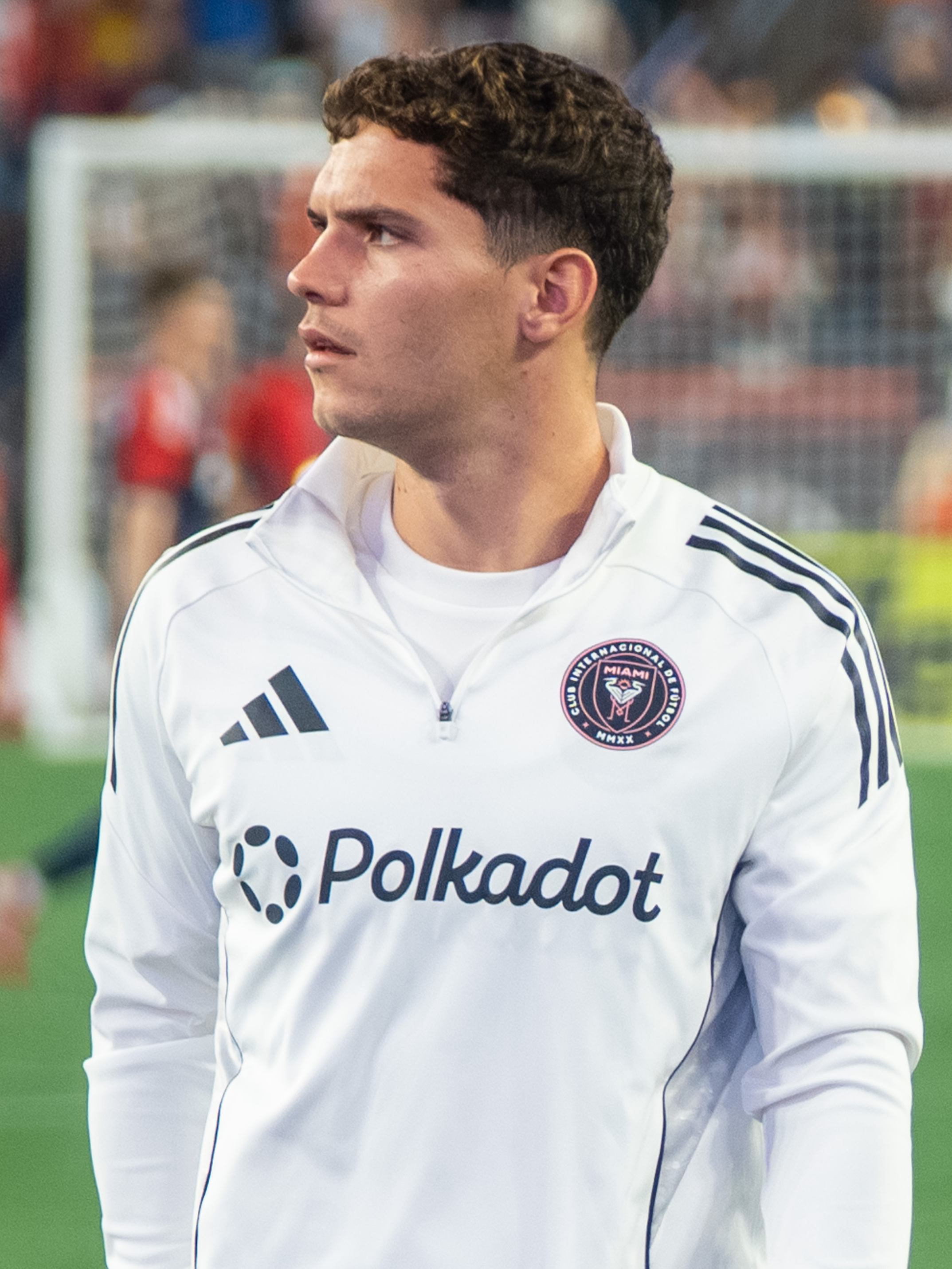
- Afonso with Inter Miami in 2025

Personal information
- Full name: Leonardo Frugis Afonso
- Date of birth: 13 July 2001 (age 25)
- Place of birth: São Paulo, Brazil
- Height: 1.76 m (5 ft 9 in)
- Position: Forward

Team information
- Current team: Rhode Island FC
- Number: 8

Youth career
- 2016–2018: Boca United FC
- 2018–2019: Philadelphia Union
- 2019–2020: Inter Miami

College career
Years	Team	Apps	(Gls)
2020–2023	Virginia Cavaliers	59	(22)

Senior career*
Years	Team	Apps	(Gls)
2024–2025	Inter Miami II	9	(7)
2024–2025	Inter Miami	14	(2)
2025	Atlanta United	3	(0)
2025	Atlanta United 2	2	(1)
2026–	Rhode Island FC	28	(4)
- * Club domestic league appearances and goals as of 15:15, 8 November 2026 (UTC)~

Leonardo Frugis Afonso (born 13 July 2001) is a Brazilian professional footballer who plays as a forward for Rhode Island FC in the USL Championship.

== Early life ==
Born in Brazil, Afonso moved to the United States at a young age and was raised in Boca Raton, Florida. He began playing football with the Miami-based club Boca United FC from 2016 to 2018. He followed that up with year long stints at Philadelphia Union, followed by Inter Miami. For college, he joined the Virginia Cavaliers in 2020.

== Club career ==
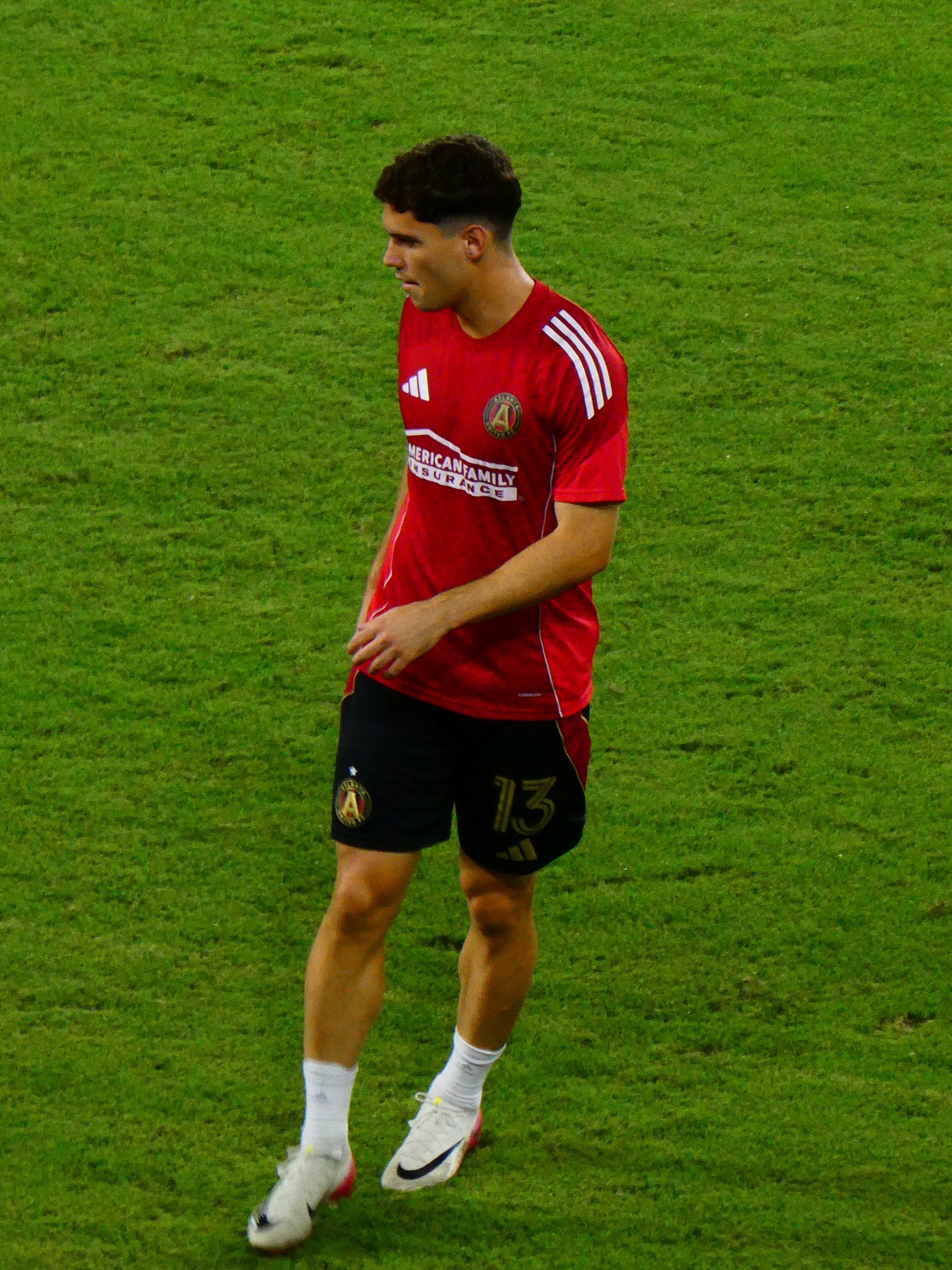
Afonso with Atlanta United in 2025

He was selected by Inter Miami in the second round of the 2024 MLS SuperDraft on 19 December 2023. he subsequently signed with the second team (Inter Miami II) for the 2024 season. On 23 March 2024, he signed with the senior Inter Miami team on a short-term loan for a Major League Soccer match. He made his senior MLS debut with Inter Miami as a late substitute in a 4–0 loss to New York Red Bulls on 23 March 2024, having made his professional debut in a 2 goal outing on 17 March 2023 with IMCF II. On 30 March 2024, he signed on another short-term loan with Inter Miami. On 2 April 2024, he signed a one-year contract with the club with club options from 2025 to 2027.

On 27 July 2025, Afonso was traded by Inter Miami to Atlanta United. Inter Miami received $50,000 in conditional performance based general allocation money and an international roster spot while Atlanta United received $225K in general allocation money.

On 8 January 2026, Afonso signed with USL Championship side Rhode Island FC on a one-year deal.

== Honours ==
Inter Miami

- Supporters' Shield: 2024
