= Marlon LeBlanc =

American soccer coach (born 1976)

Personal information
- Date of birth: October 6, 1976 (age 50)
- Place of birth: New York City, New York, U.S.
- Position: Defender

College career
Years	Team	Apps	(Gls)
1994	Penn State Nittany Lions		

Managerial career
- 2001–2005: Penn State Nittany Lions (assistant)
- 2006–2019: West Virginia Mountaineers
- 2020–2024: Philadelphia Union II
- 2025–: United States U18
- 2025–: Brooklyn FC

Marlon LeBlanc (born October 6, 1976) is an American soccer coach, currently head coach with Brooklyn FC men's team, who play their inaugural season in the USLC in 2026.

== Career ==
Raised in East Windsor, New Jersey, LeBlanc played prep soccer at Hightstown High School before playing for the Penn State Nittany Lions men's soccer team.

He was formerly the head men's soccer coach at West Virginia University and was named 2006 Soccer America Coach of the Year, leading the team to a 15–3–3 record. LeBlanc led the Mountaineers to six NCAA tournament appearances, including a Sweet Sixteen appearance in 2007, one BIG EAST Championship and two MAC Championships. He previously served as an assistant coach at Penn State University from 2001 to 2005, leading the program as interim head coach for seven games in 2002. As an assistant, Penn State went to four out of five NCAA tournaments.

On 8 December 2025, Brooklyn FC announced the appointment of LeBlanc as first head coach of its men's team for the inaugural 2026 season.

== Collegiate head coaching record ==
Year	Team	Record				Postseason
Year	Team	W	L	D	Win %	Postseason
2002	Penn State (interim)	4	3	0	.571	
2006	West Virginia	15	3	3	.786	NCAA 2nd Round
2007	West Virginia	14	6	2	.682	NCAA Sweet 16
2008	West Virginia	5	9	5	.395	
2009	West Virginia	7	5	6	.555	
2010	West Virginia	11	8	2	.571	NCAA 2nd Round
2011	West Virginia	11	8	1	.571	NCAA 2nd Round
2012	West Virginia	9	6	2	.600	
2013	West Virginia	7	7	5	.500	
2014	West Virginia	11	7	1	.611	
2015	West Virginia	7	12	0	.368	
2016	West Virginia	8	7	1	.531	
2017	West Virginia	9	6	4	.579	
2018	West Virginia	14	7	0	.667	NCAA 2nd Round
2019	West Virginia	10	9	2	.524	NCAA 2nd Round
Total		142	103	34	.570	6 NCAA appearances

== Professional head coaching record ==
Year	Team	Record				Postseason
Year	Team	W	L	D	Win %	Postseason
2020	Philadelphia Union II	2	7	2	.272	
2021	Philadelphia Union II	0	0	0	.000	
2022	Philadelphia Union II	11	9	4	.542	Conference semifinals
2023	Philadelphia Union II	12	12	4	.500	Conference playoffs
2024	Philadelphia Union II	15	9	4	.607	Eastern Conference Champions/MLS NextPro Cup Finals
Total		40	37	15	0.516	
