= 2026 Richmond Kickers season =

Richmond Kickers
2026 season
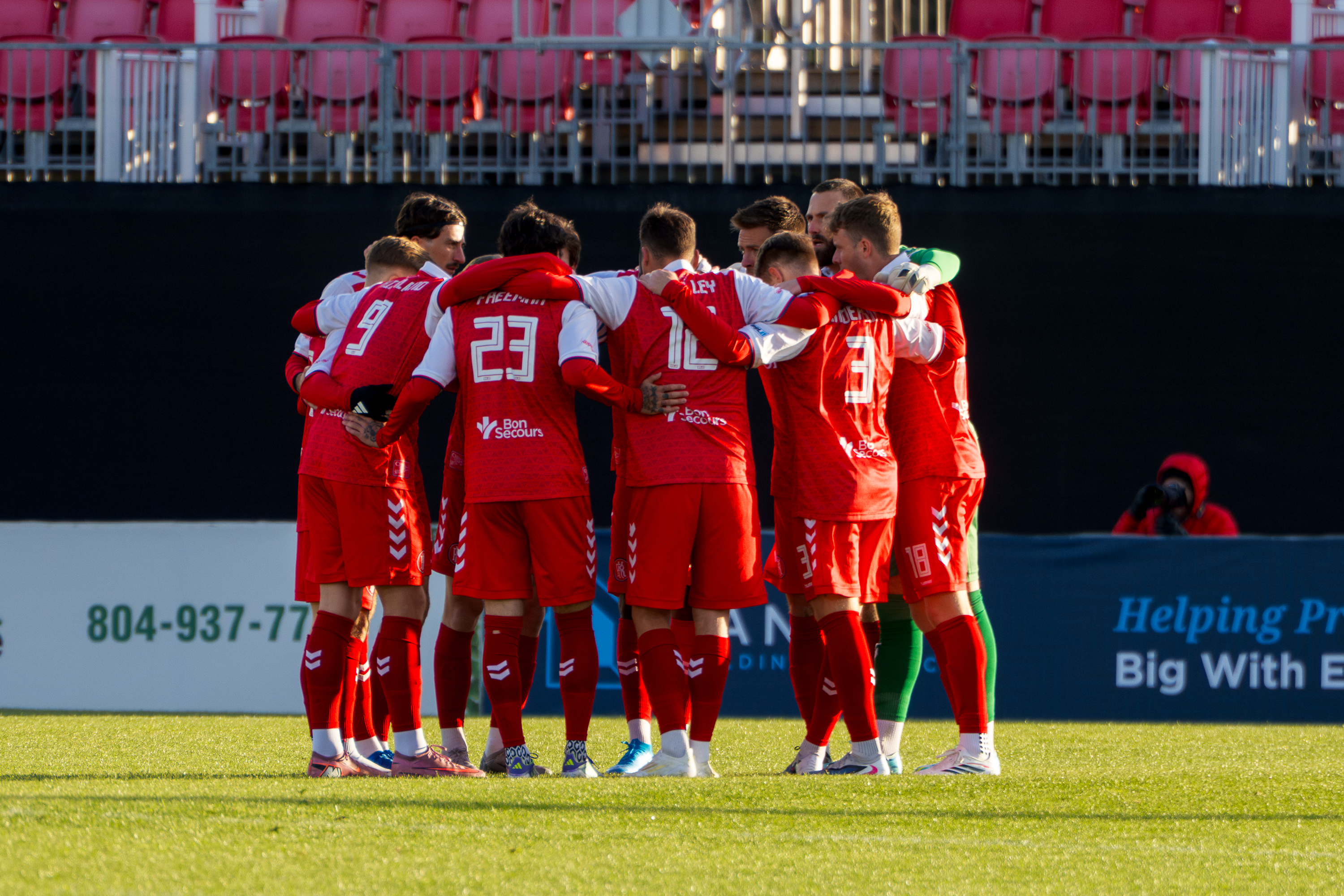
- The Kickers before the start of their U.S. Open Cup match against NoVA FC in March 2026
- Chairman: 22 Holdings, LLC
- Manager: Darren Sawatzky (until 15 June); Brian Ownby (interim; from 15 June)
- Stadium: City Stadium
- USL League One: 17th
- U.S. Open Cup: Round of 32
- Prinx Tigres Cup: Group stage
- Top goalscorer: League: Tarik Pannholzer (8); All: Tarik Pannholzer (8)
Home colours	Away colours	Third colours

The 2026 Richmond Kickers season was the club's 34th season in existence, their eighth season in USL League One, and their 22nd season in the third tier of American soccer.

The Kickers were initially led by seventh-year head coach, Darren Sawatzky until June 15, where he parted ways with the club to manage USL League One expansion club, Sporting Cascades FC.

This was the first season since 2019 without Emiliano Terzaghi, who transferred to Portland Hearts of Pine, after playing for the Kickers for five seasons. This will also be the first season since 2021 without Simon Fitch and Chandler O'Dwyer who transferred to Spokane Velocity and Sarasota Paradise respectively.

The Kickers did worse in their regular season than their previous season, finishing last in USL League One, and failed to qualify for the playoffs for the second consecutive season. 17th is also their worst position since their move to USL League One in 2019.

== Background ==
The 2025 season was the club's 33rd season of existence, their seventh season in USL League One, and sixth year under head coach Darren Sawatzky. The Kickers worsened from the previous season getting of 8 wins, seventeen losses, and five draws. With Darwin Espinal being the top goalscorer with nine goals.They failed to reach league playoffs for the first time since 2023 by finishing in 13th.

Outside of USL League One, the Kickers participated in the U.S. Open Cup and the USL Cup. The Kickers lost the first round in the U.S. Open Cup losing to National Premier Soccer League club Virginia Dream 3–0 and were also eliminated in the group stage of the USL Cup.

== Players and staff ==
=== Current roster ===
As of November 10, 2026

Note: Flags indicate national team as defined under FIFA eligibility rules; some limited exceptions apply. Players may hold more than one non-FIFA nationality.

No.	Pos.	Nation	Player
1	GK	CAN	Yann Fillion
2	DF	USA	Dakota Barnathan
3	MF	USA	Hayden Anderson
4	DF	AUS	Sam Layton
5	DF	USA	Ethan Kos
6	DF	USA	Ali Sasankhah
7	MF	USA	Landon Johnson
9	FW	USA	Josh Kirkland
10	MF	GER	Nils Seufert
11	FW	GER	Tarik Pannholzer
12	FW	USA	Owen O'Malley
13	GK	USA	Alex Wintsch
14	FW	USA	Zahir Vazquez

No.	Pos.	Nation	Player
18	MF	USA	Austin Amer
19	FW	HON	Darwin Espinal
22	DF	USA	Sean Vinberg
23	FW	USA	Tyler Freeman
26	DF	NGR	Mujeeb Murana
32	MF	USA	Matt Bolduc
34	DF	USA	Beckett Howell
35	GK	USA	James Sneddon
43	DF	USA	Greyson Cadjoe
44	DF	USA	Axel Gallegos
45	DF	USA	Harold Hanson
70	FW	BRA	Lucca Dourado
99	DF	USA	Daniel Moore

2026 Richmond Kickers managers

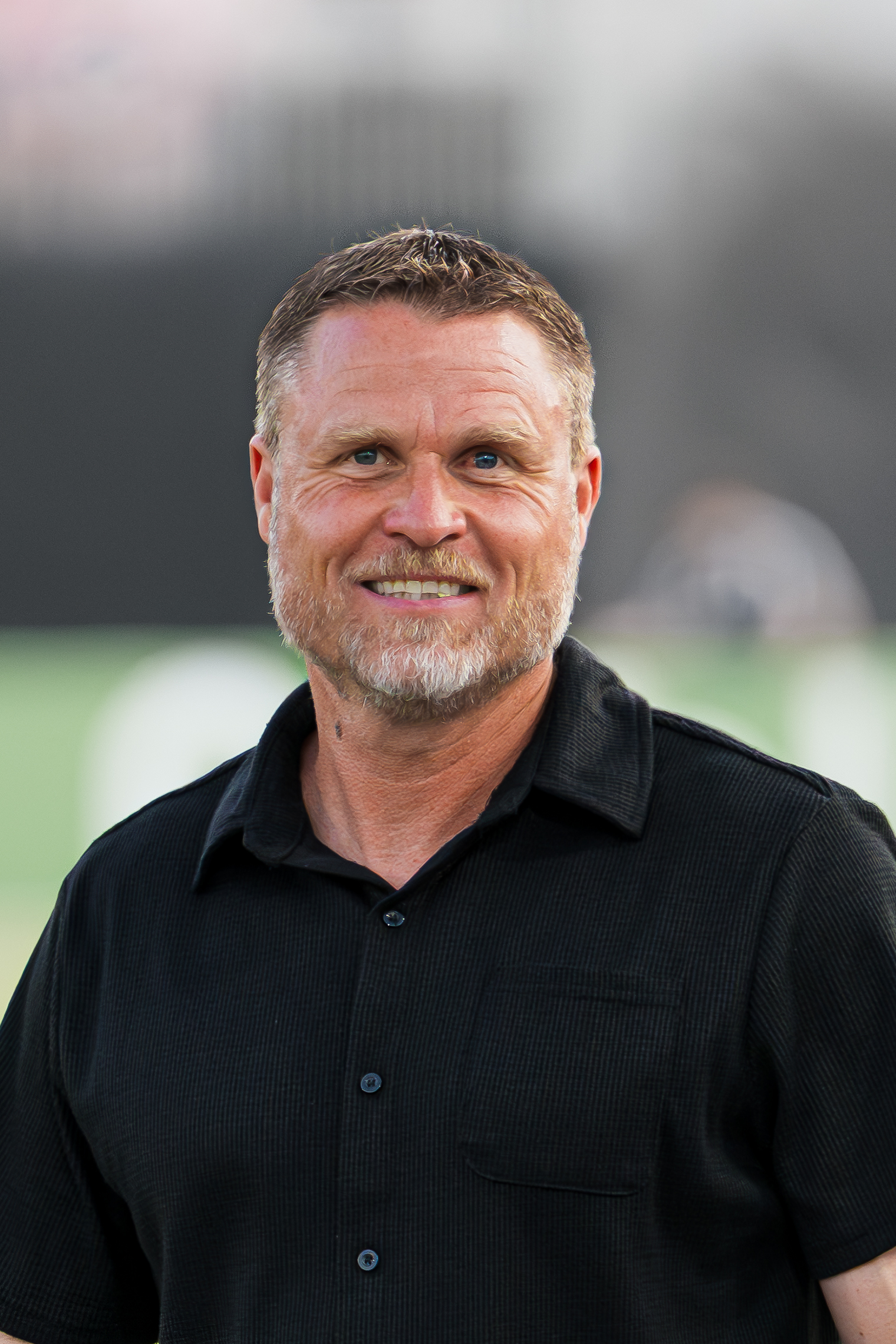
Darren Sawatzky who was appointed on 6 November 2019, parted ways with the club on 15 June 2026 after a poor performance in the 2025 and 2026 seasons as well as USL League One expansion club, Sporting Cascades buying his buyout clause

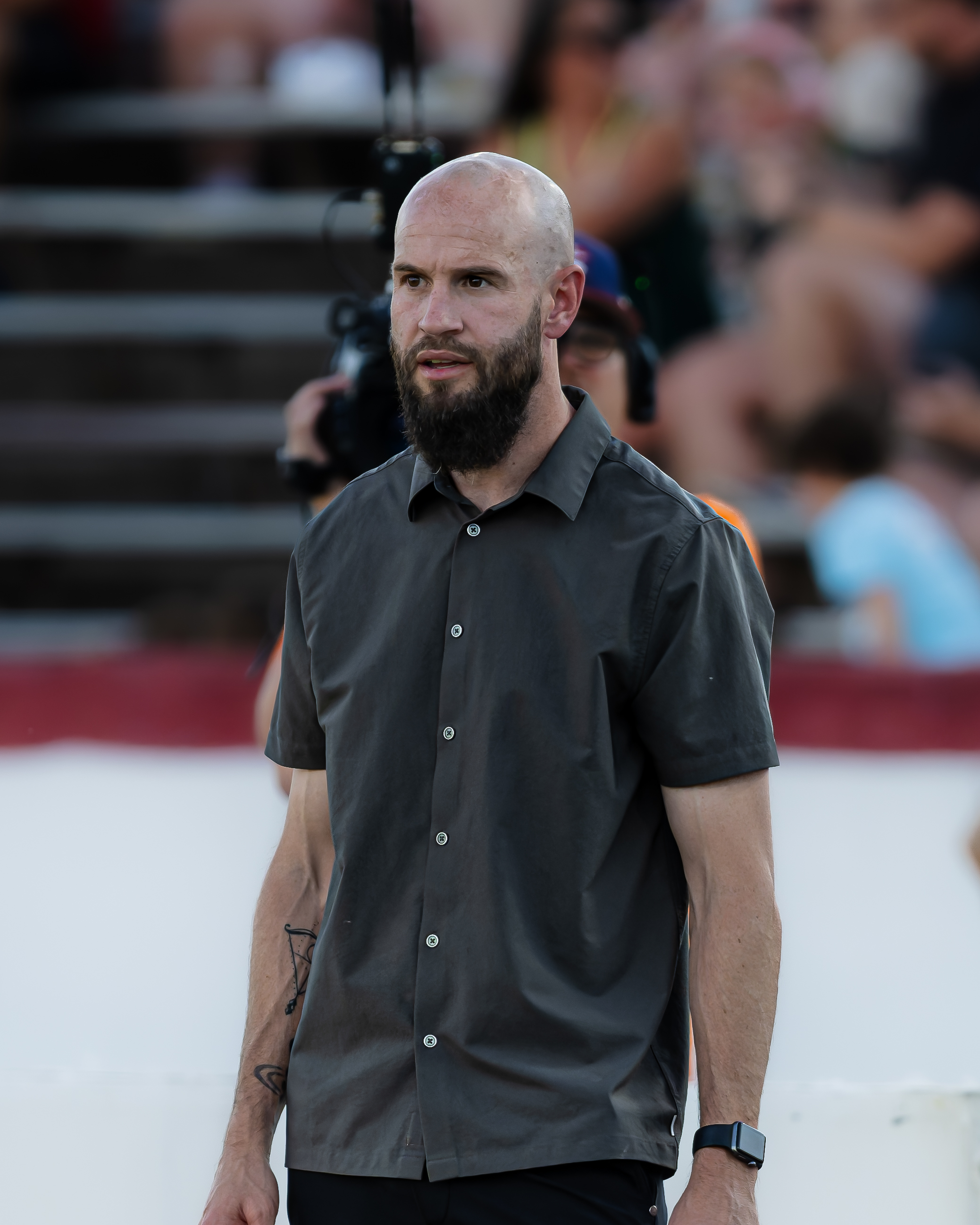
Brian Ownby who was appointed assistant manager by Sawatzky on 6 January 2026, stepped up to take charge as interim manager for the Kickers

=== Techinal staff ===
Position	Name
Interim Head Coach	Brian Ownby
Interim Assistant Coach	Evan Munn
Assistant Coach	Mac Phillips

== Techinical staff changes ==
The Kickers were initially led by Darren Sawatzky until he parted ways with the club to manage USL League One expansion club, Sporting Cascades FC, after managing the club for six and a half seasons.

After Sawatzky left the club, Brian Ownby a former Richmond Kickers player who played for the club on loan in the 2013 season and would later play for them in the 2015 and 2016 seasons, as well as being appointed as assistant manager by Sawatzky in January 2026, took over on an interim basis on June 15, following Sawatzky's departure, this marks the first season, that a Kickers manager left mid-season.

== Transfers ==
=== Transfers in ===
Date	Position	No.	Name	From	Fee	Ref.
December 2, 2025	FW	11	(Germany) Tarik Pannholzer	(Germany) Weiche Flensburg	Free	
December 4, 2025	DF	26	(Nigeria) Mujeeb Murana	(United States) Miami FC	Free	
December 9, 2025	DF	5	(United States) Ethan Kos	(United States) Birmingham Legion	Free	
December 11, 2025	GK	1	(Canada) Yann Fillion	(Malta) Floriana	Free	
December 17, 2025	DF	4	(Australia) Sam Layton	(Australia) GC Knights	Free	
December 18, 2025	DF	99	(United States) Daniel Moore	(United States) Crown Legacy	Free	
January 7, 2026	MF	18	(United States) Austin Amer	None	Free	
January 8, 2026	DF	12	(United States) Owen O'Malley	(United States) Vermont Green	Free	
January 13, 2026	DF	22	(United States) Sean Vinberg	(United States) Portland Hearts of Pine	Free	
January 14, 2026	FW	23	(United States) Tyler Freeman	(New Zealand) Western Suburbs	Free	
February 19, 2026	DF	44	(United States) Axel Gallegos	(United States) Richmond United	Academy contract	
February 19, 2026	GK	13	(United States) Alex Wintsch	(United States) Richmond United	Academy contract	
March 3, 2026	FW	70	(Brazil) Lucca Dourado	(United States) Birmingham Legion	Free	
March 6, 2026	MF	6	(United States) Ali Sasankhah	(United States) Sacramento State Hornets	Free	
April 23, 2026	DF	24	(United States) Josh Erlandson	(United States) Loudoun United	25-Day contract	
July 2, 2026	MF	32	(United States) Matt Bolduc	(United States) Sarasota Paradise	Free	
July 17, 2026	FW	14	(United States) Zahir Vazquez	(United States) Valley 559 FC	Free	
July 21, 2026	DF	45	(United States) Harold Hanson	(Germany) Eintracht Nordhorn	Free	
September 10, 2026	DF	43	(United States) Greyson Codjoe	(United States) Richmond United	Academy contract	

=== Transfers out ===
Date	Position	No.	Name	To	Fee	Ref.
November 12, 2025	DF	39	(United States) Brendan Dobzyniak	(United States) VCU Rams	Free (Note: Expired USL academy contract.)	
November 12, 2025	MF	42	(United States) Grafton Kahl	(United States) West Virginia Mountaineers	Free	
November 12, 2025	FW	40	(United States) Nick Sarrantakos	(United States) High Point Panthers	Free	
November 30, 2025	GK	1	(Chile) Pablo Jara	Unattached	Free	
November 30, 2025	DF	25	(United States) Marcelo Lage	(United States) New York Cosmos	Free	
November 30, 2025	DF	14	(Brazil) Guilherme Franca	(Brazil) Sampaio Corrêa	Free	
November 30, 2025	DF	16	(Canada) Klaidi Cela	(Albania) KF Skënderbeu	Option declined	
November 30, 2025	DF	4	(United States) Simon Fitch	(United States) Spokane Velocity	Free	
November 30, 2025	DF	5	(Chile) Maxi Schenfeld	Unattached	Free	
November 30, 2025	DF	6	(United States) Ryan Baer	(United States) Tacoma Defiance	End of loan	
November 30, 2025	MF	11	(Haiti) Rivendi Pierre-Lewis	(United States) FC Motown	Option declined	
November 30, 2025	MF	17	(England) James Vaughan	(United States) Chattanooga Red Wolves	Free	
November 30, 2025	MF	20	(Germany) Adrian Billhardt	(United States) Union Omaha	Free	
November 30, 2025	MF	33	(United States) Matt Bolduc	(United States) Sarasota Paradise	Free	
November 30, 2025	FW	27	(England) Chandler O'Dwyer	(United States) Sarasota Paradise	Option declined	
November 30, 2025	FW	32	(Argentina) Emiliano Terzaghi	(United States) Portland Hearts of Pine	Free	
December 1, 2025	MF	18	(Uganda) Jonathan Kanagwa	(United States) Charlottesville Blues FC	Option declined	
February 12, 2026	DF	38	(United States) Griffin Garnett	(Hungary) Ferencvárosi TC II	Free	
May 18, 2026	DF	24	(United States) Josh Erlandson	Unattached	Free	
August 1, 2026	MF	41	(United States) Andrew Richman	(United States) Georgetown Hoyas	Free	

Transfer notes

== Non-competitive ==
=== Friendlies ===
February 2 Friendly	(United States) Pittsburgh Riverhounds	2–0	Richmond Kickers (United States)	Coraopolis, PA
5:00 p.m. EDT	Larsen 72', 78'	Report		Stadium: AHN Health + Sports Medicine Center Montour

February 7 Friendly	(United States) Loudoun United	3–1	Richmond Kickers (United States)	Leesburg, VA
TBD EDT		Report		Stadium: RavenTek Park

February 14 Friendly	(United States) Crown Legacy	0–0	Richmond Kickers (United States)	Matthews, NC
TBD EDT				Stadium: Sportsplex at Matthews

== Competitions ==
=== USL League One ===
==== Table ====
Pos	Team	Pld	W	L	T	GF	GA	GD	Pts
13	AV Alta FC	32	8	14	10	40	48	−8	34
14	Portland Hearts of Pine	32	8	14	10	48	58	−10	34
15	Greenville Triumph SC	32	8	18	6	37	60	−23	30
16	New York Cosmos	32	7	19	6	40	66	−26	27
17	Richmond Kickers	32	7	20	5	37	65	−28	26

Source: USL League One
Rules for classification: 1) points; 2) total wins; 3) total goal differential; 4) total goals scored; 5) points earned against top four finishers; 6) disciplinary points; 7) drawing of lots.

March 7 1	AV Alta	1–1	Richmond Kickers	Lancaster, CA
10:30 p.m. EDT	Desdunes 26' (pen.); Relerford (yellow card) 50'; Pehlivanov (yellow card) 90+4'	Report	Kirkland 9'; Barnathan (yellow card) 52'; Murana (yellow card) 74'	Stadium: Lancaster Municipal Stadium; Attendance: 4,508; Referee: Corbyn May

March 21 2	Richmond Kickers	0–1	FC Naples	Richmond, VA
6:00 p.m. EDT	Richman (red card) 43'; Kirkland (yellow card) 45'; Barnathan (yellow card) 45+6'; O'Malley (yellow card) 52'; Amer (yellow card) 63'; Layton (yellow card) 88'	Report	O'Connor 24'; Mastrantonio (yellow card) 74'	Stadium: City Stadium; Attendance: 5,494; Referee: Joe Surgant

March 27 3	One Knoxville	1–0	Richmond Kickers	Knoxville, TN
7:00 p.m. EDT	Diene (yellow card) 34'; Rodrigues (yellow card) 45'; Skelton (yellow card) 45+2'; Zarokostas (yellow card) 67'; Krioutchenkov 85'; Murphy (yellow card) 90+1'	Report	Pannholzer (yellow card) 26'; Kirkland (yellow card) 53'; Sasankhah (yellow card) 89'	Stadium: Covenant Health Park; Attendance: 2,251; Referee: Kevin Broadley

April 4 4	Richmond Kickers	v	Tormenta	Richmond, VA
6:00 p.m. EDT				Stadium: City Stadium
Note: Game cancelled following South Georgia Tormenta FC's withdrawal from USL League One.

April 11 5	Spokane Velocity	3–1	Richmond Kickers	Spokane, WA
9:30 p.m. EDT	Alexandre 11'; Denton 16'; John-Brown 57'; Fernandez (yellow card) 79'	Report	Pannholzer 34'	Stadium: One Spokane Stadium; Attendance: 1,756; Referee: Edson Carvajal

April 18 6	Richmond Kickers	2–1	Union Omaha	Richmond, VA
6:00 p.m. EDT	Espinal 6', (yellow card) 50'; Pannholzer 57'; Fillion (yellow card) 82'	Report	Kallman 21'; Cabral (yellow card) 75'; Orson (yellow card) 88' (yellow-red card) 90+9'	Stadium: City Stadium; Attendance: 3,970; Referee: John Matto

May 1 7	Richmond Kickers	1–0	Westchester	Richmond, VA
7:00 p.m. EDT	Kirkland 14'; Layton (yellow card) 35'; O'Malley (yellow card) 37'; Sasankhah (yellow card) 45+3'; Anderson (yellow card) 51'; Pannholzer (yellow card) 57'; Seufert (yellow card) 83'; Fillion (yellow card) 90+4'	Report	Jennings (yellow card) 59'; Powder (yellow card) 60'	Stadium: City Stadium; Attendance: 4,609; Referee: Igor Bych

May 9 8	Greenville Triumph	0–3	Richmond Kickers	Mauldin, SC
7:00 p.m. EDT	Robles (yellow card) 13'; Liadi (yellow card) 81'	Report	Murana (yellow card) 15', (goal) 32'; O'Malley (yellow card) 26'; Dourado (yellow card) 50'; Pannholzer 70'; Johnson 78'; Layton (yellow card) 89'	Stadium: GE Vernova Park; Attendance: 2,018; Referee: Kevin Broadley

May 23 9	Tormenta	v	Richmond Kickers	Statesboro, GA
7:30 p.m. EDT				Stadium: Tormenta Stadium
Note: Game cancelled following South Georgia Tormenta FC's withdrawal from USL League One.

May 27 10	Chattanooga Red Wolves	5–0	Richmond Kickers	East Ridge, TN
7:00 p.m. EDT	Mensah 4', 81'; Gómez 11'; Adewole (yellow card) 27'; Lelin (yellow card) 27'; Bentley 48'; Hernandez 58'		Fillion (yellow card) 12'; Anderson (yellow card) 45+4'; Layton (yellow card) 61'; Barnathan (yellow card) 90+2'	Stadium: CHI Memorial Stadium; Attendance: 1,274; Referee: Izlen Peksenar

May 30 11	Richmond Kickers	2–2	Athletic Club Boise	Richmond, VA
7:00 p.m. EDT	Amer 22'; Dourado (yellow card) 29', (goal) 51'; Espinal (yellow card) 57'; Layton (yellow card) 69'; Anderson (yellow card) 73'; Sasankhah (yellow card) 82'	Report	Crull (yellow card) 33'; Bodily (yellow card) 75'; Kostyshyn 79'; Moon 86'	Stadium: City Stadium; Attendance: 4,207; Referee: Stephen Foster

June 10 12	Athletic Club Boise	2–1	Richmond Kickers	Boise, ID
9:30 p.m. EDT	Moshobane 3'; Mayaka (yellow card) 22'; Moon 42' (yellow card) 44' (yellow-red card) 45+1'; Miller (yellow card) 45+3'; Kliewer (yellow card) 89'	Report	Vinberg (yellow card) 19'; Amer (yellow card) 32'; Espinal (yellow card) 54'; Seufert 55' (yellow card) 56'; Kirkland (yellow card) 80'; Layton (yellow card) 82'	Stadium: Stadium at Expo Idaho; Attendance: 7,211; Referee: Atahan Yaya

June 13 13	Corpus Christi	1–0	Richmond Kickers	Corpus Christi, TX
8:30 p.m. EDT	Bowen (yellow card) 46'; Kwakwa (yellow card) 54'; Medina 73'; Talbot (yellow card) 90+3'	Report	Dourado (yellow card) 80'	Stadium: Cabaniss Athletic Complex; Attendance: 1,628; Referee: Muhammad Kaleia

June 20 14	Richmond Kickers	0–2	Fort Wayne	Richmond, VA
7:00 p.m. EDT	Barnathan (yellow card) 13'; Amer (yellow card) 63'		Thomas 17', (yellow card) 74'; Healy 39'; Dias (yellow card) 42'; Amas (yellow card) 65'; Becher (yellow card) 89'	Stadium: City Stadium; Attendance: 4,019; Referee: Lauren Aldrich

June 24 15	Portland Hearts of Pine	5–1	Richmond Kickers	Portland, ME
7:00 p.m. EDT	Green (yellow card) 15'; Gonzalez 19'; Morse 25'; Faye (yellow card) 25'; Wright 57', (yellow card) 60'; Georgallides 60'; Camara 70', 90+4'; Barbosa (yellow card) 89'	Report	Kirkland 25'; Fillion (yellow card) 25'; Amer (yellow card) 39'; Howell (yellow card) 87'	Stadium: Fitzpatrick Stadium; Attendance: 6,213; Referee: Jeremy Scheer

July 3 16	Richmond Kickers	0–0	Sarasota Paradise	Richmond, VA
7:30 p.m. EDT		Report	Bryant (yellow card) 60'; McLaughlin (yellow card) 81'	Stadium: City Stadium; Attendance: 3,132; Referee: Igor Bych

July 15 17	Forward Madison	4–0	Richmond Kickers	Madison, WI
8:00 p.m. EDT	Kerfalla Toure 30', 45+4'; Carmichael 60'; Gyamfri (yellow card) 63', (goal) 65'	Report	Fillion (yellow card) 19'; Barnathan (yellow card) 42'; O'Malley (yellow card) 43'; Pannholzer (yellow card) 45+2'; Anderson (yellow card) 46'; Howell (yellow card) 82'	Stadium: Breese Stevens Field; Attendance: 3,341; Referee: Laadi Issaka

July 18 18	Richmond Kickers	0–2	Spokane Velocity	Richmond, VA
7:00 p.m. EDT	O'Malley (yellow card) 57'	Report	Gallagos 10' (o.g.); Covi 30'; Vinyals (yellow card) 42'; Denton (yellow card) 90+5'	Stadium: City Stadium; Attendance: 3,043; Referee: Danielle Chesky

July 25 19	Charlotte Independence	3–1	Richmond Kickers	Charlotte, NC
7:00 p.m. EDT	Saydee 40'; Ngah 45+3'; Marou 58'	Report	Vinberg 75'	Stadium: American Legion Memorial Stadium; Attendance: 885; Referee: Atahan Yaya

August 1 20	Richmond Kickers	3–2	AV Alta	Richmond, VA
7:00 p.m. EDT	Freeman 22', (yellow card) 45+4'; O'Malley (yellow card) 64'; Vinberg (yellow card) 67'; Kirkland 75', (yellow card) 85'; Fillion (yellow card) 77'; Bolduc 79'	Report	Villalobos 48' (yellow card) 50'; Relerford (yellow card) 74'; Desdunes (yellow card) 84'; Acuña 87'	Stadium: City Stadium; Attendance: 3,866; Referee: José Lara

August 5 21	Richmond Kickers	2–0	New York Cosmos	Richmond, VA
7:00 p.m. EDT	O'Malley (yellow card) 12'; Espinal 33', 53'; Sasankhah (yellow card) 78'	Report	Spengler (yellow card) 45'; Bohui (yellow card) 57'; Galazzini (yellow card) 70'	Stadium: City Stadium; Attendance: 3,878; Referee: Anthony Sobolevsky

August 16 22	Union Omaha	5–1	Richmond Kickers	Omaha, NE
5:00 p.m. EDT	Navarro 28'; Gómez 28'; Vinberg 38' (o.g.); Owusu (yellow card) 39'; Vargas (yellow card) 41'; Gutierrez 67'; Cáceres (yellow card) 86'; Gavilanes 90'	Report	O'Malley (yellow card) 36'; Bolduc 43'	Stadium: Morrison Stadium; Attendance: 2,582; Referee: Braeden Frey

August 22 23	Richmond Kickers	1–1	Portland Hearts of Pine	Richmond, VA
7:00 p.m. EDT	Vazquez (yellow card) 29'; Espinal (yellow card) 66'; Kirkland 74'; Amer (yellow card) 85'	Report	Kidd 37'; Kamara (yellow card) 42'	Stadium: City Stadium; Attendance: 4,388; Referee: Alejo Calume

August 29 24	Richmond Kickers	1–2	Forward Madison	Richmond, VA
7:00 p.m. EDT	Freeman (yellow card) 64'; Anderson (yellow card) 90+1' (yellow-red card) 90+3'; Kirkland 90+6'	Report	Torres 2', (yellow card) 26'; Kanyane (yellow card) 12'; Munjoma 58'; N'goubou (yellow card) 90+1'	Stadium: City Stadium; Attendance: 4,520; Referee: Erick Lezama

September 2 25	Fort Wayne	2–0	Richmond Kickers	Fort Wayne, IN
7:30 p.m. EDT	Smith 45'; Dias (yellow card) 57'; Armas (yellow card) 62'; Thomas 75'	Report	Moore (yellow card) 27'; Layton (yellow card) 81'	Stadium: Fort Wayne FC Park; Attendance: 3109; Referee: Ryan Homik

September 12 26	Richmond Kickers	1–1	Chattanooga Red Wolves	Richmond, VA
6:00 p.m. EDT	Murana (yellow card) 1'; O'Malley (red card) 85'; Vazquez 90'	Report	Hernandez 2'; Vaughan (yellow card) 67'; Kelly-Rosales (yellow card) 73'; McManus (yellow card) 84'	Stadium: City Stadium; Attendance: 3,357; Referee: Nicholas Strednak

September 16 27	Westchester	5–2	Richmond Kickers	Mount Vernon, NY
7:00 p.m. EDT	Timchenko 14'; McGlynn 16', 34' (pen.); Jiménez 37', 39'	Report	Seufert (yellow card) 45+1', (goal) 48'; Pannholzer 51'; Murana (yellow card) 72'; Vazquez (yellow card) 77'; Bolduc (yellow card) 90+2'	Stadium: The Stadium at Memorial Field; Referee: William Hale

September 19 28	Richmond Kickers	1–2	Charlotte Independence	Richmond, VA
6:00 p.m. EDT	Pannholzer 11'; Freeman (yellow card) 44'; Hanson (yellow card) 72'; Sasankhah (yellow card) 80'	Report	O'Malley 8' (o.g.); Manin (yellow card) 15'; Skinner 42'; Romero (yellow card) 44'; Mazinga (yellow card) 67'; Dimick (yellow card) 73'; Amaya (yellow card) 90+2'	Stadium: City Stadium; Attendance: 3,954; Referee: Drew Klemp

September 26 29	New York Cosmos	3–2	Richmond Kickers	Paterson, NJ
5:00 p.m. EDT	Spengler 15', 90+5', (yellow card) 90+8'; Jawneh 21', (yellow card) 60'; Chilaka (yellow card) 62'; Ramos (yellow card) 74'	Report	O'Malley (yellow card) 18'; Vazquez 32'; Layton (yellow card) 41'; Vinberg (yellow card) 62', (goal) 66'; Hanson (yellow card) 89'; Dourado (yellow card) 90+3'	Stadium: Hinchliffe Stadium; Attendance: 820; Referee: Laadi Issaka

October 3 30	Richmond Kickers	3–2	One Knoxville	Richmond, VA
6:00 p.m. EDT	Barnathan 2'; Dourado 5'; Layton (yellow card) 55'; Freeman 72'	Report	Krioutchenkov 28'; Gøling 37'; Tiao (yellow card) 85'; Skelton (yellow card) 90+1'	Stadium: City Stadium; Attendance: 3,759; Referee: Benjamin Meyer

October 7 31	FC Naples	2–0	Richmond Kickers	Naples, FL
7:00 p.m. EDT	Miglietti 23', 67'; Udertiz (yellow card) 34'; Ciss (yellow card) 56'		Pannholzer (yellow card) 63'	Stadium: Paradise Coast Sports Complex Stadium

October 11 32	Sarasota Paradise	3–2	Richmond Kickers	Lakewood Ranch, FL
7:30 p.m. EDT	Kiingi 36'; Gall 54'; Brulinski (yellow card) 73'; Terzaghi 85', (yellow card) 85'		Dourado 23'; Amer 29'; Pannholzer (yellow card) 45+4'; Layton (yellow card) 61'; Vinberg (yellow card) 67'; Gallegos (yellow card) 78'	Stadium: Premier Sports Campus

October 17 33	Richmond Kickers	5–1	Corpus Christi	Richmond, VA
6:00 p.m. EDT	Pannholzer 45+5' (pen.), 52', 61'; Dourado 51'; O'Malley 74', (yellow card) 79'		Keaney (yellow card) 45+4'; Keegan 77'	Stadium: City Stadium

October 24 34	Richmond Kickers	0–1	Greenville Triumph	Richmond, VA
6:00 p.m. EDT	Sasankhah (yellow card) 30'; Barnathan (yellow card) 74'	Report	Robles 50'; Villanueva (yellow card) 70'; Azaad Liadi (red card)	Stadium: City Stadium

=== Group stage ===
Pos	Lg	Team	Pld	W	PKW	PKL	L	GF	GA	GD	Pts	Qualification
1	USL1	Charlotte Independence	4	2	2	0	0	6	4	+2	10	Advance to knockout stage
2	USLC	Charleston Battery	4	2	1	1	0	8	3	+5	9	
3	USLC	Pittsburgh Riverhounds SC	4	2	0	2	0	6	1	+5	8	
4	USL1	Greenville Triumph SC	4	1	0	0	3	4	7	−3	3	
5	USLC	Loudoun United FC	4	1	0	0	3	4	7	−3	3	
6	USL1	Richmond Kickers	4	1	0	0	3	3	9	−6	3	

Rules for classification: 1) points; 2) goals for in cup match play (only for determining wild card); 3) head-to-head points earned in small group play; 4) total wins in small group play; 5) total wins in all cup matches; 6) goals for in small group play; 7) goals for in cup match play; 8) goals assisted in cup match play; 9) goal differential in cup match play; 10) disciplinary points; 11) coin toss.

April 25 1	Richmond Kickers	1–2	Charlotte Independence	Richmond, VA
6:00 p.m. EDT	Anderson (yellow card) 59'; Layton 70'	Report	Martínez 10', 39'; Dimick (yellow card) 78'	Stadium: City Stadium; Attendance: 3,422; Referee: John Griggs

May 16 2	Richmond Kickers	0–4	Charleston Battery	Richmond, VA
7:00 p.m. EDT	Sasankhah (yellow card) 39'; Seufert (yellow card) 45+1'	Report	Messer (yellow card) 14'; Blackstock 20'; Swan 40'; Berry 69'; Kelly (yellow card) 45+1', (goal) 73'	Stadium: City Stadium; Attendance: 4,881; Referee: Benjamin Meyer

June 6 3	Loudoun United	2–0	Richmond Kickers	Leesburg, VA
6:00 p.m. EDT	Santos (yellow card) 45+6'; Akinyode (yellow card) 56'; Úlfarsson 68', 80'; Panayotou (yellow card) 85'	Report	Murana (yellow card) 15'; O'Malley (yellow card) 23'; Moore (yellow card) 44'; Anderson (yellow card) 59'; Layton (yellow card) 67'	Stadium: Segra Field; Attendance: 2,260; Referee: Carlos Rodriguez

July 11 4	Greenville Triumph	1–2	Richmond Kickers	Mauldin, SC
7:00 p.m. EDT	Meek (yellow card) 27', (goal) 30'; Agyaakwah (yellow card) 52'; White (yellow card) 53'	Report	Vinberg (yellow card) 22'; Richman (yellow card) 43'; Bubb 60' (o.g.); Murana (yellow card) 73'; Howell 80'; Anderson (yellow card) 87'	Stadium: GE Vernova Park; Attendance: 2,131; Referee: Daniel Emeri

=== U.S. Open Cup ===
March 17 First round	Richmond Kickers (USL1) (Virginia)	2–0	Northern Virginia FC (USL2)	Richmond, VA
6:30 p.m. EDT	Kirkland 31'; Dourado 89'; Murana (yellow card) 90+4'; Sasankhah (yellow card) 90+4'	Report	Silva (yellow card) 27'; Niblock (yellow card) 37'; Gold (yellow card) 43'; Dean (yellow card) 90+1'	Stadium: City Stadium; Attendance: 1,663; Referee: Chuck Roberts

April 1 Round two	Richmond Kickers (USL1) (Virginia)	1–0	(Virginia) Loudoun United (USLC)	Richmond, VA
6:30 p.m. EDT	Sasankhah (yellow card) 84'; Pannholzer (yellow card) 90+3'; Dourado 90+6'; Fillion (yellow card) 90+11'	Report	Dias (yellow card) 86'	Stadium: City Stadium; Attendance: 1,243; Referee: Matthew Corrigan

April 15 Round of 32	Richmond Kickers (USL1) (Virginia)	0–3	(Ohio) Columbus Crew (MLS)	Richmond, VA
TBD EDT	Barnathan (yellow card) 61'	Report	Picard 41', 63'; Thiare 73'	Stadium: City Stadium; Attendance: 5,046; Referee: Deny Kulasinac

== Statistics ==
=== Appearances and goals ===
As of November 10, 2026. Numbers after plus–sign (+) denote appearances as a substitute.

No.	Pos	Nat	Player	Total		USL1		U.S. Open Cup		USL1 Playoffs		Prinx Tigres Cup	
No.	Pos	Nat	Player	Apps	Goals	Apps	Goals	Apps	Goals	Apps	Goals	Apps	Goals
1	GK	(Canada) CAN	Yann Fillion	33	0	29+0	0	3+0	0	0+0	0	1+0	0
2	MF	(United States) USA	Dakota Barnathan	36	1	27+4	1	3+0	0	0+0	0	2+0	0
3	MF	(United States) USA	Hayden Anderson	34	0	24+4	0	2+0	0	0+0	0	2+2	0
4	DF	(Australia) AUS	Sam Layton	37	1	29+2	0	2+0	0	0+0	0	2+2	1
5	DF	(United States) USA	Ethan Kos	0	0	0+0	0	0+0	0	0+0	0	0+0	0
6	MF	(United States) USA	Ali Sasankhah	28	0	16+7	0	2+1	0	0+0	0	2+0	0
7	FW	(United States) USA	Landon Johnson	32	1	4+21	1	0+3	0	0+0	0	3+1	0
9	FW	(United States) USA	Josh Kirkland	30	7	17+7	6	2+1	1	0+0	0	2+1	0
10	MF	(Germany) GER	Nils Seufert	24	2	17+3	2	1+0	0	0+0	0	3+0	0
11	FW	(Germany) GER	Tarik Pannholzer	37	8	24+7	8	3+0	0	0+0	0	3+0	0
12	FW	(United States) USA	Owen O'Malley	33	1	20+6	1	3+0	0	0+0	0	3+1	0
13	GK	(United States) USA	Alex Wintsch	0	0	0+0	0	0+0	0	0+0	0	0+0	0
14	DF	(United States) USA	Zahir Vazquez	16	2	12+4	2	0+0	0	0+0	0	0+0	0
18	MF	(United States) USA	Austin Amer	34	2	12+15	2	1+2	0	0+0	0	2+2	0
19	FW	(Honduras) HON	Darwin Espinal	27	3	18+3	3	2+0	0	0+0	0	2+2	0
22	DF	(United States) USA	Sean Vinberg	26	2	18+5	2	1+0	0	0+0	0	2+0	0
23	FW	(United States) USA	Tyler Freeman	27	2	8+16	2	1+0	0	0+0	0	1+1	0
24	DF	(United States) USA	Josh Erlandson	1	0	0+1	0	0+0	0	0+0	0	0+0	0
26	DF	(Nigeria) NGR	Mujeeb Murana	26	1	16+4	1	2+0	0	0+0	0	4+0	0
32	MF	(United States) USA	Matt Bolduc	24	3	13+10	3	0+0	0	0+0	0	1+0	0
34	DF	(United States) USA	Beckett Howell	22	1	7+10	0	0+2	0	0+0	0	2+1	1
35	GK	(United States) USA	James Sneddon	6	0	3+0	0	0+0	0	0+0	0	3+0	0
41	MF	(United States) USA	Andrew Richman	8	0	2+4	0	0+0	0	0+0	0	1+1	0
43	DF	(United States) USA	Greyson Cadjoe	0	0	0+0	0	0+0	0	0+0	0	0+0	0
44	DF	(United States) USA	Axel Gallegos	12	0	9+1	0	0+0	0	1+1	0	0+0	0
45	DF	(United States) USA	Harold Hanson	13	0	13+0	0	0+0	0	0+0	0	0+0	0
70	FW	(Brazil) BRA	Lucca Dourado	23	6	9+9	4	1+2	2	0+0	0	0+2	0
99	DF	(United States) USA	Daniel Moore	25	0	6+14	0	0+1	0	0+0	0	2+2	0

=== Disciplinary record ===
No.	Pos.	Player	USL League One Regular Season			USL Cup			U.S. Open Cup			Total		
No.	Pos.	Player	Yellow card	(yellow card) (yellow-red card)	Red card	Yellow card	(yellow card) (yellow-red card)	Red card	Yellow card	(yellow card) (yellow-red card)	Red card	Yellow card	(yellow card) (yellow-red card)	Red card
1	GK	(Canada) Yann Fillion	6	0	0	0	0	0	1	0	0	7	0	0
2	MF	(United States) Dakota Barnathan	6	0	0	0	0	0	1	0	0	7	0	0
3	MF	(United States) Hayden Anderson	5	0	1	3	0	0	0	0	0	8	0	1
4	DF	(Australia) Sam Layton	10	0	0	1	0	0	0	0	0	11	0	0
5	DF	(United States) Ethan Kos	0	0	0	0	0	0	0	0	0	0	0	0
6	MF	(United States) Ali Sasankhah	6	0	0	1	0	0	2	0	0	9	0	0
7	MF	(United States) Landon Johnson	0	0	0	0	0	0	0	0	0	0	0	0
9	FW	(United States) Joshua Kirkland	4	0	0	0	0	0	0	0	0	4	0	0
10	MF	(Germany) Nils Seufert	3	0	0	1	0	0	0	0	0	4	0	0
11	FW	(Germany) Tarik Pannholzer	5	0	0	0	0	0	1	0	0	6	0	0
12	FW	(United States) Owen O'Malley	10	0	1	1	0	0	0	0	0	11	0	1
13	GK	(United States) Alex Wintsch	0	0	0	0	0	0	0	0	0	0	0	0
14	FW	(United States) Zahir Vazquez	2	0	0	0	0	0	0	0	0	2	0	0
18	MF	(United States) Austin Amer	5	0	0	0	0	0	0	0	0	5	0	0
19	FW	(Honduras) Darwin Espinal	4	0	0	0	0	0	0	0	0	4	0	0
22	DF	(United States) Sean Vinberg	4	0	0	1	0	0	0	0	0	5	0	0
23	FW	(United States) Tyler Freeman	3	0	0	0	0	0	0	0	0	3	0	0
24	DF	(United States) Josh Erlandson	0	0	0	0	0	0	0	0	0	0	0	0
25	MF	(United States) Matt Bolduc	1	0	0	0	0	0	0	0	0	1	0	0
26	DF	(Nigeria) Mujeeb Murana	4	0	0	2	0	0	1	0	0	7	0	0
35	DF	(United States) Beckett Howell	2	0	0	0	0	0	0	0	0	2	0	0
36	GK	(United States) James Sneddon	0	0	0	0	0	0	0	0	0	0	0	0
41	MF	(United States) Andrew Richman	0	0	1	1	0	0	0	0	0	1	0	1
43	DF	(United States) Greyson Cadjoe	0	0	0	0	0	0	0	0	0	0	0	0
44	MF	(United States) Axel Gallagos	1	0	0	0	0	0	0	0	0	1	0	0
45	DF	(United States) Harold Hanson	2	0	0	0	0	0	0	0	0	2	0	0
70	FW	(Brazil) Lucca Dourado	4	0	0	0	0	0	0	0	0	4	0	0
99	DF	(United States) Daniel Moore	1	0	0	1	0	0	0	0	0	2	0	0

=== Top Goalscorers ===
Rank	Position	Number	Name	USL1 Season	U.S. Open Cup	USL Cup	Total
1	FW	11	(Germany) Tarik Pannholzer	8	0	0	8
2	FW	9	(United States) Joshua Kirkland	6	1	0	7
3	FW	70	(Brazil) Lucca Dourado	4	2	0	6
4	FW	19	(Honduras) Darwin Espinal	3	0	0	3
5	MF	25	(United States) Matt Bolduc	3	0	0	3
6	MF	10	(Germany) Nils Seufert	2	0	0	2
7	MF	18	(United States) Austin Amer	2	0	0	2
8	DF	22	(United States) Sean Vinberg	2	0	0	2
9	FW	23	(United States) Tyler Freeman	2	0	0	2
10	FW	14	(United States) Zahir Vazquez	2	0	0	2
11	MF	7	(United States) Landon Johnson	1	0	0	1
12	DF	26	(Nigeria) Mujeeb Murana	1	0	0	1
13	DF	4	(Australia) Sam Layton	0	0	1	1
14	DF	34	(United States) Beckett Howell	0	0	1	1
15	MF	2	(United States) Dakota Barnathan	1	0	0	1
16	FW	12	(United States) Owen O'Malley	1	0	0	1
Total				37	3	2	42

=== Assist scorers ===
Rank	Position	Number	Name	USL1 Season	U.S. Open Cup	USL Cup	Total
2	FW	11	(Germany) Tarik Pannholzer	4	1	0	5
1	FW	19	(Honduras) Darwin Espinal	4	0	0	4
3	MF	2	(United States) Dakota Barnathan	3	1	0	4
4	FW	12	(United States) Owen O'Malley	3	0	0	3
6	MF	10	(Germany) Nils Seufert	2	0	1	3
5	FW	23	(United States) Tyler Freeman	1	1	0	2
7	MF	6	(United States) Ali Sasankhah	2	0	0	2
8	MF	25	(United States) Matt Bolduc	1	0	0	1
9	MF	3	(United States) Hayden Anderson	1	0	0	1
10	GK	1	(Canada) Yann Fillion	1	0	0	1
11	FW	70	(Brazil) Lucca Dourado	1	0	0	1
12	DF	4	(Australia) Sam Layton	1	0	0	1
13	FW	14	(United States) Zahir Vazquez	1	0	0	1
14	DF	45	(United States) Harold Hanson	1	0	0	1
Total				26	3	1	30

=== Clean sheets ===
Rank	Position	Number	Name	USL1 Season	U.S. Open Cup	USL Cup	Total
1	GK	1	(Canada) Yann Fillion	4	2	0	6
Total				4	2	0	6
