= 2019 Missouri State Bears soccer team =

American college soccer season

2019 Missouri State Bears men's soccer

Missouri Valley Conference regular season champions

NCAA Tournament, Second Round
- Conference: Missouri Valley Conference
- U. Soc. Coaches poll: No. 10
- TopDrawerSoccer.com: No. 12
- Record: 18–1–1 (10–0–0 The Valley)
- Head coach: Jon Leamy (28th season)
- Assistant coaches: Michael Seabolt (13th season); Will Lukowski (1st season); Phil Woods (1st season)
- Captain: Josh Dolling
- Home stadium: Betty & Bobby Allison South Stadium

2019 Missouri Valley Conference men's soccer standings
	Conf.					Overall
Team	W		L		T	W		L		T
No. 16 Missouri State +	10	–	0	–	0	18	–	1	–	1
Loyola Chicago ‡	5	–	2	–	3	11	–	4	–	4
Bradley	5	–	2	–	2	8	–	6	–	4
Drake	4	–	5	–	1	8	–	9	–	1
Valparaiso	3	–	7	–	0	4	–	13	–	1
Evansville	0	–	10	–	0	2	–	15	–	1
‡ – 2019 MVC Tournament champion + – Invited to the 2019 NCAA tournament; As of 17 December 2019; Rankings from United Soccer Coaches

The 2019 Missouri State Bears soccer team represented the Missouri State University during the 2019 NCAA Division I men's soccer season and the 2019 Missouri Valley Conference men's soccer season. The regular season began on August 30 and concluded on November 5. It was the program's 39th season fielding a men's varsity soccer team, and their 30th season in the Missouri Valley Conference. The 2019 season was Jon Leamy's 28th year as head coach for the program.

The 2019 season has proved to be one of the most successful seasons in the program's history. The program finished the regular season with a perfect 16–0–0 record, and were ranked as high as 9th in the nation in the United Soccer Coaches poll, their highest ranking since 1999. They lost in the Championship game of the MVC Tournament on penalties to Loyola Chicago. In the First Round of the NCAA Soccer Tournament they defeated Denver 1-0. In the second round they lost 2-1 at Central Florida.

== Player movement ==
=== Arrivals ===
Name	Nat.	Hometown	High School	Club	TDS Rating
Pau Ruiz; GK	ESP	Barcelona, ESP	La Salle Congres	Damm	
Giacomo Sala; DF	ITA	Monza, ITA	Collegio Bianconi		
Jon Koka; FW	ESP	Bilbao, ESP	Maristak Durango	Eibar	
Samuel Joyce; MF	SCO	Northumberland, UK	St Thomas More Catholic	Newcastle United	
Kian Yari; MF	ENG	Altrincham, UK	St Ambrose		
Connor Bates; MF	USA	Canton, MI	Shattuck-Saint Mary's	Shattuck-Saint Mary's	

== Roster ==
As of October 18, 2019

Note: Flags indicate national team as defined under FIFA eligibility rules; some limited exceptions apply. Players may hold more than one non-FIFA nationality.

No.	Pos.	Nation	Player
00	GK	ESP	Pau Ruiz
0	GK	USA	Gage Steiner
1	GK	USA	Michael Creek
2	DF	ENG	Connor Langan
3	DF	USA	Greg Stratton
4	DF	ITA	Giacomo Sala
5	DF	USA	Evan DeGreeff
6	DF	NZL	Ben Stroud
7	FW	ITA	Nicolo Mulatero
8	MF	ENG	Will Osgathorpe
9	FW	ENG	Matthew Bentley
10	FW	ENG	Josh Dolling
11	MF	MAS	Stuart Wilkin

No.	Pos.	Nation	Player
12	MF	NOR	Aadne Bruseth
14	FW	ESP	Jon Koka
15	MF	SCO	Samuel Joyce
16	DF	SWE	Hugo Jönsson
17	FW	USA	Ian Jones
18	MF	NZL	Zac Newdick
19	MF	ENG	Jack Denton
20	MF	ENG	Kian Yari
21	DF	CAN	Kyle Hiebert
22	MF	USA	Connor Bates
23	DF	NZL	Sean Green
26	FW	USA	Dawson Lee

== Season results ==
=== Fall exhibitions ===
August 21, 2019 1	Creighton	0–0	Missouri State	Omaha, NE
7:00 p.m. CST				Stadium: Morrison Stadium

August 24, 2019 2	Saint Louis	0–0	Missouri State	St. Louis, MO
6:00 p.m. CST				Stadium: Hermann Stadium

=== Regular season ===
August 29, 2019 1	Missouri State	Postponed	Kansas City	Springfield, MO
7:00 p.m. CST				Stadium: Betty & Bobby Allison South Stadium

September 2, 2019 2	Santa Clara	0–1	Missouri State	Santa Clara, CA
9:30 p.m. CST	Christensen (yellow card) 44'; Osei (yellow card) 84'	Report	Dolling 39'	Stadium: Stevens Stadium; Attendance: 337; Referee: Ian Anderson

September 7, 2019 3	Kansas City	0–3	Missouri State	Kansas City, MO
7:00 p.m. CST	Caruso (yellow card) 44'; Ray-Campoy (yellow card) 77'; Temm (yellow card) 87'	Report	Dolling 25'; Osgathorpe 64'; Jonsson 82'	Stadium: Durwood Soccer Stadium; Attendance: 370; Referee: Matthew Seem

September 10, 2019 4	Missouri State	1–0	Central Arkansas	Springfield, MO
7:00 p.m. CST	Stroud (yellow card) 55'; Hiebert (yellow card) 84'; Dolling 90'	Report		Stadium: Betty & Bobby Allison South Stadium; Attendance: 568; Referee: Roy Robinson

September 14, 2019 5	Missouri State	2–1 (a.e.t.)	Tulsa	Springfield, MO
7:00 p.m. CST	Hiebert (yellow card) 63'; Jones 82'; Dolling (yellow card) 85' 95'	Report	Partain 8'; Garcia (yellow card) 63'	Stadium: Betty & Bobby Allison South Stadium; Attendance: 0 Referee: Andy Ellsworth

September 18, 2019 6	Missouri State	3–1	Valparaiso	Springfield, MO
12:00 p.m. CST	Wilkin 6'; Jones 9'; Bentley 64'	Report	Cushing 33'	Stadium: Betty & Bobby Allison South Stadium; Attendance: 124; Referee: Kale Allatayfeh

September 22, 2019 7	Loyola Chicago	1–2 (a.e.t.)	Missouri State	Chicago, IL
CST	Sukow 41'	Report	Bentley 49'; Wilkin 92'	Stadium: Loyola Soccer Park; Attendance: 319; Referee: Calin Radosav

September 26, 2019 8	Western Illinois	0–4	#19 Missouri State	Macomb, IL
CST	Owen 61'	Report	Multatero 9'; Stroud 44', 70'; Dolling 85'	Stadium: MacKenzie Alumni Field; Attendance: 140

October 1, 2019 9	#17 Missouri State	1–0 (a.e.t.)	Omaha	Springfield, MO
6:00 p.m. CST	Hiebert (yellow card) 51'; Denton (yellow card) 80'; Stroud 107'	Report	Rinderknecht (yellow card) 2'; Mateu (yellow card) 52'; Nelson (yellow card) 95'; Gomez (yellow card) 107'	Stadium: Betty & Bobby Allison South Stadium; Attendance: 712; Referee: Shane Butler

October 5, 2019 10	Evansville	0–4	#17 Missouri State	Evansville, IN
5:00 p.m. CST	Brunetti (yellow card) 48'	Report	Bentley 18', 20'; Hiebert 38'; Wilkin 39'; Denton (yellow card) 50'	Stadium: Arad McCutchan Stadium; Attendance: 263; Referee: Michael Robertson

October 9, 2019 11	#14 Missouri State	3–0	Bradley	Springfield, MO
7:00 p.m. CST	Jones 2'; Bentley 14', 32'	Report	Kovačević (yellow card) 17'; Lang (yellow card) 45'; Wintermeyer (yellow card) 77'; Schindler (yellow card) 81'	Stadium: Betty & Bobby Allison South Stadium; Attendance: 328; Referee: Dimitar Chavdarov

October 13, 2019 12	#14 Missouri State	3–1	Drake	Springfield, MO
1:00 p.m. CST	Wilkin 30'; Dolling (yellow card) 54'; Bentley 75' (pen.); Bruseth 78'	Report	Wilson 44' (red card) 75'; Poppen (yellow card) 78'; Misselhorn (yellow card) 90'	Stadium: Betty & Bobby Allison South Stadium; Attendance: 242; Referee: Julio Tonoco

October 19, 2019 13	Bradley	1–2	#14 Missouri State	Peoria, IL
7:00 p.m. CST	Johnson 26'; Lang (yellow card) 37'; McKee (yellow card) 60'; Wintermeyer (yellow card) 76'	Report	Bentley 43'; Stratton 81'	Stadium: Shea Stadium; Attendance: 838; Referee: Edmundo Ramirez

October 26, 2019 14	#9 Missouri State	2–1	Evansville	Springfield, MO
5:00 p.m. CST	Mulatero 5'; Bentley 52'; Stroud (yellow card) 90'	Report	Hall 66'; Pavlič (yellow card) 67'; Graham (yellow card) 85'	Stadium: Betty & Bobby Allison South Stadium; Attendance: 386; Referee: Don Tebo

October 30, 2019 15	Valparaiso	2–3 (a.e.t.)	Missouri State	Valparaiso, IN
12:00 p.m. CST	Eaton (yellow card) 30'; Waugaman 44' (yellow card) 91'; Madondo 50'	Report	Dolling (yellow card) 45'; Bentley (yellow card) 71' (goal) 72' 99'; Wilkin 86'	Stadium: Brown Field; Attendance: 54; Referee: Nicholas Balcer

November 3, 2019 16	#9 Missouri State	2–1	#23 Loyola Chicago	Springfield, MO
1:00 p.m. CST	Bentley 1'; Lee 41'	Report	Woehrle (yellow card) 70'; Sukow 90'	Stadium: Betty & Bobby Allison South Stadium; Attendance: 1,064; Referee: Sorin Stoica

November 9, 2019 17	Drake	1–3	#10 Missouri State	Des Moines, IA
1:00 p.m. CST	Wilson 41'	Report	Stroud 8' (yellow card) 70'; Bentley 85'; Dolling 87'	Stadium: Cownie Sports Complex; Attendance: 653; Referee: Art Arustamyan

=== Missouri Valley Tournament ===
November 15, 2019 Semifinals	No. 9 (1) Missouri State	1–0	(4) Drake	Chicago, IL
1:05 p.m. CST	Dolling 67'	Report	Bartlett (yellow card) 57'; Poppen (yellow card) 67'	Stadium: Loyola Soccer Park; Attendance: 163; Referee: Heber Estrada

November 17, 2019 Final	(2) Loyola Chicago	1–1 (a.e.t.) (5–4 p)	No. 9 (1) Missouri State	Chicago, IL
1:00 p.m. CST	Biggs 89'	Report	Bentley 57'	Stadium: Loyola Soccer Park; Attendance: 303; Referee: Gregory Dopka
	Penalties
	(penalty scored) Megally; (penalty scored) Sukow; (penalty scored) Dias; (penalty scored) Woehrle; (penalty missed) Schweinert; (penalty missed) Magno; (penalty scored) Stoneman		Bentley (penalty scored); Mulatero (penalty scored); Dolling (penalty missed); Jones (penalty scored); Stroud (penalty scored); Denton (penalty missed); Stratton (penalty missed)

=== NCAA Tournament ===
November 21, 2019 First round	No. 12 Missouri State	1–0	Denver	Springfield, MO
7:00 p.m. CST				Stadium: Betty & Bobby Allison South Stadium

November 24, 2019 Second round	No. 8 UCF	2–1 (a.e.t.)	No. 12 Missouri State	Orlando, FL
5:00 p.m. CST				Stadium: UCF Soccer and Track Stadium; Attendance: 857

== Rankings ==
Ranking movements Legend: ██ Increase in ranking ██ Decrease in ranking — = Not ranked RV = Received votes
	Week														
Poll	Pre	1	2	3	4	5	6	7	8	9	10	11	12	13	Final
United Soccer	—	—	—	RV	RV	19	17	14	14	9	10	9	12	12	16
Top Drawer Soccer	—	—	—	—	RV	24	19	20	22	13	13	13	12	14	17
College Soccer News	—	—	—	RV	RV	27	25	21	16	15	14	12	11	11	11
Soccer America	—	—	—	—	—	23	22	18	14	13	10	9	9	13	13

== Season Statistics ==
=== Goals ===
The leading goal scorer for Missouri State was Matthew Bentley who scored 15 goals during the season. He was the only player to score during the regular season and both MVC and NCAA Tournament. Josh Dolling finished the year with 7 goals in second. Stuart Wilkin rounded out the top three with 5 goals on the season.

Rank	No.	Pos.	Player	Regular Season	MVC Tournament	NCAA Tournament	Total
1	9	FW	(England) Matthew Bentley	13	1	1	15
2	10	FW	(England) Josh Dolling	6	1	0	7
3	11	MF	(Wales) Stuart Wilkin	5	0	0	5
4	6	DF	(New Zealand) Ben Stroud	4	0	0	4
5	17	FW	(United States) Ian Jones	3	0	0	3
6	7	FW	(Italy) Nicolo Mulatero	2	0	0	2
6	12	MF	(Norway) Aadne Bruseth	1	0	1	2
8	8	MF	(England) Will Osgathorpe	1	0	0	1
8	3	DF	(United States) Greg Stratton	1	0	0	1
8	21	DF	(Canada) Kyle Hiebert	1	0	0	1
8	16	DF	(Sweden) Hugo Jonsson	1	0	0	1
Total				39	2	2	43

Last updated: August 19, 2020.
Source: Missouri State Athletics

=== Assists ===
Rank	No.	Pos.	Player	Regular Season	MVC Tournament	NCAA Tournament	Total
1	19	MF	(England) Jack Denton	8	1	0	9
2	10	FW	(England) Josh Dolling	5	0	0	5
3	9	FW	(England) Matthew Bentley	4	0	0	4
3	11	MF	(Wales) Stuart Wilkin	4	0	0	4
5	3	DF	(United States) Greg Stratton	3	0	0	3
6	12	MF	(Norway) Aadne Bruseth	2	0	0	2
6	17	FW	(United States) Ian Jones	2	0	0	2
6	8	MF	(England) Will Osgathorpe	2	0	0	2
6	21	DF	(Canada) Kyle Hiebert	2	0	0	2
6	26	FW	(United States) Lee Dawson	2	0	0	2
6	2	DF	(England) Connor Langan	1	1	0	2
11	16	DF	(Sweden) Hugo Jonsson	1	0	0	1
11	7	FW	(Italy) Nicolo Mulatero	0	0	1	1
11	20	MF	(England) Kian Yari	1	0	0	1
Total				37	2	1	40

Last updated: August 19, 2020.
Source: Missouri State Athletics
