= 2019 Missouri Valley Conference men's soccer tournament =

- Classification: Division I
- Site: Loyola Soccer Park; Chicago, Illinois
- Champions: Loyola Chicago (1st title)
- Winning coach: Neil Jones (1st title)
- MVP: Aidan Megally (Loyola Chicago)
- Broadcast: ESPN+

2019 Missouri Valley Conference men's soccer standings
	Conf.					Overall
Team	W		L		T	W		L		T
No. 16 Missouri State +	10	–	0	–	0	18	–	1	–	1
Loyola Chicago ‡	5	–	2	–	3	11	–	4	–	4
Bradley	5	–	2	–	2	8	–	6	–	4
Drake	4	–	5	–	1	8	–	9	–	1
Valparaiso	3	–	7	–	0	4	–	13	–	1
Evansville	0	–	10	–	0	2	–	15	–	1
‡ – 2019 MVC Tournament champion + – Invited to the 2019 NCAA tournament; As of 17 December 2019; Rankings from United Soccer Coaches

The 2019 Missouri Valley Conference men's soccer tournament was the 30th edition of the competition. The tournament was played from November 13 until November 17, 2019.

Loyola Chicago won their first MVC championship, beating regular season champions, Missouri State, in the final.

== Background ==
The 2019 Missouri Valley Conference Men's Soccer Tournament is the culmination of the regular season. The regular season conference matches determine the seeding in the tournament, which determines the conference's automatic berth into the NCAA Tournament. All teams in the Missouri Valley Conference, or MVC, play each other once during the season. Teams play certain teams at home during even number years, and then will play those teams on the road during odd number years. Teams are awarded three points for a win, a point for a draw and no points for a loss.

In the event that teams are tied on points, the first tiebreaker is head-to-head record. If that tiebreaker is tied, goal differential is applied, followed by goals scored, then away goals, then RPI.

Missouri State won the regular season with a perfect 10–0–0 record, the first time a MVC program had won all 10 conference games in MVC history. Both programs earned a berth into the NCAA Tournament. Loyola Chicago lost in overtime to Kentucky in the opening round. Missouri State defeated Denver in the first round before losing to UCF in the second round.

== Seeding ==
Seed	School	Conference	Tiebreaker
1	Missouri State	10–0–0	
2	Loyola Chicago	5–2–3	
3	Bradley	5–3–2	
4	Drake	4–5–1	
5	Valparaiso	3–7–0	
6	Evansville	0–10–0	

== Bracket ==
Quarterfinals; Wednesday, Nov. 13
3	Bradley	2
6	Evansville	0
4	Drake (a.e.t.)	2
5	Valparaiso	1

Semifinals; Friday, Nov. 15
2	Loyola Chicago	2
3	Bradley	1
1	Missouri State	1
4	Drake	0

Final; Sunday, Nov. 17
2	Loyola Chicago (pen.)	1 (5)
1	Missouri State	1 (4)

== Results ==
=== Quarterfinals ===
November 13, 2019
1:00 p.m. CST

No. 4 Drake	2–1 (a.e.t.)	No. 5 Valparaiso
Bartlett 87'; Enzugusi 103'	Report	Marcey 17'

Loyola Soccer Park, Chicago, Illinois
Attendance: 98
Referee: Art Arustamyan

November 13, 2019
4:00 p.m. CST

No. 3 Bradley	2–0	No. 6 Evansville
Wintermeyer 26', 89'	Report

Loyola Soccer Park, Chicago, Illinois
Attendance: 127
Referee: Alex Beehler

=== Semifinals ===
November 15, 2019
1:00 p.m. CST

No. 1 Missouri State	1–0	No. 4 Drake
Dolling 67'	Report

Loyola Soccer Park, Chicago, Illinois
Attendance: 163
Referee: Heber Estrada

November 15, 2019
4:00 p.m. CST

No. 2 Loyola Chicago	2–1	No. 3 Bradley
Megally 27'; Sukow 60'	Report	Kullmann 15' (o.g.)

Loyola Soccer Park, Chicago, Illinois
Attendance: 282
Referee: Cesar Ibarra

=== Final ===
November 17, 2019

No. 2 Loyola Chicago	1–1 (a.e.t.)	No. 1 Missouri State
Biggs 89'	Report	Bentley 57'
Penalties
Megally (penalty scored); Sukow (penalty scored); Dias (penalty scored); Woehrle (penalty scored); Schweinert (penalty missed); Magno (penalty missed); Stoneman (penalty scored)	5–4	(penalty scored) Bentley; (penalty scored) Mulatero; (penalty missed) Dolling; (penalty scored) Jones; (penalty scored) Stroud; (penalty missed) Denton; (penalty missed) Stratton

Loyola Soccer Park, Chicago, Illinois
Attendance: 303
Referee: Gregory Dopka

== All-Tournament team ==
Player	Team
**2020 MVC Men's Soccer All-Tournament team**
Mason Marcey	Valparaiso
Ethan Garvey	Evansville
Leroy Enzugusi	Drake
Lucas Bartlett	Drake
Gerit Wintermeyer	Bradley
Nathan Wisbey	Bradley
Josh Dolling	Missouri State
Kyle Hiebert	Missouri State
Stuart Wilkin	Missouri State
Billy Hency	Loyola Chicago
Andy Mitchell	Loyola Chicago
**Aidan Megally**	Loyola Chicago
Justin Sukow	Loyola Chicago

MVP in bold
