= 2019 Missouri Valley Conference men's soccer season =

- League: NCAA Division I
- Sport: Soccer
- Duration: August 30, 2019 – November 9, 2019
- Teams: 6

2020 MLS SuperDraft

Regular Season
- Season MVP: Offensive: Defensive: Goalkeeper:

Tournament

Missouri Valley Conference men's soccer seasons
- ← 2018 2020 →

2019 Missouri Valley Conference men's soccer standings
	Conf.					Overall
Team	W		L		T	W		L		T
No. 16 Missouri State +	10	–	0	–	0	18	–	1	–	1
Loyola Chicago ‡	5	–	2	–	3	11	–	4	–	4
Bradley	5	–	2	–	2	8	–	6	–	4
Drake	4	–	5	–	1	8	–	9	–	1
Valparaiso	3	–	7	–	0	4	–	13	–	1
Evansville	0	–	10	–	0	2	–	15	–	1
‡ – 2019 MVC Tournament champion + – Invited to the 2019 NCAA tournament; As of 17 December 2019; Rankings from United Soccer Coaches

The 2019 Missouri Valley Conference men's soccer season was the 29th season of men's varsity soccer in the conference. The season began in late August 2019 and concluded in mid-November 2019.

== Changes from 2018 ==
Central Arkansas left the Missouri Valley Conference as an affiliate member to become an affiliate member of the Sun Belt Conference.

== Teams ==
Team	Location	Stadium	Capacity	Head coach	Uniform supplier
Bradley Braves	Peoria, Illinois	Shea Stadium	3,800	(United States) Jim DeRose	(Germany) adidas
Drake Bulldogs	Des Moines, Iowa	Cownie Sports Complex	2,000	(Scotland) Gareth Smith	(Germany) adidas
Evansville Purple Aces	Evansville, Indiana	Arad McCutchan Stadium	2,500	(United States) Marshall Ray	(Germany) adidas
Loyola Ramblers	Chicago, Illinois	Loyola Soccer Park	500	(New Zealand) Neil Jones	(United States) Nike
Missouri State Bears	Springfield, Missouri	Robert W. Plaster Stadium	16,600	(United States) John Leamy	(Germany) adidas
Valparaiso Crusaders	Valparaiso, Indiana	Brown Field	5,000	(United States) Mike Avery	(United States) Nike

== Preseason ==
=== Preseason poll ===
The preseason poll was released on August 15, 2019. Missouri State was picked to win the MVC championship.

	Team ranking	Points	First
1.	Missouri State	32	4
2.	Loyola Chicago	31	1
3.	Drake	22	1
4.	Bradley	18	0
5.	Evansville	12	0
6.	Valpo	11	0

=== Preseason national polls ===
The preseason national polls will be released in July and August 2019.

	United; Soccer	CSN	SoccerAmerica	Top DrawerSoccer
Bradley	—	—	—	—
Drake	—	—	—	—
Evansville	—	—	—	—
Loyola Chicago	—	RV	—	—
Missouri State	—	RV	—	—
Valparaiso	—	—	—	—

=== Preseason all-MVC team ===
To be announced in August 2019.

== Regular season ==
=== Early season tournaments ===
Early season tournaments will be announced in late Spring and Summer 2019.

Team	Tournament	Finish

=== Conference results ===
Each team plays every other conference team twice; once home and once away.

Home \ Away	BRA	DRA	EVN	LOY	MSU	VPO
Bradley	—	1–0	Nov. 9	0–0	1–2	1–0
Drake	2–0	—	1–0	1–2	Nov. 9	1–3
Evansville	0–1	0–2	—	1–2	0–4	0–1
Loyola Chicago	0–0	3–3	1–0	—	1–2	2–0
Missouri State	3–0	3–1	2–1	2–1	—	3–1
Valparaiso	1–2	0–2	2–1	Nov. 9	2–3	—

Source: MVC-Sports.com
Legend: Blue = home team win; Yellow = draw; Red = away team win.
For upcoming matches, an "a" indicates there is an article about the rivalry between the two participants.

=== Rankings ===
==== National rankings ====
	Improvement in ranking
	Drop in ranking
RV	Received votes but were not ranked in Top 25
NV	No votes received

		Pre	Wk 1	Wk 2	Wk 3	Wk 4	Wk 5	Wk 6	Wk 7	Wk 8	Wk 9	Wk 10	Wk 11	Wk 12	Wk 13	Wk 14	Wk 15	Wk 16	Final
Bradley	USC	NV	NV	NV	NV	NV	NV	NV	NV						None released				
Bradley	TDS	NV	NV	NV	NV	NV	NV	NV	NV	NV									
Drake	USC	NV	NV	NV	NV	NV	NV	NV	NV						None released				
Drake	TDS	NV	NV	NV	NV	NV	NV	NV	NV	NV									
Evansville	USC	NV	NV	NV	NV	NV	NV	NV	NV						None released				
Evansville	TDS	NV	NV	NV	NV	NV	NV	NV	NV	NV									
Loyola Chicago	USC	NV	RV	NV	NV	NV	NV	RV	RV						None released				
Loyola Chicago	TDS	NV	NV	NV	NV	NV	NV	NV	NV	NV									
Missouri State	USC	NV	NV	NV	RV	19	17	14	14						None released				
Missouri State	TDS	NV	NV	NV	NV	RV	19	19	21	22									
Valpo	USC	NV	NV	NV	NV	NV	NV	NV	NV						None released				
Valpo	TDS	NV	NV	NV	NV	NV	NV	NV	NV	NV									

==== Regional rankings — United Soccer West Region ====
	Improvement in ranking
	Drop in ranking
RV	Received votes but were not ranked in Top 10
NV	No votes received

The United Soccer West Region for 2019 compares teams across the Missouri Valley, WCC, and Summit League.

	Wk 1	Wk 2	Wk 3	Wk 4	Wk 5	Wk 6	Wk 7	Wk 8	Wk 9	Wk 10	Wk 11	Wk 12
Bradley	10	9	NV	NV	NV	10	10					
Drake	NV	NV	NV	NV	9	9	9					
Evansville	9	NV	9	NV	NV	NV	NV					
Loyola Chicago	5	7	6	6	6	6	6					
Missouri State	NV	5	2	2	2	2	1					
Valparaiso	NV	NV	NV	NV	NV	NV	NV					

==== NCAA RPI Rankings ====
Improvement in ranking
Drop in ranking

	Wk 6	Wk 7	Wk 8	Wk 9	Wk 10	Wk 11	Wk 12
Bradley	138						
Drake	133						
Evansville	175						
Loyola Chicago	41						
Missouri State	20						
Valparaiso	140						

=== Players of the Week ===
Date	Offensive Player of the Week	Class	Position	School	Defensive Player of the Week	Class	Position	School	Ref.
September 3	Cole Rainwater	Fr.	FW	Valpo	Jacob McKee	Sr.	DF	Bradley	
September 10	Gerit Wintermeyer	Jr.	FW	Bradley	Jack Denton	So.	MF	Missouri State	
September 17	Josh Dolling	Jr.	FW	Missouri State	Kyle Hiebert	Jr.	DF	Missouri State	
September 24	Stuart Wilkin	Sr.	MF	Missouri State	Luke Anderson	So.	GK	Drake	
October 1	Aidan Megally	Sr.	MF	Loyola Chicago	Ben Stroud	Sr.	DF	Missouri State	
October 8	Roman Schindler	Sr.	FW	Bradley	Michael Creek	Jr.	GK	Missouri State	
October 15	Aidan Megally	Sr.	MF	Loyola Chicago	Greg Stratton	Jr.	DF	Missouri State	
October 22									
October 29									
November 5									
November 12									

== Postseason ==
=== NCAA Tournament ===
Two teams from the MVC were selected to the NCAA Tournament: the regular season champions, Missouri State, and the tournament champions, Loyola Chicago. Neither team was given a second round bye. Missouri State was selected to host a first round matchup. In the NCAA Tournament, Missouri State beat Denver in the first round before losing to the ninth-seeded UCF in the second round. Loyola Chicago lost their first round matchup to Kentucky in the opening round.

Seed	School	1st Round	2nd Round	3rd Round	Quarterfinals	Semifinals	Championship
—N/a	Missouri State	W 1–0 vs. Denver – (Springfield, MO)	L 1–2 (OT) vs. UCF – (Orlando, FL)				
—N/a	Loyola Chicago	L 1–2 (OT) vs. Kentucky – (Lexington, KY)					
	W–L–T (%):	1–1–0 (.500)	0–1–0 (.000)	0–0–0 (–)	0–0–0 (–)	0–0–0 (–)	0–0–0 (–) Total: 1–2–0 (.333)

=== Postseason awards and honors ===
2019 Missouri Valley Conference Men's Soccer Individual Awards
Award	Recipient(s)
Player of the Year	Aidan Megally – Loyola Chicago
Offensive Player of the Year	Matthew Bentley – Missouri State
Defensive Player of the Year	Kyle Hiebert – Missouri State
Goalkeeper of the Year	Michael Creek – Missouri State
Coach of the Year	Jon Leamy – Missouri State
Freshman of the Year	Andy Mitchell – Loyola Chicago

2019 Missouri Valley Conference Men's Soccer All-Conference Teams
First Team	Second Team	Honorable Mention
Michael Creek, R-Jr., GK, Missouri State; Kyle Hiebert, R-Jr., DF, Missouri State; Walid Kherat, R-Sr., DF, Bradley; Ben Stroud, Sr., DF, Missouri State; Aidan Megally, Sr., MF, Loyola Chicago; Justin Sukow, Jr., MF, Loyola Chicago; Stuart Wilkin, Sr., MF, Missouri State; Matthew Bentley, Sr., FW, Missouri State; Josh Dolling, Jr., FW, Missouri State; Leroy Enzugusi, Jr., FW, Drake; Gerit Wintermeyer, Jr., FW, Bradley	Nathan Wisbey, Ian Jones, Sr., FW, Missouri State	

== 2020 MLS Draft ==
The 2020 MLS SuperDraft was held on January 9 and 13 2020. Two players from the conference were drafted.

Rnd.	Pick	Player	Pos.	Team	School
4	88	Matthew Bentley	FW	Minnesota United	Missouri State (Sr.)
4	92	Aidan Megally	MF	FC Dallas	Loyola Chicago (Sr.)

== Homegrown players ==
The Homegrown Player Rule is a Major League Soccer program that allows MLS teams to sign local players from their own development academies directly to MLS first team rosters. Before the creation of the rule in 2008, every player entering Major League Soccer had to be assigned through one of the existing MLS player allocation processes, such as the MLS SuperDraft.

To place a player on its homegrown player list, making him eligible to sign as a homegrown player, players must have resided in that club's home territory and participated in the club's youth development system for at least one year. Players can play college soccer and still be eligible to sign a homegrown contract.

Original MLS team	Player	Pos.	School	Ref.
