= Yann Fillion =

Canadian soccer player (born 1996)

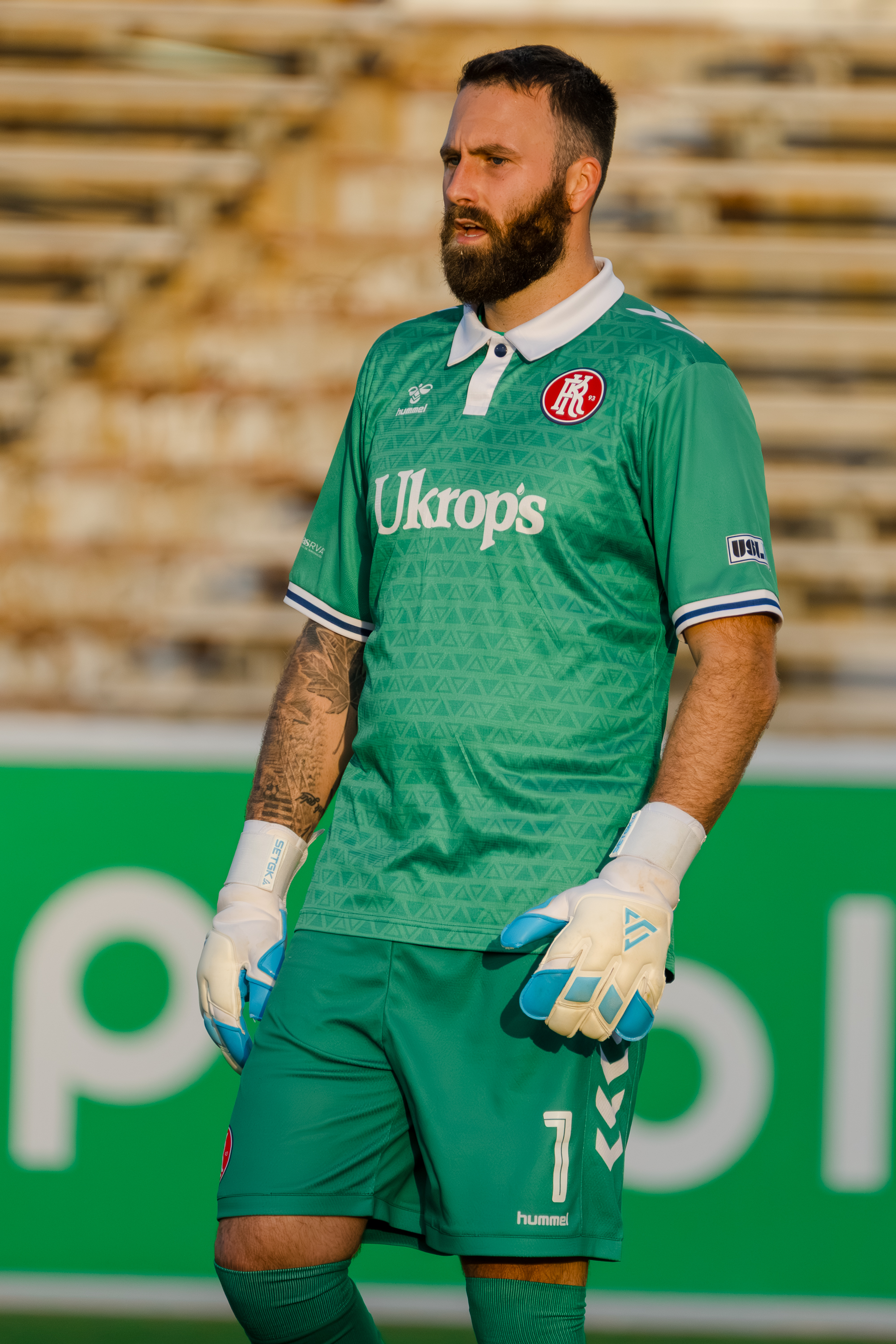
- Fillion with the Richmond Kickers in 2026

Personal information
- Full name: Yann-Alexandre Fillion
- Date of birth: February 14, 1996 (age 30)
- Place of birth: Ottawa, Ontario, Canada
- Height: 1.93 m (6 ft 4 in)
- Position: Goalkeeper

Team information
- Current team: Richmond Kickers
- Number: 1

Youth career
- Ottawa Gloucester Hornets
- FC Capital United SC
- AS Hull
- 2013–2015: Montreal Impact

Senior career*
Years	Team	Apps	(Gls)
2015	FC Montreal	6	(0)
2016–2019	Zürich	0	(0)
2017	→ Umeå FC (loan)	17	(0)
2018	→ Nest-Sotra (loan)	1	(0)
2018	→ FC Aarau (loan)	0	(0)
2019	→ Toronto FC II (loan)	5	(0)
2020	Ekenäs IF	15	(0)
2021	AC Oulu	21	(0)
2021	→ OLS (loan)	1	(0)
2022	IFK Mariehamn	6	(0)
2023–2024	HFX Wanderers	52	(0)
2025	Floriana	1	(0)
2026–	Richmond Kickers	29	(0)
- * Club domestic league appearances and goals as of November 2, 2026

Yann-Alexandre Fillion (born 14 February 1996) is a Canadian professional soccer player who plays for the Richmond Kickers in USL League One.

== Early life ==
Fillion was born in Ottawa, Ontario. After originally playing youth soccer in Ottawa with Gloucester Hornets and Capital United, he later moved to AS Hull in Quebec. In January 2013, Fillion joined the Montreal Impact Academy, after completing a couple of trials.

== Club career ==
In March 2015, Fillion joined the Impact's second team FC Montreal in the USL for their inaugural season. He made his professional debut for the club on March 28 in a 2–0 defeat to Toronto FC II.

In early 2016, he went to Switzerland to trial with Swiss Super League club FC Zürich, being invited back before signing a five-year contract in May 2016. An injury early in his time in Switzerland, limited his integration into the first team. In February 2017, Fillion was loaned to Swedish Division 1 club Umeå FC for the 2017 season, departing after the season when his loan was not extended. In April 2018, he was loaned to Norwegian second tier side Nest-Sotra for the 2018 season. In July 2018, he was loaned to FC Aarau of the Swiss Challenge League, helping them to a second place finish. In March 2019, he joined Toronto FC II in USL League One on loan.

In December 2019, it was announced that Fillion signed with Ekenäs IF of the Ykkönen for the 2020 season on a free transfer. He finished the 2020 season with the second highest Instat rating amongst goalkeepers in the league with a 220 rating.

In December 2020, he joined Veikkausliiga club AC Oulu on a one-year contract for the 2021 season with an option for a second year. In June 2021, he joined Oulu's affiliate club Oulun Luistinseura for a match in the third tier Kakkonen against SJK Akatemia. He was an important figure for the team making several key saves throughout the season, however, he was dropped from the squad ahead of their promotion playoff matches at the end of the season. He departed the club after one season.

In November 2021, he signed with Veikkausliiga club IFK Mariehamn for one season with an option for another year.

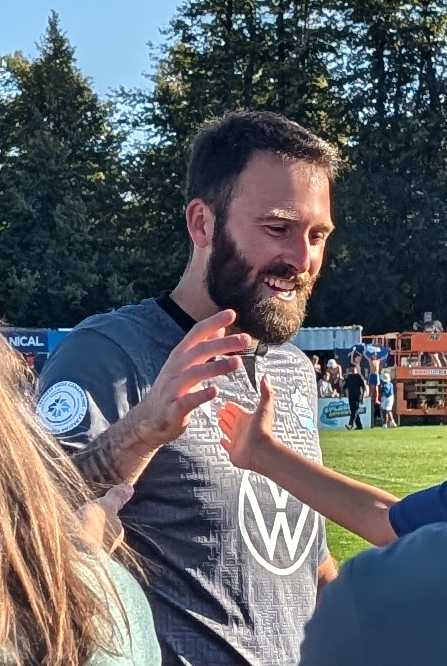
Fillion with HFX Wanderers in 2024

In January 2023, he signed with the HFX Wanderers in the Canadian Premier League. He turned down other offers in Europe, in order to join the Wanderers. He was immediately named the club's starter, playing every minute of the 2023 season thus far. He departed the club following the 2024 season.

In January 2025, Fillion signed with Maltese Premier League club Floriana. In the summer of 2025, he departed the club after rescinding his contract.

In December 2025, he joined USL League One club Richmond Kickers, on a multu-year contract.

On 7 March 2026, Fillion made his debut for the Kickers in a 1–1 draw against AV Alta in the opening match of the USL League One season. He would record his first clean sheet in a 2–0 win against NoVA FC.

== Career statistics ==
As of match played March 18, 2026

Appearances and goals by club, season and competition
Club	Season	League			Playoffs		National cup		Other		Total	
Club	Season	Division	Apps	Goals	Apps	Goals	Apps	Goals	Apps	Goals	Apps	Goals
FC Montreal	2015	USL	6	0	—		—		—		6	0
FC Zürich	2016–17	Swiss Challenge League	0	0	—		0	0	—		0	0
Umeå FC (loan)	2017	Swedish Division 1	17	0	—		0	0	—		17	0
Nest-Sotra (loan)	2018	1. divisjon	1	0	—		0	0	0	0	1	0
FC Aarau (loan)	2018–19	Swiss Challenge League	0	0	—		0	0	0	0	0	0
Toronto FC II (loan)	2019	USL League One	5	0	—		—		—		5	0
Ekenäs IF	2020	Ykkönen	15	0	—		5	0	—		20	0
AC Oulu	2021	Veikkausliiga	21	0	—		2	0	0	0	23	0
OLS	2021	Kakkonen	1	0	—		0	0	—		1	0
IFK Mariehamn	2022	Veikkausliiga	9	0	—		2	0	2	0	13	0
HFX Wanderers	2023	Canadian Premier League	28	0	1	0	1	0	—		30	0
HFX Wanderers	2024	Canadian Premier League	24	0	—		1	0	—		25	0
HFX Wanderers	Total		52	0	1	0	2	0	0	0	55	0
Floriana	2024–25	Maltese Premier League	1	0	—		3	0	0	0	4	0
Richmond Kickers	2026	USL League One	3	0	0	0	2	0	0	0	5	0
Career total			131	0	1	0	14	0	2	0	148	0
