= Michael Hodgetts =

English Catholic historian (1936–2022)

Michael William Hodgetts KSG (29 March 1936 – 12 December 2022) was an English Catholic historian who became a leading expert on priest holes and on Harvington Hall.

== Early life ==
Hodgetts was born in Birmingham on 29 March 1936, and was raised a Catholic. He attended King Edward's School, Birmingham and then studied classics at Worcester College, Oxford, as well as studying for three years as a seminarian at the Venerable English College, Rome, before becoming a teacher at St Thomas More Catholic School, Willenhall.

== Career ==
In the 1970s and 1980s, he sat on the International Commission on English in the Liturgy, alongside his work as a teacher, and his translation of the hymn Pange lingua is now used in the English-language Catholic liturgy for Good Friday.

In 1984, he was appointed to the management committee of Harvington Hall, a former manor house and centre of Recusancy that had been given to the Archdiocese of Birmingham in 1923. He edited the volumes series of the Catholic Record Society and the society's journal, Recusant History (now British Catholic History). In 1989 he retired from school-teaching and joined the staff of Maryvale Institute, a Catholic college of further and higher education.

== Personal life ==
He married Barbara in 1969. They had four children.

Hodgetts died on 12 December 2022, at the age of 86.

== Works ==
Books/Chapters
Date	Title
1989	Secret Hiding Places
1990	Revising the Order of Christian Funerals in Peter C. Finn & James M. Schellman edd., Shaping English Liturgy: Studies in Honor of Archbishop Denis Hurley
1994	Recusant Liturgical Music in Christopher Francis & Martin Lynch edd., A Voice for All Time
1996	History of Blackmore Park 1596-1846-1996
1999	(with V Alan McCleland) edd., From Without The Flaminian Gate: 150 years of Roman Catholicism in England and Wales 1850-2000
1999	The Iron Form: Catholics and Philosophy between the Councils in McCleland & Hodgetts edd., From Without The Flaminian Gate: 150 years of Roman Catholicism in England and Wales 1850-2000
1999	The Godly Garret, 1560-1660’, in Marie B. Rowlands ed., English Catholics of Parish and Town, 1558-1778
2000	History of St Joseph's Upton upon Severn 1850-2000
2002	History of Erdington Abbey
2002	History of St Joseph's Nechells
2004	Nicholas Owen in The Oxford Dictionary of National Biography
2006	Introduction to John Gerard: The Autobiography of an Elizabethan, tr Caraman, 2nd edition
2008	Art and Thought in J. J. Scarisbrick ed., History of the Diocese of Birmingham, 1850-2000
2009	Coughton and the Powder Plot in Peter Marshall & Geoffrey Scott, edd. The Catholic Gentry in English Society: The Throckmortons of Coughton from Reformation to Emancipation
2011	(with Aileen M. Hodgson), Little Malvern Letters—I: 1482-1737
2024	Secret Hiding Places 2nd Edn, ed Paul Hodgetts
2026	(with Aileen M. Hodgson) Little Malvern Letters—II: 1737-1870

Journal Articles
Date	Journal	Title
1959	The Venerabile	Priests' Hiding Holes
1959	Transactions of the Worcestershire Archaeological Society New Series	Adam of Harvington
1960	The Venerabile	Blessed John Wall - I
1960	The Venerabile	Blessed John Wall - II
1962	Staffordshire Catholic History	Staffordshire Priest Holes
1962	The Month	Nicholas Owen In East Anglia
1962	Transactions of the Worcestershire Archaeological Society New Series	The Priest-Holes at Harvington Hall
1963	Worcestershire Recusant	John Wall’s Execution: An Eyewitness
1963	Worcestershire Recusant	The Recusant History of a County
1964	Transactions of the Worcestershire Archaeological Society New Series	The Priest-Holes at Hindlip Old Hall
1965	Recusant History	John Wall at Harvington?
1965	Transactions of the Worcestershire Archaeological Society Third Series	Elizabethan Recusancy in Worcestershire I
1965	Worcestershire Recusant	A Certificate of Warwickshire Recusants 1592 I
1965	Worcestershire Recusant	A Certificate of Warwickshire Recusants 1592 II
1966	Worcestershire Recusant	The Priest Holes at Harvington: Some Further Notes
1967	Worcestershire Recusant	John Wall’s Juramentum
1967	Worcestershire Recusant	Recusant Houses of Warwickshire and Worcestershire I
1967	Worcestershire Recusant	Recusant Houses of Warwickshire and Worcestershire II
1967	Worcestershire Recusant	Two Harvington Letters
1968	Staffordshire Catholic History	The Royal Hiding Places at Boscobel and Moseley
1968	Worcestershire Recusant	Recusant Houses of Warwickshire and Worcestershire III
1970	Transactions of the Worcestershire Archaeological Society Third Series	Elizabethan Recusancy in Worcestershire II
1970	Worcestershire Recusant	Priests At Harvington 1660-1690
1972	Recusant History	Elizabethan Priest Holes I : Dating and Chronology
1973	Recusant History	Elizabethan Priest Holes II : Ufton, Mapledurham and Compton Wynyates
1973	Recusant History	Elizabethan Priest Holes III : East Anglia, Baddesley Clinton and Hindlip
1973	Worcestershire Recusant	Long Live King James: A Satirical Poem
1974	Worcestershire Recusant	Jesuits at Baddesley Clinton October 1591
1975	Recusant History	Elizabethan Priest Holes IV : Harvington Hall
1975	Worcestershire Recusant	Register of Thomas Butler of Much Wenlock I
1976	Music and Liturgy	Translating Liturgical Texts
1976	Recusant History	Brough Hall Caterrick and Thorpe Hall Norwich: A note
1976	Recusant History	Elizabethan Priest Holes V : The North
1976	The Clergy Review	Recusant Liturgical Music
1976	Worcestershire Recusant	Register of Thomas Butler of Much Wenlock II
1977	Canon Law Society of Great Britain and Ireland Newsletter	The English Church without Bishops: 1559-1623
1977	Recusant History	Elizabethan Priest Holes VI : The Escape of Charles II
1977	The Clergy Review	The English Tradition and Liturgical Reform
1977	Worcestershire Recusant	Register of Thomas Butler of Much Wenlock III
1978	Worcestershire Recusant	Charles II at Bromsgrove?
1980	Recusant History	Tanner on Nicholas Owen: A Note
1980	Worcestershire Recusant	Seventeenth Century Priests at Harvington
1981	Worcestershire Recusant	An Inventory of Harvington Hall 1826
1981	Worcestershire Recusant	Harvington Hall 1929-1979: A Study In Local Historiography
1982	Recusant History	A Topographical Index of Hiding Places
1982	Worcestershire Recusant	Paradisus Redivivus?
1982	Worcestershire Recusant	Park Hall, Castle Bromwich
1983	Worship	Sense and Sound in Liturgical Translation
1984	ECA Journal	Priest-Holes and Recusancy
1985	Eighteenth-Century Life (Williamsburg, VA)	Secret Hiding Places: A Narrative of Tradition and Truth from the Restoration to the Regency
1985	Liturgy	Rejoicing in Psalms?
1985	Worcestershire Recusant	An Inventory of Harvington Hall 1797
1986	Worcestershire Recusant	Recusants in the Midlands
1986	Worcestershire Recusant	Shropshire Priests in 1605
1989	Recusant History	Loca Secretiora in 1581
1991	Midlands Catholic History	De Angelis on the Barrel-Organ, 1819
1991	Midlands Catholic History	Recusant Contributors to the Worcester Cathedral Organ 1613
1992	Midlands Catholic History	Mrs Packington and a Shakespearian Emblem
1993	Music and Liturgy	De Angelis on the Barrel-Organ, 1819
1994	Midlands Catholic History	‘Wharton’s Ghost’ 1785
1994	Midlands Catholic History	Thomas Belson’s Complaint
1994	Recusant History	The Yates of Harvington 1631-1696
1995	Liturgy	Revising the Missal: Introit and Communion Antiphons
1995	Midlands Catholic History	Origins of Recusancy: The Pakingtons 1530-80
1998	Recusant History	A Topographical Index of Hiding Places II
1999	Recusant History	The Owens of Oxford
2000	Midlands Catholic History	Campion in Staffordshire and Derbyshire 1581
2002	Recusant History	The Throckmortons of Harvington 1696-1923
2003	Midlands Catholic History	The Holtes of Aston Hall Birmingham
2004	Midlands Catholic History	Rushock Court 1595
2005	Midlands Catholic History	The Chimney Hide at Mapledurham
2005	Recusant History	A Topographical Index of Hiding Places III
2006	Midlands Catholic History	The Gunpowder Plot in Warwickshire and Worcestershire
2006	Recusant History	Mille Maeandris Nicholas Owen 1606-2006
2006	Recusant History	The 1958 Conference in Context
2007	Music and Liturgy	Recusant Liturgy 1559-1791
2008	Midlands Catholic History	Itinerant Priests in Oxfordshire 1592
2009	Midlands Catholic History	Worcester Conformity certificates 1614-27
2009	The Basilican (St Chad's Cathedral Magazine)	Papistry and Brewing: The Malt House at Harvington
2010	Midlands Catholic History	Recusant Liturgy 1559-1791
2010	Recusant History	Campion in the Thames Valley 1580
2011	Midlands Catholic History	Greys Court, Oxfordshire
2012	Midlands Catholic History	Barsford Bridge 1584
2012	Midlands Catholic History	Thomas Strange and the Powder Plot
2012	The Basilican (St Chad's Cathedral Magazine)	Pugin & Newman
2013	Midlands Catholic History	Francis Martyn (1782-1838) and St Mary’s The Mount
2014	Midlands Catholic History	Midland Recusant Altars
2014	The Basilican (St Chad's Cathedral Magazine)	‘Firmness to this Glass’: The Stonework at Harvington
2015	Midlands Catholic History	Lyford Grange 1581-1681
2015	Midlands Catholic History	The Jesuits in Sutton Coldfield: A Note
2016	Midlands Catholic History	Hides and Hinges: Boscobel and Harvington
2016	Music and Liturgy	Recusant Hymnody 1559-1800
2016	The Basilican (St Chad's Cathedral Magazine)	Franciscans in Birmingham, 1656-1716
2017	Midlands Catholic History	The Simeons of Britwell House, Oxfordshire, and Aston-By-Stone, Staffordshire
2018	Midlands Catholic History	Charles II in Warwickshire 10 September 1651
2019	Midlands Catholic History	Henry Garnet’s Pilgrimage to Holywell, 1605
2019	The Basilican (St Chad's Cathedral Magazine)	Birmingham Catholics, 1560-1660
2020	Midlands Catholic History	The Layout of Elizabethan Recusant Houses
2020	The Basilican (St Chad's Cathedral Magazine)	‘Lead, Kindly Light’: Newman’s Hymns
2021	Midlands Catholic History	Rycote, Thame Park and Waterperry 1530-1800
2021	The Basilican (St Chad's Cathedral Magazine)	Georgian Chapels
2022	Midlands Catholic History	Lady Yate's Fund for Harvington
2022	Midlands Catholic History	The Elizabethan Catholic Underground
2022	The Basilican (St Chad's Cathedral Magazine)	Benedictines in Worcestershire and Warwickshire, 1600-1800
2022	The Basilican (St Chad's Cathedral Magazine)	The Jesuit Residence of St George, 1580-1780
2023	Midlands Catholic History	Dodd and his History
2024	Midlands Catholic History	Nicholas Owen: Jesuit Lay Brother?

Archdiocese of Birmingham Historical Commission
Date	Title
1987	St Chad's Cathedral
1990	Midlands Catholic Buildings
1991	Harvington Hall guidebook (repub.1998 and 2011)
2002	Life at Harvington
2017	Midland Martyrs

Unpublished / Works in progress
Title
Eighteenth Century Chapels in the Archdiocese of Birmingham
Elizabethan Catholic Gentry: Portraits in Settings
Elizabethan Catholics in Leicestershire
Elizabethan Catholics in Lincolnshire
Elizabethan Recusancy at Eynsham
Grafton Manor, Badge Court and Purshall Hall
Hindlip House 1606
Linen on Hedges
Recusant Houses of the Midlands and East Anglia
Robert Persons in the Welsh Marches 1580
The Comptons of Compton Wynyates
The Fortescues of Cookhill
Tixhall Hall and Gatehouse
Words for Music Perhaps: The Mechanics of Texts for Hymns

== Awards ==
- Knight of St Gregory the Great (1990)
