= Zahir Vazquez =

American soccer player (born 1999)

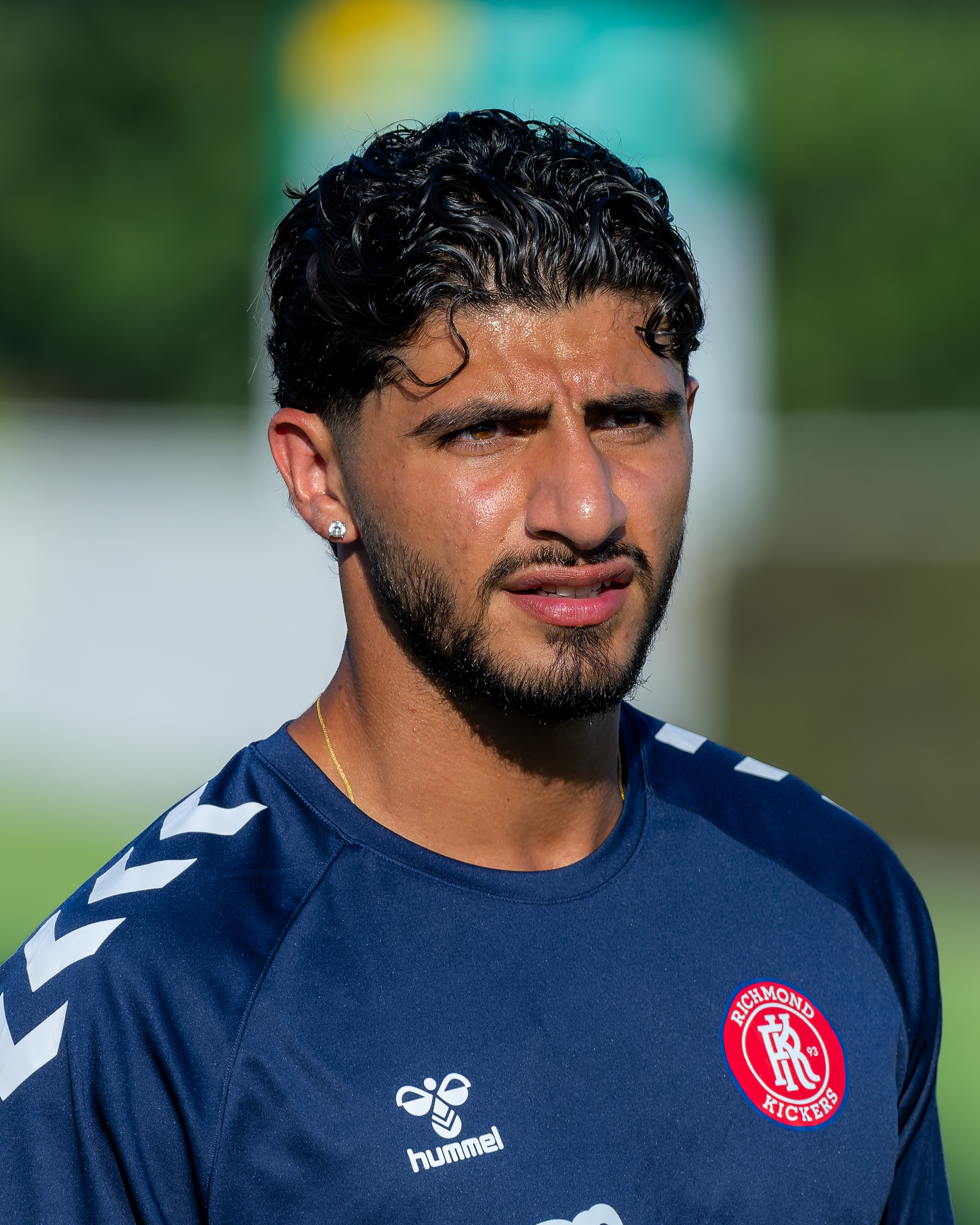
- Vazquez with the Richmond Kickers in 2026

Personal information
- Date of birth: 5 September 1999 (age 27)
- Place of birth: Ogden, Utah, United States
- Height: 1.78 m (5 ft 10 in)
- Position: Forward

Team information
- Current team: Richmond Kickers
- Number: 14

Youth career
- La Roca
- –2018: Real Salt Lake

College career
Years	Team	Apps	(Gls)
2018–2021	Utah Valley Wolverines	59	(6)

Senior career*
Years	Team	Apps	(Gls)
2019–2021	Ogden City SC	10	(3)
2022	Park City Red Wolves	6	(4)
2022–2024	Central Valley Fuego	54	(7)
2025	Chattanooga Red Wolves	29	(4)
2026	Valley 559 FC		
2026–	Richmond Kickers	16	(2)
- * Club domestic league appearances and goals as of November 2, 2026

Zahir Vazquez (born September 5, 1999) is an American soccer player who currently plays as a forward for USL League One club Richmond Kickers.

== Early life ==
Vazquez was born on September 5, 1999, in Ogden, Utah

== Career ==
Vazquez attended Roy High School, also playing club soccer with La Roca before joining the Real Salt Lake academy.

In 2018, Vazquez attended Utah Valley University to play college soccer. In four seasons with the Wolverines, Vasquez made 59 appearances, scoring six goals and tallying seven assists. He was named Academic All-WAC Team in all four seasons.

While at college, Vazquez appeared for USL League Two side Ogden City SC. He made ten appearances for the club, scoring three goals over the 2019 and 2021 season.

In 2022, Vazquez continued his career after college playing for USL League Two club Park City Red Wolves, scoring four goals in six games.

=== Central Valley Fuego ===
On 16 September 2022, Vazquez signed his first professional contract, joining USL League One side Central Valley Fuego for the remainder of their season. He scored his first professional goal on 5 October 2022, against FC Tucson, which was subsequently nominated for goal of the week.

=== Chattanooga Red Wolves ===
On 28 March 2025, Vazquez signed for the Chattanooga Red Wolves, another club in USL League One after Central Valley Fuego was self relegated. In his only season with Chattanooga, he played 29 games and scored four goals.

==== Valley 559 FC ====
In January 2026, Vazquez signed for Valley 559 FC in the United Premier Soccer League.

=== Richmond Kickers ===
On 21 July 2026, Vazquez joined the Richmond Kickers in USL League One on a contract until the end of the 2026 season.
