= Daniel Moore (soccer) =

American soccer player (born 2002)

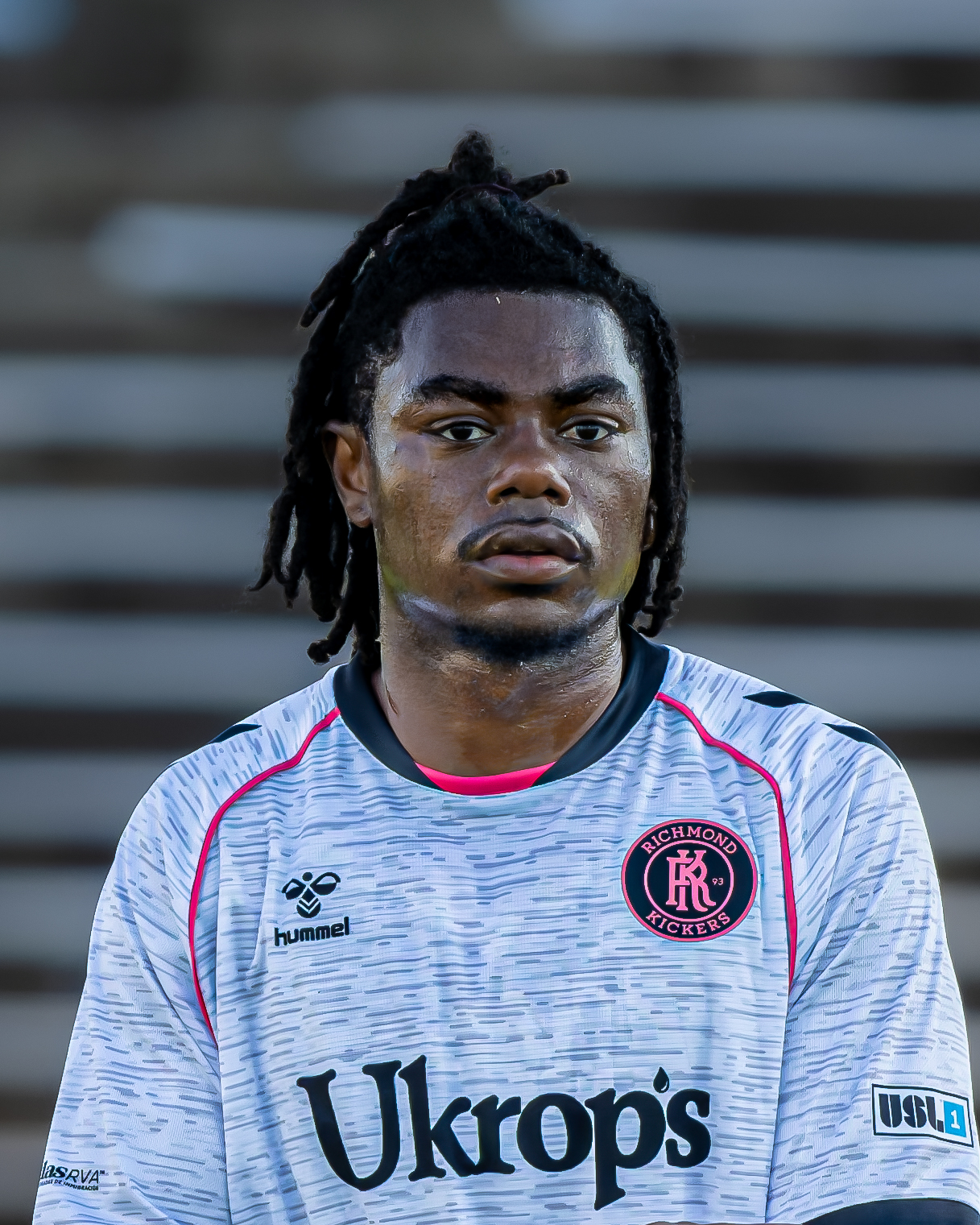
- Moore with the Richmond Kickers in 2026

Personal information
- Date of birth: July 12, 2002 (age 24)
- Place of birth: Charlotte, North Carolina, United States
- Height: 1.87 m (6 ft 2 in)
- Position: Left-back

Team information
- Current team: Richmond Kickers
- Number: 99

Youth career
- 2015–2018: Carolina Rapids Developmental Academy
- 2018–2020: Charlotte Independence

College career
Years	Team	Apps	(Gls)
2020–2022	SLU Billikens	26	(36)
2023–2024	Charlotte 49ers	36	(2)

Senior career*
Years	Team	Apps	(Gls)
2025	Crown Legacy FC	15	(1)
2026–	Richmond Kickers	20	(0)
- * Club domestic league appearances and goals as of November 2, 2026

Daniel Moore (born July 12, 2002) is an American professional soccer player that plays as a left-back for the Richmond Kickers in USL League One.

== Early life and youth career ==
Daniel Moore was born on July 12, 2002, in Charlotte, North Carolina. He initially started his career at the Colorado Rapids Developmental Academy in 2015. He then played up to 42 games in the 2016/17 season. He eventually returned to his hometown and play for the Charlotte Independence academy, until 2020.

== College career ==
Moore started college playing for the SLU Billikens. He would make a total of 26 appearances and scoring one goal in 2021 season.

In 2023, he moved to play for the Charlotte 49ers. He would play a total of 36 games and two goals across two seasons.

== Professional career ==
On March 3, 2025, Moore joined Crown Legacy FC in the MLS Next Pro on a one-year contract with a club option for 2026.

On March 7, he made his debut getting subbed in a 2–2 draw against New York City FC II, although they would later lose 6–7 on penalties. His first goal for the club came in a 4–2 win against Inter Miami II.

On March 18, 2026, Moore signed for the Richmond Kickers in USL League One. He made his debut for the Kickers in a 1–1 draw against AV Alta.
