= Mujeeb Murana =

Nigerian footballer (born 2003)

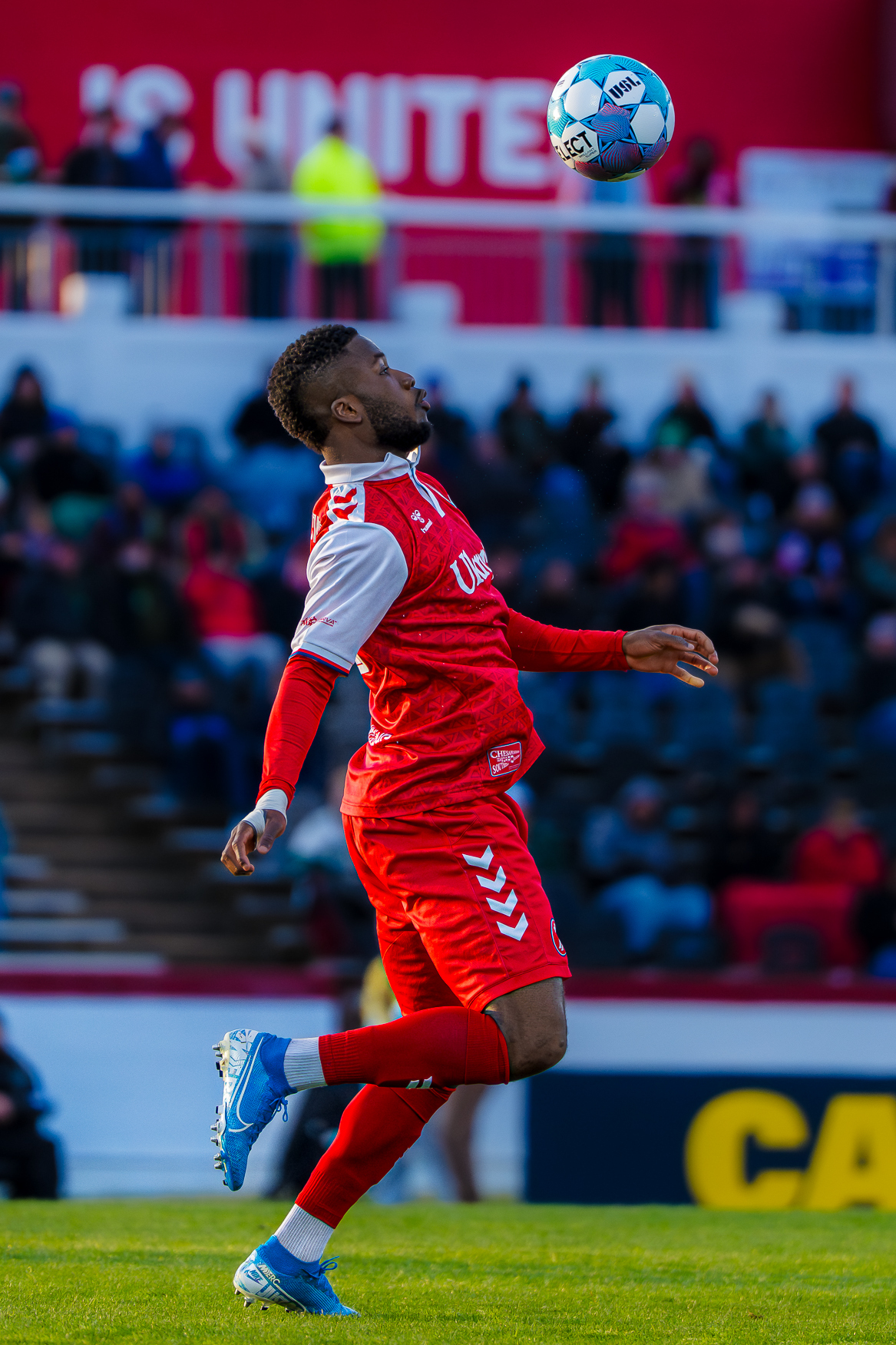
- Murana with the Richmond Kickers in 2026

Personal information
- Date of birth: 23 September 2000 (age 26)
- Place of birth: Ibadan, Nigeria
- Height: 1.87 m (6 ft 2 in)
- Position: Right-back

Team information
- Current team: Richmond Kickers
- Number: 26

Youth career
- 2012–2019: Houston Dynamo

College career
Years	Team	Apps	(Gls)
2019–2022	SLU Billikens	52	(6)

Senior career*
Years	Team	Apps	(Gls)
2021	Flint City Bucks	7	(1)
2022–2023	Houston Dynamo 2	45	(2)
2023	Houston Dynamo	0	(0)
2024	Birmingham Legion	10	(1)
2024	Miami FC	17	(0)
2026–	Richmond Kickers	20	(1)
- * Club domestic league appearances and goals as of November 2, 2026

Mujeeb Murana (born 23 September 2000) is a Nigerian professional footballer who plays as a right-back for USL League One club Richmond Kickers.

== Club career ==
Born in Nigeria, Murana moved to the United States in 2007 with his father, and enrolled in local soccer programs. He joined the youth academy of Houston Dynamo in 2012, and captained their youth team at U19 level. He attended Saint Louis University, where he was a mainstay of their soccer team the SLU Billikens. He had a stint with the Flint City Bucks in 2021, with 1 goal and 7 appearances. On 16 February 2023, he signed a homegrown contract with the Houston Dynamo for the 2023 season, with options to extended until 2025.

He made his senior and professional debut with Houston Dynamo in a 1–0 U.S. Open Cup win over Sporting Kansas City on 10 May 2023.

Following his release from Houston at the end of their 2023 season, Murana joined USL Championship side Birmingham Legion. He transferred to Miami FC on June 1, 2024.

On 4 December 2025, Murana signed for USL League One club Richmond Kickers for their 2026 season.

He made his debut for the Kickers in the opening match of the USL League One season, in a 1–1 draw against AV Alta.

== Personal life ==
Murana's older brother Quayyum Murana also played football with the SLU Billikens. He speaks the Yoruba language.
