= Dakota Barnathan =

American soccer player (born 1994)

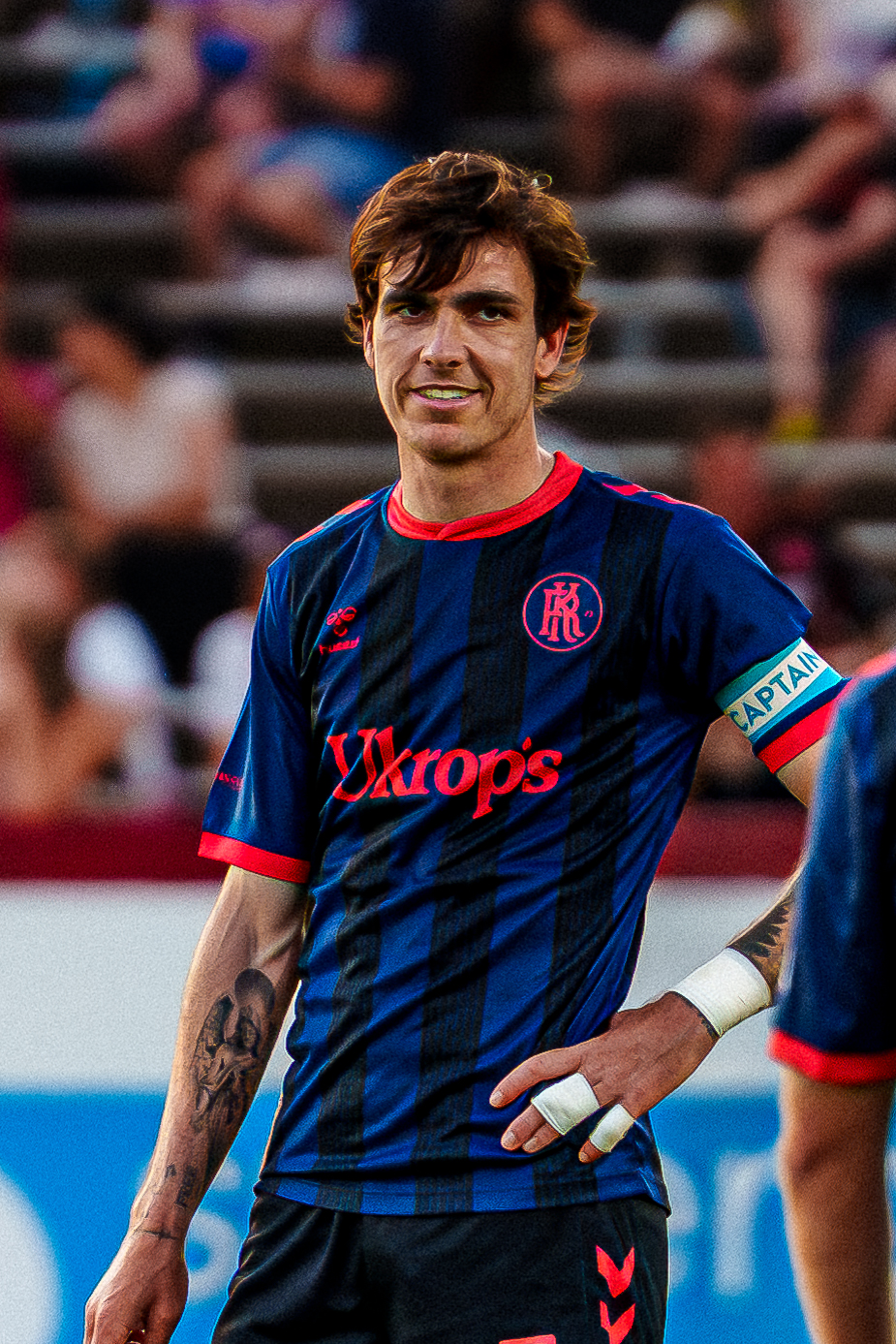
- Barnathan with the Richmond Kickers in 2026

Personal information
- Full name: Dakota Barnathan
- Date of birth: November 9, 1994 (age 32)
- Place of birth: Massapequa, New York, United States
- Height: 1.88 m (6 ft 2 in)
- Positions: Defender; defensive midfielder

Team information
- Current team: Richmond Kickers
- Number: 2

Youth career
- 2011–2012: New York Cosmos

College career
Years	Team	Apps	(Gls)
2012–2016	VCU Rams	85	(9)

Senior career*
Years	Team	Apps	(Gls)
2012–2013	Long Island Rough Riders	14	(3)
2015–2016	Portland Timbers U23s	13	(2)
2017–2018	Swope Park Rangers	21	(0)
2019	Ottawa Fury	24	(0)
2020	Pittsburgh Riverhounds SC	8	(0)
2021	FC Tucson	24	(0)
2022–	Richmond Kickers	131	(5)
- * Club domestic league appearances and goals as of October 31, 2026

Dakota Barnathan (born November 9, 1994) is an American professional soccer player who currently plays for the Richmond Kickers in USL League One whom he captains.

== Career ==
=== Early career ===
Barnathan played college soccer at Virginia Commonwealth University (VCU) from 2013 and 2016, spending 2012 redshirted. While at VCU, Barnathan played for USL PDL sides Long Island Rough Riders and Portland Timbers U23s.

=== Professional ===
On January 17, 2017, Barnathan was selected by FC Dallas in the third round of the 2017 Major League Soccer SuperDraft as the 59th overall pick.

Unsigned by Dallas, Barnathan joined United Soccer League side Swope Park Rangers on February 24, 2017. Barnathan was released by Swope Park on December 3, 2018. He subsequently signed with Ottawa Fury FC of the USL Championship on January 31, 2019.

In March 2021, after one season with Pittsburgh Riverhounds SC, Barnathan joined USL League One side FC Tucson.

Barnathan returned to Virginia in February 2022, signing with USL League One club Richmond Kickers.

On 5 November 2025, Barnathan signed a contract extension through the 2027 season.

On 27 March 2026, Barnathan made his 100th league appearance for the Kickers in a 1–0 loss against 2025 reigning champions One Knoxville.

== Career statistics ==
As of December 19, 2025

Club	Season	League			Playoffs		League Cup		Continental		Total	
Club	Season	Division	Apps	Goals	Apps	Goals	Apps	Goals	Apps	Goals	Apps	Goals
Swope Park Rangers	2017	USL	11	0	4	0	0	0	––		15	0
Swope Park Rangers	2018	USL	10	0	–		0	0	––		10	0
Ottawa Fury FC	2019	USL Championship	3	0	–		0	0	––		3	0
Pittsburgh Riverhounds SC	2020	USL Championship	8	0	–		—		—		8	0
FC Tucson	2021	USL League One	24	0	2	0	—		—		26	0
Richmond Kickers	2022	USL League One	28	2	1	0	2	0	—		31	2
Richmond Kickers	2023	USL League One	22	1	–		1	1	—		23	2
Richmond Kickers	2024	USL League One	21	0	0	0	10	2	—		31	2
Richmond Kickers	2025	USL League One	25	1	–		4	0	––		29	1
Richmond Kickers	2026	USL League One	3	0	0	0	2	0	––		5	0
Richmond Kickers	Total		99	4	3	0	19	3	––		119	7
Career total			152	0	4	0	19	3	––		176	7

== Honors ==
=== Club ===
Swope Park Rangers

- United Soccer League Cup: Runner-up 2017
