= Tarik Pannholzer =

German footballer (born 2000)

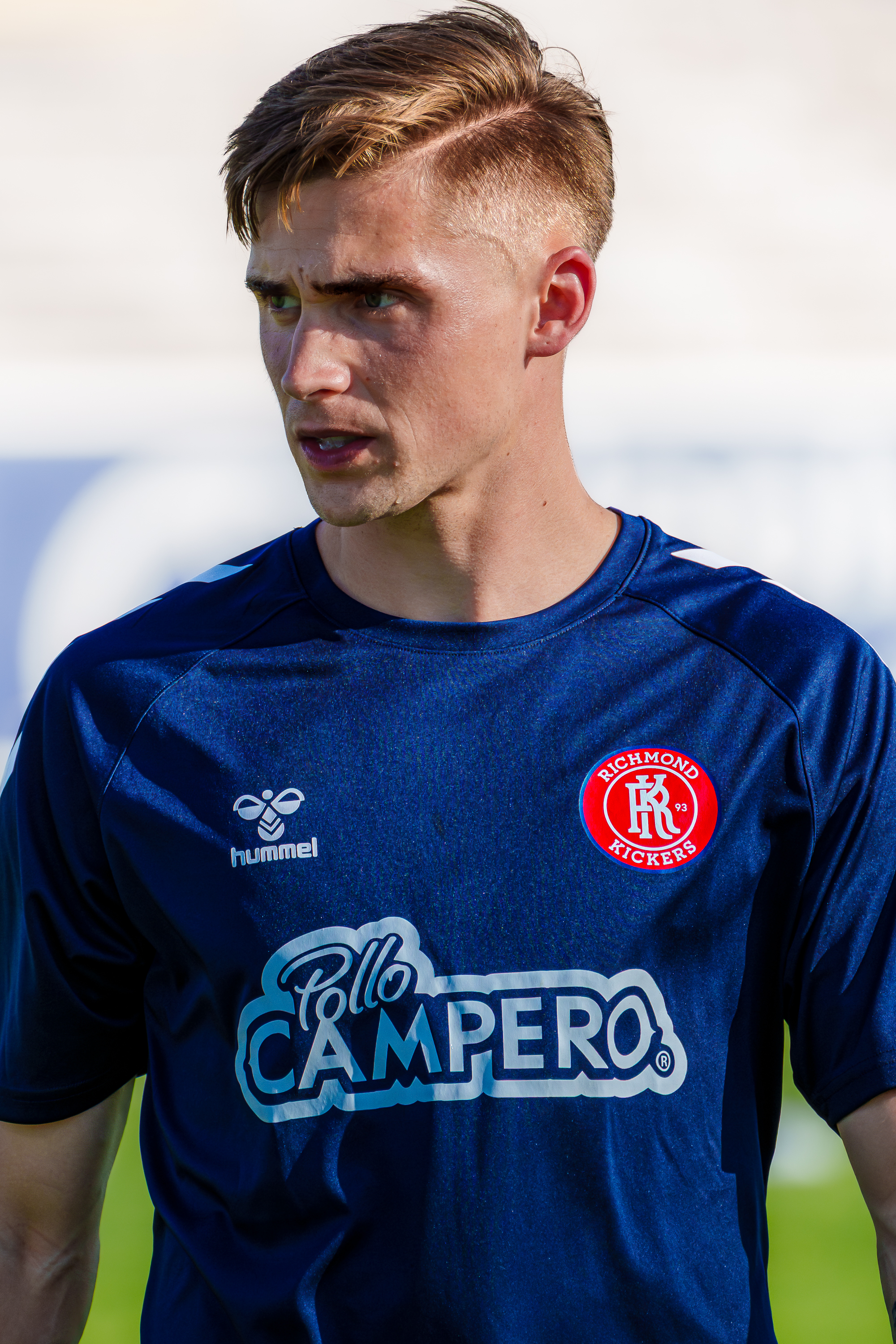
- Pannholzer with the Richmond Kickers in 2026

Personal information
- Date of birth: 5 May 2000 (age 26)
- Place of birth: Flensburg, Germany
- Height: 1.73 m (5 ft 8 in)
- Positions: Left winger; center-forward

Team information
- Current team: Richmond Kickers
- Number: 11

Youth career
- TuS Nettlingen
- SV Adelby
- 2012–2013: TSB Flensburg
- 2014–2015: Flensburg 08
- 2015–2019: St. Pauli
- 2019: TSB Flensburg

College career
Years	Team	Apps	(Gls)
2020–2021	East Tennessee State Buccaneers	42	(19)
2021–2024	Marshall Thundering Herd	56	(22)

Senior career*
Years	Team	Apps	(Gls)
2022–2023	NONA FC		
2025	Flensburg 08	13	(0)
2025	Flensburg 08 II	1	(0)
2026–	Richmond Kickers	31	(8)
- * Club domestic league appearances and goals as of 16:37, 2 November 2026 (UTC)

Tarik Pannholzer (born 5 May 2000) is a German professional footballer that plays as a left-winger and center-forward for the Richmond Kickers in USL League One.

== Early life ==
Tarik Pannholzer was born in Flensburg, Germany. He is the son of Mathias and Dagny.

== Youth career ==
Tarik Pannholzer played in the Youth Bundesliga and Oberliga for FC St. Pauli scored 11 goals and registered five assists in 16 appearances and was also a U15 Germany national team member. He also played previously for TuS Nettlingen, SV Adelby, TSB Flensburg, and Flensburg 08.

== College career ==
In 2020, he moved to the United States and joined the ETSU Buccaneers where he would play 42 games and score 19 goals.

In 2021, after one season with the Bucs, he went to Marshall Thundering Herd and played 56 games and 22 goals.

== Professional career ==
=== Nona FC ===
On 10 March 2022, while still in college, he signed for Nona FC in USL League Two.

=== Flensburg 08 ===
On 24 January 2025, Pannholzer rejoined his former club Flensburg 08 in the Regionalliga Nord. He made his debut on 23 February, in a 2–1 loss against TSV Havelse. He would make a total of 13 appearances for Flensburg 08 in the 2024–25 campaign.

Starting the 2025–26 season, he was moved to the reserve team Flensburg 08 II which plays in the Landesliga Schleswig. He made his only appearance in a 3–3 draw against TSV Hattstedt.

=== Richmond Kickers ===
On 2 December 2025, Pannholzer signed for the Richmond Kickers in USL League One. He would make his debut for the club in the opening match of the season in a 1–1 draw against AV Alta. On 11 April 2026, Pannholzer scored his first goal for the Kickers in a 3–1 loss against Spokane Velocity. He would also score the winning goal in a 2–1 win against Union Omaha. On 17 October 2026, Pannholzer scored his first senior career hat-trick for the Kickers in a 5–1 win against expansion club, Corpus Christi. Pannholzer would finish his debut season as top goalscorer for the club with eight goals.
