= St Thomas More Catholic School, Willenhall =

Location
- Darlaston Lane; Willenhall, West Midlands, WV14 7BL; England; 52.5734°N 2.0535°W

Information
- Type: Voluntary aided Comprehensive
- Motto: God's Servant First
- Religious affiliation: Roman Catholic
- Founder: Archdiocese of Birmingham
- Local authority: Metropolitan Borough of Walsall
- Department for Education URN: 104259 Tables
- Ofsted: Reports
- Headteacher: Siobhan M. Bowen
- School Chaplain: Fr. C. Fullard
- Gender: Co-educational
- Age: 11 to 18
- Enrolment: c. 1,500 students
- Website: http://www.st-thomasmore.walsall.sch.uk

St Thomas More Catholic School, Willenhall is a voluntary aided comprehensive Catholic secondary school educating children aged 11–18 in the town of Willenhall, West Midlands, England.

Originally opened in 1973, the school gained an annexe in September of the same year when it took over the buildings of the former Francis Leveson Roman Catholic High School, on Bilston Lane, Willenhall.

The school continued to use this site for 30 years, until April 2003 after which the old Francis Leveson buildings, originally opened in 1961 were demolished and replaced by a residential development of approximately 150 homes. The school moved to a permanent site on Darlaston Lane.. The first school leavers of the new site were Class of 2007 and Class of 2009.

== Campus Facilities ==
The school has a wide range of modern facilities designed to support students' academic learning, physical fitness, creativity as well as spiritual and personal development. The school has dedicated science laboratories, a library, ICT Suite, Drama theatre, 250 Seat theatre and main hall as well as a dedicated chapel for religious observance. There is also a Sixth Form Study Centre and Bistro for those in Year 12 and 13.

Sports facilities include a large sports hall, a climbing wall and fitness equipment, and professional standard playing fields. One particularly interesting feature is that the school is directly adjacent to the GOALS five-a-side football complex.

== Academic Standards ==
After their inspection in October 2007, Ofsted rated the school as Satisfactory, point 3 on a four-point scale. They said "St Thomas More is an inclusive, popular school with a growing sixth form, which is well supported by parents and the local community. Its overall effectiveness is satisfactory .... Achievement is satisfactory and standards are average across the school ... The school consistently delivers a high level of care and support for its students. The curriculum is developing well, and is good. Specialist status is managed well and has had a positive impact on much of the school's work."

Standards improved in 2008. The proportion of students gaining at least five GCSE grades at C or above increased from 46% in 2007, to 59%. The most significant increase took place in science, where the percentage of students attaining grades A* to C increased from 33% to 61.5%. After numerous OFSTED inspections, since 2007, the school was inspected during February 2016 and secured a 'Good' rating and the school was praised for its significant improvements. The school was inspected again in November 2019 under a section 8 inspection and found that “St Thomas More Catholic School continues to be a good school” and the ethos and community environment of the school was praised highly as well as student conduct.

== Change in Leadership ==
Mr Sean Flynn, announced that he would retire from his post as Headteacher at the end of the Autumn Term academic year 2012/2013, Miss Angela Whelan was assigned as Acting Headteacher.

Mr Peter Mayland was appointed as Headteacher in 2014. In Spring 2015 Mayland resigned citing personal reasons. Dr Sarah Hatfield was appointed initially as Acting Headteacher, eventually taking the post permanently. Dr Hatfield resigned from post in 2018 and Mrs Siobhan Bowen would act as Acting Headteacher. Mrs Siobhan Bowen was formerly a Religious Education teacher at the school.

On 25 May 2018 it was announced that the Board of Governors of St Thomas More had successfully appointed Mrs Siobhan Bowen as the permanent Headteacher.

== Extracurricular Activities ==
Students earned a place in the Guinness Book of Records, in 1998, with the world's largest set of wind chimes.

== Uniform Policy ==
Students are expected to wear a uniform made up of a Black Blazer which bears the schools crest, Black Trousers or Skirt (Knee High), Black Shoe, White Shirt. In addition to a school tie which changes colour dependent on the school year of the students.

On 30 April 2012, after taking into consideration feedback from the school community it was announced that the Physical Education Uniform would be completely overhauled to a black, red and white coloured kit as their former kit consisted of red shorts, blue jumpers and blue football socks with a white T-shirt.

== Former Staff ==
- Michael Hodgetts (1936-2022) - historian
