= Sam Layton =

Australian soccer player (born 1999)

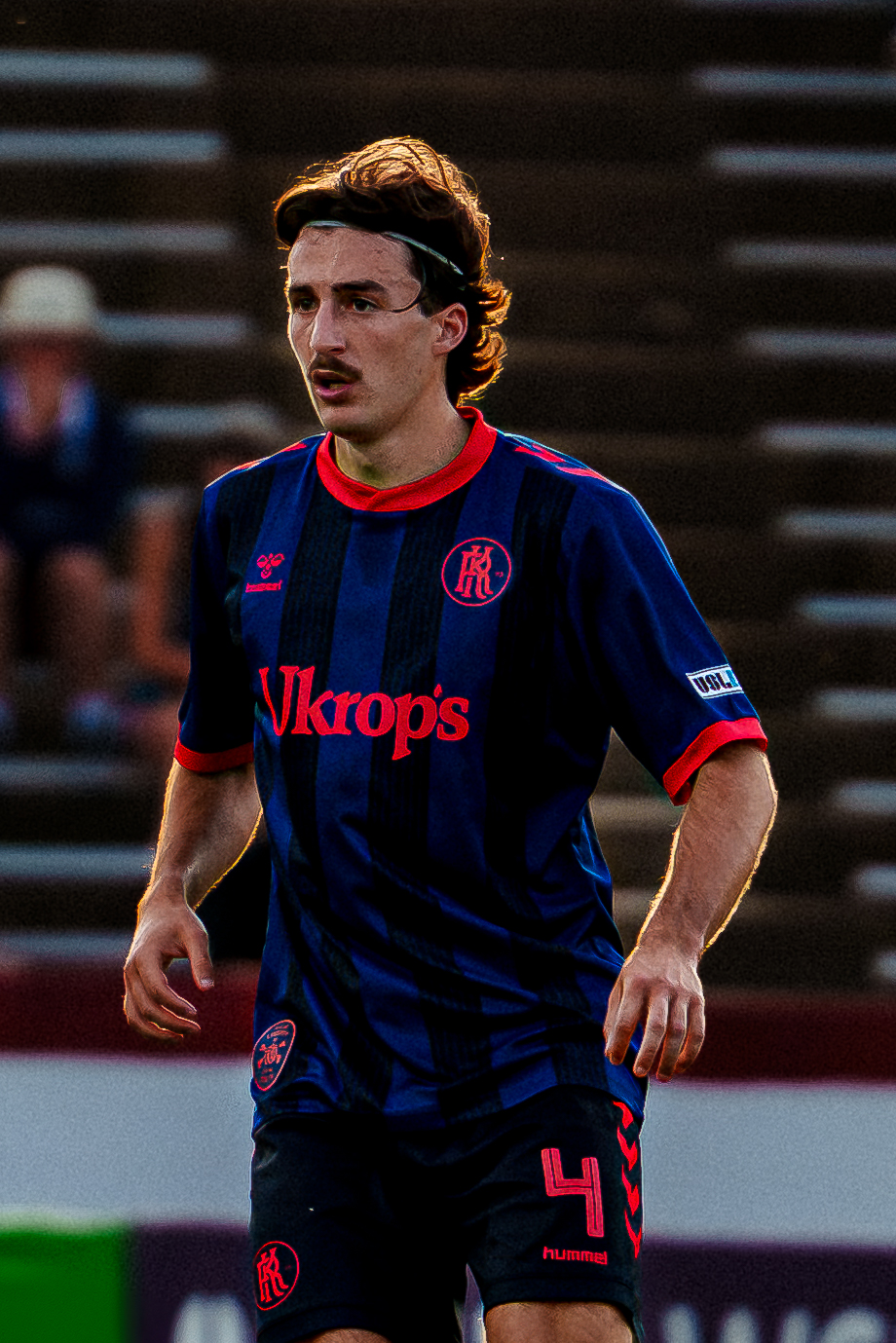
- Layton with the Richmond Kickers in 2026

Personal information
- Date of birth: 11 September 1999 (age 27)
- Place of birth: Brisbane, Australia
- Height: 1.88 m (6 ft 2 in)
- Positions: Center-back; defensive midfielder

Team information
- Current team: Richmond Kickers
- Number: 4

Youth career
- 2016–2018: Burnley Academy

College career
Years	Team	Apps	(Gls)
2019–2023	SIUE Cougars	53	(2)
2023–2024	Syracuse Orange	50	(4)

Senior career*
Years	Team	Apps	(Gls)
2024	Vermont Green	15	(2)
2025	Gold Coast Knights	20	(2)
2026–	Richmond Kickers	31	(0)
- * Club domestic league appearances and goals as of November 2, 2026

Sam Layton (born 11 September 1999) is an Australian professional soccer player that plays as a center-back and defensive midfielder for the Richmond Kickers in USL League One.

== Early life ==
Sam Layton was born in Brisbane, Australia on 11 September 1999. After he was release from Burnley in the summer of 2018, he worked at Domino's while still in England.

== Youth and college career ==
He started his career for the Burnley U-18 academy in 2016. He would leave the club in 2018. After his release from Burnley, he worked at Domino's.

He would however, move to the United States, to play for SIUE Cougars in college. He would make a total of 53 appearances and scoring two goals. He would then move to Syracuse Orange and play 50 games and score a total of four goals.

== Professional career ==
On 10 April 2024, while still in college, he signed for Vermont Green in USL League Two. He would make a total of 15 appearances and two goals in the 2024 season.

=== Gold Coast Knights ===
On 1 January 2025, Layton joined the Gold Coast Knights returning to Australia. He would make a total of 20 appearances and scoring two goals.

=== Richmond Kickers ===
On 17 December 2025, Layton signed for the Richmond Kickers in USL League One. He made his debut for the club in the opening match of the season, in a 1–1 draw against AV Alta. He scored his first goal for the Kickers in 2–1 victory against Charlotte Independence in the USL Cup.
