= Matt Bentley (footballer) =

English footballer (born 1998)

Personal information
- Date of birth: 23 May 1998 (age 28)
- Place of birth: Leytonstone, England
- Position: Forward

Team information
- Current team: Chattanooga Red Wolves
- Number: 10

College career
| Years | Team | Apps | (Gls) |
| 2016–2018 | West Virginia Wesleyan Bobcats | 54 | (25) |
| 2019 | Missouri State Bears | 20 | (15) |

Senior career*
| Years | Team | Apps | (Gls) |
| 2018–2019 | GPS Portland Phoenix | 16 | (8) |
| 2020–2021 | Basildon United | 0 | (0) |
| 2021 | Hornchurch | 8 | (2) |
| 2021 | Lionsbridge | 16 | (9) |
| 2021 | Dover Athletic | 7 | (0) |
| 2021 | Leatherhead | 6 | (4) |
| 2022–2023 | Richmond Kickers | 55 | (7) |
| 2024–2025 | Maidstone United | 31 | (6) |
| 2025– | Chattanooga Red Wolves | 61 | (12) |
- * Club domestic league appearances and goals as of October 31, 2026

Matthew Bentley (born 23 May 1998) is an English professional footballer who plays as a forward for USL League One club Chattanooga Red Wolves.

== Career ==
=== Amateur and college ===
Born in Leytonstone, Bentley went to Trinity Catholic High School, Woodford Green near Woodford Green during his teenage years. In 2016, Bentley headed to the United States, through the U.S Sports Scholarships organization, which helps English footballers attend an American post-secondary institution to earn a degree and play college soccer.

Bentley would move to the United States to play college soccer for the West Virginia Wesleyan Bobcats for his freshman through junior seasons. In his time at West Virginia Wesleyan, Bentley made 54 appearances, scoring 25 goals.

Ahead of his senior season, Bentley transferred from West Virginia Wesleyan to Missouri State University. During the 2019 NCAA Division I men's soccer season, Bentley helped Missouri State achieve a program-best 18–1–1 record, including their first ever top-10 ranking from United Soccer Coaches. Bentley finished with 15 goals in 20 appearances for the Bears. His performance earned him a First-Team All-American honor from United Soccer Coaches, for being one of the top college soccer players in the United States. Bentley became the first footballer from Missouri State University to earn the honor.

=== Professional ===
On 13 January 2020 Bentley was selected by Major League Soccer club, Minnesota United FC, in the fourth round with the 88th overall pick in the 2020 MLS SuperDraft, however, after being with the club during pre-season for a month, he was released by United on 23 February 2020.

Following the release from Minnesota United, Bentley returned to his native England where on 21 August 2020, he signed with Basildon United of the Isthmian League, the seventh division of English football. Bentley never played a competitive match for them, due to COVID-19, and subsequently left the club. On 25 February 2021, Bentley transferred to fellow Isthmian League side, Hornchurch, where he played with the club until the conclusion of the 2020–21 Isthmian League.

Following the conclusion of the Isthmian League season, Bentley returned to the United States for the summer and joined Lionsbridge FC of USL League Two, the fourth division of American soccer, for the 2021 season. With Lionsbridge, Bentley made 16 appearances, scoring nine goals, and providing three assists. Following the conclusion of the USL League Two season, Bentley returned to his native England to play for Dover Athletic of the National League, where he was announced as a signing on 22 September 2021. With Dover, Bentley made 7 total appearances.

On 26 November 2021, Bentley joined Leatherhead of the Isthmian League.

Ahead of the 2022 USL League One season, Bentley, returned to the United States again, and signed a professional contract with the Richmond Kickers on 16 December 2021. On 2 April 2022, Bentley made his professional debut for the Kickers against FC Tucson, coming on in the 68th minute for Dakota Barnathan. In the 81st minute of the match, Bentley scored his first professional goal, en route to a 4–0 victory.

In March 2024, Bentley's return to England was confirmed as he joined National League South club Maidstone United on a short-term contract until the end of the season. On 1 January 2025, it was confirmed that Bentley had his contract terminated to allow him to return to the United States to take up a university scholarship.

Bentley signed for USL League One club Chattanooga Red Wolves in February 2025.

== Honours ==
Individual

- United Soccer Coaches First-Team All-American: 2019
