= Valparaiso Crusaders men's soccer =

Valparaiso University in NCAA Division I soccer

- Founded: 1983
- Folded: 2019; 7 years ago
- University: Valparaiso University
- Head coach: Mike Avery
- Conference: MVC
- Location: Valparaiso, Indiana
- Stadium: Brown Field (capacity: 5,000)
- Nickname: Crusaders
- Colors: Brown and gold
Home	Away

NCAA Tournament appearances
- 1996

Conference Tournament championships
- Mid-Con 1996

Conference Regular Season championships
- Mid-Con 1997–98; Horizon 2011

The Valparaiso Crusaders men's soccer team represented Valparaiso University (Valpo) in NCAA Division I soccer competition as a member of the Missouri Valley Conference The Crusaders played home matches at Brown Field on the Valpo campus in Valparaiso, Indiana.

== History ==
Valparaiso began playing men's soccer in 1983. The Beacons were a charter member of the Association of Mid-Continent Universities in 1982 and entered Mid-Con soccer competition in 1988. In 2007, Valpo began a ten-year all-sports membership in the Horizon League. In May 2017, the Missouri Valley Conference extended an invitation for the Crusaders to join; after concluding conference play for the year, Valparaiso accepted the invitation on May 25, with the move being effective on July 1.

Following the 2019 NCAA Division I men's soccer season, Valparaiso cut the sport and men's tennis in order to allow greater attention to the school's other sports teams.

== Honors ==
=== Mid-Continent Conference ===
Player of the Year – J.J. Ruane, 1998

Newcomer of the Year – Scott Daly, 1998

All-Mid East - Tony Dal Santo 1997

1st Team All-Conference - Tony Dal Santo 1997

Offensive Player of the Year - Tony Dal Santo 1997

Team MVP - Tony Dal Santo 1997

All-Mid East - Tony Dal Santo 1996

1st Team All-Conference - Tony Dal Santo 1996

Offensive Player of the Year - Tony Dal Santo 1996

All-Tournament Team - Tony Dal Santo 1996

Conference Tournament MVP - Tony Dal Santo 1996

Coach of the Year – Mis’ Mrak. 1997, 1998, 2002

=== Horizon League ===
Defensive Player of the Year – Stefan Antonijevic, 2011

Goalkeeper of the Year – Ryan Schwarz, 2007; Kyle Zobeck, 2011 & 2012; Nico Campbell, 2015

Coach of the Year – Mike Avery, 2011

== Record by year ==
Season	Coach	Overall	Conference	Standing	Postseason
Valparaiso University (Division I Independent) (1983–1987)
1983	Danny Jeftich	5–6–0			
1984	Danny Jeftich	7–7–0			
1985	Danny Jeftich	8–9–1			
1986	Danny Jeftich	7–8–1			
1987	Danny Jeftich	9–6–1			
Valparaiso University (Mid-Continent Conference) (1988–2006)
1988	Danny Jeftich	5–8–3	0–4–1	5th of 6	
1989	Danny Jeftich	5–16–0	0–6–0	7th of 7	
1990	Danny Jeftich	4–15–1	0–7–0	8th of 8	
Danny Jeftich:		49–74–7 .404	0–17–1		
1991	Mis’ Mrak	6–11–2	1–6–0	t-8th of 9	
1992	Mis’ Mrak	1–17–1	0–7–0	8th of 8	
1993	Mis’ Mrak	2–17–0	0–7–0	8th of 8	
1994	Mis’ Mrak	2-13-1	2-4-0	3rd of 4 (East)	
1995	Mis’ Mrak	5-12-1	3-3-0	3rd of 4 (East)	
1996	Mis’ Mrak	6-13-3	3-3-0	t-2nd of 4 (East)	L-NCAA Play-in game
1997	Mis’ Mrak	8-12-1	6-1-1	1st of 5 (West)	
1998	Mis’ Mrak	6-11-1	3-1-1	1st of 6	
1999	Mis’ Mrak	5-11-1	2-3-0	t-4th of 6	
2000	Mis’ Mrak	5-10-0	1–4–0	6th of 6	
2001	Mis’ Mrak	6-10-1	1–3–1	6th of 6	
2002	Mis’ Mrak	5-10-2	2–2–1	3rd of 6	
2003	Mis’ Mrak	2-13-2	1–5–0	6th of 7	
2004	Mis’ Mrak	2-13-2	1-3-2	6th of 7	
2005	Mis’ Mrak	6-10-2	3-2-1	4th of 7	
2006	Mis’ Mrak	7-10-0	2–4–0	5th of 7	
Mis’ Mrak:		76–191–21 .300	31–58–7		
Valparaiso University (Horizon League) (2007–2016)
2007	Mike Avery	4-11-3	2-4-2	7th of 9	
2008	Mike Avery	6-10-3	1-6-1	8th of 9	
2009	Mike Avery	10-7-2	4-2-2	3rd of 9	
2010	Mike Avery	9-8-2	2-6-0	8th of 9	
2011	Mike Avery	9-6-5	5-1-2	1st of 9	
2012	Mike Avery	6-9-5	2–2–3	4th of 8	
2013	Mike Avery	5-8-5	2–3–2	6th of 8	
2014	Mike Avery	8-5-6	3–3–2	5th of 9	
2015	Mike Avery	7-6-5	3–3–3	7th of 10	
2016	Mike Avery	10-5-4	4–3–2	t-5th of 10	
Valparaiso University (Missouri Valley Conference) (2017–2019)
2017	Mike Avery	8–9–1	3–5–0	6th	
2018	Mike Avery	6–9–4	2–1–3	3rd	
2019	Mike Avery	4–13–1	3–7–0	5th	
Mike Avery:		93–107–46 .472	36–46–22		
Total:		218–372–74 .384	77–121–31		
National champion Postseason invitational champion Conference regular season champion Conference regular season and conference tournament champion Division regular season champion Division regular season and conference tournament champion Conference tournament champion
