= 2025 Richmond Kickers season =

Richmond Kickers
2025 season
- Chairman: 22 Holdings, LLC
- Manager: Darren Sawatzky
- Stadium: City Stadium
- USL League One: 13th
- Jägermeister Cup: Group stage
- U.S. Open Cup: First round
- Top goalscorer: League: Darwin Espinal (9 goals); All: Darwin Espinal (9 goals)
- Highest home attendance: 5,542 (v. AV Alta, 22 March 2025)
- Lowest home attendance: 2,827 (v. Union Omaha, 9 April 2025)
Home colours	Away colours	Third colours

The 2025 Richmond Kickers season was the club's 33rd season in existence, their seventh season in USL League One, and their 21st season in the third tier of American soccer. The Kickers were led by sixth-year head coach, Darren Sawatzky. Their USL League One season started on March 7, 2025. This is the first season since 2020 without Zacarías Morán, Nathan Aune, Chris Cole, and Nil Vinyals.

The Kickers worsened in their regular season, finishing 13th in League One, and failed to qualify for the playoffs for the first time since 2023. They also finished 13th their worst position in their USL League One era since their move to the league in its inaugural season, it also their worst since 2023, which in that season they finished 11th.

== Background ==
The 2024 season was the club's 32nd season of existence, their fifth season in USL League One, and fourth year under head coach Darren Sawatzky. The Kickers improved from the previous season getting of 6 wins, fifth-teen losses, and eleven draws. With Chandler O'Dwyer leading the club with only eight goals.

Outside of USL League One, the Kickers participated in the U.S. Open Cup, and the league playoffs, which they qualified with an 8th place finish during the regular season. The Kickers reached the third round in the U.S. Open Cup losing to Loudoun United on penalties. The Kickers began the Playoffs on November 3, but would get eliminated in the Quarterfinals.

== Players and staff ==
As of 10 July 2025 Note: Flags indicate national team as defined under FIFA eligibility rules; some limited exceptions apply. Players may hold more than one non-FIFA nationality.

No.	Pos.	Nation	Player
1	GK	CHI	Pablo Jara
2	DF	USA	Dakota Barnathan
3	MF	USA	Hayden Anderson
4	DF	USA	Simon Fitch
5	DF	CHI	Maxi Schenfeld
6	MF	USA	Ryan Baer (on loan from Tacoma Defiance)
7	MF	USA	Landon Johnson
9	FW	USA	Josh Kirkland
10	MF	GER	Nils Seufert
11	MF	HAI	Melvin Pierre-Louis
14	DF	BRA	Gui França
16	DF	CAN	Klaidi Cela
17	MF	ENG	James Vaughan
18	MF	UGA	Jonathan Kanagwa

No.	Pos.	Nation	Player
19	FW	HON	Darwin Espinal
20	FW	GER	Adrian Billhardt
25	DF	USA	Marcelo Lage
27	MF	ENG	Chandler O'Dwyer
32	FW	ARG	Emiliano Terzaghi
33	FW	USA	Matt Bolduc
34	DF	USA	Beckett Howell
35	GK	USA	James Sneddon
38	DF	USA	Griffin Garnett
40	FW	USA	Nick Sarantakos
41	DF	USA	Brendan Dobzyniak
42	DF	USA	Grafton Kahl
43	MF	USA	Andrew Richman

=== Technical staff ===
Position	Name
Head Coach & Technical Director	Darren Sawatzky
Head Assistant Coach	Mika Elovaara
Assistant Coach	Conner Cappelletti
Goalkeeping Coach	Evan Munn

== Transfers ==
=== Transfers in ===
Date	Position	No.	Name	From	Fee	Ref.
December 18, 2024	MF	11	(Haiti) Rivendi Pierre-Lewis	(United States) FC Motown	Free	
January 22, 2025	FW	19	(Honduras) Darwin Espinal	(United States) Maryland Bobcats	Free	
January 23, 2025	MF	3	(United States) Hayden Anderson	(United States) Greenville Triumph	Free	
January 24, 2025	MF	10	(Germany) Nils Seufert	(Norway) Jerv	Free	
January 27, 2025	GK	35	(United States) James Sneddon	(United States) Richmond Strikers	Free	
January 31, 2025	FW	40	(United States) Nick Sarrantos	(United States) Richmond Strikers	Academy contract	
January 31, 2025	MF	42	(United States) Grafton Kahl	(United States) Richmond Strikers	Academy contract	
January 31, 2025	DF	39	(United States) Brendan Dobzyniak	(United States) Richmond Strikers	Academy contract	
January 31, 2025	DF	41	(United States) Andrew Richman	(United States) Richmond Strikers	Academy contract	
February 6, 2025	DF	15	(Uganda) Jonathan Kanagwa	(United States) VCU Rams	Free	
February 18, 2025	FW	33	(United States) Matt Bolduc	Free Agent	Free	
May 6, 2025	MF	43	(United States) Jonathan Gomez	(United States) Richmond Strikers	Academy contract	
July 9, 2025	MF	6	(United States) Ryan Baer	(United States) Tacoma Defiance	Loan deal	
July 10, 2025	DF	25	(United States) Marcelo Lage	(United States) Spokane Velocity	$170k	

=== Transfers out ===
Date	Position	No.	Name	From	Fee	Ref.
August 1, 2024	MF	33	(United States) Gabe Cox	(United States) Furman Paladins	Free	
August 1, 2024	DF	39	(United States) Noah Hiort-Wright	(United States) College of William & Mary	Free	
August 1, 2024	MF	37	(Jamaica) Nicholas Simmonds	Richmond Strikers	Academy Contract expired	
December 1, 2024	MF	6	(Argentina) Zacarías Morán	(Spain) CA Pulpileño	Free	
December 1, 2024	MF	8	(Brazil) João Silva	(United States) Northern Virginia FC	Free	
December 1, 2024	FW	15	(United States) Tony Pineda	(United States) Carolina Core	Free	
December 1, 2024	MF	19	(United States) Justin Sukow	Retired		
December 1, 2024	FW	9	(United States) Arthur Bosua	Retired		
December 1, 2024	DF	24	(United States) Nathan Aune	Unattached	Free	
December 1, 2024	DF	3	(United States) Chris Cole	Unattached	Free	
December 1, 2024	FW	15	(United States) Tony Pineda	(United States) Carolina Core	Free	
January 5, 2025	GK	13	(United States) Ryan Shellow	Retired	Free	
January 6, 2025	FW	11	(United States) Ryan Sierakowski	Retired		
February 21, 2025	MF	10	(Spain) Nil Vinyals	(United States) Spokane Velocity	Free	

== Non-competitive ==
=== Friendlies ===
July 16 Friendly	Richmond Kickers (United States)	1–1	(Spain) Leganés	Richmond, VA
7:30 PM EDT	O'Dwyer 27'		García 34'	Stadium: City Stadium

== Competitions ==
=== USL League One ===
==== Table ====
Pos	Team	Pld	W	L	T	GF	GA	GD	Pts
10	Forward Madison FC	30	8	11	11	31	43	−12	35
11	Greenville Triumph SC	30	8	14	8	38	43	−5	32
12	Texoma FC	30	7	14	9	35	55	−20	30
13	Richmond Kickers	30	8	17	5	43	53	−10	29
14	Westchester SC	30	5	16	9	43	59	−16	24

Source: USL League One
Rules for classification: 1) points; 2) total wins; 3) total goal differential; 4) total goals scored; 5) points earned against top four finishers; 6) disciplinary points; 7) drawing of lots.

==== Matches ====
March 7 1	South Georgia Tormenta	2–4	Richmond Kickers	Statesboro, GA
7:00 p.m. EDT	Tunbridge 24', 45+1'	Report	Anderson 19'; Cela (yellow card) 23'; O'Dwyer 34'; Barnathan 41', (yellow card) 45+3'; Seufert 74'	Stadium: Optim Sports Medicine Field; Attendance: 911; Referee: John Motto; Assistant referees: Hillis Waddell; Patrick Slane; Fourth official: Amin Hadzic

March 15 2	Charlotte Independence	1–0	Richmond Kickers	Charlotte, NC
7:00 p.m. EDT	Sorenson 50'	Report		Stadium: American Legion Memorial Stadium; Attendance: 956; Referee: Joe Surgan; Assistant referees: Max Smith; Audra Fullen; Fourth official: Lauren Aldrich

March 22 3	Richmond Kickers	3–1	AV Alta	Richmond, VA
6:00 p.m. EDT	O'Dwyer 45+1'; Terzaghi 51', 73'	Report	Cerritos 8'; Alassane (red card) 74'	Stadium: City Stadium; Attendance: 5,542; Referee: Deshun Beard; Assistant referees: Chris Schurfranz; Adam Cook; Fourth official: Amelia Graytock

March 29 4	Richmond Kickers	1–2	Forward Madison	Richmond, VA
6:00 p.m. EDT	Espinal 50'	Report	Gebhard 40', 48'	Stadium: City Stadium; Attendance: 4,576; Referee: Deny Kulasinac; Assistant referees: Sarah Gaddes; Fourth official: Nicholas Karnovsky

April 9 5	Richmond Kickers	1–0	Union Omaha	Richmond, VA
7:00 p.m. EDT	Espinal 82'	Report		Stadium: City Stadium; Attendance: 2,827; Referee: Ryan Homik; Assistant referees: Patrick Slane; Fourth official: Arman Becan

April 12 6	FC Naples	2–1	Richmond Kickers	Collier County, FL
7:00 p.m. EDT	Ferrín 8'; Henderlong 22'	Report	Espinal 35'	Stadium: Paradise Coast Sports Complex; Attendance: 4,005; Referee: Amin Hadzic; Assistant referees: Alexandru Focea; Fourth official: Kyle Cividanes

April 19 7	Richmond Kickers	4–4	Westchester	Richmond, VA
6:00 p.m. EDT	Espinal 2', 32'; Kirkland 63', 90+9'	Report	Powder 8'; Powder 53'; McGlynn 83'; Obregón 90+7' (pen.)	Stadium: City Stadium; Referee: Marie Durr; Assistant referees: Robert Cordley; Fourth official: Chuck Roberts

May 2 8	Richmond Kickers	3−3	Greenville Triumph	Richmond, VA
7:00 p.m. EDT	Kirkland 3', 39'; O'Dwyer 80'	Report	Evans 31'; Zakowski 33'; Agyaakwah 84'	Stadium: City Stadium; Attendance: 5,023; Referee: Edson Carvajal; Assistant referees: Andrew Charron; Fourth official: Nickrod Fateh

May 10 9	Chattanooga Red Wolves	0–0	Richmond Kickers	East Ridge, TN
7:00 p.m. EDT		Report		Stadium: CHI Memorial Stadium; Referee: Muhammad Kaleida; Assistant referees: Brian Marshall; Fourth official: Amin Hadzic

May 18 10	Spokane Velocity	1–0	Richmond Kickers	Spokane, WA
7:00 p.m. EDT	Miller (red card); Peláez 44'	Report		Stadium: One Spokane Stadium; Attendance: 2,644; Referee: Calin Radosav; Assistant referees: Ryan Jung; Fourth official: Serghei Celan

May 25 11	Westchester	2–2	Richmond Kickers	Mt Vernon, NY
2:00 p.m. EDT	Saydee 9'; Obregón 29'	Report	Espinal 32'; Bolduc 47'	Stadium: The Stadium at Memorial Field; Referee: Muhammad Hassan

June 7 12	Richmond Kickers	1–2	Texoma	Richmond, VA
7:00 p.m. EDT	Kirkland 7'		Baker 19'; Asanté 73'	Stadium: City Stadium; Attendance: 3,908; Referee: Servando Berna Rico

June 21 13	Richmond Kickers	0–1	Spokane Velocity	Richmond, VA
7:00 p.m. EDT		Report	Brett 7'	Stadium: City Stadium; Attendance: 3,879; Referee: Atahan Yaya

June 25 14	Union Omaha	3–4	Richmond Kickers	Papillion, NE
8:00 p.m. EDT	Faz 21'; Gallardo 58' (pen.); Bronnik 84'		Billhardt 12'; Knapp 14' (o.g.); Kirkland 44', 50'	Stadium: Werner Park; Attendance: 2,388

July 12 15	Richmond Kickers	0–2	Chattanooga Red Wolves	Richmond, VA
7:00 p.m. EDT		Report	Bentley 68' (pen.); Lombardi 73'	Stadium: City Stadium; Attendance: 4,661

July 20 16	Greenville Triumph	2–0	Richmond Kickers	Greenville, SC
7:00 p.m. EDT	Herrera 20' (pen.); Sims 72'			Stadium: Paladin Stadium; Attendance: 1,643

August 2 17	Richmond Kickers	1–2	Naples	Richmond, VA
7:00 p.m. EDT	Johnson 12'		Purpa 59'; Henderlong 63'	Stadium: City Stadium; Attendance: 4,393

August 9 18	Hearts of Pine	0–0	Richmond Kickers	Portland, MN
5:00 p.m. EDT				Stadium: Fitzpatrick Stadium; Attendance: 5,796; Referee: Atayan Yaya

August 16 19	Richmond Kickers	2–3	South Georgia Tormenta	Richmond, VA
7:00 p.m. EDT	Cela 40'; Espinal 70'		Tunbridge 19' (pen.); Cabral 31'; Reid-Stephen 73'	Stadium: City Stadium; Attendance: 4,094; Referee: Atayan Yaya

August 21 20	One Knoxville	2–0	Richmond Kickers	Knoxville, TN
7:00 p.m. EDT	Gøling 15'; Diene 53'			Stadium: Covenant Health Park; Attendance: 4,126; Referee: Trevor Wiseman
Note: The match was supposed to take place on June 13

August 23 21	Richmond Kickers	1–0	One Knoxville	Richmond, VA
7:00 p.m. EDT	Lage 33'			Stadium: City Stadium; Attendance: 4,126; Referee: Atayan Yaya

September 3 22	Westchester	0–2	Richmond Kickers	Mount Vernon, NY
7:00 p.m. EDT			Terzaghi 8'; Johnson 45+1'	Stadium: The Stadium at Memorial Field; Attendance: 1,209; Referee: Izlen Peksenar

September 13 23	Forward Madison	1–0	Richmond Kickers	Madison, WI
7:00 p.m. EDT	Sousa 90+3'			Stadium: Breese Stevens Field; Attendance: 5,010; Referee: Drew Klemp

September 17 24	Richmond Kickers	2–5	Portland Hearts of Pine	Richmond, VA
6:30 p.m. EDT	Espinal 21'; Anderson 76'		Varela 12'; Wright 27' (pen.); Wada 52', 69', 84'	Stadium: City Stadium; Attendance: 3,242; Referee: Katja Koroleva

September 20 25	Richmond Kickers	2–3	Charlotte Independence	Richmond, VA
6:00 p.m. EDT	Espinal 38'; O'Dwyer 90' (pen.)		Chaney 34', 53'; Ndiaye 45'	Stadium: City Stadium; Attendance: 4,285

September 27 26	South Georgia Tormenta	4–2	Richmond Kickers	Statesboro, GA
7:00 p.m. EDT	Bazini 17'; Reid-Stephen 20', 76'; Gray 69'		Seufert 53'; Kirkland 72'	Stadium: Tormenta Stadium; Referee: Drew Klemp

October 4 27	Richmond Kickers	2–1	One Knoxville	Richmond, VA
6:00 p.m. EDT	Billhardt 23'; Schenfeld 40'		Brown 34'	Stadium: City Stadium; Attendance: 5,509; Referee: Carlos Rodriguez

October 11 28	Texoma	1–0	Richmond Kickers	Sherman, TX
8:00 p.m. EDT	McManus 59'			Stadium: Historic Bearcat Stadium; Attendance: 1,576; Referee: Muhammad Hassan

October 17 29	AV Alta	2–0	Richmond Kickers	Lancaster, CA
10:30 p.m. EDT	Cerritos 40'; Villalobos 61'			Stadium: Lancaster Municipal Stadium; Attendance: 5,251; Referee: Matthew Thompson

October 25 30	Richmond Kickers	5–1	Forward Madison	Richmond, VA
6:00 p.m. EDT	Seufert 36', 71'; Terzaghi 38'; Lage 45+3'; Billhardt 63'		Dourado 23'	Stadium: City Stadium; Attendance: 5,509; Referee: Carlos Rodriguez

=== U.S. Open Cup ===
March 19 First round	Richmond Kickers (USL1) (Virginia)	1–3	Virginia Dream FC (VSSL)	Richmond, VA
7:30 p.m. EDT	Vaughan 45+1'		Lukulia 8' (pen.); Suchecki 53'; Akinkoye 61'	Stadium: City Stadium; Referee: John Griggs

=== Jägermeister Cup ===
==== Group stage ====
Pos	Lg	Team	Pld	W	PKW	PKL	L	GF	GA	GD	Pts	Qualification
1	USLC	Loudoun United FC	4	2	1	1	0	5	3	+2	9	Advance to knockout stage
2	USL1	Charlotte Independence	4	2	1	1	0	8	4	+4	9	
3	USLC	Louisville City FC	4	3	0	0	1	8	4	+4	9	
4	USLC	Lexington SC	4	1	0	1	2	6	5	+1	4	
5	USLC	North Carolina FC	4	1	1	0	2	3	4	−1	5	
6	USL1	Richmond Kickers	4	0	0	0	4	1	11	−10	0	

Updated to match(es) played on July 26, 2025. Source: USL
Rules for classification: 1) points; 2) head-to-head points earned in group play; 3) total wins in group play; 4) goals for in group play; 5) goals against in group play; 6) disciplinary points; 7) coin toss.

===== Matches =====
April 26 1	Louisville City	4–1	Richmond Kickers	Louisville, KY
7:30 p.m. EDT	Perez 45+3'; Serrano 55'; Gleadle 62'; Perez 87'	Report	Seufert 58'	Stadium: Lynn Family Stadium; Referee: Drew Klempt; Assistant referees: Christian Little; Fourth official: Donald Williams

May 31 2	Richmond Kickers	0–1	North Carolina	Richmond, VA
7:00 p.m. EDT			Luckhurst 81'	Stadium: City Stadium; Attendance: 4,753; Referee: Alex Beehler

June 28 3	Richmond Kickers	0–3	Lexington SC	Richmond, VA
7:00 PM EDT			Ajago 10'; Epps 31'; Burke 90'	Stadium: City Stadium; Attendance: 3,290

July 26 4	Charlotte Independence	3–0	Richmond Kickers	Charlotte, NC
7:00 PM EDT	Jauregui 11'; Moshobane 51'; Ousmanou 90+5'			Stadium: American Legion Memorial Stadium; Attendance: 628; Referee: Luis Arroyo

== Statistics ==
=== Appearances and goals ===
As of November 24, 2025. Numbers after plus–sign (+) denote appearances as a substitute.

No.	Pos	Nat	Player	Total		USL1		USL.1 Playoffs		U.S. Open Cup		Jägermeister Cup	
No.	Pos	Nat	Player	Apps	Goals	Apps	Goals	Apps	Goals	Apps	Goals	Apps	Goals
1	GK	(Chile) CHI	Pablo Jara	9	0	3+1	0	0+0	0	1+0	0	4+0	0
2	MF	(United States) USA	Dakota Barnathan	29	1	25+0	1	0+0	0	1+0	0	3+0	0
3	MF	(United States) USA	Hayden Anderson	30	2	7+19	2	0+0	0	0+0	0	3+1	0
4	DF	(United States) USA	Simon Fitch	35	0	30+0	0	0+0	0	1+0	0	4+0	0
5	DF	(Chile) CHI	Maxi Schenfeld	27	1	19+5	1	0+0	0	1+0	0	0+2	0
6	MF	(United States) USA	Ryan Baer	10	0	4+6	0	0+0	0	0+0	0	0+0	0
7	FW	(United States) USA	Landon Johnson	18	2	4+11	2	0+0	0	0+0	0	2+1	0
9	FW	(United States) USA	Josh Kirkland	33	8	22+7	8	0+0	0	1+0	0	3+0	0
10	MF	(Germany) GER	Nils Seufert	32	5	26+2	4	0+0	0	1+0	0	3+0	1
11	MF	(Haiti) HAI	Rivendi Pierre-Lewis	5	0	0+3	0	0+0	0	0+0	0	0+2	0
14	DF	(Brazil) BRA	Guilherme França	21	0	10+6	0	0+0	0	1+0	0	3+1	0
16	DF	(Canada) CAN	Klaidi Cela	21	1	16+2	1	0+0	0	0+1	0	1+1	0
17	MF	(England) ENG	James Vaughan	20	1	7+10	0	0+0	0	1+0	1	1+1	0
18	MF	(Uganda) UGA	Jonathan Kanagwa	11	0	1+8	0	0+0	0	0+0	0	1+1	0
19	FW	(Honduras) HON	Darwin Espinal	29	9	25+1	9	0+0	0	1+0	0	2+0	0
20	MF	(Germany) GER	Adrian Billhardt	24	3	7+15	3	0+0	0	0+1	0	0+1	0
25	DF	(United States) USA	Marcelo Lage	7	2	6+0	2	0+0	0	0+0	0	1+0	0
27	FW	(England) ENG	Chandler O'Dwyer	31	4	23+5	4	0+0	0	0+1	0	1+1	0
32	FW	(Argentina) ARG	Emiliano Terzaghi	26	4	19+5	4	0+0	0	0+1	0	0+1	0
33	MF	(United States) USA	Matt Bolduc	17	1	7+7	1	0+0	0+0	1+0	0	1+1	0
34	DF	(United States) USA	Beckett Howell	25	0	15+6	0	0+0	0	0+0	0	4+0	0
35	GK	(United States) USA	James Sneddon	27	0	27+0	0	0+0	0	0+0	0	0+0	0
38	DF	(United States) USA	Griffin Garnett	25	0	17+4	0	0+0	0	1+0	0	3+0	0
39	DF	(United States) USA	Brendan Dobzyniak	1	0	0+0	0	0+0	0	0+0	0	0+1	0
40	FW	(United States) USA	Nick Sarantakos	1	0	0+0	0	0+0	0	0+0	0	0+1	0
41	MF	(United States) USA	Andrew Richman	1	0	0+1	0	0+0	0	0+0	0	0+0	0
42	DF	(United States) USA	Grafton Kahl	3	0	0+2	0	0+0	0	0+0	0	0+1	0
43	MF	(United States) USA	Jonathan Gomez	1	0	0+0	0	0+0	0	0+0	0	0+1	0
