= 2024 Richmond Kickers season =

Richmond Kickers
2024 season
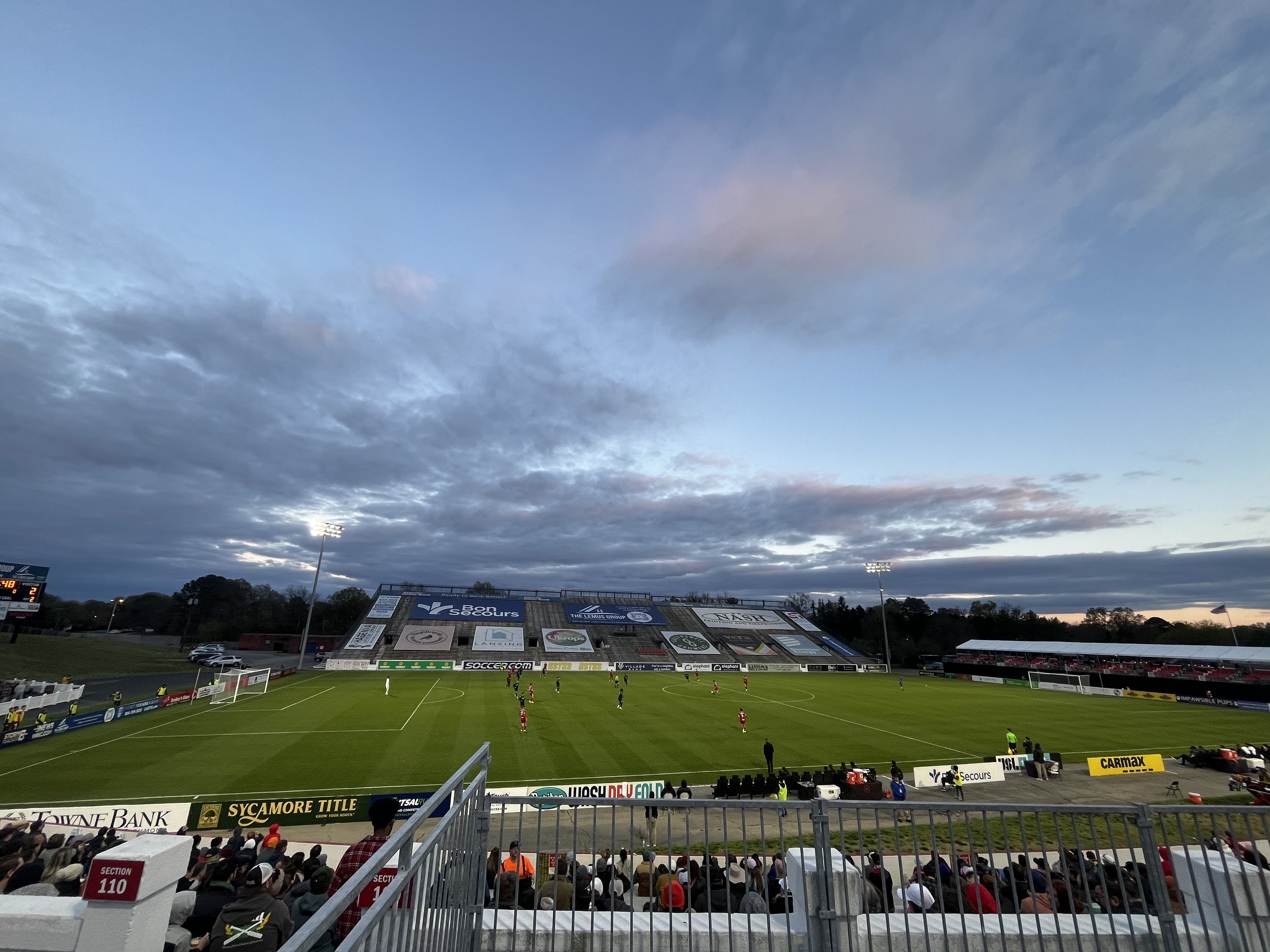
- Kickers vs Fuego in April 2024
- Owner: 22 Holdings, LLC
- Head coach: Darren Sawatzky
- Stadium: City Stadium
- USL League One: 8th
- USL1 Playoffs: Quarterfinals
- U.S. Open Cup: Third round
- Jägermeister Cup: Group stage
- Top goalscorer: League: Chandler O'Dwyer (6); All: Chandler O'Dwyer (9)
| Home colors | Away colors | Third colors |

The 2024 Richmond Kickers season was the club's 32nd season in existence, their sixth season in USL League One, and their 20th season in the third tier of American soccer. The Kickers are led by fifth-year head coach, Darren Sawatzky.

The Kickers improved on their regular season fortunes, finishing 8th in League One, qualifying for the playoffs for the first time since 2022.

This will be the first season since 2018 without Luke Pavone and Akira Fitzgerald who both left and joined Phuket Andaman and North Carolina FC respectively after five seasons with Richmond.

== Transfers ==
=== Transfers in ===
| Date | Position | No. | Name | From | Fee/notes | Ref. |
|---|---|---|---|---|---|---|
| December 13, 2023 | GK | 1 | (Chile) Pablo Jara | (United States) Tormenta | Free | |
| January 4, 2024 | DF | 14 | (Brazil) Guilherme França | (United States) Dalton State Roadrunners | Free | |
| January 9, 2024 | MF | 17 | (England) James Vaughan | (England) Welling United | Free | |
| January 16, 2024 | FW | 9 | (South Africa) Arthur Bosua | (United States) Tormenta | Free | |
| January 18, 2024 | DF | 5 | (Chile) Maxi Schenfeld | (United States) Harrisburg Heat | Free | |
| January 23, 2024 | DF | 15 | (United States) Toni Pineda | (United States) High Point Panthers | Free | |
| February 1, 2024 | GK | 13 | (United States) Ryan Shellow | (United States) Detroit City | Free | |
| February 20, 2024 | MF | 20 | (Germany) Adrian Billhardt | (United States) Detroit City | Free | |
| March 13, 2024 | MF | 38 | (United States) Griffin Garnett | (United States) Richmond Strikers | Academy contract | |
| March 13, 2024 | DF | 39 | (United States) Noah Hiort-Wright | (United States) Richmond Strikers | Academy contract | |
| August 13, 2024 | DF | 16 | (Canada) Klaidi Cela | (Kosovo) Liria Prizren | Free | |
| September 12, 2024 | FW | 45 | (United States) Josh Kirkland | Free Agent | Free | |

=== Transfers out ===
| Date | Position | No. | Name | To | Fee/notes | Ref. |
|---|---|---|---|---|---|---|
| December 4, 2023 | FW | 7 | (United States) Ethan Vanacore-Decker | (United States) Jackson Lions | Free | |
| December 4, 2023 | FW | 9 | (England) Matt Bentley | (England) Maidstone United | Free | |
| December 4, 2023 | FW | 11 | (United States) David Olsen | None | Free | |
| December 4, 2023 | DF | 14 | (United States) Luke Pavone | (Thailand) Phuket Andaman | Free | |
| December 4, 2023 | DF | 16 | (United States) Jake Mecham | None | Free | |
| December 20, 2023 | GK | 1 | (Japan) Akira Fitzgerald | (United States) North Carolina FC | Free | |
| January 16, 2024 | FW | 91 | (Jamaica) Owayne Gordon | (Jamaica) Montego Bay United | Free | |
| March 4, 2024 | DF | 25 | (Germany) Michael Hornsby | (New Zealand) Christchurch United | Free | |
| March 13, 2024 | FW | 99 | (Grenada) Kharlton Belmar | (United States) Charlotte Independence | Free | |
| March 15, 2024 | DF | 31 | (Brazil) Otavio Zerbini | (United States) Charlotte Independence | | |

== Non-competitive ==
=== Preseason exhibitions ===
| February 10 | Richmond Kickers | 1–0 | VCU Rams | Glen Allen, Virginia |
| 11:00 EST | Sierakowski 37' | Report | | Stadium: VACU Field; Attendance: 0 |

| February 14 | Richmond Kickers | 5–1 | Alexandria Reds | Bensley, Virginia |
| 20:00 EST | Bosua 14'; Billhardt 28', 51'; Vaughan 34'; Sukow 84' | Report | Hayes III 64' | Stadium: Ukrop Park; Attendance: 0 |

| February 17 | Loudoun United | 2–2 | Richmond Kickers | Leesburg, Virginia |
| 12:00 EST | Valot 56'; Erlandson 72' | Report | Gomiero 61'; Cox 68' | Stadium: Segra Field; Attendance: 100 |

| February 21 | Richmond Kickers | 4–1 | Chowan Hawks | Glen Allen, Virginia |
| 19:00 EST | Vinyals 23', 64'; Sierakowski 36', 75' | Report | Binns 14' | Stadium: VACU Field; Attendance: 140 |

| February 24 | Richmond Kickers | 1–1 | James Madison Dukes | Glen Allen, Virginia |
| 14:00 EST | O'Dwyer 37' | | Krakowiak 56' | Stadium: VACU Field; Attendance: 0 |

| February 28 | Richmond Kickers | 2–3 | Loudoun United | Glen Allen, Virginia |
| 12:00 EST | | | | Stadium: VACU Field; Attendance: 200 |

| March 2 | Richmond Kickers | 2–0 | George Mason Patriots | Richmond, Virginia |
| 14:00 EST | | | | Stadium: City Stadium; Attendance: 1,133 |

| March 9 | Crown Legacy | 1–1 | Richmond Kickers | Matthews, North Carolina |
| 14:00 EST | | | | Stadium: Mecklenburg County Sportsplex; Attendance: 452 |

=== Midseason exhibitions ===
| June 26 | Richmond Kickers | 1–1 | Lionsbridge | Richmond, Virginia |
| 14:00 EST | Kirkland 53' | Report | Hall 31' (pen.) | Stadium: City Stadium |

== Competitions ==
=== USL League One ===
==== Table ====
| Pos | Team | Pld | W | L | T | GF | GA | GD | Pts | Qualification |
|---|---|---|---|---|---|---|---|---|---|---|
| 6 | (North Carolina) Charlotte Independence | 22 | 9 | 6 | 7 | 37 | 31 | +6 | 34 | Playoffs |
| 7 | (Washington (state)) Spokane Velocity FC | 22 | 7 | 9 | 6 | 26 | 35 | −9 | 27 | Playoffs |
| 8 | (Virginia) Richmond Kickers | 22 | 6 | 10 | 6 | 25 | 34 | −9 | 24 | Playoffs |
| 9 | (Kentucky) Lexington SC | 22 | 5 | 11 | 6 | 33 | 42 | −9 | 21 | |
| 10 | (Georgia (U.S. state)) South Georgia Tormenta FC | 22 | 4 | 10 | 8 | 33 | 42 | −9 | 20 | |

Source: USL League One
Rules for classification: 1) points; 2) total wins; 3) total goal differential; 4) total goals scored; 5) points earned against top four Conference finishers; 6) disciplinary points; 7) drawing of lots.

==== Results summary ====
| Overall | | | | | | | | Home | | | | | | Away | | | | | |
| Pld | W | D | L | GF | GA | GD | Pts | W | D | L | GF | GA | GD | W | D | L | GF | GA | GD |
|---|---|---|---|---|---|---|---|---|---|---|---|---|---|---|---|---|---|---|---|
| 5 | 1 | 1 | 3 | 7 | 11 | −4 | 4 | 1 | 0 | 2 | 4 | 7 | −3 | 0 | 1 | 1 | 3 | 4 | −1 |

Last updated: April 28, 2024.
Source: USL League One

==== Match results ====
| March 16 1 | Spokane Velocity | 2–1 | Richmond Kickers | Spokane, WA |
| 5:00 p.m. EDT | Métanire 4'; Longmire 15' | Report | Billhardt 20' | Stadium: One Spokane Stadium; Attendance: 5,086; Referee: Yannick Rothfuss |

| March 23 2 | Richmond Kickers | 1–3 | Tormenta | Richmond, VA |
| 5:00 p.m. EDT | | Report | | Stadium: City Stadium; Attendance: 4,523; Referee: Luis Arroyo |

| April 6 3 | Richmond Kickers | 3–2 | Central Valley Fuego | Richmond, VA |
| 6:00 p.m. EDT | | Report | | Stadium: City Stadium; Attendance: 3,551; Referee: Izlen Peksenar |

| April 13 4 | Forward Madison | 2–2 | Richmond Kickers | Madison, WI |
| 7:00 p.m. EDT | | Report | | Stadium: Breese Stevens Field; Attendance: 3,821; Referee: Alex Beehler |

| April 20 5 | Richmond Kickers | 0–2 | Spokane Velocity | Richmond, VA |
| 6:00 p.m. EDT | | Report | | Stadium: City Stadium; Attendance: 5,368; Referee: Stearne Briem |

| May 3 6 | Richmond Kickers | 1–1 | One Knoxville | Richmond, VA |
| 7:00 p.m. EDT | | Report | | Stadium: City Stadium; Attendance: 4,730; Referee: Wesley Costa |

| May 18 7 | Richmond Kickers | 0–1 | Greenville Triumph | Richmond, VA |
| 7:00 p.m. EDT | | Report | | Stadium: City Stadium; Attendance: 3,790; Referee: Rafael Santos |

| June 1 8 | One Knoxville | 1–2 | Richmond Kickers | Knoxville, TN |
| 7:00 p.m. EDT | | Report | | Stadium: Regal Stadium; Attendance: 1,788; Referee: Stearne Briem |

| June 15 9 | Central Valley Fuego | 1–1 | Richmond Kickers | Fresno, CA |
| 10:30 p.m. EDT | | Report | | Stadium: Fresno State Soccer Stadium; Attendance: 643; Referee: Rafael Bonilla |

| June 22 10 | Richmond Kickers | 0–2 | Northern Colorado Hailstorm | Richmond, VA |
| 7:00 p.m. EDT | | Report | | Stadium: City Stadium; Attendance: 3,647; Referee: DeShun Beard |

| July 3 11 | Richmond Kickers | 2–1 | Forward Madison | Richmond, VA |
| 8:00 p.m. EDT | | Report | | Stadium: City Stadium; Attendance: 5,574; Referee: Rafael Santos |

| July 13 12 | Chattanooga Red Wolves | 3–1 | Richmond Kickers | Chattanooga, TN |
| 7:30 p.m. EDT | | Report | | Stadium: CHI Memorial Stadium; Attendance: 2,107; Referee: Joe Surgan |

| July 27 13 | Lexington SC | 2–1 | Richmond Kickers | Georgetown, KY |
| 7:00 p.m. EDT | | Report | | Stadium: Toyota Stadium; Attendance: 1,143; Referee: Edson Carvajal |

| August 3 14 | Northern Colorado Hailstorm | 3–1 | Richmond Kickers | Windsor, CO |
| 9:00 p.m. EDT | | Report | | Stadium: 4Rivers Equipment Stadium; Attendance: 1,123; Referee: Michael Zapata |

| August 16 15 | Greenville Triumph | 1–1 | Richmond Kickers | Greenville, SC |
| 7:00 p.m. EDT | | Report | | Stadium: Paladin Stadium; Attendance: 1,251; Referee: Stearne Briem |

| August 24 16 | Union Omaha | 3–0 | Richmond Kickers | Papillion, NE |
| 7:00 p.m. EDT | | Report | | Stadium: Werner Park; Attendance: 3,752; Referee: Wesley Costa |

| September 14 17 | Charlotte Independence | 0–1 | Richmond Kickers | Charlotte, NC |
| 7:00 p.m. EDT | | Report | | Stadium: American Legion Memorial Stadium; Attendance: 1,404; Referee: Stearne Briem |

| September 21 18 | Richmond Kickers | 3–0 | Lexington SC | Richmond, VA |
| 6:00 p.m. EDT | | Report | | Stadium: City Stadium; Attendance: 5,067; Referee: Luis Arroyo |

| October 5 19 | Richmond Kickers | 0–0 | Union Omaha | Richmond, VA |
| 6:00 p.m. EDT | | Report | | Stadium: City Stadium; Attendance: 5,448; Referee: Atahan Yaya |

| October 11 20 | Tormenta | 2–2 | Richmond Kickers | Statesboro, GA |
| 7:30 p.m. EDT | | Report | | Stadium: Tormenta Stadium; Attendance: 944; Referee: Wesley Costa |

| October 19 21 | Richmond Kickers | 2–1 | Chattanooga Red Wolves | Richmond, VA |
| 6:00 p.m. EDT | | Report | | Stadium: City Stadium; Attendance: 4,303; Referee: Nickrod Fateh |

| October 26 22 | Richmond Kickers | 0–1 | Charlotte Independence | Richmond, VA |
| 6:00 p.m. EDT | | Report | | Stadium: City Stadium; Attendance: 5,386; Referee: John Matto |

=== USL-1 Playoffs ===
| November 3 Quarterfinals | Union Omaha | 1–0 | Richmond Kickers | Papillion, Nebraska |
| 15:30 EDT | Mastrantonio (yellow card) 24'; Kunga 51'; Gómez (yellow card) 60'; Schneider (yellow card) 69' | Report | Cela (yellow card) 26'; O'Dwyer (yellow card) 67' | Stadium: Werner Park; Attendance: 2,245; Referee: Jeremy Scheer |

=== U.S. Open Cup ===
| March 20 First round | Richmond Kickers (USL1) (Virginia) | 1–0 | (Maryland) Christos (MSSL) | Richmond, VA |
| 6:30 p.m. EDT | Billhardt 45+1' | Report | St. Martin (red card) 90' | Stadium: City Stadium; Attendance: 1,876; Referee: Brendan O'Neill |

| April 2 Second round | Richmond Kickers (USL1) (Virginia) | 5–2 | Maryland Bobcats (NISA) | Richmond, VA |
| 6:30 p.m. EDT | Vinyals 6' (pen.) (yellow card) 14'; O'Dwyer 20'; Barnathan 45+3', 88'; Sierakowski 83' | Report | Possain (yellow card) 12' (yellow-red card) 61'; Kooistra 24'; Gabarra (yellow card) 53'; Espinal 71'; Kao (yellow card) 77' | Stadium: City Stadium; Attendance: 2,219; Referee: David Elliott |

| April 17 Third round | Richmond Kickers (USL1) (Virginia) | 0–0 (4–5 p) | (Virginia) Loudoun United (USLC) | Richmond, VA |
| EDT | | | | Stadium: City Stadium; Attendance: 1,439 |
| | Penalties |
| | Vinyals (penalty scored); Billhardt (penalty scored); Barnathan (penalty scored); Vaughan (penalty scored); Bosua (penalty missed) | | Ryan (penalty scored); Tingey (penalty scored); Leerman (penalty scored); Aboukoura (penalty scored); Skundrich (penalty scored) |

=== Jägermeister Cup ===
==== Group stage ====
===== Table =====
| Pos | Team | Pld | W | PKW | PKL | L | GF | GA | GD | Pts | Qualification |
|---|---|---|---|---|---|---|---|---|---|---|---|
| 1 | Charlotte Independence | 8 | 3 | 1 | 3 | 1 | 11 | 9 | +2 | 14 | Advanced to knockout stage |
| 2 | Greenville Triumph SC | 8 | 3 | 1 | 1 | 3 | 10 | 8 | +2 | 12 | |
| 3 | Richmond Kickers | 8 | 2 | 3 | 0 | 3 | 9 | 11 | −2 | 12 | |
| 4 | South Georgia Tormenta FC | 8 | 0 | 2 | 2 | 4 | 8 | 13 | −5 | 6 | |

Source: USL League One
Rules for classification: 1) points; 2) goals for in cup match play (only for determining wild card); 3) head-to-head points earned in small group play; 4) total wins in small group play; 5) total wins in all cup matches; 6) goals for in small group play; 7) goals for in cup match play; 8) goals assisted in cup match play; 9) goal differential in cup match play; 10) disciplinary points; 11) coin toss.

===== Results =====
| April 27 1 | Greenville Triumph | 1–1 (a.e.t.) (3–5 p) | Richmond Kickers | Greenville, SC |
| 7:00 p.m. EDT | Polak (yellow card) 24'; Herrera (yellow card) 32'; Lee (89) | Report | Vinyals (penalty missed) 20', (yellow card) 55'; Schenfeld (yellow card) 32'; Sierakowski (70); França (yellow card) 77'; Vaughan (yellow card) 78'; O'Dwyer (yellow card) 90+3' | Stadium: Paladin Stadium; Attendance: 4,041; Referee: Jonathan Bilinski |
| | Penalties |
| | Smith (penalty scored); MacKinnon (penalty scored); Zakowski (penalty missed); Polak (penalty scored) | | (penalty scored) Vinyals; (penalty scored) Fitch; (penalty scored) Gomiero; (penalty scored) Morán; (penalty scored) O'Dwyer |

| May 11 2 | Chattanooga Red Wolves | 1–0 | Richmond Kickers | East Ridge, TN |
| 7:00 p.m. EDT | | Report | | Stadium: CHI Memorial Stadium; Attendance: 2,467; Referee: Aleksandar Zhelyazkov |

| May 25 3 | Tormenta | 1–2 | Richmond Kickers | Statesboro, GA |
| 7:30 p.m. EDT | | Report | | Stadium: Tormenta Stadium; Attendance: 1,721; Referee: Mario Maric |

| June 8 4 | Richmond Kickers | 0–1 | Charlotte Independence | Richmond, VA |
| 4:00 p.m. EDT | | Report | | Stadium: City Stadium; Attendance: 4,156; Referee: Amin Hadzic |

| June 29 5 | Charlotte Independence | 2–2 (a.e.t.) (4–5 p) | Richmond Kickers | Charlotte, NC |
| 7:30 p.m. EDT | | Report | | Stadium: American Legion Memorial Stadium; Attendance: 821; Referee: Olvin Oliva |

| July 20 6 | Richmond Kickers | 0–2 | Greenville Triumph | Richmond, VA |
| 7:00 p.m. EDT | | Report | | Stadium: City Stadium; Attendance: 4,384; Referee: Josiah Parke |

| August 10 7 | Richmond Kickers | 1–1 (6–5 p) | Tormenta | Richmond, VA |
| 7:00 p.m. EDT | | Report | | Stadium: City Stadium; Attendance: 4,221; Referee: Erick Lezama |

| August 29 8 | Richmond Kickers | 3–2 | Spokane Velocity | Richmond, VA |
| 7:00 p.m. EDT | | Report | | Stadium: City Stadium; Attendance: 3,579; Referee: Rafael Santos |

== Statistics ==
=== Appearances and goals ===
As of October 20, 2024. Numbers after plus–sign (+) denote appearances as a substitute.

| No. | Pos | Nat | Player | Total | | USL1 | | USL1 Playoffs | | U.S. Open Cup | | Jägermeister Cup | |
| No. | Pos | Nat | Player | Apps | Goals | Apps | Goals | Apps | Goals | Apps | Goals | Apps | Goals |
|---|---|---|---|---|---|---|---|---|---|---|---|---|---|
| 1 | GK | (Chile) CHI | Pablo Jara | 16 | 0 | 11+0 | 0 | 0+0 | 0 | 2+0 | 0 | 3+0 | 0 |
| 2 | DF | (United States) USA | Dakota Barnathan | 30 | 2 | 19+2 | 0 | 0+0 | 0 | 3+0 | 2 | 6+0 | 0 |
| 3 | DF | (United States) USA | Chris Cole | 11 | 0 | 1+3 | 0 | 0+0 | 0 | 2+1 | 0 | 3+1 | 0 |
| 4 | DF | (United States) USA | Simon Fitch | 32 | 1 | 22+0 | 1 | 0+0 | 0 | 3+0 | 0 | 7+0 | 0 |
| 5 | MF | (Chile) CHI | Maxi Schenfeld | 31 | 1 | 19+2 | 1 | 0+0 | 0 | 2+0 | 0 | 6+2 | 0 |
| 6 | MF | (Argentina) ARG | Zacarías Morán | 29 | 0 | 17+4 | 0 | 0+0 | 0 | 1+1 | 0 | 6+0 | 0 |
| 7 | FW | (United States) USA | Landon Johnson | 2 | 0 | 0+0 | 0 | 0+0 | 0 | 0+0 | 0 | 0+2 | 0 |
| 8 | FW | (Brazil) BRA | João Gomiero | 19 | 2 | 4+10 | 2 | 0+0 | 0 | 0+0 | 0 | 0+5 | 0 |
| 9 | FW | (South Africa) RSA | Arthur Bosua | 18 | 0 | 5+7 | 0 | 0+0 | 0 | 2+1 | 0 | 1+2 | 0 |
| 10 | MF | (Spain) ESP | Nil Vinyals | 31 | 5 | 16+6 | 2 | 0+0 | 0 | 2+1 | 1 | 6+0 | 2 |
| 11 | FW | (United States) USA | Ryan Sierakowski | 29 | 3 | 14+5 | 1 | 0+0 | 0 | 1+2 | 1 | 4+3 | 1 |
| 13 | GK | (United States) USA | Ryan Shellow | 9 | 0 | 5+0 | 0 | 0+0 | 0 | 1+0 | 0 | 3+0 | 0 |
| 14 | DF | (Brazil) BRA | Guilherme França | 19 | 1 | 7+5 | 1 | 0+0 | 0 | 0+0 | 0 | 4+3 | 0 |
| 15 | DF | (United States) USA | Toni Pineda | 18 | 0 | 3+9 | 0 | 0+0 | 0 | 0+1 | 0 | 1+4 | 0 |
| 16 | DF | (Canada) CAN | Klaidi Cela | 6 | 1 | 5+1 | 1 | 0+0 | 0 | 0+0 | 0 | 0+0 | 0 |
| 17 | MF | (England) ENG | James Vaughan | 29 | 0 | 13+6 | 0 | 0+0 | 0 | 0+3 | 0 | 7+0 | 0 |
| 19 | FW | (United States) USA | Justin Sukow | 17 | 1 | 6+3 | 0 | 0+0 | 0 | 3+0 | 0 | 3+2 | 1 |
| 20 | MF | (Germany) GER | Adrian Billhardt | 27 | 8 | 15+2 | 5 | 0+0 | 0 | 2+1 | 1 | 6+1 | 2 |
| 24 | DF | (United States) USA | Nathan Aune | 14 | 0 | 5+4 | 0 | 0+0 | 0 | 0+0 | 0 | 1+4 | 0 |
| 27 | MF | (England) ENG | Chandler O'Dwyer | 32 | 9 | 17+5 | 6 | 0+0 | 0 | 3+0 | 1 | 6+1 | 2 |
| 29 | GK | (United States) USA | Will Palmquist | 0 | 0 | 0+0 | 0 | 0+0 | 0 | 0+0 | 0 | 0+0 | 0 |
| 30 | GK | (United States) USA | Eli Mumford | 0 | 0 | 0+0 | 0 | 0+0 | 0 | 0+0 | 0 | 0+0 | 0 |
| 32 | FW | (Argentina) ARG | Emiliano Terzaghi | 17 | 3 | 8+5 | 3 | 0+0 | 0 | 0+0 | 0 | 2+2 | 0 |
| 33 | MF | (United States) USA | Gabe Cox | 4 | 0 | 0+2 | 0 | 0+0 | 0 | 0+0 | 0 | 0+2 | 0 |
| 34 | DF | (United States) USA | Beckett Howell | 3 | 0 | 0+1 | 0 | 0+0 | 0 | 0+2 | 0 | 0+0 | 0 |
| 35 | GK | (United States) USA | James Sneddon | 7 | 0 | 6+0 | 0 | 0+0 | 0 | 0+0 | 0 | 1+0 | 0 |
| 36 | MF | (United States) USA | Landon Johnson | 3 | 0 | 0+1 | 0 | 0+0 | 0 | 0+2 | 0 | 0+0 | 0 |
| 37 | MF | (Jamaica) JAM | Nicholas Simmonds | 8 | 0 | 3+2 | 0 | 0+0 | 0 | 1+1 | 0 | 0+1 | 0 |
| 38 | MF | (United States) USA | Griffin Garnett | 31 | 0 | 19+1 | 0 | 0+0 | 0 | 3+0 | 0 | 7+1 | 0 |
| 39 | DF | (United States) USA | Noah Hiort-Wright | 0 | 0 | 0+0 | 0 | 0+0 | 0 | 0+0 | 0 | 0+0 | 0 |
| 45 | FW | (United States) USA | Joshua Kirkland | 5 | 0 | 2+3 | 0 | 0+0 | 0 | 0+0 | 0 | 0+0 | 0 |
