= Adrian Billhardt =

German footballer (born 1997)

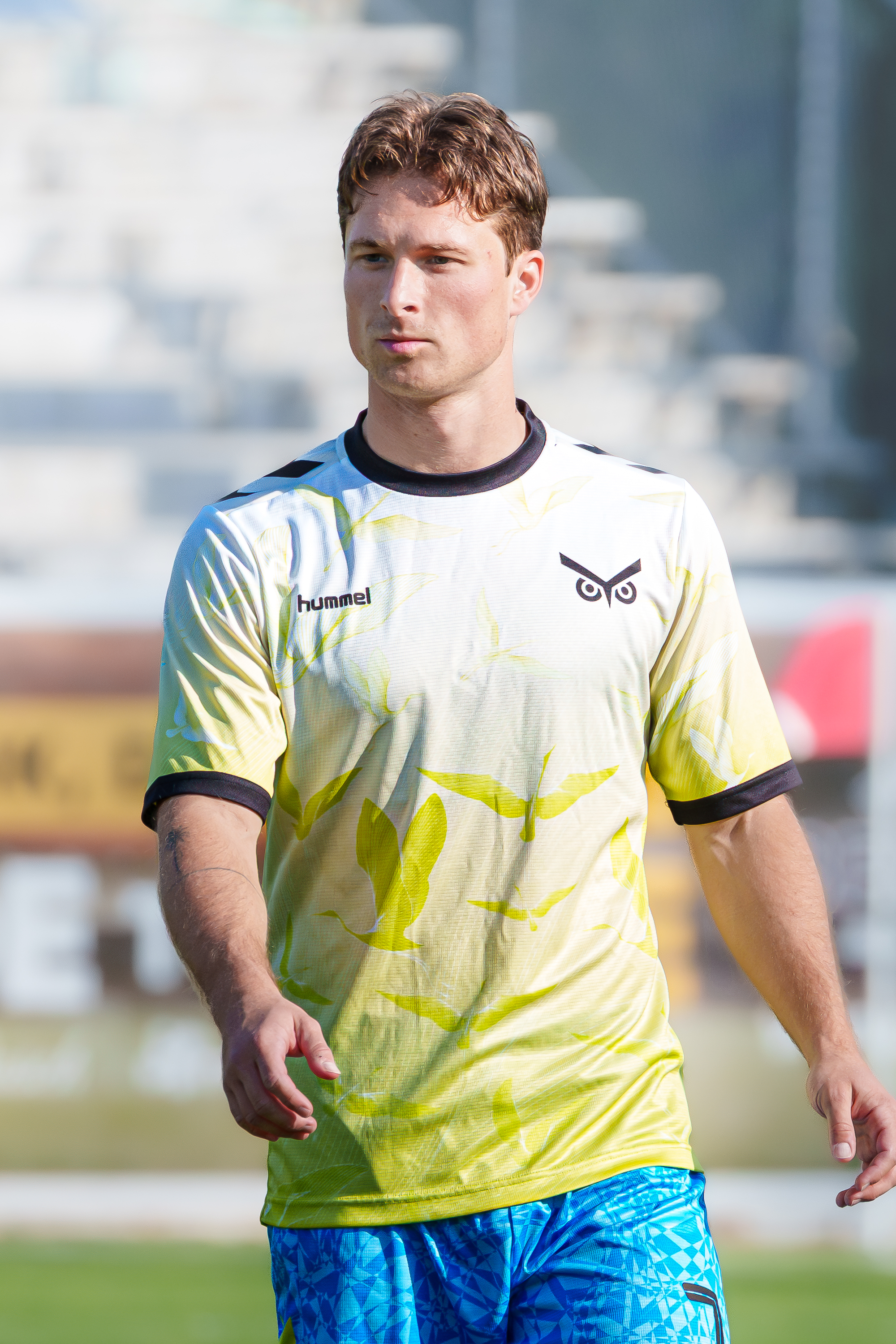
- Billhardt with Union Omaha in 2026

Personal information
- Date of birth: 17 October 1997 (age 29)
- Place of birth: Berlin, Germany
- Height: 1.75 m (5 ft 9 in)
- Position: Midfielder

Team information
- Current team: Union Omaha
- Number: 7

Youth career
- –2012: BFC Dynamo
- 2012–2016: Union Berlin

College career
Years	Team	Apps	(Gls)
2017–2019	SF Bulls	49	(11)

Senior career*
Years	Team	Apps	(Gls)
2016–2017	BFC Dynamo II	12	(2)
2016–2017	BFC Dynamo	8	(0)
2019	Tormenta FC 2	15	(11)
2021–2022	Tormenta FC	37	(5)
2023	Detroit City FC	13	(0)
2024–2025	Richmond Kickers	39	(8)
2026–	Union Omaha	6	(1)
- * Club domestic league appearances and goals as of 20 April 2026

Adrian Billhardt (born 17 October 1997) is a German professional footballer that plays as a midfielder for Union Omaha in USL League One.

== Early life and youth career ==
Adrian Billhardt was born on 17 October 1997 in Berlin, Germany. He started his career playing for German club Berliner FC Dynamo. In 2012, he joined Union Berlin's youth academy. He left in 2016. He was also invited to the U17 Germany national team camp.

Billhardt played college soccer for the South Florida Bulls. He played a total of 49 games and scored 11 goals, across two seasons.

== Professional career ==
On 27 July 2016, he re-signed for his former youth club, BFC Dynamo. He debuted for the club in a 5–0 win against FSV Union Fürstenwalde on 31 July. He scored his first goal for the club although, he was playing for the BFC Dynamo II team, and he scored in a 6–1 loss against Tasmania Berlin away from home on 18 March 2017.

He then scored again 2–1 victory over 1. FC Wilmersdorf. He played a total of 20 games and 2 goals playing for the main and reserve sides.

=== Tormenta FC 2 ===
On 1 May 2019, while still in college Billhardt signed a contract to join Tormenta FC 2 in USL League Two, which is the reserve side of Tormenta FC. He played all the matches and scored 11 goals in USL League Two. He was named to the USL League Two All-League Team of the Year, as well as the All-Southern Conference Team.

Although the 2020 season was cancelled due to the pandemic, Billhardt was invited to train with the team.

=== Tormenta FC ===
==== 2021 ====
On 1 February 2021, Billhardt joined the main Tormenta FC in USL League One. Billhardt made his team debut in a 1–0 loss to Fort Lauderdale CF. On 1 May 2021, he recorded is first assist on a goal by Curtis Thorn in a 3–1 win against FC Tucson. On 8 May 2021, he suffered a season-ending injury versus the Richmond Kickers. In the season he made five appearances.

==== 2022 ====
On 2 April 2022, he made his first appearance in the 2022 season in the opening match, a 1–0 home loss to North Carolina FC. On 30 April, he scored his first goal for the club in a 2–0 win over FC Tucson. He scored in 2–2 draw against Richmond Kickers. On 3 June, he assisted a goal for Kingsford Adjei in a 1–1 draw against Northern Colorado Hailstorm FC. He also provided an assist for Jake Dengler in a 2–2 draw against Forward Madison FC.

On 24 June, he scored in a 2–3 home loss to Union Omaha. On 12 July, he provided a goal and assist in a 5–5 draw against Greenville Triumph. He assisted a goal for in a 2–1 loss against Chattanooga Red Wolves. On 6 September 2022, he scored the only goal for Tormenta in a 3–1 loss to the Richmond Kickers. He later appeared three times in the playoffs including the final and won his first trophy for the club. In the 2022 season, he made 17 appearances and scored 5 goals.

=== Detroit City FC ===
On 19 January 2023, Billhardt joined USL Championship club Detroit City FC. He made his debut in a 3–1 win against El Paso Locomotive. He provided his only assist of the season in a 1–0 win against Gold Star FC in the U.S. Open Cup. He made a total of 13 appearances with zero goals.

=== Richmond Kickers ===
==== 2024 ====
On 20 February 2024, Billhardt signed for USL League One club Richmond Kickers. On 16 March, he made his debut and including his first goal in a 2–1 loss against expansion club, Spokane Velocity. He then scored in a 3–2 win over Central Valley Fuego. He scored in a 2–2 draw against Forward Madison FC. On 3 May 2024, he scored in a 1–1 draw against One Knoxville SC. He would score in a 2–1 loss against Lexington SC.

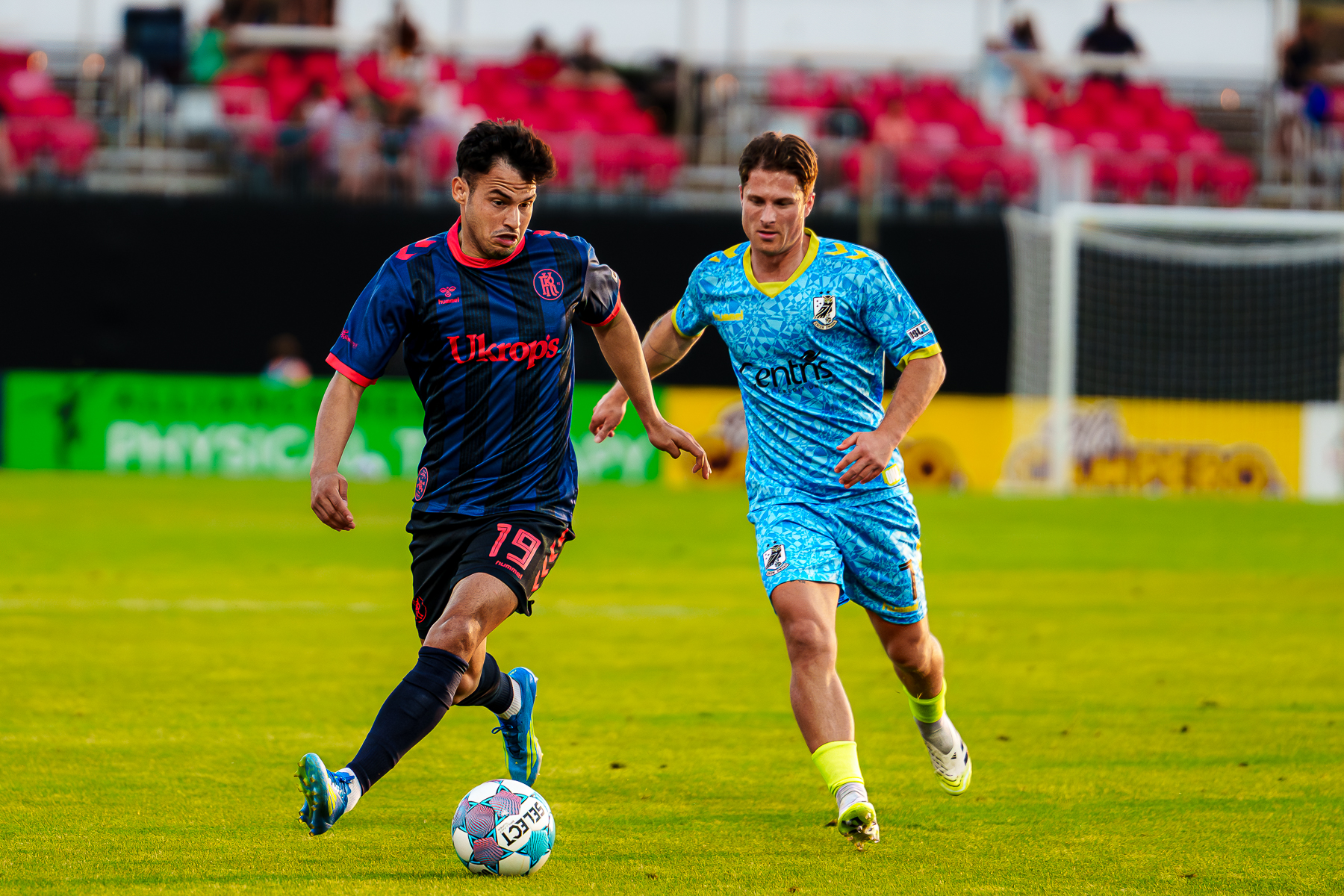
Billhardt playing against Richmond Kickers player, Darwin Espinal. Billhardt used to play for the Kickers with Espinal in the 2025 season.

==== 2025 ====
On 15 March 2025, he made his first appearance of the 2025 season in a 1–0 loss against Charlotte Independence. On 25 June 2025, he scored his first goal of the season in a 3–4 win over Union Omaha. On 20 September, he provided an assist to Darwin Espinal in a 2–3 loss against Charlotte Independence.

On 4 October, he scored a goal against One Knoxville SC, and the game resulted in a 2–1 victory. On 25 October 2025, he made his final appearance for the Kickers against Forward Madison FC, during the match he scored a goal and assisted two goals for Emiliano Terzaghi and Marcelo Lage, he was subbed out for Hayden Anderson and the match ended 5–1. He departed from the Kickers after scoring 8 goals in 39 appearances across his two seasons with the Kickers.

=== Union Omaha ===
On 15 December 2025, Billhardt joined Union Omaha in USL League One. He made his debut for The Owls in a 1–0 loss against Spokane Velocity. Billhardt scored his first goal for Union Omaha in a 3–1 away win against AV Alta FC.

== Honours ==
Tormenta FC

- USL League One: 2022
