= Joshua Kirkland =

American soccer player (born 2001)

Josh Kirkland
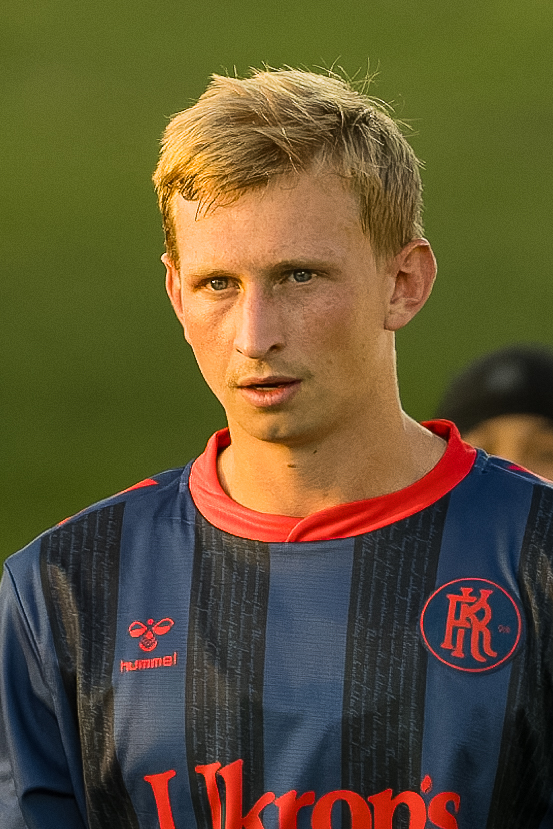
- Kirkland with the Richmond Kickers in 2026

Personal information
- Full name: Joshua Edward Kirkland
- Date of birth: 14 March 2001 (age 25)
- Place of birth: Glen Allen, Virginia, United States
- Height: 1.85 m (6 ft 1 in)
- Position: Forward

Team information
- Current team: Richmond Kickers
- Number: 9

Youth career
- Deep Run High School
- –2019: Richmond Strikers

College career
Years	Team	Apps	(Gls)
2019–2024	Mary Washington Eagles	80	(47)
2023–2024	→ Charlottesville Blues (loan)	12	(4)

Senior career*
Years	Team	Apps	(Gls)
2024–	Richmond Kickers	58	(14)
- * Club domestic league appearances and goals as of November 2, 2026

Joshua Edward Kirkland (born 14 March 2001) is an American soccer player that plays as a forward for USL League One club Richmond Kickers.

== Early life and youth career ==
Josh Kirkland was born in Glen Allen, Virginia on 14 March 2001. He played in college for the Mary Washington Eagles. He would represent the Richmond Strikers, and Charlottesville Blues on loan.

== Career ==
In September 2024 he signed for his first professional club signing for the Richmond Kickers in USL League One. He would make six appearances in the 2024 season.

=== 2025 ===
He would make his debut in the 2025 season coming on as a substitute in a 4–2 win against South Georgia Tormenta. He would score his first two goals for the Kickers in a 4–4 draw against newly formed club, Westchester.

On 2 May, he would score another brace in a 3–3 draw against Greenville Triumph. On 2 June 2025, he would score in a 1–2 loss against Texoma FC, another expansion club.

On 25 June 2025, he would score two goals to help the Kickers win 3–4 against Union Omaha. His final goal of the season came in a 4–2 loss against South Georgia Tormenta.

He ended the 2025 season with 29 appearances and scoring eight goals finishing and led second for top-scorer of their season only behind Darwin Espinal who scored nine.

=== 2026 ===
He scored his first goal of the 2026 season in the 9th minute in a 1–1 draw against AV Alta, the Kickers' first game of their USL League One regular season.
