= Klaidi Cela =

Canadian soccer player (born 1999)

- Cela with Toronto FC II in 2022

Personal information
- Full name: Klaidi Çela
- Date of birth: July 16, 1999 (age 27)
- Place of birth: Mississauga, Ontario, Canada
- Height: 1.90 m (6 ft 3 in)
- Position: Defender

Youth career
- Mississauga Falcons
- 2012–2016: Toronto FC
- 2017–2018: Gafanha

Senior career*
Years	Team	Apps	(Gls)
2015–2016	Toronto FC III	23+	(0)
2015	Toronto FC II	1	(0)
2017–2018	Gafanha B		
2018	Sigma FC	1	(0)
2019–2020	Forge FC	10	(1)
2021	Sigma FC	4	(1)
2021	→ Forge FC (loan)	1	(0)
2021	Forge FC	4	(0)
2022	Toronto FC II	4	(0)
2023	Vaughan Azzurri	2	(0)
2023	Valour FC	23	(2)
2024	Liria Prizren	12	(0)
2024–2025	Richmond Kickers	24	(2)
2026	KF Skënderbeu	5	(0)

International career^{‡}
2015	Canada U18	2	(0)
- * Club domestic league appearances and goals as of May 20, 2026 ‡ National team caps and goals as of November 23, 2024

Klaidi Çela (born July 16, 1999) is a Canadian soccer player who plays as a defender.

== Early life ==
Cela began playing youth soccer at age four with Mississauga Falcons SC. In October 2012, he joined the Toronto FC Academy.

== Club career ==
In 2015, he began playing with Toronto FC III in League1 Ontario. He also played with them in 2016 in both League1 Ontario and the Premier Development League.

In May 2015, Cela joined Toronto FC II in the USL Championship, signing an academy player agreement. He made his debut on September 24, 2015 in a substitute appearance against the Rochester Rhinos.

In 2016, Cela signed with Campeonato de Portugal club Gafanha, where he would spend two seasons.

In 2018, after leaving Gafanha, Cela returned to Canada and spent the remainder of the 2018 season with Sigma FC in League1 Ontario.

In April 2019, Cela signed with Canadian Premier League side Forge FC. He scored his first goal on October 2, 2019, in a 1-0 victory over FC Edmonton. He won the league title with the club in 2019 as well. In January 2020, he re-signed with the club for an additional season. On August 19, 2020, Cela tore his ACL in a match against the HFX Wanderers, causing him to miss the remainder of the season. Forge won the CPL title again in 2020, with Cela departing after the season.

In 2021, he returned to Sigma FC of League1 Ontario. In August 2021, he returned to Forge on a short term emergency loan deal. Cela rejoined Forge for a single game in September, and was eventually signed in October by Forge for the remainder of the 2021 Canadian Premier League season.

In March 2022, Cela signed with MLS Next Pro side Toronto FC II.

In 2023, he began the season with League1 Ontario side Vaughan Azzurri. With Vaughan, he played in the 2023 Canadian Championship against Major League Soccer club CF Montréal.

In April 2023, Cela signed with Canadian Premier League club Valour FC, following injuries occurred to Matthew Chandler and Andrew Jean-Baptiste.

In February 2024, Cela signed with Liria Prizren in the Football Superleague of Kosovo.

In August 2024, Cela signed with the Richmond Kickers in USL League One. He left the Kickers at the end of the 2025 season.

In early 2026, Cela joined Albanian club KF Skënderbeu in the Kategoria e Parë.

== International career ==
Due to Cela's parents being born in Albania, he is eligible to represent both Canada and Albania. In 2013, he made his debut in the Canadian national team program, attending a Canada U15 camp in November 2013, also attending another camp in September 2014.

In October 2015, he was called up to the Canada U18 team for a pair of friendlies against the United States U18, playing in both matches.
