= James Sneddon (soccer) =

American soccer player (born 2005)

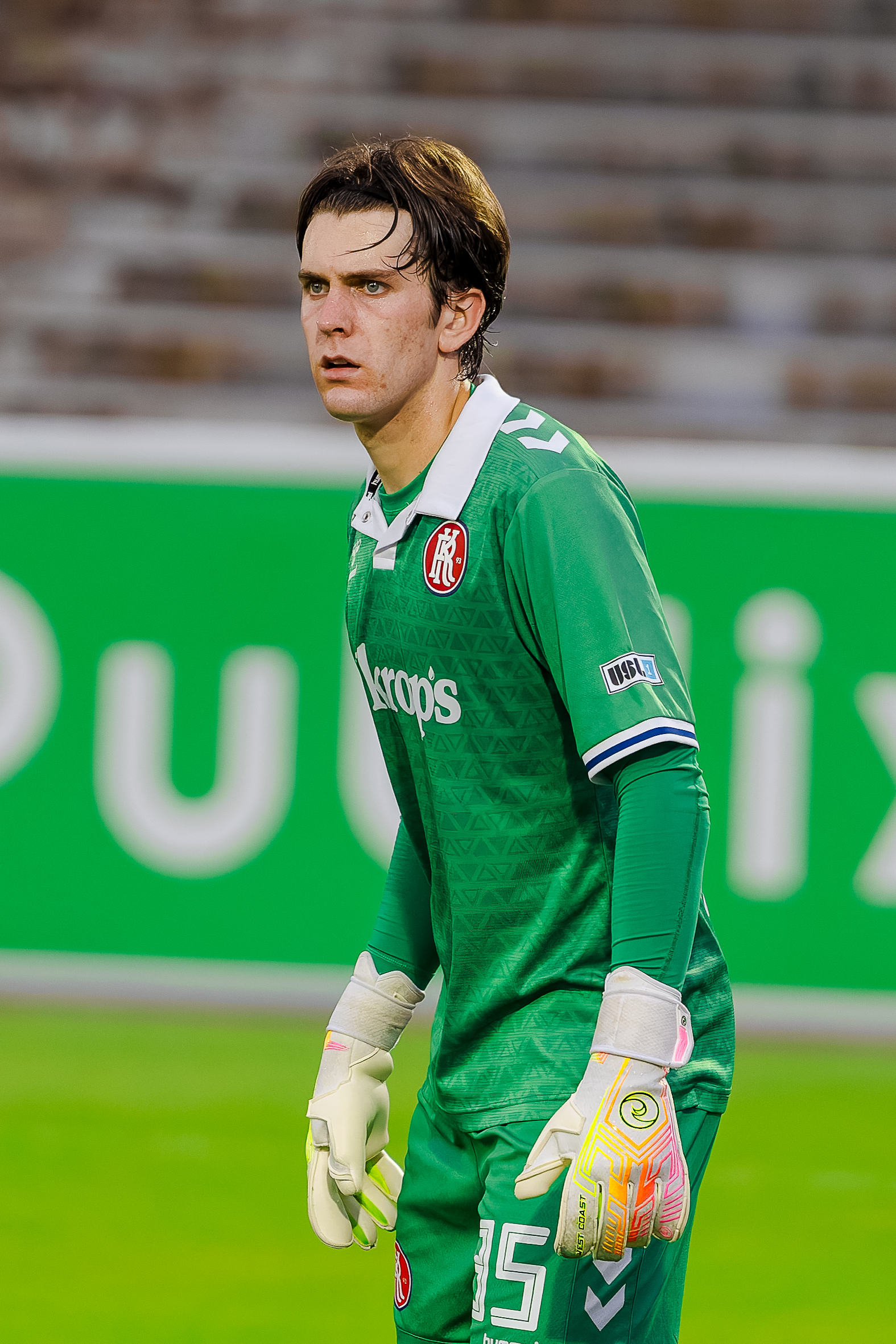
- Sneddon in 2026

Personal information
- Date of birth: November 28, 2005 (age 20)
- Place of birth: Richmond, Virginia, United States
- Height: 1.83 m (6 ft 0 in)
- Position: Goalkeeper

Team information
- Current team: Richmond Kickers
- Number: 35

Youth career
- 2018–2023: Richmond United

Senior career*
Years	Team	Apps	(Gls)
2023–	Richmond Kickers	36	(0)
- * Club domestic league appearances and goals as of November 2, 2026

James Sneddon (born November 28, 2005) is an American professional soccer player who plays as goalkeeper for the Richmond Kickers in USL League One.

== Early life and career ==
Sneddon was born on November 28, 2005. As a child he enjoyed kicking a ball with his brother in their backyard. Sneddon joined local soccer teams while at elementary school before signing for Richmond United.

In 2017, when he was 11-years old, Marcel DeBellis threw his gloves at Sneddon who was in the stands. Sneddon called it "The coolest thing ever." Sneddon started in the U13 of the Richmond United academy and competed in the U.S. Soccer Development Academy in 2017.

== Career ==
On June 20, 2023, Sneddon signed a USL Amademy Contract to join the Richmond Kickers. He did not make any appearance that season.

In 2024 Sneddon earned a Golden Glove and All-Tournament honors during the USL Academy League Finals Tournament in Tampa, Florida.

On March 13, 2024, Sneddon signed another USL Academy Contract with the club. On August 29, 2024, he made his professional debut for the Kickers in a 3–2 win against Spokane Velocity in the Jagermeister Cup where he stopped two goals in stoppage time.

Sneddon made his USL League One debut in a 1–0 win against Charlotte Independence keeping his first ever clean sheet on September 14. He then started in his third straight game in a row in a 3–0 win against Lexington SC. He then made his fourth straight appearance in a 0–0 draw against Union Omaha.

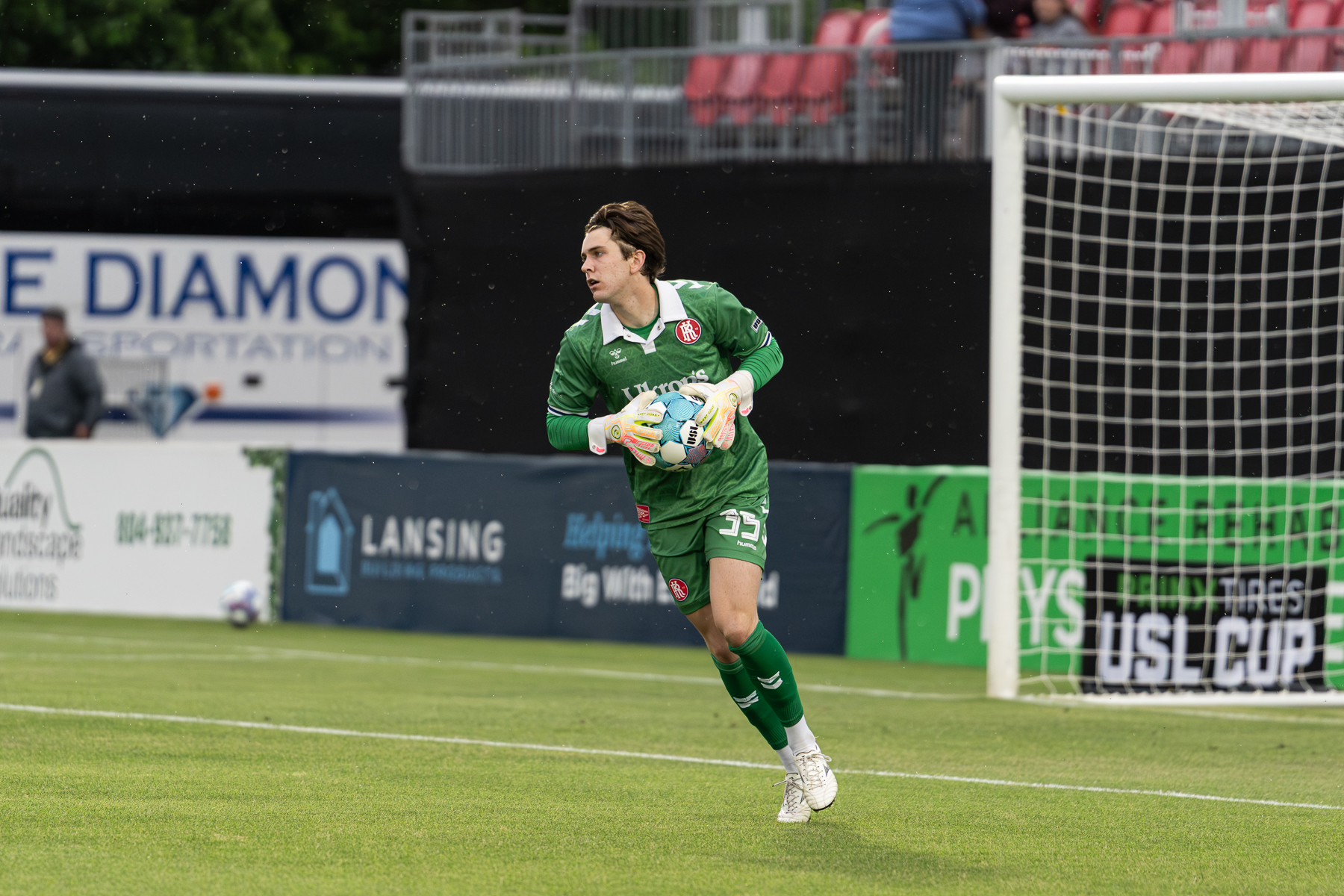
Sneddon with the Kickers in a game against Charlotte Independence in the USL Cup, his first game of the 2026 season

After getting another clean sheet he tied the USL League One record for consecutive clean sheets in his first three starts after making his league-competition debut on September 14. In the 2024 season he made 7 appearances with 6 appearances in USL League One.

On January 27, 2025, Sneddon signed his first ever professional contract with the Richmond Kickers for the 2025 season. He became a regular in Darren Sawatzky squad and played in nearly all the USL League One games, and Pablo Jara went to second-choice goalkeeper and only plays cup matches. He made his debut in the 2025 season in a 4–2 win against Tormenta. That season he made 27 league appearances.

In the 2026 season, he was demoted to second-choice goalkeeper after the singing of Yann Fillion. He made his first appearance in the 2026 season, in a 2–1 win against Charlotte Independence in the USL Cup.
