= Jefferson Cup =

Youth soccer tournament in Richmond, Virginia

The Jefferson Cup is a youth soccer tournament held annually since 1981 in Richmond, Virginia. hosted by the Richmond Strikers soccer club. The girls side is the No. 1 ranked youth soccer tournament in the United States, according to GotSoccer.com, while the boys side ranks 31st.

About 800 boys and girls teams are typically accepted to attend the Jefferson Cup, and some 500 teams are declined admission to the tournament every year. Age groups run from Under 11 to Under 18. In 2014, 461 girls teams were accepted, as well as 401 boys teams.

Beginning in 2015, it was played over a span of three weekends in March, rather than two weekends as in years past. It includes one boys weekend, two girls weekends, and a goalkeeper showcase.

Beginning in 2016, the Jefferson Cup will add a second showcase weekend for boys (Under 15 to Under 17) over Memorial Day Weekend.

A 2013 study showed that the event has an economic impact of $15 million annually on the local economy of greater Richmond, including drawing more than 22,000 hotel room nights to the area.

== College recruiting ==
The Jefferson Cup is a college showcase tournament. It had more than 400 college coaches attend the event in 2014.

In 2014, some of the 200+ men's college programs in attendance included: Brown University, College of William and Mary, Columbia University, George Mason University, George Washington University, Harvard University, James Madison University, North Carolina State University, Northwestern University, Old Dominion University, Rutgers University, Stanford University, Syracuse University, Temple University, Coast Guard Academy, Naval Academy, University of Kentucky, University of South Carolina, University of Virginia, Virginia Commonwealth University, Virginia Military Institute and Xavier University.

The 200+ women's college programs who registered to scout the Jefferson Cup in 2014 included: Boston University, Brown University, Coastal Carolina University, College of Charleston, College of the Holy Cross, College of William and Mary, Columbia University, Cornell University, Dartmouth College, Drexel University, Fordham University, George Mason University, George Washington University, Georgetown University, Harvard University, James Madison University, La Salle University, Marshall University, North Carolina State University, Old Dominion University, Rutgers University, Saint Joseph's University, Syracuse University, Temple University, U.S. Military Academy - West Point, U.S. Naval Academy, University of Alabama, University of Cincinnati, University of Dayton, University of Delaware, University of Louisville, University of Kentucky, University of Maryland, University of Miami (Fla.), University of Missouri, University of Pennsylvania, University of South Carolina, University of Virginia, Virginia Commonwealth University, Virginia Military Institute, Virginia Tech, Wake Forest University and Yale University.

== Playing format ==
Each age group contains between four and nine divisions based on level of play. Groups run from age U10 to U18. The top playing level in every group is the Championship division, and in descending order also includes Elite, Superior, Platinum, Classic, and Premier. U11 and U12 age groups include 8v8 as well as the standard 11v11 competition. The girls side also features a separate Elite Clubs National League (ECNL) bracket.

== Sponsorships ==
Jefferson Cup Strategic Partners include: Nike, Gatorade, US Club Soccer, and Richmond Strikers Soccer Club.

Other tournament partners include: Markel Corporation, Richmond SportsBackers, Richmond Metropolitan Convention and Visitors Bureau, Kwikgoal, FireHouse Subs, Richmond.com and VCU Center for Sports Leadership.
