= Griffin Garnett =

American soccer player (born 2006)

Personal information
- Date of birth: August 23, 2006 (age 20)
- Place of birth: Richmond, Virginia, United States
- Height: 1.91 m (6 ft 3 in)
- Position: Defender

Team information
- Current team: Ferencváros II
- Number: 15

Youth career
- –2023: Richmond Kickers

Senior career*
Years	Team	Apps	(Gls)
2024–2025	Richmond Kickers	41	(0)
2026–	Ferencváros II	8	(0)
- * Club domestic league appearances and goals as of July 3, 2026

Griffin Garnett (born August 23, 2006) is an American professional soccer player who plays as a defender for Ferencváros II.

== Early life ==
Garnett was born on August 23, 2006. Born in Richmond, Virginia, United States, he is a native of the city. The son of Scott and Stephanie, he started playing soccer at the age of three with Soccer Shots in Richmond, Virginia.

== Career ==
As a youth player, Garnett joined the youth academy of American side Richmond Kickers and was promoted to the club's senior team ahead of the 2024 season, where he made forty-one league appearances and scored zero goals. American news website WRIC-TV wrote in 2026 that "he was a stalwart in the backline for the Kickers" while playing for the club. Following his stint there, he signed for Hungarian side Ferencváros II in 2026.
