= Chris Cole (soccer) =

American soccer player

Personal information
- Full name: Christopher Cole
- Date of birth: February 3, 1996 (age 30)
- Place of birth: Elizabethtown, North Carolina, United States
- Height: 6 ft 1 in (1.85 m)
- Position: Defender

Youth career
- –2014: Eastside FC Premier

College career
Years	Team	Apps	(Gls)
2014	Lenoir–Rhyne Bears	5	(1)
2015	Bellevue College Bulldogs		
2016–2018	Seattle Pacific Falcons	18	(1)

Senior career*
Years	Team	Apps	(Gls)
2019	Seattle Sounders FC U-23	0	(0)
2021–2024	Richmond Kickers	46	(1)
- * Club domestic league appearances and goals as of November 23, 2024

Christopher Cole (born February 3, 1996) is an American professional soccer player who plays as a defender. He is currently a free agent.

== Career ==
=== Youth, college and amateur ===
Cole played as part of the Eastside FC Premier academy, before heading to play college soccer at Lenoir–Rhyne University in 2014. After his freshman season, he transferred to Bellevue College, and then spent three years at Seattle Pacific University.

In 2019, Cole also spent time with USL League Two side Seattle Sounders FC U-23.

=== Professional ===
In March 2021, Cole was invited to trial with USL League One side Richmond Kickers during their pre-season. He earned his first professional contract with the Kickers on April 29, 2021. He made his debut on May 2, 2021, appearing as a 68th-minute substitute during a 2–1 loss to Fort Lauderdale CF.On 9 December 2024, the Richmond Kickers did not renew his contract and he left club.
