= Gui França =

Brazilian footballer (born 1999)

Personal information
- Full name: Guilherme Diniz França
- Date of birth: 8 July 1999 (age 27)
- Place of birth: Rio de Janeiro, Brazil
- Height: 1.88 m (6 ft 2 in)
- Position: Centre-back

Team information
- Current team: Sampaio Corrêa

College career
Years	Team	Apps	(Gls)
2019–2020	Cloud County Thunderbirds	6	(1)
2020–2023	Dalton State Roadrunners	59	(12)

Senior career*
Years	Team	Apps	(Gls)
2022	Dalton Red Wolves	11	(0)
2024–2025	Richmond Kickers	28	(1)
2026–	Sampaio Corrêa		
- * Club domestic league appearances and goals as of 17:44, 6 April 2026 (UTC)

Guilherme Diniz França (born 8 July 1999), known for short as Guilherme França or Gui França is a Brazilian professional footballer who plays as a centre-back for Campeonato Brasileiro Série D club Sampaio Corrêa.

== Early life ==
França was born in Rio de Janeiro, and attended Colégio pH in his hometown during his youth.

== Career ==
=== College ===
França started his career with Cloud County Thunderbirds, and would transfer to the Dalton State Roadrunners in 2020. He was sent on loan to USL League Two side Dalton Red Wolves for the 2022 season, before returning and becoming a regular starter for the Roadrunners.

=== Richmond Kickers ===
On 4 January 2024, França signed for USL League One club Richmond Kickers on a two-year contract. On May 3, França made his debut for the Kickers in a 1–1 draw against One Knoxville. He played his first full game 1–0 loss against Greenville Triumph. On June 15, França scored his first goal for the club in a 1–1 draw against Central Valley Fuego. França would finish the 2024 season scoring 1 goal in 12 appearances.

On 15 March 2025, França played his first game of the 2025 season in a 1–0 loss against Charlotte Independence. He managed to get three yellow cards in a row in the games against Union Omaha and newly formed clubs Westchester and FC Naples, and finished the season with 16 appearances. In November, he left as his contract expired.

=== Sampaio Corrêa ===
On 20 November 2025, França agreed to join Campeonato Brasileiro Série D club Sampaio Corrêa for the upcoming season.
