= Chandler O'Dwyer =

English footballer (born 1998)

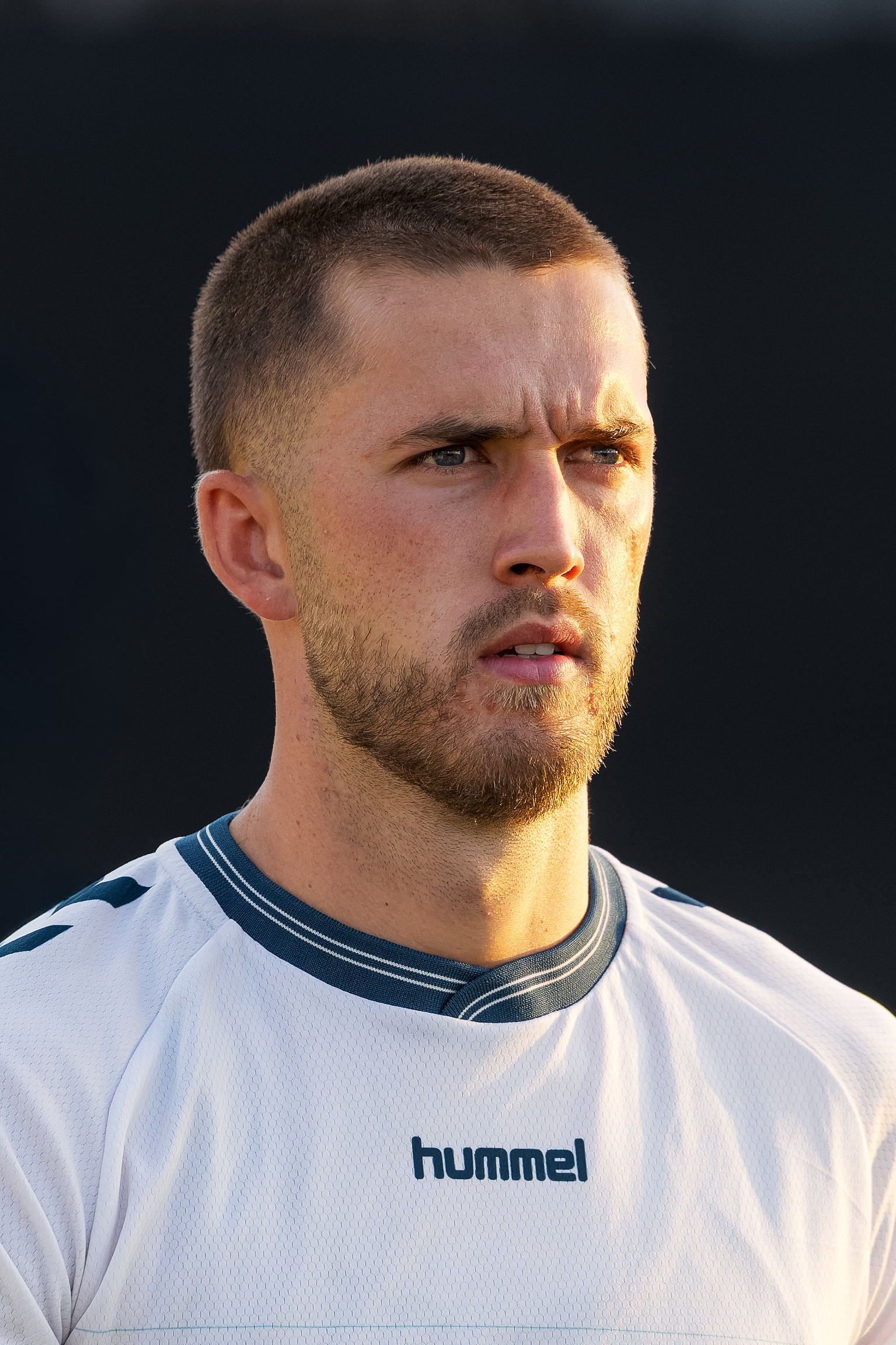
- O'Dwyer with Sarasota Paradise in 2026

Personal information
- Date of birth: 1 March 1999 (age 27)
- Place of birth: Lingfield, England
- Height: 1.88 m (6 ft 2 in)
- Positions: Attacking midfielder; striker

Youth career
- –2017: Three Bridges

College career
Years	Team	Apps	(Gls)
2018–2019	UMass Minutemen	22	(0)
2020–2021	Christian Brothers Buccaneers	24	(17)

Senior career*
Years	Team	Apps	(Gls)
2017	Three Bridges		
2021	Des Moines Menace	12	(1)
2022–2025	Richmond Kickers	76	(12)
2026	Sarasota Paradise	26	(1)
- * Club domestic league appearances and goals as of 13:35, 2 November 2026 (UTC)

Chandler O'Dwyer (born 1 Mar 1999) is an English professional footballer who plays as an attacking midfielder and striker most recently for Sarasota Paradise in USL League One.

O'Dwyer played college soccer for University of Massachusetts Amherst and Christian Brothers University.

== Career ==
=== Amateur and college ===
O'Dwyer, born in Lingfield, Surrey, competed with Isthmian League side Three Bridges at youth and senior level.

In 2018, O'Dwyer moved to the United States to play college soccer at the University of Massachusetts Amherst. In two full seasons with the Minutemen, O'Dwyer made 22 appearances and tallied five assists. The 2020 season was cancelled due to the COVID-19 pandemic. For the 2020–21 season, O'Dwyer transferred to Christian Brothers University, where he scored 17 goals in 24 appearances for the Buccaneers, earning 2020 Gulf South Conference (GSC) All-Tournament Team honours and D2CCA First Team All-South Region in 2021, was voted the Gulf South Conference Offensive Player of the Year, as well as being named to the GSC Spring Academic Honor Roll.

While at college, O'Dwyer also competed in the USL League Two with Des Moines Menace, where he scored a single goal in 13 appearances across the regular season and playoffs.

=== Professional ===
On 8 February 2022, O'Dwyer signed his first professional contract with USL League One side Richmond Kickers. On 23 April 2022, he make his professional debut for the Kickers in a 1–0 win against North Carolina Fusion U-23 in the USL Cup. He made his league debut for Richmond on 2 July 2022, appearing as a 77th-minute substitute during a 4–1 win over North Carolina FC. He would make a total of 3 appearances and would win the title with the Kickers.

==== 2023 ====
On 30 August 2023, He would score his first goal for the Kickers in a 3–3 draw against Central Valley Fuego. On 14 October 2023 he would score his second goal in the season in a 4–5 loss against Central Valley Fuego.

==== 2024 ====
On 4 April 2024, he scored in the 2nd round of the U.S. Open Cup in 5–2 win against Maryland Bobcats. On 6 April, He would score his first 2 goals for the 2024 season in a 3–2 win against Central Valley Fuego. He also scored a goal in a 1–2 win against One Knoxville. On 29 August, he scored a brace in a 3–2 win against Spokane Velocity in the USL Cup, however they would get knocked out in the group stage. On 21 September, he scored a goal in a 3–0 win against Lexington he would also assist Nil Vinyals' goal. They would make it to the playoffs but, they would get knocked out in a 1–0 loss against Union Omaha.

==== 2025 ====
O'Dwyer started the 2025 season, by scoring a goal in a 4–2 win against Tormenta FC. Two weeks later, he scored in a 3–1 win against expansion club, AV Alta. On 19 April 2025, he provided two assists for Josh Kirkland's goals in a 4–4 draw against Westchester SC, another expansion club. He also scored a goal in a 3–3 draw against Greenville Triumph. On 20 September 2025, he scored his final goal for the club, in a 2–3 loss against Charlotte Independence away from home. He finished his final season with 28 appearances and 4 goals as he would leave the Richmond Kickers when his contract was declined.

==== Sarasota Paradise ====
O'Dwyer signed for USL League One expansion club, Sarasota Paradise.
