= Beckett Howell =

American soccer player (born 2005)

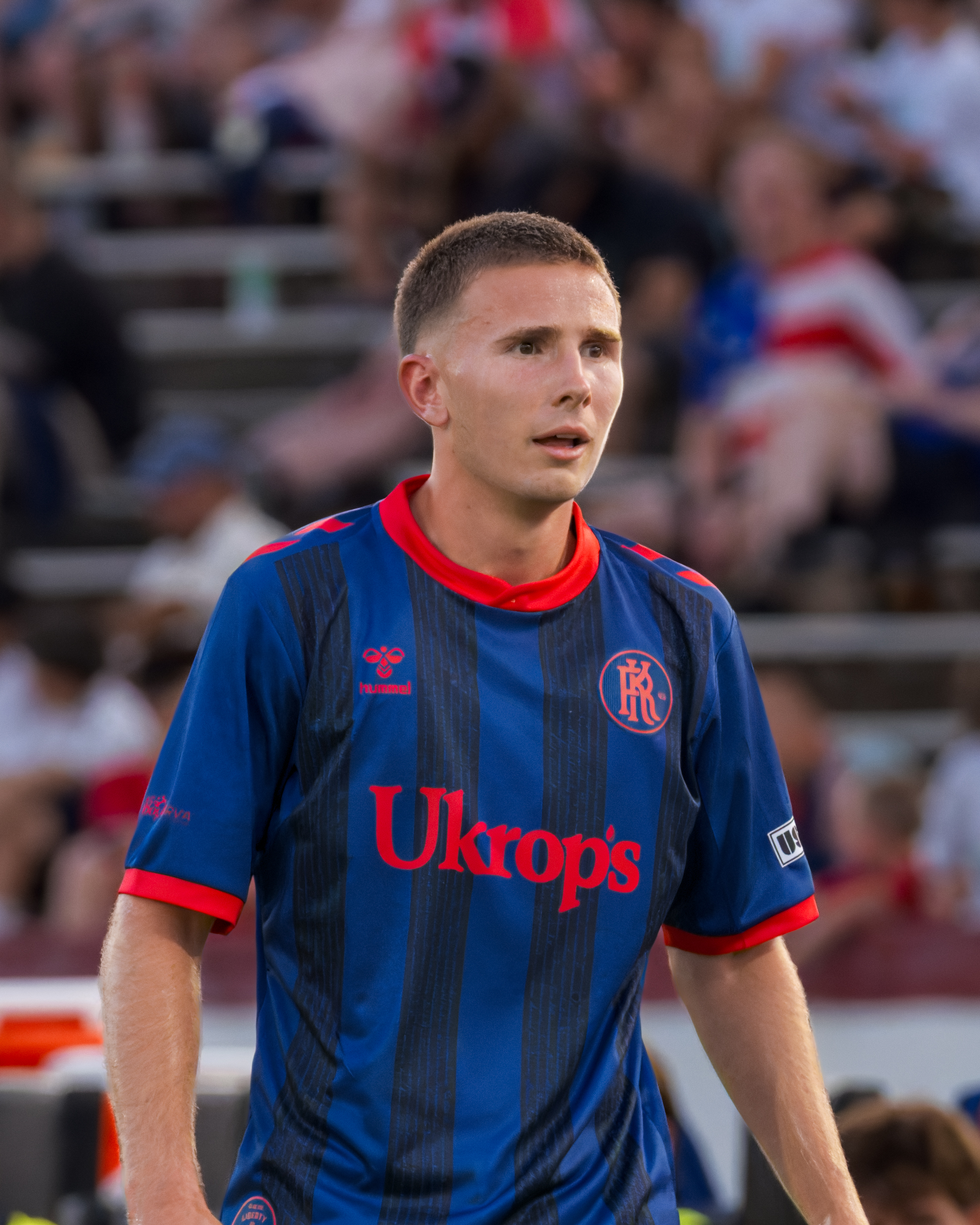
- Howell with the Richmond Kickers in 2026

Personal information
- Date of birth: March 31, 2005 (age 21)
- Place of birth: Richmond, Virginia, United States
- Height: 1.89 m (6 ft 2 in)
- Position: Defender

Team information
- Current team: Richmond Kickers
- Number: 34

Youth career
- 2011–2016: Richmond Strikers
- 2017–2022: Richmond Kickers

Senior career*
Years	Team	Apps	(Gls)
2023–	Richmond Kickers	52	(0)
- * Club domestic league appearances and goals as of November 2, 2026

Beckett Howell (born March 31, 2005) is an American professional soccer player who currently plays for the Richmond Kickers in USL League One.

== Club career ==
Ahead of the 2023 USL League One season, Howell signed a USL Academy Amateur contract with the Richmond Kickers. Howell began the season making occasional squad appearances, before making his professional debut on April 6, 2023, against the Cleveland SC in a 3-2 Victory. Howell continued his momentum eventually making his USL League One debut with the Kickers on April 30, 2023, coming on in the 86th minute in a 3–1 victory against Tormenta.

By the end of the 2023 season, Howell was a regular starter at left back for the Kickers starting the final four matches of the season. Howell ultimately made 13 appearances for the Kickers in the 2023 season, 12 in USL League One play and once in U.S. Open Cup play. At the end of the season, Howell signed his first professional contract with the Kickers.
