= Nils Seufert =

German footballer (born 1997)

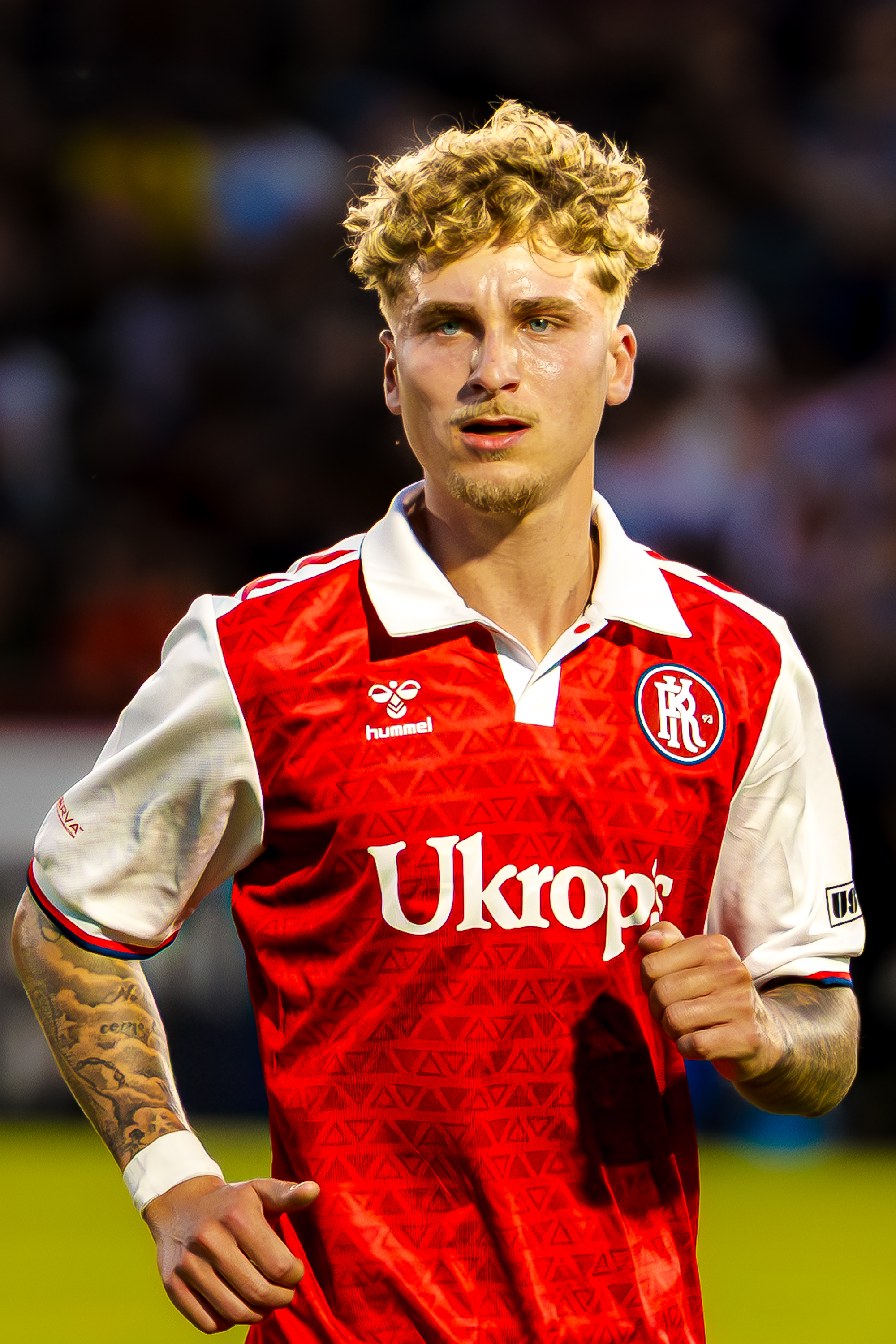
- Seufert with the Richmond Kickers in 2026

Personal information
- Date of birth: 3 February 1997 (age 29)
- Place of birth: Mannheim, Germany
- Height: 1.79 m (5 ft 10 in)
- Position: Midfielder

Team information
- Current team: Richmond Kickers
- Number: 10

Youth career
- Waldhof Mannheim
- SC Käfertal
- 2011–2015: 1. FC Kaiserslautern

Senior career*
Years	Team	Apps	(Gls)
2015	1. FC Kaiserslautern II	52	(7)
2016–2018	1. FC Kaiserslautern	20	(0)
2018–2021	Arminia Bielefeld	48	(0)
2021–2023	Greuther Fürth	8	(0)
2022	→ SV Sandhausen (loan)	7	(0)
2023–2024	SV Ried	21	(1)
2024–2025	Jerv	8	(1)
2025–	Richmond Kickers	48	(6)
- * Club domestic league appearances and goals as of November 2, 2026

Nils Seufert (born 3 February 1997) is a German professional footballer who plays as a midfielder for USL League One club Richmond Kickers.

== Career ==
Seufert made his professional debut for 1. FC Kaiserslautern on 25 October 2017, starting in a home match in the second round of the 2017–18 DFB-Pokal against Bundesliga club VfB Stuttgart.

In May 2021 Greuther Fürth, newly promoted to the Bundesliga, announced the signing of Seufert for the 2021–22 season. He signed a contract until 2024 and joined on a free transfer from Arminia Bielefeld.

On 1 January 2022, Seufert was loaned to SV Sandhausen until the end of the season.

On 10 July 2023, Seufert signed a two-year contract with SV Ried in Austria.

On 27 August 2024, Seufert signed a contract with Jerv in Norwegian third tier until 2025.

=== Richmond Kickers ===
==== 2025 ====
On 24 January 2025, Seufert signed with Richmond Kickers of USL League One. He would make his debut and score his first goal in a 4–2 win against South Georgia Tormenta. On 27 September, he would score his second goal for the club in a 4–2 loss against the same club.

He would also score a brace in a demolishing 5–1 win against Forward Madison FC in their last game of the season.

==== 2026 ====
On 11 April 2026, Seufert made his first appearance in the 2026 season getting subbed in a 3–1 loss against Spokane Velocity. His first match as a starter for the season was in a 3–0 loss against MLS club Columbus Crew in the U.S. Open Cup.
