= Simon Fitch =

American soccer player (born 1999)

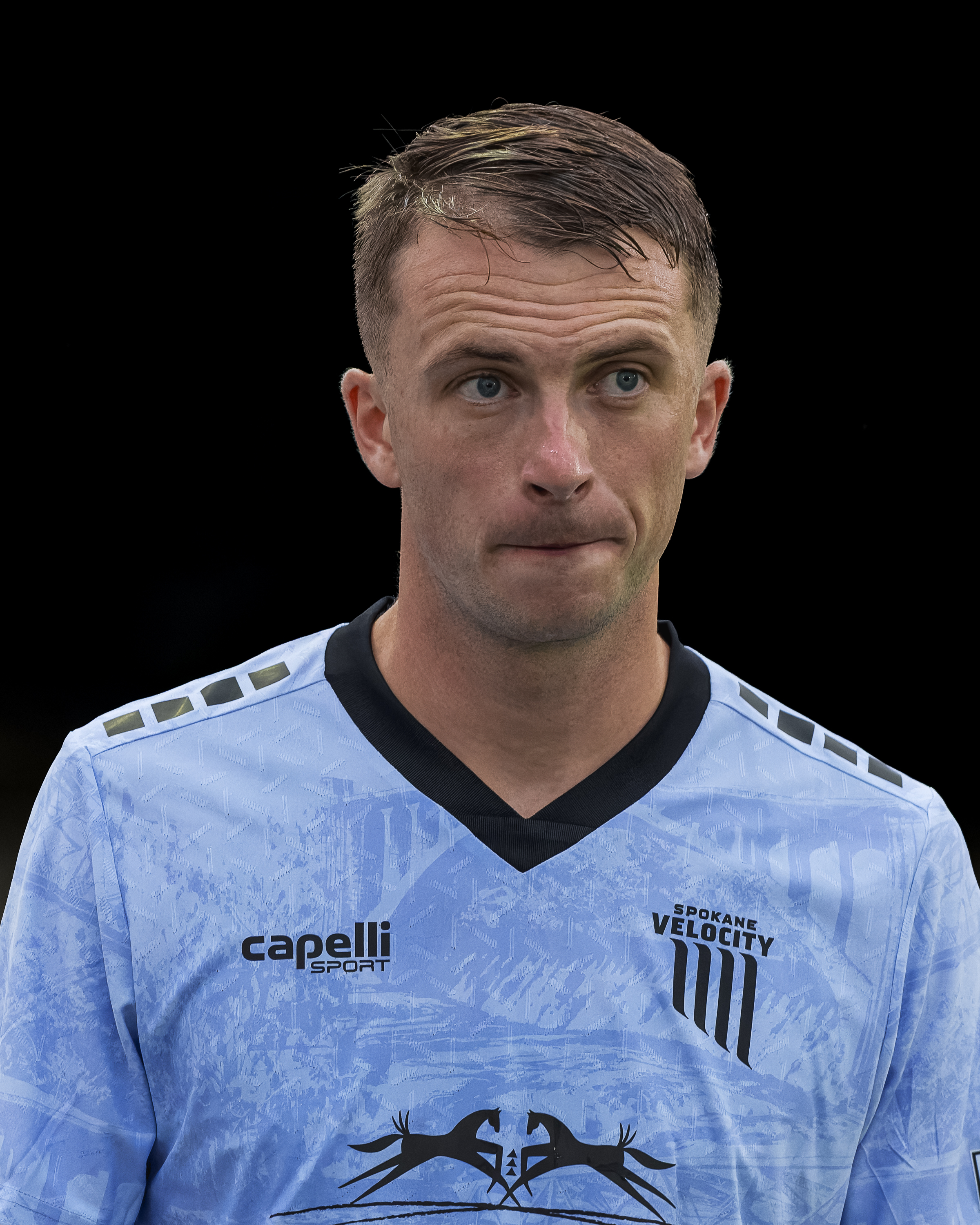
- Fitch with Spokane Velocity in 2026

Personal information
- Full name: Michael Simon Fitch
- Date of birth: February 26, 1999 (age 27)
- Place of birth: Richmond, Virginia, United States
- Height: 6 ft 1 in (1.85 m)
- Positions: Defender; midfielder

Team information
- Current team: Spokane Velocity
- Number: 4

Youth career
- 2016–2017: Richmond United

College career
Years	Team	Apps	(Gls)
2017	George Washington Colonials	18	(0)
2018–2021	VCU Rams	63	(5)

Senior career*
Years	Team	Apps	(Gls)
2020–2021	Lionsbridge FC	4	(1)
2022–2025	Richmond Kickers	104	(3)
2026–	Spokane Velocity	23	(0)
- * Club domestic league appearances and goals as of November 2, 2026

Michael Simon Fitch (born February 26, 1999) is an American soccer player who plays as a defender for USL League One club Spokane Velocity.

== Career ==
=== Youth, college and amateur ===
Fitch attended St. Christopher's School, leading the team to the Virginia Independent Schools Athletic Association State Championship in 2016, serving as team captain for three years, and was a High School Honor Roll member. During 2016 and 2017, he also played club soccer with Richmond United.

In 2017, Fitch went to George Washington University to play college soccer. He made 18 appearances for the Colonials, before transferring to Virginia Commonwealth University in 2018. With the Rams, Fitch went on to make 63 appearances, scoring five goals and tallying four assists. He earned Atlantic 10 All-Academic Team honors in four consecutive seasons.

While at college, Fitch also played in the USL League Two with Lionsbridge FC. The 2020 season was cancelled due to the COVID-19 pandemic, but made four appearances and scored a single goal in the 2021 season.

=== Professional ===
On February 23, 2022, Fitch signed with USL League One club Richmond Kickers. He made his professional debut on April 25, 2022, appearing as an injury-time substitute during a 2–1 win over Charlotte Independence. He would leave the club at the end of their 2025 season.

==== Spokane Velocity ====
On 27 January 2025, Fitch signed for Spokane Velocity for the 2026 season.

== Personal life ==
He is engaged to professional soccer player Susanna Friedrichs.
