= Maxi Schenfeld =

Chilean footballer (born 1992)

Personal information
- Full name: Maximiliano Alberto Schenfeld Bou
- Date of birth: 18 October 1992 (age 34)
- Place of birth: Ovalle, Chile
- Height: 1.70 m (5 ft 7 in)
- Position: Left-back

Youth career
- Academia Kico Rojas
- Coquimbo Unido
- Banfield
- Tigre
- Platense

College career
Years	Team	Apps	(Gls)
2013	Florida Memorial Lions	14	(2)
2014	IUPUI Jaguars	0	(0)
2018	Florida National Conquistadors	16	(1)

Senior career*
Years	Team	Apps	(Gls)
2012	Ferro Carril Sud	1	(0)
2013	Barnechea		
2017	Miami Fusion	11	(2)
2018	Miami United	11	(1)
2019	Miami FC	3	(0)
2020	FC Tulsa	0	(0)
2021	FC Tucson	24	(1)
2022	Central Valley Fuego	25	(2)
2022–2023	Baltimore Blast (indoor)	14	(1)
2023–2025	Harrisburg Heat (indoor)	8	(1)
2024–2025	Richmond Kickers	45	(2)
- * Club domestic league appearances and goals as of October 31, 2025

Maximiliano Alberto Schenfeld Bou (born 18 October 1992) is a Chilean footballer who plays as a left-back.

== Career ==
=== Youth ===
As a child, Schenfeld was with Academia Kico Rojas in his birthplace, Ovalle. Next, he spent a year with Coquimbo Unido before moving to Argentina, where he spent time Banfield, Tigre, Platense and Ferro Carril Sud. He also briefly returned to Chile with Barnechea.

=== College ===
Schenfeld moved to the United States in 2013 to play college soccer at Florida Memorial University. He made 14 appearances, scoring 2 goals and tallying 2 assists for the Lions. In 2014, he transferred to Indiana University–Purdue University Indianapolis, but redshirted the whole season after not been cleared to compete. He played one season with Florida National University in 2018.

=== Professional ===
Schenfeld spent time with NPSL sides Miami Fusion and Miami United.

In 2019, he moved to Miami FC for their lone season in the NISA.

On 18 December 2019, Schenfeld joined USL Championship side FC Tulsa ahead of the 2020 season. However, he did not appear for the club in any competition.

On 22 April 2021, Schenfeld signed with USL League One side FC Tucson.

Schenfeld signed with USL League One side Central Valley Fuego on 10 March 2022 ahead of their inaugural season.

Schenfeld played with the Baltimore Blast during the 2022–23 Major Arena Soccer League season and with the Harrisburg Heat during the 2023–24 season.

On 18 January 2024, Schenfeld returned to USL League One, signing with the Richmond Kickers. However, he would leave the Kickers when his contract expired in 2025.

== Personal ==
Maxi is married to his Argentinean wife Carolina Ballero. Maxi's father is the Argentine former professional footballer Alberto Aníbal Schenfeld, who played for Deportes Ovalle, and also coached it in 2012.

Schenfeld earned his bachelor's degree in psychology from Florida Memorial University.
