= Pablo Jara =

Chilean footballer (born 1994)

Personal information
- Full name: Pablo Octavio Jara Rojas
- Date of birth: 2 April 1994 (age 32)
- Place of birth: Santiago, Chile
- Height: 1.82 m (6 ft 0 in)
- Position: Goalkeeper

Youth career
- Colo-Colo

College career
Years	Team	Apps	(Gls)
2015–2018	Wingate Bulldogs	80	(0)

Senior career*
Years	Team	Apps	(Gls)
2012–2014	Colo-Colo B	16	(0)
2018	South Georgia Tormenta	12	(0)
2019–2023	South Georgia Tormenta	108	(0)
2024–2025	Richmond Kickers	15	(0)

International career
2010	Chile U17		
- * Club domestic league appearances and goals as of 31 October 2025

Pablo Octavio Jara Rojas (born 2 April 1994) is a Chilean professional footballer who plays as a goalkeeper.

== Club career ==
=== Professional ===
After a successful season with Tormenta FC in the PDL, Jara was signed by the team ahead of its inaugural season in USL League One. He made his professional debut for the club on 29 March 2019 in a 1–0 home victory over the Greenville Triumph. Jara was part of the 2022 Tormenta FC team that won the USL League One Championship.

On 13 December 2023, Jara signed with the Richmond Kickers. He would leave the Kickers at the end of 2025.

== International career ==
Jara represented Chile U17 at the 2010 South American Games.
