= Hayden Anderson (soccer) =

American soccer player (born 2001)

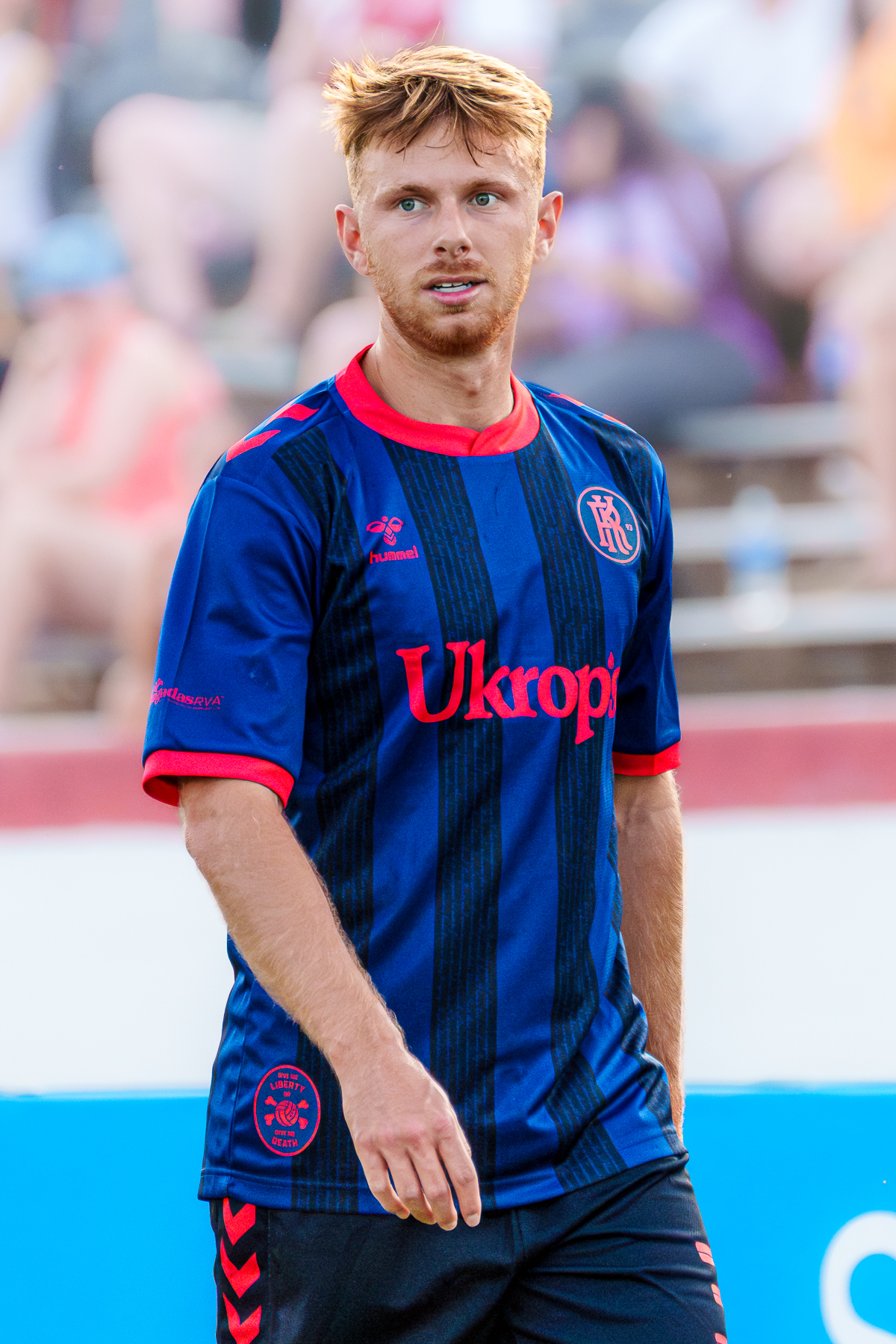
- Anderson with the Richmond Kickers in 2026

Personal information
- Date of birth: 16 January 2001 (age 25)
- Place of birth: Spartanburg, South Carolina, United States
- Height: 1.78 m (5 ft 10 in)
- Positions: Right-back; right winger

Team information
- Current team: Richmond Kickers
- Number: 3

Youth career
- Woodmont High School
- 2019: Carolina Elite
- 2019: Greenville FC

College career
Years	Team	Apps	(Gls)
2019–2021	USC Upstate Spartans	27	(0)
2022–2023	Memphis Tigers	38	(1)

Senior career*
Years	Team	Apps	(Gls)
2021	Philadelphia Lone Star	9	(0)
2022	Pensacola FC		
2023	Mississippi Brilla		
2024	Greenville Triumph	21	(3)
2025–	Richmond Kickers	54	(2)
- * Club domestic league appearances and goals as of November 2, 2026

Hayden Anderson (born 16 January 2001) is an American soccer player who plays as a right-back and right winger for the Richmond Kickers in USL League One.

== Early life ==
Hayden Anderson was born on 16 January 2001, in Spartanburg, South Carolina, but he grew up in Simpsonville, South Carolina as it is his hometown.

== Youth and college career ==
Anderson played football at Woodmont High School. He also played for Carolina Elite and Greenville FC in 2019.

In 2019, he went to USC Upstate Spartans to join their soccer team and played a total of 28 games but no goals.

He moved to Tennessee in 2022, and joined the Memphis Tigers. He would play a total of 38 games and scored one goal.

== Professional career ==
On 1 May 2021, while still in college with the Upstate Spartans, he signed an academy contract with Philadelphia Lone Star in USL League Two. He would make a total of 9 appearances for the club.

In May 2022, Anderson signed another academy contract for Pensacola FC in the National Premier Soccer League.

In May of the following year, Anderson joined Mississippi Brilla in USL League Two.

=== Greenville Triumph ===
On 18 January 2024, Anderson signed for Greenville Triumph in USL League One. On 23 March, Anderson made his debut for Greenville in a 0–0 draw against Forward Madison. He would score his first goal for the club in a 3–1 loss against Chattanooga Red Wolves on 2 June. On 14 September, Anderson scored in a 5–2 win against Chattanooga Red Wolves. On 26 October, he scored his last goal for the club in a 5–1 victory over Tormenta FC.

=== Richmond Kickers ===
On 23 January 2025, Anderson signed for the Richmond Kickers in USL League One. He made his debut in a 4–2 win against Tormenta FC and he would also score his first goal. He would score his second goal of the season in a 5–2 loss against expansion club Portland Hearts of Pine.

On 18 November 2025, Anderson restructured his contract making it expire until the end of the 2026 season. Anderson made his debut in the 2026 season in a 1–1 draw against AV Alta.
