= Landon Johnson (soccer) =

American soccer player (born 2006)

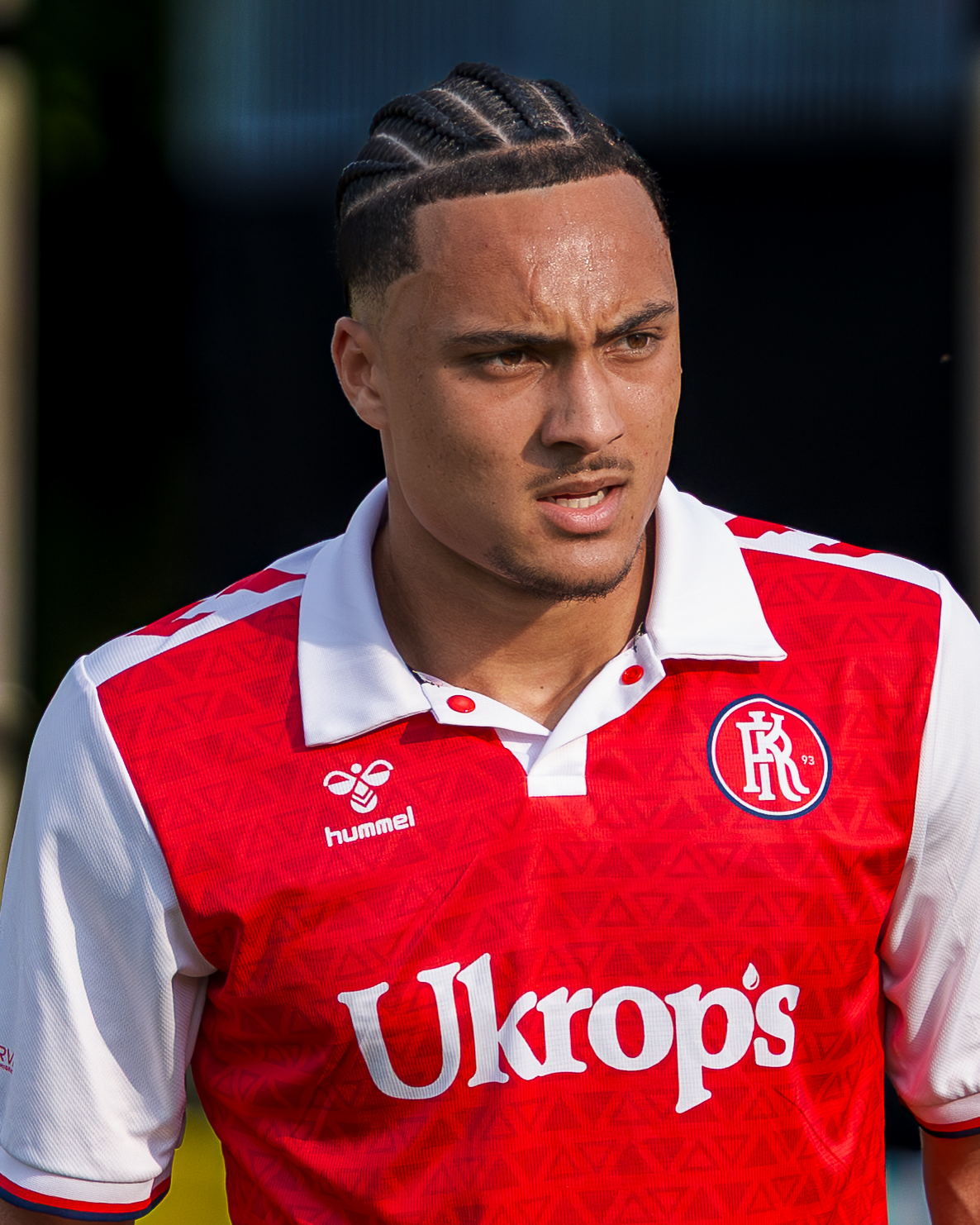
- Johnson with the Richmond Kickers in 2026

Personal information
- Date of birth: November 10, 2006 (age 19)
- Place of birth: Chesterfield, Virginia, United States
- Height: 1.75 m (5 ft 9 in)
- Position: Winger

Team information
- Current team: Richmond Kickers
- Number: 7

Youth career
- –2022: Richmond Kickers
- 2022–2023: Atlanta United
- 2023: Richmond Kickers

Senior career*
Years	Team	Apps	(Gls)
2023–	Richmond Kickers	59	(3)
- * Club domestic league appearances and goals as of November 2, 2026

Landon Johnson (born November 10, 2006) is an American professional soccer player who plays as a winger for Richmond Kickers in USL League One.

== Early life ==
Landon Johnson was born on November 10, 2006. He also has a brother named Ty, who currently plays college soccer for the VCU Rams.

== Youth career ==
Johnson started his youth career for the Richmond Kickers Academy. In 2022 he moved to Atlanta to join Atlanta United's youth academy.

== Professional career ==
On July 11, 2023, Johnson signed a contract to rejoin his former team the Richmond Kickers in USL League One on an USL Academy contract for the 2023 season.

=== 2023 ===
On July 22, he made his debut for the club in a 3–1 loss against Northern Colorado Hailstorm. He would make a total of 11 appearances in the 2023 season. On September 12, he signed his first professional contract for the Kickers.

=== 2024 ===
He would make his debut for the 2024 season, in a 3–1 win against Tormenta FC. Johnson made eight appearances in the 2024 season, as the Kickers made it to the playoffs, losing to Union Omaha in the quarter-finals.

=== 2025 ===
Johnson made his first appearance in the 2025 season, in a 4–2 win against Tormenta FC. On August 2, 2025, Johnson scored his first USL League One goal in a 2–1 loss against expansion club, FC Naples. He would score another goal against another expansion club, Westchester SC on September 3, 2025, which would come out as a 2–0 win. He would make a total of 15 appearances and scoring two goals.

=== 2026 ===
In the 2026 season, he would make his first appearance starting in a 1–1 draw against AV Alta. He scored his first goal of the 2026 season in a 3–0 win against Greenville Triumph.
