= Richmond Strikers =

Soccer club in Richmond, Virginia

- Full name: Richmond Strikers Football Club
- Founded: 1975 as Three Chopt Soccer Association
- Website: http://www.richmondstrikers.com

Richmond Strikers is a sports club based in Henrico County, near Richmond, Virginia. The Strikers' team colors are orange, white, and black. The Strikers are a multi-sport club and offer soccer, lacrosse, field hockey, cricket, and rugby. The Strikers have over 6,000 members from travel soccer, recreation, adult league and all other sports. The Strikers are also the host of the Jefferson Cup, one of the largest youth soccer tournaments in the United States.

== Club history ==
The Strikers were formed in 1975 as Three Chopt Soccer Association. In 1986, they adopted the Strikers name. In 2006, the Strikers merged with Virginia Capital Area Soccer League (CASL), making the Strikers one of the largest clubs in Virginia. In 2010, they announced a working relationship with the Premier League club, Arsenal. In 2015, the Strikers announced the addition of girls lacrosse and field hockey. In 2017, the club added boys lacrosse and rugby.

== Notable players ==
Notable players who have played for the Strikers include:

- (United States) Will Bates
- (United States) Adam Cristman
- (United States) Kenneth Cutler
- (Lebanon) Joseph Haboush
- (United States) Chantel Jones
- (United States) Brad Knighton
- (United States) Brian Ownby
- (United States) Brandon Pollard
- (United States) Will Pulisic
