= Richmond Kickers =

American professional soccer club based in Richmond

- Full name: Richmond Kickers Soccer Club
- Nickname: Roos
- Founded: 1993; 33 years ago
- Stadium: City Stadium; Richmond, Virginia
- Capacity: 6,000
- Owner(s): 22 Holdings, LLC (majority); RKYSC (minority)
- Chairman: Robert Ukrop
- Head coach: Brian Ownby
- League: USL League One
- 2026: USL League One, 16th of 17
- Website: richmondkickers.com
Home colors	Away colors	Third colors

The Richmond Kickers are an American professional soccer club based in Richmond, Virginia. The Kickers compete as a member of USL League One (USL1). The club was established in 1993, and began play that same year as a United States Interregional Soccer League (now USL League Two) expansion team, which at the time, was the fourth tier of soccer in the United States.

The club's majority owner is 22 Holdings, LLC. Brian Ownby has been the club's manager since 2026.

The Kickers play their home league matches at City Stadium, with a reduced capacity of 6,000 seats for most matches. City Stadium has been the club's primary home since 1995. The club has one primary supporters group: the Red Army, who sit in Section O of the stadium. Richmond has rivalries with fellow Mid-Atlantic and Deep South soccer clubs including the Charleston Battery and Greenville Triumph. The Kickers had an intrastate rivalry with the Virginia Beach Mariners, where the two sides competed for the James River Cup until the Mariners folded in 2009.

The Kickers played their inaugural match on May 8, 1993, winning 1–0 over the now defunct Columbia Spirit. Richmond has won eight trophies over the course of their history including four regular season titles across the second, third, and fourth divisions, and three playoffs championships across the third and fourth divisions. The club has won the U.S. Open Cup once, winning the domestic cup in 1995. The club earned a berth into the 1996 CONCACAF Cup Winners Cup, but ultimately did not play in the tournament.

Today the club is one of the most well-attended USL League One teams, with an average of 3,000 to 4,000 fans per match.

The team has been known to develop several players who have notable soccer careers. Some notable players who played for the Richmond Kickers include, Derrick Etienne, Clyde Simms, Chris Durkin, Dwayne De Rosario, and Matt Turner. Some players who played a majority of their career with Richmond include Matthew Delicâte, Yomby William, Robert Ukrop, and Kevin Jeffrey.

== History ==
=== 1993–2019 ===
The Richmond Kickers were founded in 1993 and played their inaugural season in the United States Interregional Soccer League (USISL), which, at the time, represented the third division of the American soccer pyramid. The team originally played their home matches on the campus of the University of Richmond and targeted players specifically from Virginia. After a poor season in 1994, the club self-relegated to the newly formed fourth-tier USISL Premier League, now known as the USL League Two. During the 1995 season, the Kickers battled to a 15–3 winning season and went on to win the first ever USISL Premier League championship, defeating the now-defunct Cocoa Expos in the championship. That same season, Richmond won their only, Lamar Hunt U.S. Open Cup championship. The following year, Richmond chose to rejoin the third division, where they reached the USISL Select League championship, only to lose to the California Jaguars in the finals.

For the next nine seasons, Richmond played in the second tier of the American soccer pyramid, earning the Commissioner's Cup twice, in 1998 and 2001, as well as earning two conference championships. However, the club was never able to secure a division two league championship, their closest coming in 2005, when the Kickers fell to the Seattle Sounders in the 2005 USL First Division Championship. After the 2005 season, the Kickers ownership self-relegated the team back into the third division, citing possible financial problems for the club if they remained in the second tier. Since joining the third division, the Kickers have had tremendous success, making it to at least the playoff semifinals each season they have played in the third division. Additionally, the Kickers have won two third division premierships and two third division championships during their spell.

In September 2005, the club retired Rob Ukrop's #6 jersey. Ukrop played for the inaugural 1993 Kickers and the 1995 U.S. Open Cup team, joined the New England Revolution at the launch of Major League Soccer before returning midway through the 1996 season to play out his career in his hometown.

Richmond Kickers have not only experienced league success, but have been perennial contenders in the Lamar Hunt U.S. Open Cup tournament. In the 2007 U.S. Open Cup, the Kickers defeated the Los Angeles Galaxy of the first division, Major League Soccer, 1–0 in the third round of competition. The Kickers won their First Round match of the 2008 U.S. Open Cup, beating the Fredericksburg Gunners of the PDL with a final scoreline of 3–0. The Kickers won their second-round game over the Western Mass Pioneers 2–1 before being eliminated from the Cup in the third round by MLS side, and defending USOC champion, New England Revolution, 3–0. In the 2011 US Open Cup the Kickers made a Cinderella run, defeating MLS clubs Columbus Crew and Sporting Kansas City to reach the semi-finals, before falling to the Chicago Fire.

The Kickers briefly sponsored two developmental teams of their own: Richmond Kickers Future and Richmond Kickers Destiny. Future played in the men's USL Premier Development League from 2002 to 2008, while the Destiny played in the women's USL W-League from 2004 to 2009. The Kickers entered a multi-year deal to become the USL Pro affiliate of D.C. United in 2013, and continued that affiliation through 2018. Loudoun United FC was launched as a fully owned-and-operated affiliate of D.C. United for the 2019 USL Championship season, presumably ending the Kickers' affiliation tenure.

=== USL League One era and new ownership (2019–present) ===
After two losing seasons in the second-division USL Championship, the Kickers announced that they were self-relegating and becoming inaugural members of the new third division league, USL League One. In addition to joining a new league, the Kickers announced that 22 Holdings, LLC, an organization consisting of former Davidson College soccer players and led by former Kickers player Rob Ukrop, had acquired a controlling interest in the team. The former majority owners, the Richmond Kickers Youth Soccer Club, would continue holding a minority interest in the team and operating as the team's youth organization.

On 15 June 2026, the club announced that they had parted ways with Darren Sawatzky after nearly seven seasons. As a result assistant coach and former Kickers player, Brian Ownby was appointed on a interim basis.

On 28 October 2026, the club announced that they named Ownby as head coach for the 2027 season.

== Colors and badge ==
Crest of the Richmond Kickers used from 2012 to 2024

The Kickers' primary colors are red and white, having been so since the beginning of the 2001 season. Their kits are manufactured by Hummel, as they have been since at least 2009. In March 2012, the Kickers revealed a new logo designed by branding firm yogg llc to celebrate 20 years since their inception. Along with the new crest, the club also announced they would be using a third uniform with the colors from their first season in 1993, green and blue. They also have a black kit they have used during the 2013 season.

For the 2022 season, the club released "legacy kits" for the season which included the club's original green color in the home kits. The club used the original 1993 logo in the kits.

In January 2025, the club released their third logo, featuring an interlocking R and K, as well as alternative logos featuring a kangaroo.

=== Kit history ===
Home, away, and third kits.

- Home

1993	1995	1998	1999	2001	2002–03	2004–05	2006–08	2009–10

2011–12	2013–14	2015	2016	2017–18	2019	2020	2021	2022

2023	2024	2025	2026

- Away

1993	2000–01	2002	2003	2004–05	2006	2009	2011–12	2013–14

2015	2017	2018–21	2020	2021	2022	2023	2024	2025

2026

- Third

2012–13	2021	2022	2024	2025	2026

== Stadium ==
- E. Claiborne Robins Stadium, University of Richmond, Richmond, Virginia (1993–1994)
- City Stadium, Richmond, Virginia (1995–present)

== Club culture ==
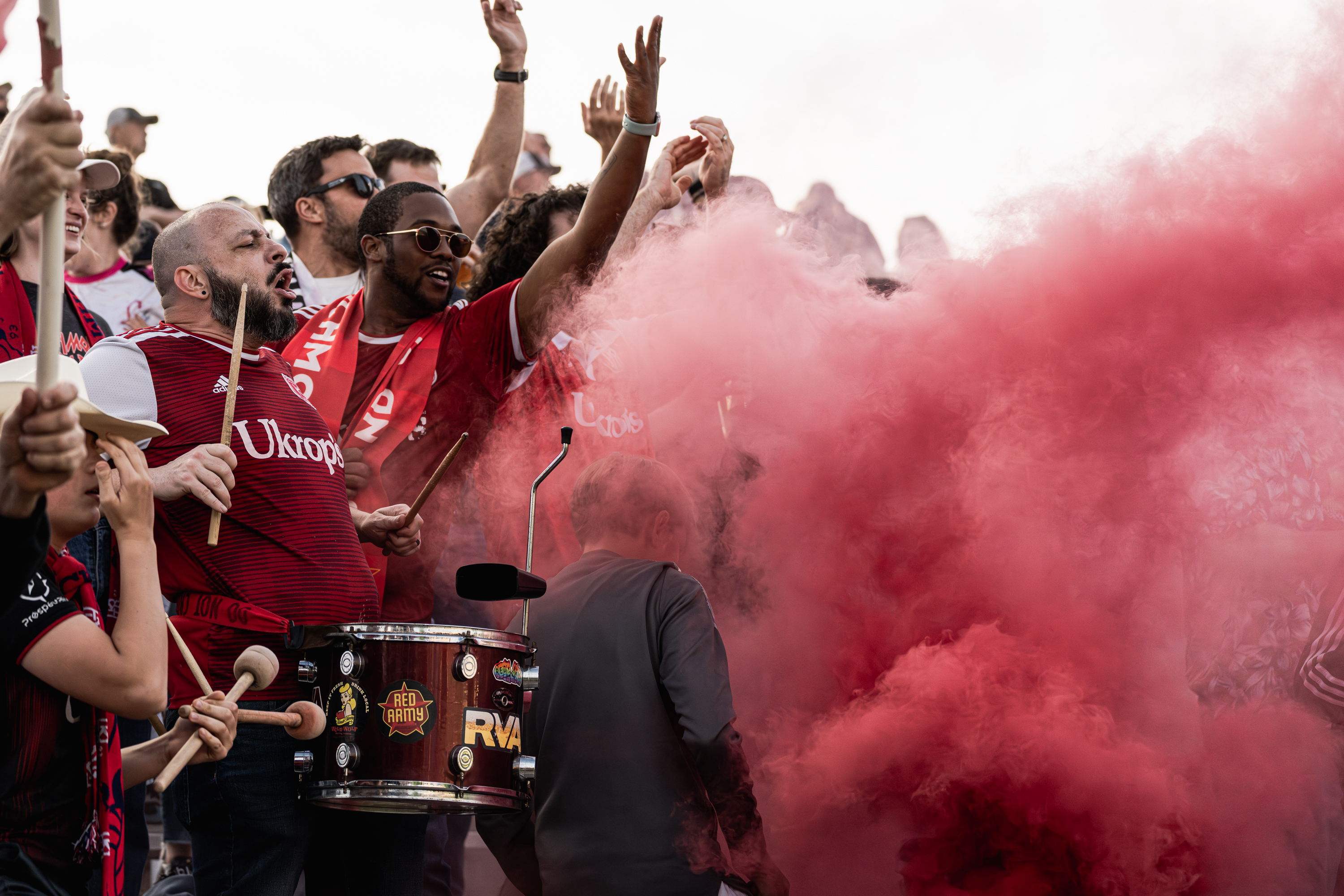
Red Army supporters celebrate a goal

=== Supporters ===
The Kickers' supporters groups sit in section O of City Stadium. The two supporters groups are the River City Red Army, which formed in 2010, and the Scuffletown Social Club, which formed in 2020.

=== James River Cup ===
The James River Cup was an annual competition held between the Richmond Kickers and the Virginia Beach Mariners (formerly Hampton Roads Mariners) which the team with the most points at the conclusion of all scheduled matches between the two teams would win. The Cup was held every year since 1996 with the exception of 1997 and 2001 when Virginia Beach did not field a team. In 2007, the Virginia Beach team was disbanded.

For the 2008 season, the James River Cup was contested between the Kickers' organization and the Hampton Roads Piranhas organization. The cup went to the organization that had the most points in games between their PDL and W-League teams. The series ended up tied 2–2–1, with the Piranhas winning the Cup on goal difference.

==== Winners ====
- 2008: Hampton Roads Piranhas
- 2007: Not held
- 2006: Virginia Beach Mariners
- 2005: Richmond Kickers
- 2004: Richmond Kickers
- 2003: Richmond Kickers
- 2002: Richmond Kickers
- 2001: Not held
- 2000: Richmond Kickers
- 1999: Richmond Kickers
- 1998: Richmond Kickers
- 1997: Not held
- 1996: Hampton Roads Mariners

== Players and staff ==
=== Current roster ===
As of November 10, 2026

Note: Flags indicate national team as defined under FIFA eligibility rules; some limited exceptions apply. Players may hold more than one non-FIFA nationality.

No.	Pos.	Nation	Player
1	GK	CAN	Yann Fillion
2	DF	USA	Dakota Barnathan
3	MF	USA	Hayden Anderson
4	DF	AUS	Sam Layton
5	DF	USA	Ethan Kos
6	DF	USA	Ali Sasankhah
7	MF	USA	Landon Johnson
9	FW	USA	Josh Kirkland
10	MF	GER	Nils Seufert
11	FW	GER	Tarik Pannholzer
12	FW	USA	Owen O'Malley
13	GK	USA	Alex Wintsch
14	FW	USA	Zahir Vazquez

No.	Pos.	Nation	Player
18	MF	USA	Austin Amer
19	FW	HON	Darwin Espinal
22	DF	USA	Sean Vinberg
23	FW	USA	Tyler Freeman
26	DF	NGR	Mujeeb Murana
32	MF	USA	Matt Bolduc
34	DF	USA	Beckett Howell
35	GK	USA	James Sneddon
43	DF	USA	Greyson Cadjoe
44	DF	USA	Axel Gallegos
45	DF	USA	Harold Hanson
70	FW	BRA	Lucca Dourado
99	DF	USA	Daniel Moore

USL Academy Contract

=== Club management ===
Front office
Chairman and CEO	Robert Ukrop
President and COO	Camp Peery
Coaching staff
Head Coach	Brian Ownby
Interim Assistant Coach	Evan Munn
Assistant Coach	Mac Phillips

Last updated: November 10, 2026
Source: Richmond Kickers Front Office

=== Head coaching history ===
Dates	Name	Notes
1993	(United States) Bobby Lennon	
1994	(Canada) John Kerr, Sr.	
1995–1996	(England) Dennis Viollet	Led team to only U.S. Open Cup title and USISL championship
1997	(United States) Frank Kohlenstein	
1998–1999	(Northern Ireland) Colin Clarke	
2000–2018	(England) Leigh Cowlishaw	Longest tenured coach in club history
2018–2019	(United States) David Bulow	
2019–2026	(United States) Darren Sawatzky	
2026–	(United States) Brian Ownby	Interim manager

== Honors ==
=== League ===
- A-League (Second Tier)
  - Regular Season (1): 2001
- USL Second Division/USL Pro/USL League One (Third Tier)
  - Regular Season (4): 2006, 2007, 2013, 2022
  - Playoffs (2): 2006, 2009
- USISL Premier League (Fourth Tier)
  - Playoffs (1): 1995

=== Cup ===
- Lamar Hunt U.S. Open Cup
  - Winners (1): 1995

=== International ===
- Participations in CONCACAF Cup Winners Cup: 1996

=== Other ===
- Bon Secours Cup
  - Winners (2): 2019, 2020
- James River Cup
  - Winners (7): 1998, 1999, 2000, 2002, 2003, 2004, 2005

== Record ==
=== Year-by-year ===
This is a partial list of the last five seasons completed by the Kickers. For the full season-by-season history, see: List of Richmond Kickers seasons.

Season	League											Position		Playoffs	USOC	Continental	Average attendance	Top goalscorer(s)	
Season	Div	League	Pld	W	L	D	GF	GA	GD	Pts	PPG	Conf.	Div.	Playoffs	USOC	Continental	Average attendance	Top goalscorer(s)	
2022	3	USL L1	30	14	7	9	54	35	+19	51	1.70	N/A	1st	R1	R4	DNQ	3,551	(Argentina) Emiliano Terzaghi	17 ♦
2023	3	USL L1	32	6	15	11	42	55	–13	29	0.91	N/A	11th	DNQ	R3	DNQ	4,786	(Argentina) Emiliano Terzaghi	12
2024	3	USL L1	22	6	10	6	25	34	–9	24	1.09	N/A	8th	QF	R3	DNQ	4,515	(England) Chandler O'Dwyer	7
2025	3	USL L1	30	8	17	5	43	53	–10	29	1.43	N/A	13th	DNQ	R1	DNQ	4,369	(Honduras) Darwin Espinal	9
2026	3	USL L1	32	7	20	5	37	65	-28	26		N/A	17th	DNQ	R32	DNQ	4,079	(Germany) Tarik Pannholzer	8

1. Avg. attendance include statistics from league matches only.
2. Top goalscorer(s) includes all goals scored in league, league playoffs, U.S. Open Cup, CONCACAF Champions League, and other competitive continental matches.

=== History vs. Major League Soccer ===
- 3/15/97 – Exhibition – Richmond Kickers 3 vs. Columbus Crew 1 (UR Stadium)
- 6/17/97 – Exhibition – D.C. United 4 vs. Richmond Kickers 2 (UR Stadium)
- 7/23/97 – U.S. Open Cup (3rd Rd) – MetroStars 3 vs. Richmond Kickers 0 (UR Stadium)
- 6/14/00 – U.S. Open Cup (2nd Rd) – Richmond Kickers 3 vs. Colorado Rapids 0 (UR Stadium)
- 7/25/00 – U.S. Open Cup (3rd Rd) – San Jose Earthquakes 2 vs. Richmond Kickers 0 (Spartan Stadium)
- 4/1/01 – Exhibition – Richmond Kickers 0 vs. Dallas Burn 0 (UR Stadium)
- 7/24/01 – U.S. Open Cup (4th Rd) – D.C. United 2 vs. Richmond Kickers 1 (RFK Stadium)
- 4/13/02 – Exhibition – Richmond Kickers 0 vs. D.C. United 1 (UR Stadium)
- 7/17/02 – U.S. Open Cup (3rd Rd) – Columbus Crew 3 vs. Richmond Kickers 0 (Crew Stadium)
- 4/5/03 – Exhibition – Richmond Kickers 1 vs. D.C. United 1 (UR Stadium)
- 7/21/04 – U.S. Open Cup (4th Rd) – Richmond Kickers 2 vs. D.C. United 1 (UR Stadium)
- 8/4/04 – U.S. Open Cup (Quarterfinals) – Chicago Fire 1 vs. Richmond Kickers 0 (UR Stadium)
- 8/3/05 – U.S. Open Cup (4th Rd) – Richmond Kickers 1 vs. D.C. United 3 (UR Stadium)
- 7/10/07 – U.S. Open Cup (3rd Rd) – Richmond Kickers 1 vs Los Angeles Galaxy 0 (UR Stadium)
- 3/22/08 – Exhibition – Richmond Kickers 3 vs. D.C. United 0 (UR Stadium)
- 7/1/08 - U.S. Open Cup (3rd Rd) - New England Revolution 3 vs. Richmond Kickers 0 (Veteran's Stadium)
- 6/30/10 – U.S. Open Cup (4th Rd) – D.C. United 2 vs. Richmond Kickers 0 (George Mason Stadium)
- 6/28/11 – U.S. Open Cup (3rd Rd) – Richmond Kickers 2 vs. Columbus Crew 1 (Crew Stadium)
- 7/12/11 – U.S. Open Cup (Quarterfinals) – Richmond Kickers 2 vs. Sporting Kansas City 0 (Livestrong Sporting Park)
- 8/30/11 – U.S. Open Cup (Semifinals) – Chicago Fire 2 vs. Richmond Kickers 1 (Toyota Park)
- 5/29/12 – U.S. Open Cup (3rd Rd) – Richmond Kickers 1 vs. D.C. United 2 (City Stadium)
- 7/17/15 – U.S. Open Cup (4th Rd) – Richmond Kickers 1 vs. Columbus Crew SC 3 (City Stadium)
- 6/6/18 – U.S. Open Cup (4th Rd) – Philadelphia Union 5 vs. Richmond Kickers 0 (Talen Energy Stadium)
- 5/11/22 – U.S. Open Cup (4th Rd) – Richmond Kickers 1 vs. Charlotte FC 5 (City Stadium)
- 4/26/23 – U.S. Open Cup (3rd Rd) – D.C. United 1 vs. Richmond Kickers 0 (Audi Field)
- 4/17/26 – U.S. Open Cup (Rd of 32) – Richmond Kickers 0 vs. Columbus Crew 3 (City Stadium)

=== International competition ===
- 7/16/04 – Exhibition – Richmond Kickers 1 vs. Nottingham Forest 1 (UR Stadium)
- 7/25/09 – Exhibition – Richmond Kickers 1 vs. C.S.D. Comunicaciones 0 (UR Stadium)
- 7/1/14 – Exhibition – Richmond Kickers 1 vs. Mexico U21 1 (City Stadium)
- 7/31/14 – Exhibition – Richmond Kickers 0 vs. Crystal Palace 3 (City Stadium)
- 7/19/15 – Exhibition – Richmond Kickers 1 vs. West Bromwich Albion 2 (City Stadium)
- 7/16/16 – Exhibition – Richmond Kickers 2 vs. Swansea City A.F.C. 0 (City Stadium)
- 7/16/25 – Exhibition – Richmond Kickers 1 vs. C.D. Leganés 1 (City Stadium)
